= Mauro Francis =

Canadian politician (born 1995)

President of the Conservative Party of British Columbia
- Incumbent
- Assumed office August 20, 2026
- Vice President: Pavneet Singh
- Preceded by: Aisha Estey

Personal details
- Born: 1995 (age 30–31) Vancouver, British Columbia, Canada
- Party: BC Conservative
- Other political affiliations: Conservative (federal); Progress Vancouver (municipal)
- Spouse: Allie Blades (m. 2026)
- Children: 1
- Education: British Columbia Institute of Technology

Mauro A. Francis (born 1995) is a Canadian politician and community organizer who has served as president of the Conservative Party of British Columbia since 2026. He is also the executive director of the South Vancouver Community Policing Centre.

== Early life and education ==
Mauro Francis was born and raised in the Latin and Italian communities of East Vancouver, British Columbia. He has lived in East Vancouver his entire life; his family has resided in the area for more than 50 years.

He attended Templeton Secondary School in East Vancouver. He later graduated from the British Columbia Institute of Technology (BCIT). At one point he worked as an IT analyst at the University of British Columbia. As a young man, Francis became involved in community mentoring. He has served as a mentor with the East End Boys Club, working with at-risk youth in East Vancouver.

Francis is also executive director of the South Vancouver Community Policing Centre, a non-profit organization focused on community safety and crime prevention.

== Political career ==
=== Early campaigns ===
Francis first entered electoral politics in the 2021 Canadian federal election as the Conservative candidate in Vancouver East. He placed third with only 10% of the vote. He later ran in the 2022 Vancouver municipal election, running for city council with the Progress Vancouver slate but was unsuccessful.

In the 2025 federal election, Francis contested Burnaby North—Seymour for the Conservatives and finished second with 33.9%, behind incumbent Liberal MP Terry Beech.

=== President of the BC Conservatives ===
In August 2026 he was appointed President of the Conservative Party of British Columbia, succeeding Aisha Estey. He held the role through the party’s victory during the snap October 2026 provincial election, leading the Conservatives to government for the first time in over 98 years.

== Personal life ==
Francis lives in Vancouver with his wife, Allie Blades, who is the deputy chief of staff to Premier Lorne Doerkson.

== Electoral history ==
=== Federal ===
2025 Canadian federal election: Burnaby North—Seymour
Party	Candidate	Votes	%	±%	Expenditures
Liberal	Terry Beech	37,829	59.05	+18.17	$115,588.32
Conservative	Mauro Francis	21,742	33.94	+7.38	$117,480.54
New Democratic	Michael Charrois	4,121	6.43	–20.09	$20,195.77
People's	Jesse Fulton	366	0.57	–2.08	$370.22
Total valid votes/expense limit		64,058	99.37	–	$134,921.87
Total rejected ballots		407	0.63	+0.08	
Turnout		64,465	71.68	+9.74	
Eligible voters		89,939			
Liberal notional hold		Swing		+12.78	
Source: Elections Canada

2021 Canadian federal election: Vancouver East
Party	Candidate	Votes	%	±%	Expenditures
New Democratic	Jenny Kwan	27,969	56.40	+3.83	$67,138.66
Liberal	Josh Vander Vies	9,797	19.76	+1.62	$42,946.92
Conservative	Mauro Francis	5,399	10.89	–1.20	$9,491.11
Green	Cheryl Matthew	3,826	7.72	–6.78	$5,835.22
People's	Karin Litzcke	1,382	2.79	+1.57	$3,823.14
Libertarian	Gölök Buday	831	1.68	+0.67	none listed
Communist	Natasha Hale	387	0.78	+0.46	none listed
Total valid votes/expense limit		49,591	98.95	–	$119,373.85
Total rejected ballots		528	1.05	+0.10	
Turnout		50,119	54.85	–5.43	
Eligible voters		91,371			
New Democratic hold		Swing		+1.10	
Source: Elections Canada

=== Municipal ===
2022 Vancouver municipal election: Vancouver City Council
Party	Candidate	Votes	%	Elected
ABC Vancouver	Sarah Kirby-Yung (X)	72,545	42.30	✓
ABC Vancouver	Lisa Dominato (X)	70,415	41.05	✓
ABC Vancouver	Brian Montague	68,618	40.01	✓
ABC Vancouver	Mike Klassen	65,586	38.24	✓
ABC Vancouver	Peter Meiszner	63,275	36.90	✓
ABC Vancouver	Rebecca Bligh (X)	62,765	36.60	✓
ABC Vancouver	Lenny Zhou	62,393	36.39	✓
Green	Adriane Carr (X)	41,831	24.39	✓
OneCity	Christine Boyle (X)	38,465	22.43	✓
Green	Pete Fry (X)	37,270	21.73	✓
Forward Together	Dulcy Anderson	33,985	19.82	
OneCity	Iona Bonamis	33,745	19.68	
Forward Together	Tesicca Truong	32,900	19.18	
COPE	Jean Swanson (X)	32,833	19.15	
Green	Michael Wiebe (X)	30,377	17.71	
OneCity	Ian Cromwell	29,833	17.40	
OneCity	Matthew Norris	29,663	17.30	
Forward Together	Alvin Singh	29,049	16.94	
NPA	Melissa De Genova (X)	26,578	15.50	
COPE	Breen Ouellette	24,881	14.51	
Forward Together	Jeanette Ashe	22,432	13.08	
Forward Together	Russil Wvong	22,107	12.89	
Green	Devyani Singh	21,255	12.39	
TEAM	Cleta Brown	20,854	12.16	
Green	Stephanie Smith	20,408	11.90	
Forward Together	Hilary Brown	19,902	11.61	
COPE	Nancy Trigueros	19,152	11.17	
TEAM	Sean Nardi	18,353	10.70	
TEAM	Grace Quan	17,955	10.47	
COPE	Tanya Webking	17,675	10.31	
TEAM	Bill Tieleman	17,240	10.05	
TEAM	Stephen Roberts	16,261	9.48	
Vision	Stuart Mackinnon	15,865	9.25	
NPA	Morning Lee	14,083	8.21	
TEAM	Param Nijjar	13,950	8.13	
VOTE Socialist	Sean Orr	13,744	8.01	
Progress Vancouver	Asha Hayer	13,107	7.64	
NPA	Ken Charko	12,083	7.47	
Vision	Lesli Boldt	11,070	6.46	
NPA	Elaine Allan	10,917	6.37	
Affordable Housing Coalition	Eric Redmond	10,617	6.19	
NPA	Arezo Zarrabian	10,361	6.04	
Progress Vancouver	Marie Noelle Rosa	10,111	5.90	
Progress Vancouver	Morgane Oger	10,015	5.84	
Progress Vancouver	David Chin	9,354	5.45	
Progress Vancouver	May He	8,593	5.01	
NPA	Cinnamon Bhayani	8,586	5.01	
Independent	Lina Vargas	7,714	4.50	
Vision	Honieh Barzegari	6,831	3.98	
Progress Vancouver	Mauro Francis	6,556	3.82	
Independent	Mark Bowen	5,706	3.33	
Independent	Dominic Denofrio	4,927	2.87	
Independent	Amy "Evil Genius" Fox	3,711	2.16	
Independent	Jeremy MacKenzie	3,446	2.01	
Independent	Kyra Philbert	3,382	1.97	
Independent	Tim Lý	3,339	1.95	
Independent	Marlo Franson	2,866	1.67	
Independent	Amie Peacock	2,745	1.60	
Independent	K. R. Alm	2,301	1.34	
"(X)" indicates incumbent city councillor. Percentage of votes shown is percentage of voters who voted, not votes cast.
Source: City of Vancouver

== See also ==
- List of Italian Canadians
- 2022 Vancouver municipal election
- 2026 British Columbia general election
- Christina Mitas
