= Devyani Singh =

Canadian politician and climate scientist

Vancouver City Councillor
- Incumbent
- Assumed office November 2, 2026

Personal details
- Party: COPE
- Other political affiliations: British Columbia Green Party, Green Party of Canada, Vancouver Green Party
- Profession: Financial analyst, climate researcher
- Website: https://www.devyanisingh.com

Devyani Singh is a Canadian politician and climate scientist. She was elected to Vancouver City Council with the Coalition of Progressive Electors in the 2026 Vancouver municipal election.

== Biography ==
Singh was raised in Uttarakhand in the Indian Himalayan Region. She credited her upbringing in this mountainous area for her interest in the environment and climate change. She identifies as queer.

=== Academia ===
Singh left India for Iowa City in 2005 and obtained an MBA in finance from the University of Iowa in 2007. She worked as a financial analyst for various American companies until she relocated to Columbus, Ohio, in 2010 to continue her studies. She obtained a Master of Science in environmental science from Ohio State University in 2012.

She moved to Vancouver to do a PhD in the Faculty of Forestry at the University of British Columbia, co-supervised by Gary Bull and Hisham Zerriffi. She completed her PhD in 2019, defending a dissertation on wood burning and clean cooking fuels in rural India. She was subsequently a postdoctoral fellow at the Harrisburg University of Science and Technology, at the University of British Columbia and at Royal Roads University.

=== Political career ===
After completing her PhD, Singh said that she felt compelled to enter politics to not "take a back seat" with regards to issues of energy use and climate change. She became critical of what she termed "false promises" on fossil fuels from the British Columbia New Democratic Party and Premier David Eby. She was the candidate for the British Columbia Green Party in the Vancouver-Point Grey district in the the 2020 and 2024 British Columbia general elections, placing third behind Eby and the BC Conservative Party candidates in both elections. She also ran for the Green Party of Canada in Vancouver Quadra during the 2021 Canadian federal election, placing fourth.

Singh ran for Vancouver City Council with the Green Party of Vancouver in the 2022 election, placing 23rd. In May 2026, she was nominated as one of the Coalition of Progressive Electors' Council candidates in the 2026 Vancouver municipal election, alongside Sean Orr, Solomon Yi-Kieran, and Chloe Leslie. All four were elected to Vancouver City Council, with Singh placing fourth out of ten successful candidates. In doing so, she became the second Indian-born person elected to Vancouver City Council after Setty Pendakur in 1972.

== Electoral record ==
=== Federal elections ===
2021 Canadian federal election: Vancouver Quadra
Party	Candidate	Votes	%	±%	Expenditures
Liberal	Joyce Murray	20,814	43.63	+0.10	$93,921.31
Conservative	Brad Armstrong	13,786	28.90	+1.15	$103,409.23
New Democratic	Naden Abenes	9,220	19.33	+4.19	$9,885.59
Green	Devyani Singh	2,922	6.13	–6.30	$18,663.20
People's	Renate Siekmann	963	2.02	+1.18	$20,173.89
Total valid votes/expense limit		47,705	99.39	–	$108,762.68
Total rejected ballots		291	0.61	+0.11	
Turnout		47,996	62.65	–4.49	
Eligible voters		76,613			
Liberal hold		Swing		–0.53	
Source: Elections Canada

=== Provincial elections ===
2024 British Columbia general election: Vancouver-Point Grey
Party	Candidate	Votes	%	±%	Expenditures
New Democratic	David Eby	12,538	56.77	+7.2	$47,403.30
Conservative	Paul Ratchford	7,622	34.51	–	$61,135.35
Green	Devyani Singh	1,925	8.72	–8.9	$5,135.78
Total valid votes / expenses limit		22,085	100.00	–	$71,700.08
Total rejected ballots		40	0.18	–	
Turnout		22,125	63.43	–	
Registered voters		34,880			
New Democratic notional hold		Swing		–	
Note: Change in percentage based on 2020 redistributed results.
Source: Elections BC

2020 British Columbia general election: Vancouver-Point Grey
Party	Candidate	Votes	%	±%	Expenditures
New Democratic	David Eby	12,602	51.32	−4.62	$33,547.40
Liberal	Mark Bowen	7,712	31.41	−1.75	$36,024.26
Green	Devyani Singh	4,241	17.27	+7.01	$0.00
Total valid votes		24,555	100.00	–	
Total rejected ballots		96	0.39	−0.01	
Turnout		24,651	59.95	−3.68	
Registered voters		41,122			
New Democratic hold		Swing		−1.44	
Source: Elections BC

=== Municipal elections ===
2026 Vancouver municipal election: Vancouver City Council
Party	Candidate	Votes	%	Elected
COPE	Sean Orr (X)	83,038	5.02	✓
Green	Annette Reilly	78,476	4.75	✓
COPE	Chloe Leslie	67,791	4.10	✓
COPE	Devyani Singh	65,473	3.96	✓
Green	Stephanie Smith	64,070	3.88	✓
OneCity	Lucy Maloney (X)	63,143	3.82	✓
Green	Camil Dumont	62,540	3.78	✓
COPE	Solomon Yi-Kieran	60,361	3.65	✓
ABC Vancouver	Mike Klassen (X)	57,798	3.50	✓
Green	Bridget Burns	57,788	3.50	✓
ABC Vancouver	Joyce Gillespie	54,981	3.33	
ABC Vancouver	Peter Meiszner (X)	54,507	3.30	
ABC Vancouver	Sarah Kirby-Yung (X)	54,453	3.29	
ABC Vancouver	Lisa Dominato (X)	54,446	3.29	
OneCity	Iona Bonamis	54,366	3.29	
OneCity	Frances Bula	51,498	3.12	
ABC Vancouver	Lenny Zhou (X)	49,874	3.02	
OneCity	Jarrett Hagglund	48,798	2.95	
OneCity	Caitlin Stockwell	48,715	2.95	
ABC Vancouver	Lorraine Lowe	48,095	2.91	
ABC Vancouver	David Grewal	48,086	2.91	
ABC Vancouver	Arezo Zarrabian	44,008	2.66	
Liberal	Victoria Jung	23,791	1.44	
TEAM	Kathleen Larsen	23,141	1.40	
TEAM	Amanda Boggan	22,303	1.35	
TEAM	Charles Kelly	21,895	1.32	
TEAM	Josh Gordon	21,294	1.29	
Liberal	Moira Stilwell	20,844	1.26	
TEAM	Jonathan Weisman	19,746	1.19	
Liberal	Jessica Walton	18,970	1.15	
Liberal	John Coupar	17,362	1.05	
Vote Vancouver	Rebecca Hasdell	17,043	1.03	
TEAM	Raj Mundra	16,177	0.98	
Liberal	Michael Wu	15,748	0.95	
TEAM	Patrick Sauriol	15,356	0.93	
Liberal	Devin Clemens	14,373	0.87	
Liberal	Armor Valor	14,270	0.86	
Vote Vancouver	Geoff Teoli	11,086	0.67	
Vote Vancouver	John Boychuk	9,945	0.60	
Affordable Housing	Eric Redmond	9,543	0.58	
Vote Vancouver	Keerit Jutla	8,974	0.54	
Vote Vancouver	Steve Jedreicich	8,438	0.51	
Vote Vancouver	Bhavna Solecki	7,201	0.44	
Bright Future	Andy Lin	6,122	0.37	
Independent	John Jones	5,088	0.31	
Independent	Rollergirl	4,910	0.30	
Independent	Job Zhao	3,731	0.23	
Bright Future	Yadwinder Mangat	3,613	0.22	
Bright Future	Judith Kasiama	3,568	0.22	
TrueBlue	Naomi Chocyk	3,566	0.22	
Bright Future	Bilal Khan	2,989	0.18	
Independent	Guy Dubé	2,231	0.13	
Independent	Parris J. Williams	2,229	0.13	
Bright Future	Mohadeseh Gharib P. Arasi	2,185	0.13	
Bright Future	Ibrahima Cisse	2,122	0.13	
Independent	Noi Soudarack	838	0.05	

2022 Vancouver municipal election: Vancouver City Council
Party	Candidate	Votes	%	Elected
ABC Vancouver	Sarah Kirby-Yung (X)	72,545	42.30	✓
ABC Vancouver	Lisa Dominato (X)	70,415	41.05	✓
ABC Vancouver	Brian Montague	68,618	40.01	✓
ABC Vancouver	Mike Klassen	65,586	38.24	✓
ABC Vancouver	Peter Meiszner	63,275	36.90	✓
ABC Vancouver	Rebecca Bligh (X)	62,765	36.60	✓
ABC Vancouver	Lenny Zhou	62,393	36.39	✓
Green	Adriane Carr (X)	41,831	24.39	✓
OneCity	Christine Boyle (X)	38,465	22.43	✓
Green	Pete Fry (X)	37,270	21.73	✓
Forward Together	Dulcy Anderson	33,985	19.82	
OneCity	Iona Bonamis	33,745	19.68	
Forward Together	Tesicca Truong	32,900	19.18	
COPE	Jean Swanson (X)	32,833	19.15	
Green	Michael Wiebe (X)	30,377	17.71	
OneCity	Ian Cromwell	29,833	17.40	
OneCity	Matthew Norris	29,663	17.30	
Forward Together	Alvin Singh	29,049	16.94	
NPA	Melissa De Genova (X)	26,578	15.50	
COPE	Breen Ouellette	24,881	14.51	
Forward Together	Jeanette Ashe	22,432	13.08	
Forward Together	Russil Wvong	22,107	12.89	
Green	Devyani Singh	21,255	12.39	
TEAM	Cleta Brown	20,854	12.16	
Green	Stephanie Smith	20,408	11.90	
Forward Together	Hilary Brown	19,902	11.61	
COPE	Nancy Trigueros	19,152	11.17	
TEAM	Sean Nardi	18,353	10.70	
TEAM	Grace Quan	17,955	10.47	
COPE	Tanya Webking	17,675	10.31	
TEAM	Bill Tieleman	17,240	10.05	
TEAM	Stephen Roberts	16,261	9.48	
Vision	Stuart Mackinnon	15,865	9.25	
NPA	Morning Lee	14,083	8.21	
TEAM	Param Nijjar	13,950	8.13	
VOTE Socialist	Sean Orr	13,744	8.01	
Progress Vancouver	Asha Hayer	13,107	7.64	
NPA	Ken Charko	12,083	7.47	
Vision	Lesli Boldt	11,070	6.46	
NPA	Elaine Allan	10,917	6.37	
Affordable Housing Coalition	Eric Redmond	10,617	6.19	
NPA	Arezo Zarrabian	10,361	6.04	
Progress Vancouver	Marie Noelle Rosa	10,111	5.90	
Progress Vancouver	Morgane Oger	10,015	5.84	
Progress Vancouver	David Chin	9,354	5.45	
Progress Vancouver	May He	8,593	5.01	
NPA	Cinnamon Bhayani	8,586	5.01	
Independent	Lina Vargas	7,714	4.50	
Vision	Honieh Barzegari	6,831	3.98	
Progress Vancouver	Mauro Francis	6,556	3.82	
Independent	Mark Bowen	5,706	3.33	
Independent	Dominic Denofrio	4,927	2.87	
Independent	Amy "Evil Genius" Fox	3,711	2.16	
Independent	Jeremy MacKenzie	3,446	2.01	
Independent	Kyra Philbert	3,382	1.97	
Independent	Tim Lý	3,339	1.95	
Independent	Marlo Franson	2,866	1.67	
Independent	Amie Peacock	2,745	1.60	
Independent	K. R. Alm	2,301	1.34	
"(X)" indicates incumbent city councillor. Percentage of votes shown is percentage of voters who voted, not votes cast.
Source: City of Vancouver
