= Sean Orr =

Canadian politician and writer

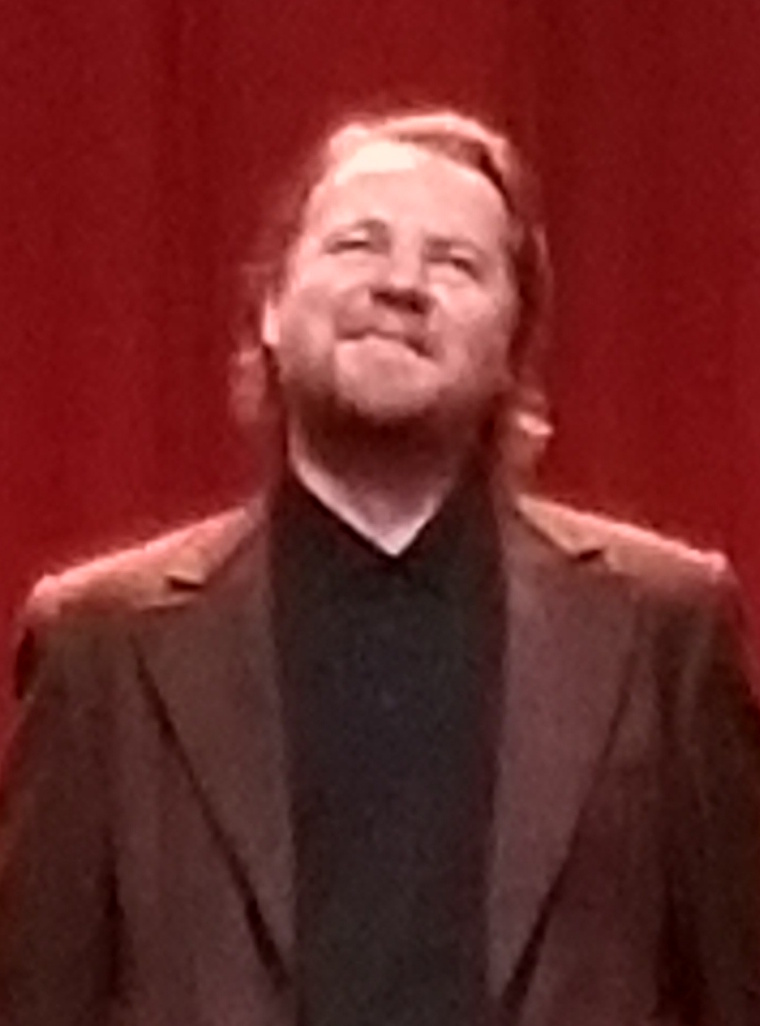
- Orr in 2026

Vancouver City Councillor
- Incumbent
- Assumed office April 15, 2025

Personal details
- Born: May 18, 1978 (age 48) Surrey, British Columbia, Canada
- Party: COPE
- Other political affiliations: VOTE Socialist (2022); BC Greens (2005)
- Education: Simon Fraser University (BA)
- Occupation: Politician; writer

Sean Orr (born May 18, 1978) is a Canadian politician and writer in Vancouver, British Columbia. In 2025, he was elected to represent the left-wing Coalition of Progressive Electors (COPE) on Vancouver City Council during the by-election. Orr was re-elected in the 2026 Vancouver municipal election with COPE. In both elections, he received the highest number of votes amongst elected council candidates.

Orr has been chosen as Vancouver's first deputy mayor during this current council term by mayor Pete Fry.

== Biography ==
Orr was born in Surrey to Northern Irish immigrant parents and raised in the Metro Vancouver area. He credits his family for his involvement in politics from a young age.

He studied geography at the University of British Columbia before dropping out in his third year and soon began writing letters to the editor and blogging. This led to Orr writing for Toronto-based Beyond Robson's Morning Brew column in the mid-2000s, through which he gained popularity.

Sean has undertaken many art projects. In 2009, he self-published a photography book called "Pretty Drifted," encapsulating snapshots of urban Vancouver. Sean has been a musician in multiple bands such as Taxes, Kidnapping, producing music via the project Tassels, and most recently as front man for the hardcore-punk band NEEDS, since 2012.

Since 2011, Sean has been a writer for Vancouver-based Scout Magazine. His column Tea and Two Slices showcases Orr's outspoken leftist political commentary and has provided a digital outlet for his advocacy and activism.

Orr graduated from Simon Fraser University with a Bachelor of Arts in geography and political science in 2025.

== Vancouver City Council ==
Orr first ran as a candidate for Vancouver City Council in the newly formed municipal party VOTE Socialist during the 2022 Vancouver municipal election. Orr received 13,744 votes in the election. Orr previously ran as a Green Party of British Columbia candidate in Surrey-Tynehead in the 2005 British Columbia general election.

Ahead of the 2025 Vancouver City Council by-election, the VOTE Socialist party officially deregistered as an electoral party in support of Sean Orr's candidacy with COPE. His campaign focused on homelessness, rent control, the Downtown Eastside, and climate change.

During the 2025 Vancouver City Council by-election, Orr garnered 50.7 percent of the vote, becoming one of two councillors elected.

In 2026, Orr endorsed Avi Lewis in that year's federal NDP leadership race.

Orr was re-elected in the 2026 Vancouver municipal election with COPE with 83,038 votes and 5.02% of the total votes cast, making him the council candidate who received the most votes. The record for the highest amount of votes received by a city council candidate in a Vancouver municipal election was set by Orr during this election. The outcome of the 2026 election has resulted in Sean Orr being part of a full 12 member slate of COPE candidates (4 city councillors, 4 park board commissioners, 4 school trustees total) who were elected as part of landslide victory for the COPE party.

== Electoral record ==
=== Municipal elections ===
2026 Vancouver municipal election: Vancouver City Council
Party	Candidate	Votes	%	Elected
COPE	Sean Orr (X)	83,038	5.02	✓
Green	Annette Reilly	78,476	4.75	✓
COPE	Chloe Leslie	67,791	4.10	✓
COPE	Devyani Singh	65,473	3.96	✓
Green	Stephanie Smith	64,070	3.88	✓
OneCity	Lucy Maloney (X)	63,143	3.82	✓
Green	Camil Dumont	62,540	3.78	✓
COPE	Solomon Yi-Kieran	60,361	3.65	✓
ABC Vancouver	Mike Klassen (X)	57,798	3.50	✓
Green	Bridget Burns	57,788	3.50	✓
ABC Vancouver	Joyce Gillespie	54,981	3.33	
ABC Vancouver	Peter Meiszner (X)	54,507	3.30	
ABC Vancouver	Sarah Kirby-Yung (X)	54,453	3.29	
ABC Vancouver	Lisa Dominato (X)	54,446	3.29	
OneCity	Iona Bonamis	54,366	3.29	
OneCity	Frances Bula	51,498	3.12	
ABC Vancouver	Lenny Zhou (X)	49,874	3.02	
OneCity	Jarrett Hagglund	48,798	2.95	
OneCity	Caitlin Stockwell	48,715	2.95	
ABC Vancouver	Lorraine Lowe	48,095	2.91	
ABC Vancouver	David Grewal	48,086	2.91	
ABC Vancouver	Arezo Zarrabian	44,008	2.66	
Liberal	Victoria Jung	23,791	1.44	
TEAM	Kathleen Larsen	23,141	1.40	
TEAM	Amanda Boggan	22,303	1.35	
TEAM	Charles Kelly	21,895	1.32	
TEAM	Josh Gordon	21,294	1.29	
Liberal	Moira Stilwell	20,844	1.26	
TEAM	Jonathan Weisman	19,746	1.19	
Liberal	Jessica Walton	18,970	1.15	
Liberal	John Coupar	17,362	1.05	
Vote Vancouver	Rebecca Hasdell	17,043	1.03	
TEAM	Raj Mundra	16,177	0.98	
Liberal	Michael Wu	15,748	0.95	
TEAM	Patrick Sauriol	15,356	0.93	
Liberal	Devin Clemens	14,373	0.87	
Liberal	Armor Valor	14,270	0.86	
Vote Vancouver	Geoff Teoli	11,086	0.67	
Vote Vancouver	John Boychuk	9,945	0.60	
Affordable Housing	Eric Redmond	9,543	0.58	
Vote Vancouver	Keerit Jutla	8,974	0.54	
Vote Vancouver	Steve Jedreicich	8,438	0.51	
Vote Vancouver	Bhavna Solecki	7,201	0.44	
Bright Future	Andy Lin	6,122	0.37	
Independent	John Jones	5,088	0.31	
Independent	Rollergirl	4,910	0.30	
Independent	Job Zhao	3,731	0.23	
Bright Future	Yadwinder Mangat	3,613	0.22	
Bright Future	Judith Kasiama	3,568	0.22	
TrueBlue	Naomi Chocyk	3,566	0.22	
Bright Future	Bilal Khan	2,989	0.18	
Independent	Guy Dubé	2,231	0.13	
Independent	Parris J. Williams	2,229	0.13	
Bright Future	Mohadeseh Gharib P. Arasi	2,185	0.13	
Bright Future	Ibrahima Cisse	2,122	0.13	
Independent	Noi Soudarack	838	0.05	

Vancouver municipal by-election, April 5, 2025: Vancouver City Council Resignation of Christine Boyle and Adriane Carr
Party	Candidate	Votes	%	Elected
COPE	Sean Orr	34,448	50.69	✓
OneCity	Lucy Maloney	33,732	49.63	✓
TEAM	Colleen Hardwick	17,352	25.53	
Green	Annette Reilly	15,045	22.14	
TEAM	Theodore Abbott	11,581	17.04	
ABC Vancouver	Jaime Stein	9,267	13.64	
ABC Vancouver	Ralph Kaisers	8,915	13.12	
Independent	Jeanifer Decena	652	0.96	
Independent	Guy Dubé	459	0.68	
Independent	Karin Litzcke	433	0.64	
Independent	Rollergirl	404	0.59	
Independent	Charles Ling	352	0.52	
Independent	Gerry McGuire	276	0.41	
Total number of voters		67,962	100.00	
Rejected ballots		0	0.00	
Turnout		67,962	15.09	
Eligible voters		450,503	–	
Percentage of votes shown is percentage of voters who voted, not votes cast.
Source: City of Vancouver

2022 Vancouver municipal election: Vancouver City Council
Party	Candidate	Votes	%	Elected
ABC Vancouver	Sarah Kirby-Yung (X)	72,545	42.30	✓
ABC Vancouver	Lisa Dominato (X)	70,415	41.05	✓
ABC Vancouver	Brian Montague	68,618	40.01	✓
ABC Vancouver	Mike Klassen	65,586	38.24	✓
ABC Vancouver	Peter Meiszner	63,275	36.90	✓
ABC Vancouver	Rebecca Bligh (X)	62,765	36.60	✓
ABC Vancouver	Lenny Zhou	62,393	36.39	✓
Green	Adriane Carr (X)	41,831	24.39	✓
OneCity	Christine Boyle (X)	38,465	22.43	✓
Green	Pete Fry (X)	37,270	21.73	✓
Forward Together	Dulcy Anderson	33,985	19.82	
OneCity	Iona Bonamis	33,745	19.68	
Forward Together	Tesicca Truong	32,900	19.18	
COPE	Jean Swanson (X)	32,833	19.15	
Green	Michael Wiebe (X)	30,377	17.71	
OneCity	Ian Cromwell	29,833	17.40	
OneCity	Matthew Norris	29,663	17.30	
Forward Together	Alvin Singh	29,049	16.94	
NPA	Melissa De Genova (X)	26,578	15.50	
COPE	Breen Ouellette	24,881	14.51	
Forward Together	Jeanette Ashe	22,432	13.08	
Forward Together	Russil Wvong	22,107	12.89	
Green	Devyani Singh	21,255	12.39	
TEAM	Cleta Brown	20,854	12.16	
Green	Stephanie Smith	20,408	11.90	
Forward Together	Hilary Brown	19,902	11.61	
COPE	Nancy Trigueros	19,152	11.17	
TEAM	Sean Nardi	18,353	10.70	
TEAM	Grace Quan	17,955	10.47	
COPE	Tanya Webking	17,675	10.31	
TEAM	Bill Tieleman	17,240	10.05	
TEAM	Stephen Roberts	16,261	9.48	
Vision	Stuart Mackinnon	15,865	9.25	
NPA	Morning Lee	14,083	8.21	
TEAM	Param Nijjar	13,950	8.13	
VOTE Socialist	Sean Orr	13,744	8.01	
Progress Vancouver	Asha Hayer	13,107	7.64	
NPA	Ken Charko	12,083	7.47	
Vision	Lesli Boldt	11,070	6.46	
NPA	Elaine Allan	10,917	6.37	
Affordable Housing Coalition	Eric Redmond	10,617	6.19	
NPA	Arezo Zarrabian	10,361	6.04	
Progress Vancouver	Marie Noelle Rosa	10,111	5.90	
Progress Vancouver	Morgane Oger	10,015	5.84	
Progress Vancouver	David Chin	9,354	5.45	
Progress Vancouver	May He	8,593	5.01	
NPA	Cinnamon Bhayani	8,586	5.01	
Independent	Lina Vargas	7,714	4.50	
Vision	Honieh Barzegari	6,831	3.98	
Progress Vancouver	Mauro Francis	6,556	3.82	
Independent	Mark Bowen	5,706	3.33	
Independent	Dominic Denofrio	4,927	2.87	
Independent	Amy "Evil Genius" Fox	3,711	2.16	
Independent	Jeremy MacKenzie	3,446	2.01	
Independent	Kyra Philbert	3,382	1.97	
Independent	Tim Lý	3,339	1.95	
Independent	Marlo Franson	2,866	1.67	
Independent	Amie Peacock	2,745	1.60	
Independent	K. R. Alm	2,301	1.34	
"(X)" indicates incumbent city councillor. Percentage of votes shown is percentage of voters who voted, not votes cast.
Source: City of Vancouver

=== Provincial elections ===
2005 British Columbia general election: Surrey-Tynehead
Party	Candidate	Votes	%	±%
Liberal	Dave Hayer	12,052	51.37	-9.58
New Democratic	Barry Bell	9,469	40.36	+24.64
Green	Sean Orr	1,095	4.67%	-4.67
Marijuana	Donald Joseph Briere	243	1.04	-0.28
Independent	Summer Davis	380	1.62	–
Independent	Gary Alan Hoffman	223	0.95	–
Total valid votes		23,462	100.00%	–
Liberal hold		Swing		–17.11
