= Mike Klassen =

Canadian politician

Vancouver City Councillor
- Incumbent
- Assumed office November 7, 2022

Personal details
- Born: Michael Aaron Klassen; 1962 (age 63–64) Vancouver, British Columbia, Canada
- Party: ABC Vancouver (municipal, 2022–present)
- Other political affiliations: BC United (provincial); Non-Partisan Association (municipal, 2011)
- Education: University of British Columbia

Mike Klassen is a Canadian politician and communications strategist who has served on the Vancouver City Council since 2022. He is a member of ABC Vancouver.

== Early life and career ==
Klassen attended Killarney Secondary School in Vancouver and earned a Bachelor of Arts in political science from the University of British Columbia. He worked as a production assistant in Vancouver's film industry and as a digital producer at Electronic Arts.

Prior to his election, Klassen served as British Columbia provincial director for the Canadian Federation of Independent Business (CFIB) and vice president of public affairs at the BC Care Providers Association. As provincial director, Klassen led CFIB's response to several issues. Klassen criticized the provincial government for shifting the fee burden of recycling to businesses, critiqued municipalities' spending on wages and benefits for public sector employees, praised the City of Langford for eliminating annual business license fees, and highlighted the need for a comprehensive plan for the province's reversion from the Harmonized Sales Tax.

== Vancouver municipal politics ==
From 2008 to 2012, Klassen wrote for CityCaucus.com, which he founded with Daniel Fontaine, now also a city councillor in New Westminster.

Under Sam Sullivan's mayoralty, Klassen served as vice chair of the Vancouver City Planning Commission. Klassen previously ran for city council in 2011 with the conservative Non-Partisan Association (NPA). He placed 13th, receiving votes from 33% of voters.

In the 2022 municipal election, Klassen was elected to city council with the upstart ABC Vancouver, largely composed of former NPA members. After his election, he stated his main focus as councillor would be protecting seniors, especially after the 2021 heat dome. Klassen pledged action on a "no net new GHG" policy to aid Vancouver's climate change mitigation efforts.

Klassen, previously executive director of the BC Wine Appellation Task Group, introduced a motion in April 2023 to expand the sale of wines in Vancouver grocery stores. The motion was approved unanimously.

In May 2023, Klassen moved an amendment to a city staff report concerning the municipal vacancy tax, which had been raised from 3% to 5% by the previous council under mayor Kennedy Stewart. City staff recommended lowering the tax back to 3%, but $3.8 million had already been collected from property developers and was allocated for social housing. Klassen's amendment directed staff to return the funds to developers and was approved by the ABC council majority in an 8–3 vote.

Klassen led a city-wide "Vancouver Beautification Day" in June 2023 to remove graffiti and repair vandalism in partnership with business improvement associations.

He was the only ABC Vancouver politician elected to any position in the 2026 Vancouver municipal election.

== Electoral history ==
2026 Vancouver municipal election: Vancouver City Council
Party	Candidate	Votes	%	Elected
COPE	Sean Orr (X)	83,038	5.02	✓
Green	Annette Reilly	78,476	4.75	✓
COPE	Chloe Leslie	67,791	4.10	✓
COPE	Devyani Singh	65,473	3.96	✓
Green	Stephanie Smith	64,070	3.88	✓
OneCity	Lucy Maloney (X)	63,143	3.82	✓
Green	Camil Dumont	62,540	3.78	✓
COPE	Solomon Yi-Kieran	60,361	3.65	✓
ABC Vancouver	Mike Klassen (X)	57,798	3.50	✓
Green	Bridget Burns	57,788	3.50	✓
ABC Vancouver	Joyce Gillespie	54,981	3.33	
ABC Vancouver	Peter Meiszner (X)	54,507	3.30	
ABC Vancouver	Sarah Kirby-Yung (X)	54,453	3.29	
ABC Vancouver	Lisa Dominato (X)	54,446	3.29	
OneCity	Iona Bonamis	54,366	3.29	
OneCity	Frances Bula	51,498	3.12	
ABC Vancouver	Lenny Zhou (X)	49,874	3.02	
OneCity	Jarrett Hagglund	48,798	2.95	
OneCity	Caitlin Stockwell	48,715	2.95	
ABC Vancouver	Lorraine Lowe	48,095	2.91	
ABC Vancouver	David Grewal	48,086	2.91	
ABC Vancouver	Arezo Zarrabian	44,008	2.66	
Liberal	Victoria Jung	23,791	1.44	
TEAM	Kathleen Larsen	23,141	1.40	
TEAM	Amanda Boggan	22,303	1.35	
TEAM	Charles Kelly	21,895	1.32	
TEAM	Josh Gordon	21,294	1.29	
Liberal	Moira Stilwell	20,844	1.26	
TEAM	Jonathan Weisman	19,746	1.19	
Liberal	Jessica Walton	18,970	1.15	
Liberal	John Coupar	17,362	1.05	
Vote Vancouver	Rebecca Hasdell	17,043	1.03	
TEAM	Raj Mundra	16,177	0.98	
Liberal	Michael Wu	15,748	0.95	
TEAM	Patrick Sauriol	15,356	0.93	
Liberal	Devin Clemens	14,373	0.87	
Liberal	Armor Valor	14,270	0.86	
Vote Vancouver	Geoff Teoli	11,086	0.67	
Vote Vancouver	John Boychuk	9,945	0.60	
Affordable Housing	Eric Redmond	9,543	0.58	
Vote Vancouver	Keerit Jutla	8,974	0.54	
Vote Vancouver	Steve Jedreicich	8,438	0.51	
Vote Vancouver	Bhavna Solecki	7,201	0.44	
Bright Future	Andy Lin	6,122	0.37	
Independent	John Jones	5,088	0.31	
Independent	Rollergirl	4,910	0.30	
Independent	Job Zhao	3,731	0.23	
Bright Future	Yadwinder Mangat	3,613	0.22	
Bright Future	Judith Kasiama	3,568	0.22	
TrueBlue	Naomi Chocyk	3,566	0.22	
Bright Future	Bilal Khan	2,989	0.18	
Independent	Guy Dubé	2,231	0.13	
Independent	Parris J. Williams	2,229	0.13	
Bright Future	Mohadeseh Gharib P. Arasi	2,185	0.13	
Bright Future	Ibrahima Cisse	2,122	0.13	
Independent	Noi Soudarack	838	0.05	

2022 Vancouver municipal election: Vancouver City Council
Party	Candidate	Votes	%	Elected
ABC Vancouver	Sarah Kirby-Yung (X)	72,545	42.30	✓
ABC Vancouver	Lisa Dominato (X)	70,415	41.05	✓
ABC Vancouver	Brian Montague	68,618	40.01	✓
ABC Vancouver	Mike Klassen	65,586	38.24	✓
ABC Vancouver	Peter Meiszner	63,275	36.90	✓
ABC Vancouver	Rebecca Bligh (X)	62,765	36.60	✓
ABC Vancouver	Lenny Zhou	62,393	36.39	✓
Green	Adriane Carr (X)	41,831	24.39	✓
OneCity	Christine Boyle (X)	38,465	22.43	✓
Green	Pete Fry (X)	37,270	21.73	✓
Forward Together	Dulcy Anderson	33,985	19.82	
OneCity	Iona Bonamis	33,745	19.68	
Forward Together	Tesicca Truong	32,900	19.18	
COPE	Jean Swanson (X)	32,833	19.15	
Green	Michael Wiebe (X)	30,377	17.71	
OneCity	Ian Cromwell	29,833	17.40	
OneCity	Matthew Norris	29,663	17.30	
Forward Together	Alvin Singh	29,049	16.94	
NPA	Melissa De Genova (X)	26,578	15.50	
COPE	Breen Ouellette	24,881	14.51	
Forward Together	Jeanette Ashe	22,432	13.08	
Forward Together	Russil Wvong	22,107	12.89	
Green	Devyani Singh	21,255	12.39	
TEAM	Cleta Brown	20,854	12.16	
Green	Stephanie Smith	20,408	11.90	
Forward Together	Hilary Brown	19,902	11.61	
COPE	Nancy Trigueros	19,152	11.17	
TEAM	Sean Nardi	18,353	10.70	
TEAM	Grace Quan	17,955	10.47	
COPE	Tanya Webking	17,675	10.31	
TEAM	Bill Tieleman	17,240	10.05	
TEAM	Stephen Roberts	16,261	9.48	
Vision	Stuart Mackinnon	15,865	9.25	
NPA	Morning Lee	14,083	8.21	
TEAM	Param Nijjar	13,950	8.13	
VOTE Socialist	Sean Orr	13,744	8.01	
Progress Vancouver	Asha Hayer	13,107	7.64	
NPA	Ken Charko	12,083	7.47	
Vision	Lesli Boldt	11,070	6.46	
NPA	Elaine Allan	10,917	6.37	
Affordable Housing Coalition	Eric Redmond	10,617	6.19	
NPA	Arezo Zarrabian	10,361	6.04	
Progress Vancouver	Marie Noelle Rosa	10,111	5.90	
Progress Vancouver	Morgane Oger	10,015	5.84	
Progress Vancouver	David Chin	9,354	5.45	
Progress Vancouver	May He	8,593	5.01	
NPA	Cinnamon Bhayani	8,586	5.01	
Independent	Lina Vargas	7,714	4.50	
Vision	Honieh Barzegari	6,831	3.98	
Progress Vancouver	Mauro Francis	6,556	3.82	
Independent	Mark Bowen	5,706	3.33	
Independent	Dominic Denofrio	4,927	2.87	
Independent	Amy "Evil Genius" Fox	3,711	2.16	
Independent	Jeremy MacKenzie	3,446	2.01	
Independent	Kyra Philbert	3,382	1.97	
Independent	Tim Lý	3,339	1.95	
Independent	Marlo Franson	2,866	1.67	
Independent	Amie Peacock	2,745	1.60	
Independent	K. R. Alm	2,301	1.34	
"(X)" indicates incumbent city councillor. Percentage of votes shown is percentage of voters who voted, not votes cast.
Source: City of Vancouver
