= Peter Meiszner =

Canadian politician

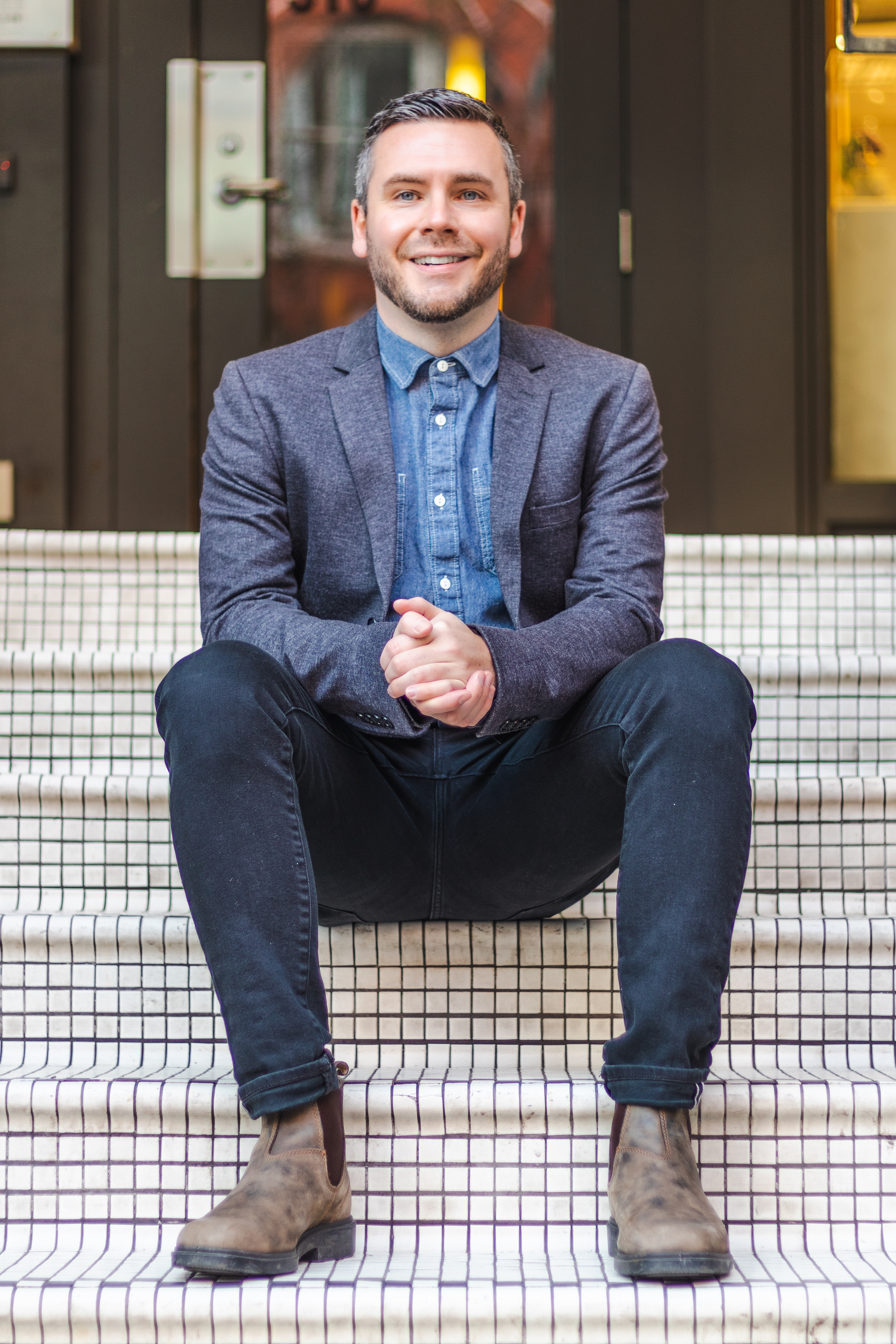

Vancouver City Councillor
- In office November 7, 2022 – November 2, 2026

Personal details
- Born: Peter David Meiszner; January 9, 1983 (age 43) Nanaimo, British Columbia, Canada
- Party: ABC Vancouver
- Education: Journalism and media relations
- Alma mater: University of British Columbia; British Columbia Institute of Technology
- Occupation: Politician, journalist
- Website: vancouver.ca/peter-meiszner

Peter Meiszner is a Canadian politician and journalist who served on the Vancouver City Council from 2022 until 2026. He is a member of ABC Vancouver.

== Early life and career ==
Originally from Nanaimo, British Columbia, Meiszner moved to Vancouver in 2002 after facing difficulty with his family when he came out as gay. He studied broadcast journalism at the British Columbia Institute of Technology, and worked as a television journalist for Global BC before leaving to join the University of British Columbia as a senior digital strategist and communications manager.

Prior to his election, Meiszner was also the publisher of urbanYVR, a website focused on housing and urban development issues in the Lower Mainland. During this time, he served as vice-chair of the Gastown Historic Area Planning Committee.

== Vancouver municipal politics ==
Meiszner was elected to Vancouver City Council in the 2022 municipal election. Upon assuming office, he was appointed as an alternate representative to the Metro Vancouver Regional District board and as a member of the Housing and Electoral Area ‘A’ committees. He has also served on the boards of the Vancouver Public Library, Vancouver Civic Theatres and EasyPark.

Meiszner expressed concerns over the presence of the Thomus Donaghy Overdose Prevention Site (OPS) in Yaletown, which replaced a mobile overdose prevention unit across the street at Emery Barnes Park. In April 2023, he called for the OPS to be shut down, but said he would not support closure without an assured new location. In June 2023, however, the City of Vancouver announced that the Yaletown OPS would close with no immediate relocation plans.

In 2023, Meiszner was involved in a joint effort between the ABC-led city council and park board to turn non-recirculating decorative water fountains on again, after they had previously been disabled due to concerns about water waste. On approval of the initiative, city staff were directed to turn the fountains off if Metro Vancouver moved to Stage 2 water restrictions.

In February 2024, Meiszner put forward a motion to install a permanent "Vancouver" sign in the city, intended to replace a temporary installation near Canada Place. He stated that the sign would align with the city's tourism goals, particularly during events such as the 2026 FIFA World Cup, the 2025 Invictus Games, and the 2024 Grey Cup. In May 2025, council voted 10–1 to install the permanent sign, committing up to $350,000 in funding for installation and maintenance, with Destination Vancouver and the Vancouver Hotel Destination Association each contributing $200,000.

== Electoral record ==
2026 Vancouver municipal election: Vancouver City Council
Party	Candidate	Votes	%	Elected
COPE	Sean Orr (X)	83,038	5.02	✓
Green	Annette Reilly	78,476	4.75	✓
COPE	Chloe Leslie	67,791	4.10	✓
COPE	Devyani Singh	65,473	3.96	✓
Green	Stephanie Smith	64,070	3.88	✓
OneCity	Lucy Maloney (X)	63,143	3.82	✓
Green	Camil Dumont	62,540	3.78	✓
COPE	Solomon Yi-Kieran	60,361	3.65	✓
ABC Vancouver	Mike Klassen (X)	57,798	3.50	✓
Green	Bridget Burns	57,788	3.50	✓
ABC Vancouver	Joyce Gillespie	54,981	3.33	
ABC Vancouver	Peter Meiszner (X)	54,507	3.30	
ABC Vancouver	Sarah Kirby-Yung (X)	54,453	3.29	
ABC Vancouver	Lisa Dominato (X)	54,446	3.29	
OneCity	Iona Bonamis	54,366	3.29	
OneCity	Frances Bula	51,498	3.12	
ABC Vancouver	Lenny Zhou (X)	49,874	3.02	
OneCity	Jarrett Hagglund	48,798	2.95	
OneCity	Caitlin Stockwell	48,715	2.95	
ABC Vancouver	Lorraine Lowe	48,095	2.91	
ABC Vancouver	David Grewal	48,086	2.91	
ABC Vancouver	Arezo Zarrabian	44,008	2.66	
Liberal	Victoria Jung	23,791	1.44	
TEAM	Kathleen Larsen	23,141	1.40	
TEAM	Amanda Boggan	22,303	1.35	
TEAM	Charles Kelly	21,895	1.32	
TEAM	Josh Gordon	21,294	1.29	
Liberal	Moira Stilwell	20,844	1.26	
TEAM	Jonathan Weisman	19,746	1.19	
Liberal	Jessica Walton	18,970	1.15	
Liberal	John Coupar	17,362	1.05	
Vote Vancouver	Rebecca Hasdell	17,043	1.03	
TEAM	Raj Mundra	16,177	0.98	
Liberal	Michael Wu	15,748	0.95	
TEAM	Patrick Sauriol	15,356	0.93	
Liberal	Devin Clemens	14,373	0.87	
Liberal	Armor Valor	14,270	0.86	
Vote Vancouver	Geoff Teoli	11,086	0.67	
Vote Vancouver	John Boychuk	9,945	0.60	
Affordable Housing	Eric Redmond	9,543	0.58	
Vote Vancouver	Keerit Jutla	8,974	0.54	
Vote Vancouver	Steve Jedreicich	8,438	0.51	
Vote Vancouver	Bhavna Solecki	7,201	0.44	
Bright Future	Andy Lin	6,122	0.37	
Independent	John Jones	5,088	0.31	
Independent	Rollergirl	4,910	0.30	
Independent	Job Zhao	3,731	0.23	
Bright Future	Yadwinder Mangat	3,613	0.22	
Bright Future	Judith Kasiama	3,568	0.22	
TrueBlue	Naomi Chocyk	3,566	0.22	
Bright Future	Bilal Khan	2,989	0.18	
Independent	Guy Dubé	2,231	0.13	
Independent	Parris J. Williams	2,229	0.13	
Bright Future	Mohadeseh Gharib P. Arasi	2,185	0.13	
Bright Future	Ibrahima Cisse	2,122	0.13	
Independent	Noi Soudarack	838	0.05	

2022 Vancouver municipal election: Vancouver City Council
Party	Candidate	Votes	%	Elected
ABC Vancouver	Sarah Kirby-Yung (X)	72,545	42.30	✓
ABC Vancouver	Lisa Dominato (X)	70,415	41.05	✓
ABC Vancouver	Brian Montague	68,618	40.01	✓
ABC Vancouver	Mike Klassen	65,586	38.24	✓
ABC Vancouver	Peter Meiszner	63,275	36.90	✓
ABC Vancouver	Rebecca Bligh (X)	62,765	36.60	✓
ABC Vancouver	Lenny Zhou	62,393	36.39	✓
Green	Adriane Carr (X)	41,831	24.39	✓
OneCity	Christine Boyle (X)	38,465	22.43	✓
Green	Pete Fry (X)	37,270	21.73	✓
Forward Together	Dulcy Anderson	33,985	19.82	
OneCity	Iona Bonamis	33,745	19.68	
Forward Together	Tesicca Truong	32,900	19.18	
COPE	Jean Swanson (X)	32,833	19.15	
Green	Michael Wiebe (X)	30,377	17.71	
OneCity	Ian Cromwell	29,833	17.40	
OneCity	Matthew Norris	29,663	17.30	
Forward Together	Alvin Singh	29,049	16.94	
NPA	Melissa De Genova (X)	26,578	15.50	
COPE	Breen Ouellette	24,881	14.51	
Forward Together	Jeanette Ashe	22,432	13.08	
Forward Together	Russil Wvong	22,107	12.89	
Green	Devyani Singh	21,255	12.39	
TEAM	Cleta Brown	20,854	12.16	
Green	Stephanie Smith	20,408	11.90	
Forward Together	Hilary Brown	19,902	11.61	
COPE	Nancy Trigueros	19,152	11.17	
TEAM	Sean Nardi	18,353	10.70	
TEAM	Grace Quan	17,955	10.47	
COPE	Tanya Webking	17,675	10.31	
TEAM	Bill Tieleman	17,240	10.05	
TEAM	Stephen Roberts	16,261	9.48	
Vision	Stuart Mackinnon	15,865	9.25	
NPA	Morning Lee	14,083	8.21	
TEAM	Param Nijjar	13,950	8.13	
VOTE Socialist	Sean Orr	13,744	8.01	
Progress Vancouver	Asha Hayer	13,107	7.64	
NPA	Ken Charko	12,083	7.47	
Vision	Lesli Boldt	11,070	6.46	
NPA	Elaine Allan	10,917	6.37	
Affordable Housing Coalition	Eric Redmond	10,617	6.19	
NPA	Arezo Zarrabian	10,361	6.04	
Progress Vancouver	Marie Noelle Rosa	10,111	5.90	
Progress Vancouver	Morgane Oger	10,015	5.84	
Progress Vancouver	David Chin	9,354	5.45	
Progress Vancouver	May He	8,593	5.01	
NPA	Cinnamon Bhayani	8,586	5.01	
Independent	Lina Vargas	7,714	4.50	
Vision	Honieh Barzegari	6,831	3.98	
Progress Vancouver	Mauro Francis	6,556	3.82	
Independent	Mark Bowen	5,706	3.33	
Independent	Dominic Denofrio	4,927	2.87	
Independent	Amy "Evil Genius" Fox	3,711	2.16	
Independent	Jeremy MacKenzie	3,446	2.01	
Independent	Kyra Philbert	3,382	1.97	
Independent	Tim Lý	3,339	1.95	
Independent	Marlo Franson	2,866	1.67	
Independent	Amie Peacock	2,745	1.60	
Independent	K. R. Alm	2,301	1.34	
"(X)" indicates incumbent city councillor. Percentage of votes shown is percentage of voters who voted, not votes cast.
Source: City of Vancouver
