= Moira Stilwell =

Canadian politician

Doctor Moira Stilwell
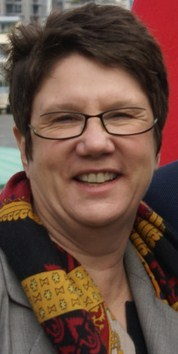

Member of the British Columbia Legislative Assembly for Vancouver-Langara
- In office May 12, 2009 – May 9, 2017
- Preceded by: Carole Taylor
- Succeeded by: Michael Lee

Minister of Advanced Education and Labour Market Development of British Columbia
- In office June 10, 2009 – October 25, 2010
- Premier: Gordon Campbell
- Preceded by: Murray Coell
- Succeeded by: Ida Chong (Science and Universities)

Minister of Regional Economic and Skills Development of British Columbia
- In office October 25, 2010 – November 22, 2010
- Premier: Gordon Campbell
- Preceded by: Position established
- Succeeded by: Ida Chong

Minister of Social Development of British Columbia
- In office September 5, 2012 – June 10, 2013
- Premier: Christy Clark
- Preceded by: Stephanie Cadieux
- Succeeded by: Don McRae (Social Development and Social Innovation)

Personal details
- Born: 1953 or 1954 (age 71–72)
- Party: Vancouver Liberal; BC Liberal
- Spouse: Sam Lichtenstein
- Profession: radiologist

Moira Stilwell (born 1953 or 1954) is a Canadian politician and physician who served as the member of the Legislative Assembly of British Columbia for the riding of Vancouver-Langara from 2009 to 2017. As part of the British Columbia Liberal Party caucus, she served in several cabinet posts under premiers Gordon Campbell and Christy Clark.

== Background ==
Stilwell graduated from the University of Calgary Medical School, and received further training in nuclear medicine at the University of British Columbia (UBC) and in radiology at the University of Toronto. After serving as staff radiologist and co-medical director of the Breast Health Program at BC Women's Hospital, she became the head of nuclear medicine at St. Paul's Hospital, Surrey Memorial Hospital, and Abbotsford Regional Hospital and Cancer Centre, but left all those positions in 2009 to run for public office. Along with serving as a practicing physician and administrator, she was the clinical assistant professor at UBC's Department of Radiology.

In addition to her professional capacities, Stilwell also served as the co-chair of the Canadian Breast Cancer Foundation 2020 Task Force, and was past chair of the Canadian Breast Cancer Foundation/BC Yukon Chapter. She has also served on the board of the Canadian Breast Cancer Research Alliance and on the BC Women's Hospital Foundation Board.

She is currently practising at the BC Children's Hospital and at St. Paul's Hospital where she is head of the division of nuclear medicine. She is active in resident teaching and encouraging physician engagement.

== Politics ==
She ran for the BC Liberals in the 2009 provincial election, and was elected member of the Legislative Assembly (MLA) for Vancouver-Langara by a margin of 4,275 votes. She was named to the cabinet by Premier Gordon Campbell that June as Minister of Advanced Education and Labour Market Development, before being re-assigned as Minister of Regional Economic and Skills Development in October 2010.

With Campbell resigning as premier and Liberal leader amidst the controversial implementation of the harmonized sales tax, Stilwell resigned her cabinet post in November 2010 to run for party leadership, becoming the first declared candidate in the race. During her campaign, Stilwell focused her attention on the importance of building a knowledge-based economy to ensure BC’s future prosperity; increasing the minimum wage in BC from $8/hour to $10/hour; and reducing the interest rate that students in BC pay for loans to finance their studies.

Stilwell dropped out of the campaign on February 16, 2011, announcing her support for George Abbott. The leadership election subsequently occurred on February 26, 2011, and was won by Christy Clark. Initially without a ministerial role in Clark's cabinet, Stilwell was instead appointed parliamentary secretary for industry, research and innovation to the Minister of Jobs, Tourism and Innovation on March 14, 2011, before becoming parliamentary secretary to the Minister of Health in March 2012. She returned to the cabinet in September 2012 as Minister of Social Development.

At the 2013 provincial election, she defeated New Democrat George Chow by 2,787 votes to win re-election as Vancouver-Langara MLA. She stayed on the backbenches for the duration of the 40th Parliament, and announced her decision to retire from politics on June 17, 2016, finishing her term as MLA in May 2017.

In 2026, she announced that she would run with the Vancouver Liberals for Vancouver City Council.

== Controversy ==
In 2012, Stilwell wrote a letter and report titled "Action Plan for Repatriating B.C. Medical Students Studying Abroad" to Mike de Jong, the Minister of Health Services, on the subject of British Columbians who wanted to return to Canada for their medical residency. In her report, she admits "The Ministry of Health Services and the UBC Faculty of Medicine maintain that BC medical students studying abroad must be treated the same as immigrant physicians applying to the BC IMG program because to do otherwise would be a violation of human rights and the Canadian Charter of Rights", but she argued that Canadians Studying Abroad (CSAs) should be treated the same as Canadian and American trained medical school graduates, i.e. preferentially treated over International Medical Graduates (IMGs). International Medical Graduates often have a very difficult time obtaining very limited residency positions in Canada.

As reported in Maclean's and The Tyee, she had an apparent and undisclosed personal stake in this issue, as her son, Kevin Lichtenstein, was studying medicine at an international university, and thus would benefit from an easier residency process.

On February 6, 2015, The Tyee reported that, "Cardiac surgeons on a selection committee at St. Paul's Hospital manipulated the hiring process for a training position so they could hire a student who was the son of their boss and of a provincial cabinet minister [Stilwell], documents show." During the selection process for residency, Dr. Cook at the University of British Columbia created an irregularity in the residency matching process where they left a spot open in during the first iteration of the matching process. Dr. Cook stated they had a candidate in mind who is a Canadian [who] studied medicine abroad and did an elective rotation with them. This candidate would not be eligible for first iteration but would be eligible for second iteration. Dr. Wong, also with UBC, stated that the process followed was not "fair or transparent or equitable for the other CaRMS [Canadian Residency Matching Service] candidates," and further that "the Program's actions were not compliant with the CaRMS rules and procedures and that this irregularity could be contested to CaRMS in the future by a candidate and/or a medical school."

Ultimately, the Cardiac Surgery residency slot was opened for a second iteration, a CaRMS irregularity. In that second iteration, over 96 applicants applied, and her son was selected as the successful candidate. As he was an international medical graduate, he was not eligible to apply to the first iteration of the Cardiac Surgery program at UBC. However, because of the irregularity that occurred (which notably was not compliant with the CaRMS rules), he was able to apply and gain entrance into the program.

== Electoral record ==
=== Provincial elections ===
2013 British Columbia general election: Vancouver-Langara
Party	Candidate	Votes	%
Liberal	Moira Stilwell	10,234	52.60
New Democratic	George Chow	7,447	38.28
Green	Regan-Heng Zhang	1,055	5.42
Conservative	Gurjinder Bains	674	3.46
Platinum	Espavo Sozo	45	0.23
Total valid votes		19,455	100.00
Total rejected ballots		172	0.88
Turnout		19,627	50.52
Source: Elections BC

2009 British Columbia general election: Vancouver-Langara
Party	Candidate	Votes	%	Expenditures
Liberal	Moira Stilwell	10,615	58.87	$89,931
New Democratic	Helesia Luke	6,340	35.16	$19,002
Green	J-M Toriel	1,075	5.97	$948
Total valid votes		18,030	100	
Total rejected ballots		167	0.92	
Turnout		18,197	47.71	
Source: Elections BC

=== Municipal elections ===
2026 Vancouver municipal election: Vancouver City Council
Party	Candidate	Votes	%	Elected
COPE	Sean Orr (X)	83,038	5.02	✓
Green	Annette Reilly	78,476	4.75	✓
COPE	Chloe Leslie	67,791	4.10	✓
COPE	Devyani Singh	65,473	3.96	✓
Green	Stephanie Smith	64,070	3.88	✓
OneCity	Lucy Maloney (X)	63,143	3.82	✓
Green	Camil Dumont	62,540	3.78	✓
COPE	Solomon Yi-Kieran	60,361	3.65	✓
ABC Vancouver	Mike Klassen (X)	57,798	3.50	✓
Green	Bridget Burns	57,788	3.50	✓
ABC Vancouver	Joyce Gillespie	54,981	3.33	
ABC Vancouver	Peter Meiszner (X)	54,507	3.30	
ABC Vancouver	Sarah Kirby-Yung (X)	54,453	3.29	
ABC Vancouver	Lisa Dominato (X)	54,446	3.29	
OneCity	Iona Bonamis	54,366	3.29	
OneCity	Frances Bula	51,498	3.12	
ABC Vancouver	Lenny Zhou (X)	49,874	3.02	
OneCity	Jarrett Hagglund	48,798	2.95	
OneCity	Caitlin Stockwell	48,715	2.95	
ABC Vancouver	Lorraine Lowe	48,095	2.91	
ABC Vancouver	David Grewal	48,086	2.91	
ABC Vancouver	Arezo Zarrabian	44,008	2.66	
Liberal	Victoria Jung	23,791	1.44	
TEAM	Kathleen Larsen	23,141	1.40	
TEAM	Amanda Boggan	22,303	1.35	
TEAM	Charles Kelly	21,895	1.32	
TEAM	Josh Gordon	21,294	1.29	
Liberal	Moira Stilwell	20,844	1.26	
TEAM	Jonathan Weisman	19,746	1.19	
Liberal	Jessica Walton	18,970	1.15	
Liberal	John Coupar	17,362	1.05	
Vote Vancouver	Rebecca Hasdell	17,043	1.03	
TEAM	Raj Mundra	16,177	0.98	
Liberal	Michael Wu	15,748	0.95	
TEAM	Patrick Sauriol	15,356	0.93	
Liberal	Devin Clemens	14,373	0.87	
Liberal	Armor Valor	14,270	0.86	
Vote Vancouver	Geoff Teoli	11,086	0.67	
Vote Vancouver	John Boychuk	9,945	0.60	
Affordable Housing	Eric Redmond	9,543	0.58	
Vote Vancouver	Keerit Jutla	8,974	0.54	
Vote Vancouver	Steve Jedreicich	8,438	0.51	
Vote Vancouver	Bhavna Solecki	7,201	0.44	
Bright Future	Andy Lin	6,122	0.37	
Independent	John Jones	5,088	0.31	
Independent	Rollergirl	4,910	0.30	
Independent	Job Zhao	3,731	0.23	
Bright Future	Yadwinder Mangat	3,613	0.22	
Bright Future	Judith Kasiama	3,568	0.22	
TrueBlue	Naomi Chocyk	3,566	0.22	
Bright Future	Bilal Khan	2,989	0.18	
Independent	Guy Dubé	2,231	0.13	
Independent	Parris J. Williams	2,229	0.13	
Bright Future	Mohadeseh Gharib P. Arasi	2,185	0.13	
Bright Future	Ibrahima Cisse	2,122	0.13	
Independent	Noi Soudarack	838	0.05	
