= Rebecca Bligh =

Canadian politician

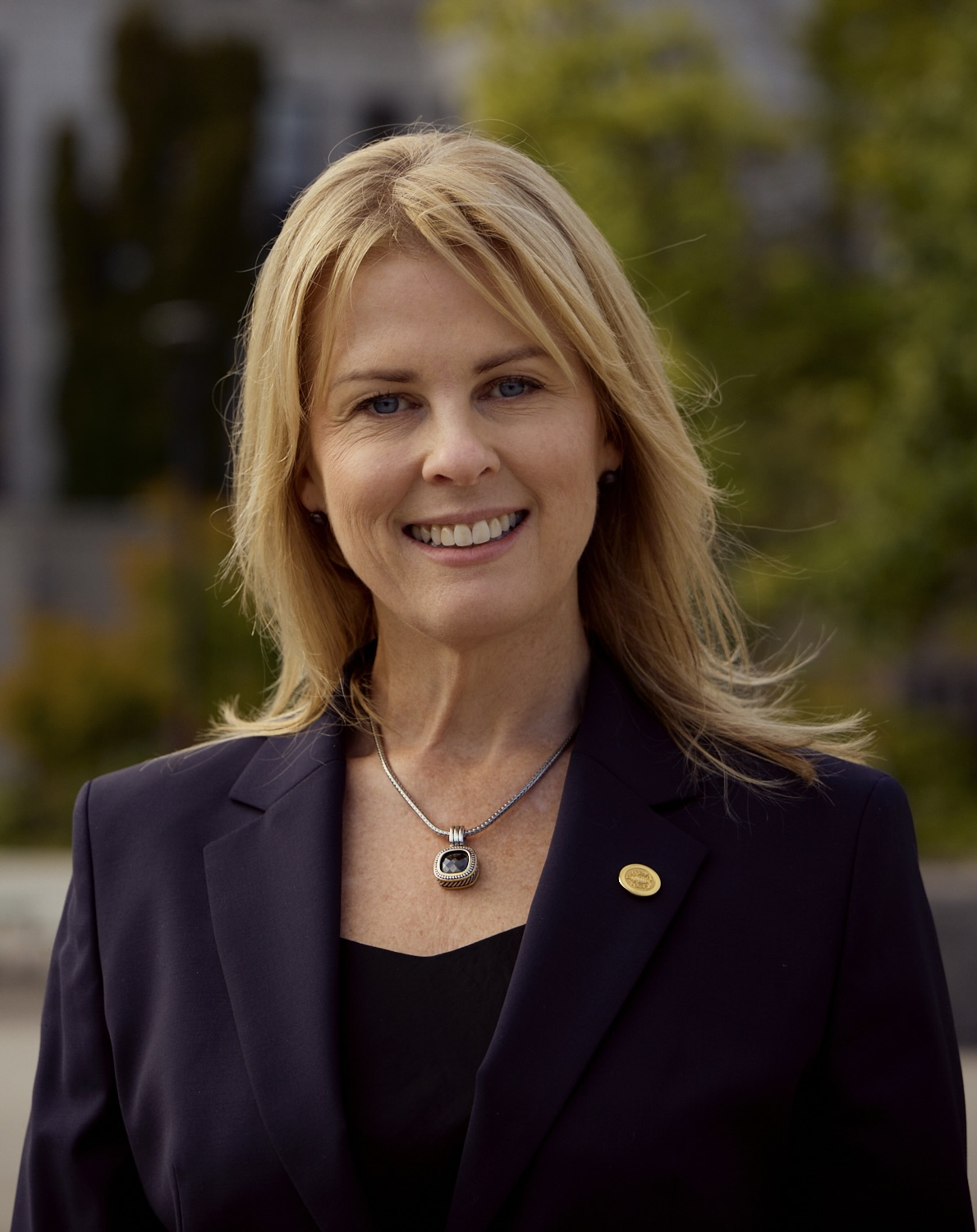
- Bligh in 2025

Vancouver City Councillor
- In office November 5, 2018 – November 2, 2026

President of Federation of Canadian Municipalities
- In office October 2024 – June 2026

Personal details
- Born: New Zealand
- Citizenship: Canada
- Party: Vote Vancouver (2025–present)
- Other political affiliations: ABC Vancouver (2022–2025); Non-Partisan Association (2018–2019); Independent (2019-2022, 2025)
- Spouse: Laura Appleton
- Children: 2

Rebecca Bligh is a Canadian politician who was a councillor on the Vancouver City Council in from 2018 to 2026. She is also a former president of the Federation of Canadian Municipalities, serving from 2024 to 2026.

She is a former member of the Non-Partisan Association and ABC Vancouver, under whose banners she was elected in 2018 and 2022, respectively. After being removed from the ABC caucus over policy disagreements in 2025, she founded a new party, Vote Vancouver. She ran to be the mayor of Vancouver in the 2026 Vancouver municipal election under the banner, placing fifth. She currently serves as head of the transition team of the new mayor, Pete Fry.

== Political career ==
First elected to the Vancouver City Council as a member of the center-right Non-Partisan Association (NPA), she left the party in 2019, citing concerns of a perceived "far-right" swing of the party following the election of two new executives affiliated with the anti-SOGI movement, stating, "As the only queer elected official with the NPA, I feel the party no longer represents or supports my choices, my identity, and everybody that believes in inclusion." Her concerns were echoed by 2018 NPA mayoral candidate Ken Sim, while Bligh's fellow NPA councillors Melissa De Genova, Lisa Dominato, Colleen Hardwick and Sarah Kirby-Yung did not leave the party but took steps to distance themselves from its board. By 2022, all except De Genova had quit the NPA, with Bligh, Dominato and Kirby-Yung affiliating with ABC Vancouver, and Hardwick joining TEAM for a Livable Vancouver.

As a candidate for ABC Vancouver, Bligh was re-elected to a second term in the Vancouver City Council in the 2022 Vancouver municipal election.

On February 14, 2025, Bligh was removed from the ABC Vancouver caucus. The removal came after multiple instances of Bligh contradicting other ABC councillors. In November 2024, Bligh voted against proposed bylaw amendments to allow the use of natural gas for heating in new building projects after a ban put in place by a previous council in 2020, contributing to the 5–5 tie that defeated the amendments and kept the ban. In January 2025, Bligh, along with fellow ABC councillor Lisa Dominato, disagreed with Vancouver mayor Ken Sim's plans to freeze new supportive housing projects in the city, stating that the severity of the homelessness crisis "outweighs what we're able to do as a municipality on our own" without support from the British Columbia provincial government. According to a statement from ABC party president Stephen Molnar concerning Bligh's removal from the caucus in February, "While [Bligh] remains a Vancouver City Councillor, it has become clear that she is not aligned with the shared priorities and team-oriented approach that defines ABC Vancouver." Bligh told reporters that Mayor Sim "abandoned the core principles" that motivated her to join the party.

From October 2024 to June 2026, Bligh served as the president of the Federation of Canadian Municipalities, which represents the interests of Canadian cities vis-a-vis the federal government.

On September 22, 2025, Bligh announced the formation of a new party, Vote Vancouver, and announced her intention to run for mayor of Vancouver in the 2026 Vancouver municipal election. She placed fifth with 4.21% of the vote, with Vote Vancouver failing to elect any councillors, park board members, or school board trustees. Since the inauguration of the new mayor Pete Fry on November 2, 2026, Bligh has served as head of Fry’s transition team.

== Personal life ==
She was born in New Zealand and immigrated to Canada with her parents when she was 10 years old. She is married to Laura Appleton, and they have two children. Prior to being elected to office, she founded a consulting and facilitation practice for executives and organizations.

== Electoral record ==
2026 Vancouver municipal election: Mayor
Party	Candidate	Votes	%	Elected
Green	Pete Fry	98,494	47.78	✓
ABC Vancouver	Ken Sim (incumbent)	67,467	32.73	
TEAM	Colleen Hardwick	18,105	8.78	
Liberal	Kareem Allam	10,580	5.13	
Vote Vancouver	Rebecca Bligh	8,681	4.21	
Bright Future	Muhammad Ahmad	1,352	0.66	
Independent	Scott Gilbert	1,135	0.55	
Independent	Amauri Caliman	347	0.17	
Source: CBC

2022 Vancouver municipal election: Vancouver City Council
Party	Candidate	Votes	%	Elected
ABC Vancouver	Sarah Kirby-Yung (X)	72,545	42.30	✓
ABC Vancouver	Lisa Dominato (X)	70,415	41.05	✓
ABC Vancouver	Brian Montague	68,618	40.01	✓
ABC Vancouver	Mike Klassen	65,586	38.24	✓
ABC Vancouver	Peter Meiszner	63,275	36.90	✓
ABC Vancouver	Rebecca Bligh (X)	62,765	36.60	✓
ABC Vancouver	Lenny Zhou	62,393	36.39	✓
Green	Adriane Carr (X)	41,831	24.39	✓
OneCity	Christine Boyle (X)	38,465	22.43	✓
Green	Pete Fry (X)	37,270	21.73	✓
Forward Together	Dulcy Anderson	33,985	19.82	
OneCity	Iona Bonamis	33,745	19.68	
Forward Together	Tesicca Truong	32,900	19.18	
COPE	Jean Swanson (X)	32,833	19.15	
Green	Michael Wiebe (X)	30,377	17.71	
OneCity	Ian Cromwell	29,833	17.40	
OneCity	Matthew Norris	29,663	17.30	
Forward Together	Alvin Singh	29,049	16.94	
NPA	Melissa De Genova (X)	26,578	15.50	
COPE	Breen Ouellette	24,881	14.51	
Forward Together	Jeanette Ashe	22,432	13.08	
Forward Together	Russil Wvong	22,107	12.89	
Green	Devyani Singh	21,255	12.39	
TEAM	Cleta Brown	20,854	12.16	
Green	Stephanie Smith	20,408	11.90	
Forward Together	Hilary Brown	19,902	11.61	
COPE	Nancy Trigueros	19,152	11.17	
TEAM	Sean Nardi	18,353	10.70	
TEAM	Grace Quan	17,955	10.47	
COPE	Tanya Webking	17,675	10.31	
TEAM	Bill Tieleman	17,240	10.05	
TEAM	Stephen Roberts	16,261	9.48	
Vision	Stuart Mackinnon	15,865	9.25	
NPA	Morning Lee	14,083	8.21	
TEAM	Param Nijjar	13,950	8.13	
VOTE Socialist	Sean Orr	13,744	8.01	
Progress Vancouver	Asha Hayer	13,107	7.64	
NPA	Ken Charko	12,083	7.47	
Vision	Lesli Boldt	11,070	6.46	
NPA	Elaine Allan	10,917	6.37	
Affordable Housing Coalition	Eric Redmond	10,617	6.19	
NPA	Arezo Zarrabian	10,361	6.04	
Progress Vancouver	Marie Noelle Rosa	10,111	5.90	
Progress Vancouver	Morgane Oger	10,015	5.84	
Progress Vancouver	David Chin	9,354	5.45	
Progress Vancouver	May He	8,593	5.01	
NPA	Cinnamon Bhayani	8,586	5.01	
Independent	Lina Vargas	7,714	4.50	
Vision	Honieh Barzegari	6,831	3.98	
Progress Vancouver	Mauro Francis	6,556	3.82	
Independent	Mark Bowen	5,706	3.33	
Independent	Dominic Denofrio	4,927	2.87	
Independent	Amy "Evil Genius" Fox	3,711	2.16	
Independent	Jeremy MacKenzie	3,446	2.01	
Independent	Kyra Philbert	3,382	1.97	
Independent	Tim Lý	3,339	1.95	
Independent	Marlo Franson	2,866	1.67	
Independent	Amie Peacock	2,745	1.60	
Independent	K. R. Alm	2,301	1.34	
"(X)" indicates incumbent city councillor. Percentage of votes shown is percentage of voters who voted, not votes cast.
Source: City of Vancouver

2018 Vancouver municipal election: City Council
Party	Candidate	Votes	%	Elected
Green	(I) Adriane Carr	69,739	39.52	✓
Green	Pete Fry	61,806	35.03	✓
NPA	(I) Melissa De Genova	53,251	30.18	✓
COPE	Jean Swanson	48,865	27.69	✓
NPA	Colleen Hardwick	47,747	27.06	✓
Green	(O) Michael Wiebe	45,593	25.84	✓
OneCity	Christine Boyle	45,455	25.76	✓
NPA	(O) Lisa Dominato	44,689	25.33	✓
NPA	Rebecca Bligh	44,053	24.97	✓
NPA	(O) Sarah Kirby-Yung	43,581	24.70	✓
NPA	David Grewal	41,913	23.75	
Green	David H. Wong	40,887	23.17	
Vision	(I) Heather Deal	39,529	22.40	
COPE	Derrick O'Keefe	38,305	21.71	
NPA	Justin P. Goodrich	37,917	21.49	
COPE	Anne Roberts	36,531	20.70	
OneCity	Brandon O. Yan	36,167	20.50	
NPA	Jojo Quimpo	34,601	19.61	
Independent	Sarah Blyth	29,456	16.69	
Vision	Tanya Paz	28,836	16.34	
Vision	Diego Cardona	27,325	15.49	
Vision	(O) Catherine Evans	25,124	14.24	
Independent	(O) Erin Shum	23,331	13.22	
Vancouver 1st	Ken Low	21,908	12.42	
Independent	Adrian Crook	17,392	9.86	
Vision	Wei Q. Zhang	16,734	9.48	
Coalition Vancouver	Ken Charko	16,366	9.28	
Coalition Vancouver	James Lin	16,191	9.18	
Independent	Wade Grant	15,422	8.74	
Independent	Taqdir K. Bhandal	15,326	8.69	
Vancouver 1st	Elizabeth Taylor	15,184	8.61	
Coalition Vancouver	Penny Mussio	14,886	8.44	
Yes Vancouver	Brinder Bains	13,948	7.90	
Yes Vancouver	Stephanie Ostler	13,530	7.67	
Coalition Vancouver	Jason Xie	13,424	7.61	
Yes Vancouver	Glynnis C. Chan	13,218	7.49	
Coalition Vancouver	Glen Chernen	13,148	7.45	
Coalition Vancouver	Morning Li	12,614	7.15	
Vancouver 1st	Nycki K. Basra	12,133	6.88	
Yes Vancouver	Jaspreet Virdi	12,124	6.87	
Coalition Vancouver	Franco Peta	11,193	6.34	
Yes Vancouver	Phyllis Tang	11,902	6.75	
Independent	Rob McDowell	11,828	6.70	
Independent	Penny Noble	11,435	6.48	
Independent	Graham Cook	11,084	6.28	
Vancouver 1st	Michelle C. Mollineaux	8,819	5.00	
ProVancouver	Raza Mirza	8,783	4.98	
Vancouver 1st	Jesse Johl	8,609	4.88	
Independent	Barbara Buchanan	8,180	4.64	
ProVancouver	Breton Crellin	7,856	4.45	
Vancouver 1st	Elishia Perosa	7,489	4.24	
Independent	Anastasia Koutalianos	7,469	4.23	
Independent	Abubakar Khan	7,239	4.10	
Vancouver 1st	John Malusa	6,597	3.74	
Independent	Lisa Kristiansen	6,506	3.69	
ProVancouver	Rohana D. Rezel	6,336	3.59	
Independent	Françoise Raunet	5,891	3.34	
Independent	Hamdy El-Rayes	5,381	3.05	
Independent	Hsin-Chen Fu	5,007	2.84	
Independent	Justin Caudwell	4,488	2.54	
Independent	Harry Miedzygorski	4,308	2.44	
Independent	Gordon T. Kennedy	4,297	2.44	
Independent	Ashley Hughes	3,965	2.25	
Independent	Kelly Alm	3,440	1.95	
Independent	Marlo Franson	3,316	1.88	
Independent	John Spark	3,287	1.86	
Independent	Katherine Ramdeen	3,082	1.75	
Independent	Spike Peachey	2,863	1.62	
Independent	Larry J. Falls	2,768	1.57	
Independent	Elke Porter	2,515	1.43	
Independent	Ted Copeland	1,946	1.10	
'(I)' denotes incumbent city councillors. '(O)' denotes incumbents of other municipal positions.
