= Jaime Stein =

Canadian politician

Jaime Stein MLA

Deputy Government Whip of the Legislative Assembly of British Columbia
- Incumbent
- Assumed office November 20, 2026
- Premier: Lorne Doerkson

Member of the British Columbia Legislative Assembly for Vancouver-Langara
- Incumbent
- Assumed office October 24, 2026
- Preceded by: Sunita Dhir

Personal details
- Party: BC Conservative
- Other political affiliations: BC Liberal (2024); ABC Vancouver (municipal)
- Education: Rotman School of Management (MBA); Toronto Metropolitan University (B.J.); McGill University

Jaime Stein MLA is a Canadian politician, business executive, and former broadcast journalist who has served as a member of the Legislative Assembly of British Columbia (MLA) representing the electoral district of Vancouver-Langara since 2026. He is a member of the Conservative Party.

== Early career and education ==
Stein was born and raised in Vancouver and graduated from Point Grey Secondary School.

From 2004 to 2006, Stein served as the radio play-by-play voice of the Toronto Argonauts of the Canadian Football League on AM640 Toronto.

== Political career ==
Stein was previously nominated as a BC United candidate in the 2024 British Columbia general election before the party suspended its campaign. He was also an ABC Vancouver candidate in the 2025 Vancouver City Council by-election.

In September 2026, Stein ran as a candidate for the BC Conservatives in the 2026 general election, running in the electoral district of Vancouver-Langara and won.

== Personal life ==
Stein lives in Vancouver with his wife Jessica and their three children.

== Electoral history ==
2026 British Columbia general election: Vancouver-Langara
Party	Candidate	Votes	%	±%	Expenditures
Conservative	Jaime Stein	8,275	50.45	+4.45	
New Democratic	Sunita Dhir	6,366	38.81	−9.51	
Green	John Atoyebi	1,317	8.03	+2.36	
CentreBC	Alan Beesley	413	2.52	—	
Total valid votes		16,371	99.81		
Total rejected ballots		31	0.19		
Turnout		16,402			
Registered voters					
Conservative gain from New Democratic		Swing		+6.99	
Source: Elections BC

Vancouver municipal by-election, April 5, 2025: Vancouver City Council Resignation of Christine Boyle and Adriane Carr
Party	Candidate	Votes	%	Elected
COPE	Sean Orr	34,448	50.69	✓
OneCity	Lucy Maloney	33,732	49.63	✓
TEAM	Colleen Hardwick	17,352	25.53	
Green	Annette Reilly	15,045	22.14	
TEAM	Theodore Abbott	11,581	17.04	
ABC Vancouver	Jaime Stein	9,267	13.64	
ABC Vancouver	Ralph Kaisers	8,915	13.12	
Independent	Jeanifer Decena	652	0.96	
Independent	Guy Dubé	459	0.68	
Independent	Karin Litzcke	433	0.64	
Independent	Rollergirl	404	0.59	
Independent	Charles Ling	352	0.52	
Independent	Gerry McGuire	276	0.41	
Total number of voters		67,962	100.00	
Rejected ballots		0	0.00	
Turnout		67,962	15.09	
Eligible voters		450,503	–	
Percentage of votes shown is percentage of voters who voted, not votes cast.
Source: City of Vancouver
