= Michael Wiebe =

Canadian politician

Vancouver City Councillor
- In office November 5, 2018 – November 7, 2022

Personal details
- Party: Green Party

Michael Wiebe is a Canadian politician who served on Vancouver City Council from 2018 to 2022 as a member of the Vancouver Green Party. He also served as a commissioner on the Vancouver Park Board.

== Political career ==
Wiebe was elected to Vancouver City Council in the October 2018 municipal election. In 2020, an independent conflict-of-interest investigation concluded that he had violated conflict-of-interest rules and recommended his resignation or removal. Wiebe denied wrongdoing, stating that he had a "good faith belief" that he did not have a conflict.

He was not re-elected in the 2022 Vancouver municipal election.

== Electoral record ==
2022 Vancouver municipal election: Vancouver City Council
Party	Candidate	Votes	%	Elected
ABC Vancouver	Sarah Kirby-Yung (X)	72,545	42.30	✓
ABC Vancouver	Lisa Dominato (X)	70,415	41.05	✓
ABC Vancouver	Brian Montague	68,618	40.01	✓
ABC Vancouver	Mike Klassen	65,586	38.24	✓
ABC Vancouver	Peter Meiszner	63,275	36.90	✓
ABC Vancouver	Rebecca Bligh (X)	62,765	36.60	✓
ABC Vancouver	Lenny Zhou	62,393	36.39	✓
Green	Adriane Carr (X)	41,831	24.39	✓
OneCity	Christine Boyle (X)	38,465	22.43	✓
Green	Pete Fry (X)	37,270	21.73	✓
Forward Together	Dulcy Anderson	33,985	19.82	
OneCity	Iona Bonamis	33,745	19.68	
Forward Together	Tesicca Truong	32,900	19.18	
COPE	Jean Swanson (X)	32,833	19.15	
Green	Michael Wiebe (X)	30,377	17.71	
OneCity	Ian Cromwell	29,833	17.40	
OneCity	Matthew Norris	29,663	17.30	
Forward Together	Alvin Singh	29,049	16.94	
NPA	Melissa De Genova (X)	26,578	15.50	
COPE	Breen Ouellette	24,881	14.51	
Forward Together	Jeanette Ashe	22,432	13.08	
Forward Together	Russil Wvong	22,107	12.89	
Green	Devyani Singh	21,255	12.39	
TEAM	Cleta Brown	20,854	12.16	
Green	Stephanie Smith	20,408	11.90	
Forward Together	Hilary Brown	19,902	11.61	
COPE	Nancy Trigueros	19,152	11.17	
TEAM	Sean Nardi	18,353	10.70	
TEAM	Grace Quan	17,955	10.47	
COPE	Tanya Webking	17,675	10.31	
TEAM	Bill Tieleman	17,240	10.05	
TEAM	Stephen Roberts	16,261	9.48	
Vision	Stuart Mackinnon	15,865	9.25	
NPA	Morning Lee	14,083	8.21	
TEAM	Param Nijjar	13,950	8.13	
VOTE Socialist	Sean Orr	13,744	8.01	
Progress Vancouver	Asha Hayer	13,107	7.64	
NPA	Ken Charko	12,083	7.47	
Vision	Lesli Boldt	11,070	6.46	
NPA	Elaine Allan	10,917	6.37	
Affordable Housing Coalition	Eric Redmond	10,617	6.19	
NPA	Arezo Zarrabian	10,361	6.04	
Progress Vancouver	Marie Noelle Rosa	10,111	5.90	
Progress Vancouver	Morgane Oger	10,015	5.84	
Progress Vancouver	David Chin	9,354	5.45	
Progress Vancouver	May He	8,593	5.01	
NPA	Cinnamon Bhayani	8,586	5.01	
Independent	Lina Vargas	7,714	4.50	
Vision	Honieh Barzegari	6,831	3.98	
Progress Vancouver	Mauro Francis	6,556	3.82	
Independent	Mark Bowen	5,706	3.33	
Independent	Dominic Denofrio	4,927	2.87	
Independent	Amy "Evil Genius" Fox	3,711	2.16	
Independent	Jeremy MacKenzie	3,446	2.01	
Independent	Kyra Philbert	3,382	1.97	
Independent	Tim Lý	3,339	1.95	
Independent	Marlo Franson	2,866	1.67	
Independent	Amie Peacock	2,745	1.60	
Independent	K. R. Alm	2,301	1.34	

2018 Vancouver municipal election: Vancouver City Council
Party	Candidate	Votes	Elected
Green	Adriane Carr	69,739	✓
Green	Pete Fry	61,806	✓
NPA	Melissa De Genova	53,251	✓
COPE	Jean Swanson	48,865	✓
NPA	Colleen Hardwick	47,747	✓
Green	Michael Wiebe	45,593	✓
OneCity	Christine Boyle	45,455	✓
NPA	Lisa Dominato	44,689	✓
NPA	Rebecca Bligh	44,053	✓
NPA	Sarah Kirby-Yung	43,581	✓

2014 Vancouver municipal election: Vancouver Park Board
Party	Candidate	Votes	Elected
Vision	Catherine Evans	64,707	✓
NPA	John Coupar	62,970	✓
NPA	Casey Crawford	59,882	✓
NPA	Sarah Kirby-Yung	56,828	✓
NPA	Erin Shum	56,762	✓
Green	Stuart Mackinnon	56,406	✓
Green	Michael Wiebe	55,607	✓
Vision	Brent Granby	54,215	
