= CityCaucus.com =

Canadian news websites

City Caucus
- Website type: Political blog
- Available in: English
- Website: citycaucus.com
- Launched: December 7, 2008
- Current status: Ceased operations on July 3, 2012

CityCaucus.com was a well-known online multi-author blog focused on coverage of Vancouver municipal civic affairs. It was co-founded by Daniel Fontaine, the former chief of staff of Vancouver Mayor Sam Sullivan, and Mike Klassen, the former vice chair of the Vancouver City Planning Commission. During the Vancouver 2010 Olympics the blog offered a popular free-event guide. The blog was called partisan by some while being acknowledged for its investigative reporting, and being at the front of political conversation in Vancouver. The blog broke the 2010 story on Vancouver city staff being unhappy and having fears of aggressive agenda implementation by the ruling Vision Vancouver party. The Vancouver municipal government made an unprecedented decision to respond to the blog's criticism of a trade mission to China in September 2010.
