= 2022 Vancouver municipal election =

Vancouver municipal election

- October 15, 2022

10 seats on Vancouver City Council + 1 mayor; 9 seats on Vancouver School Board; 7 seats on Vancouver Park Board
- Turnout: 36.3% ▼3.4 pp
- Mayoral election
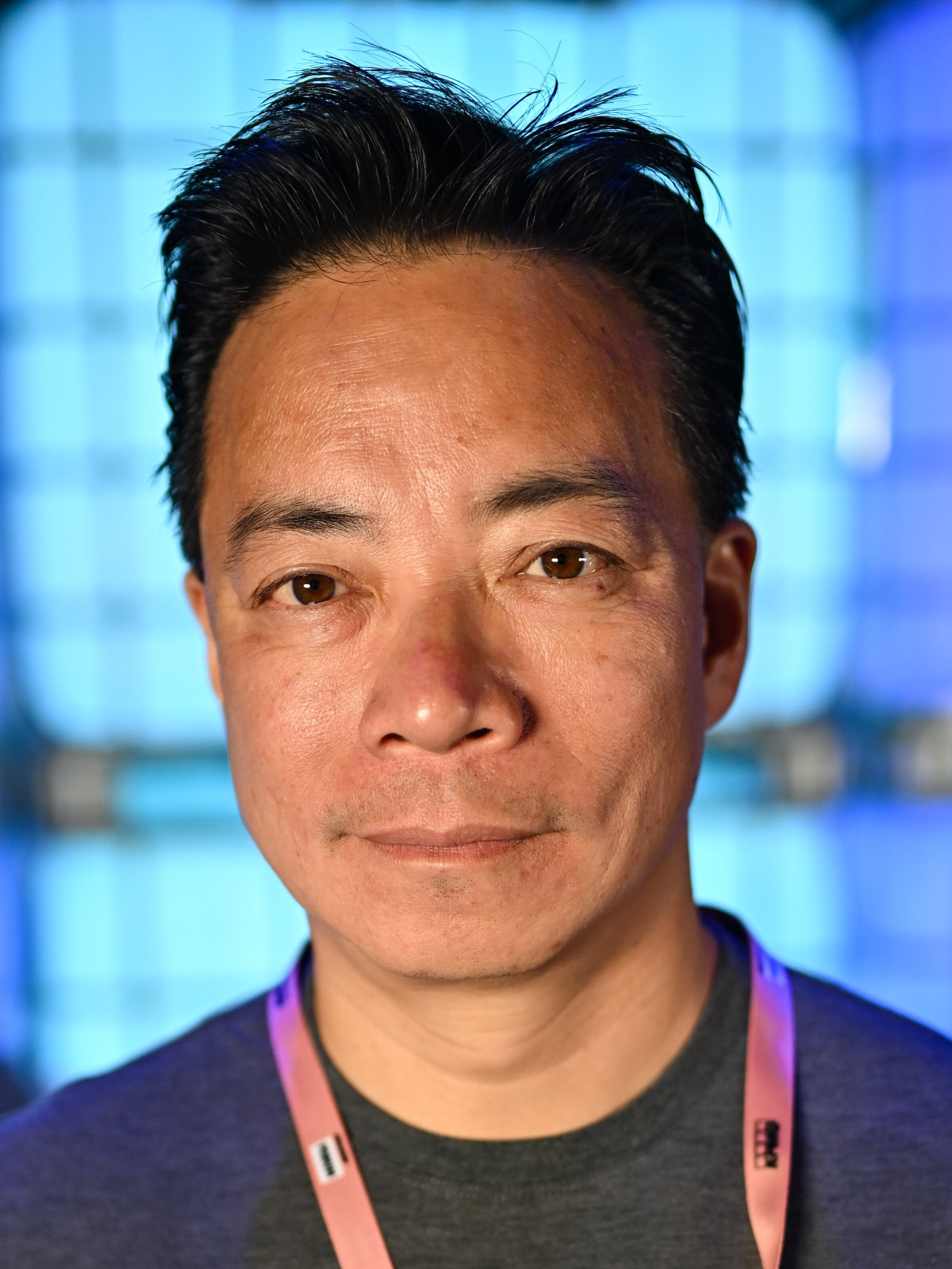

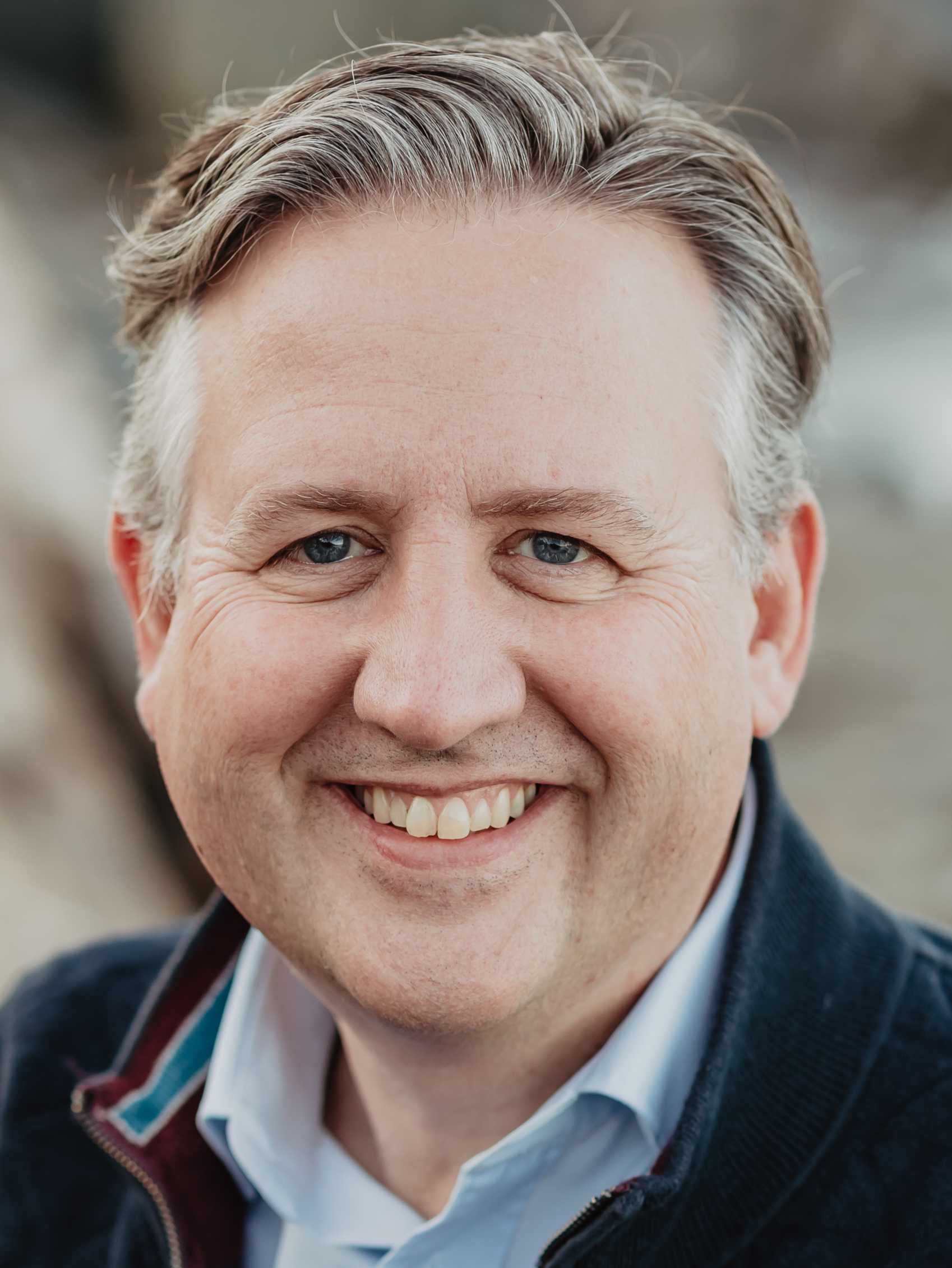

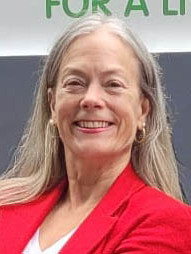
	First party	Second party	Third party
Candidate	Ken Sim	Kennedy Stewart	Colleen Hardwick
Party	ABC Vancouver	Forward Together	TEAM
Popular vote	85,732	49,593	16,769
Percentage	50.96%	29.48%	9.97%
Swing	▲22.8 pp	▲0.8 pp	N/A
- Mayoral results on a Voronoi diagram of polling stations
Mayor before election
Kennedy Stewart
Forward Together
Elected mayor
Ken Sim
ABC Vancouver
- City council election
Party	Vote %	Seats	+/–
ABC Vancouver	34.58	7	+7
Green	11.24	2	−1
OneCity	9.79	1	0
This lists parties that won seats. See the complete results below.
- Park board election
Party	Vote %	Seats	+/–
ABC Vancouver	41.70	6	+6
Green	8.47	1	−2
This lists parties that won seats. See the complete results below.
- School board election
Party	Vote %	Seats	+/–
ABC Vancouver	32.51	4	+4
Green	11.10	2	−1
OneCity	19.45	1	0
COPE	7.08	1	0
This lists parties that won seats. See the complete results below.

The 2022 Vancouver municipal election was held on October 15, 2022, the same day as the municipal elections held throughout British Columbia. Voters elected the mayor of Vancouver by first-past-the-post. Ten city councillors, 7 park board commissioners, and 9 school board trustees were elected through plurality at-large voting. In addition, voters were presented with 3 capital plan questions.

Across the city, 171,494 voters cast ballots. ABC Vancouver won seven of the 11 seats on council, electing its entire slate.

== Background ==
Kennedy Stewart was elected to replace outgoing mayor Gregor Robertson in the 2018 mayoral election. Stewart won by just under 1,000 votes against runner-up Ken Sim and was sworn in on November 5, 2018. The city council election, held on the same day, had no party win an outright majority.

The election was scheduled on October 15, 2022, at the same time as all other municipal elections in British Columbia. Canadian citizens over the age of 18 were eligible to vote. Voters voted for the mayor, city council, park board commissioners, school board trustees, and 3 capital plan questions.

In the 2018–2022 term, the Non-Partisan Association (NPA) experienced an internal conflict with 4 of its 5 city councillors leaving the caucus, first sitting as independents before joining new parties. The councillors cited the lack of open nomination process and lack of transparency in the selection of the party's initial mayoral candidate, John Coupar. In addition to the councillors, 3 of the NPA's school board trustees left the party over the same conflict.

== Candidates and campaign ==
=== Mayoral campaign ===
Incumbent mayor Kennedy Stewart ran for re-election. Stewart, elected as an independent in 2018, stated his intention to run under his own political party during the 2022 election, and recruited candidates to stand for the 2022 city council election. Stewart said he was additionally open to cross-endorsing candidates from other parties. Stewart later formed a party called Forward Together.

2018 NPA mayoral candidate Ken Sim ran again with the new ABC Vancouver party. Sim's first policy proposal was to abolish the elected park board, but he later renounced that position when his party nominated candidates to be elected to the park board.

The NPA initially nominated park board commissioner John Coupar as their mayoral candidate. Citing a lack of transparency in his nomination process, three of the four NPA remaining city councillors left the party to sit as independents. Of the three, Colleen Hardwick and Sarah Kirby-Yung were speculated to have considered running for mayor before being sidelined in favour of Coupar. John Coupar resigned as NPA candidate on August 5, 2022, after a meeting with the party's board about the "progress of the campaign." Coupar was replaced by Fred Harding, who came sixth in the 2018 mayoral election as the Vancouver 1st candidate.

Colleen Hardwick, one of the ex-NPA councillors, ran for mayor with TEAM for a Livable Vancouver. The party's name is a reference to Hardwick's father's party, The Electors' Action Movement.

Liberal Party strategist Mark Marissen announced his mayoral campaign in 2021. Marissen was later nominated by Progress Vancouver, the successor to Yes Vancouver.

Jody Wilson-Raybould, former MP for Vancouver Granville, declined to run. Shauna Sylvester, 2018 third place mayoral candidate, declined to run again. Green Party councillor Adriane Carr considered running for mayor before declining to run in April 2022.

==== Results ====
2022 Vancouver municipal election: Mayor
Party	Candidate	Votes	%	Elected
ABC Vancouver	Ken Sim	85,732	50.96	✓
Forward Together	Kennedy Stewart (incumbent)	49,593	29.48	
TEAM	Colleen Hardwick	16,769	9.97	
Progress Vancouver	Mark Marissen	5,830	3.47	
NPA	Fred Harding	3,905	2.32	
Independent	Leona Brown	1,519	0.9	
Independent	Ping Chan	1,154	0.69	
Independent	Françoise Raunet	1,116	0.66	
Independent	Satwant Shottha	994	0.59	
Independent	Imtiaz Popat	411	0.24	
Independent	Lewis Villegas	363	0.22	
Independent	Mike Hansen	314	0.19	
Independent	Gölök Buday	195	0.12	
Independent	Ryan Charmley	183	0.11	
Independent	Dante Teti	142	0.08	
ABC Vancouver **gain** from Forward Together		Swing		+11.02 (Note: Calculated using Ken Sim's and Kennedy Stewart's 2018 results.)
Source: City of Vancouver

=== City council ===
All 10 members of Vancouver city council stated their intention on running again during the 2022 municipal election, in addition to mayor Kennedy Stewart. City councillor for the Coalition of Progressive Electors, Jean Swanson, was the last of the 11 members of city council to announce her intention to run again.

OneCity announced the results of their nomination race on March 7, 2022, becoming the first party to nominate a slate of candidates. Incumbent OneCity councillor Christine Boyle was re-nominated, with three new nominees: president of the Urban Native Youth Association Matthew Norris, urban planner Iona Bonamis, and health economist Ian Cromwell.

Adriane Carr of the Vancouver Greens considered running for mayor, but ultimately decided to seek re-election to council in order to avoid splitting the centre-left vote with Mayor Kennedy Stewart. The Greens held a special meeting to select council candidates, renominating Carr and the party's two other incumbent councillors, Pete Fry and Michael Wiebe, along with labour activist Stephanie Smith and climate scientist and financial analyst Devyani Singh.

On April 8, COPE held nominations for all offices, with incumbent councillor Jean Swanson re-nominated to lead a council slate consisting of 2021 Vancouver Centre NDP candidate Breen Ouellette, human rights lawyer Nancy Trigueros, and Indigenous activist Tanya Webking.

On April 11, incumbent councillors Sarah Kirby-Yung, Lisa Dominato, and Rebecca Bligh announced they had joined Ken Sim's new ABC Vancouver party and would run for re-election under that banner.

On May 2, Vision Vancouver announced a slate of four city council candidates. The candidates include Stuart Mackinnon (previously elected as a Green Party park board commissioner), Honieh Barzegari, Lesli Boldt, and Kishone Roy. Roy withdrew for personal reasons on August 16.

On May 25, the NPA announced six city council candidates and four park board candidates. Incumbent councillor Melissa De Genova was re-selected, alongside Elaine Allan, Cinnamon Bhayani, Ken Charko, Mauro Francis, and Arezo Zarrabian. Incumbent parks commissioner Tricia Barker was re-selected, with new candidates Ray Goldenchild, and Dave Pasin. On August 9, Mauro Francis left the party for Progress Vancouver, stating the "internal dynamics of the NPA" after John Coupar's resignation were "getting in the way of the campaign."

On June 11, Colleen Hardwick's TEAM for a Livable Vancouver announced six city council candidates: Cleta Brown, Sean Nardi, Param Nijjar, Grace Quan, Stephen Roberts, and Bill Tieleman.

On June 26, Forward Together, Kennedy Stewart's new municipal party, announced its first three city council candidates: Russil Wvong, Dulcy Anderson, and Hilary Brown.

Election was conducted using plurality block voting with each voter able to cast ten votes. More than 1.3 million votes were cast in this election by 170,000 voters. 58 candidates ran for city council seats.

==== Results ====
(Percentage of votes shown is percentage of voters who voted, not votes cast.)

Legend
**Bold**	Denotes elected candidates
(X)	Denotes incumbent candidates

2022 Vancouver municipal election: Vancouver City Council
Party	Candidate	Votes	%	Elected
ABC Vancouver	Sarah Kirby-Yung (X)	72,545	42.30	✓
ABC Vancouver	Lisa Dominato (X)	70,415	41.05	✓
ABC Vancouver	Brian Montague	68,618	40.01	✓
ABC Vancouver	Mike Klassen	65,586	38.24	✓
ABC Vancouver	Peter Meiszner	63,275	36.90	✓
ABC Vancouver	Rebecca Bligh (X)	62,765	36.60	✓
ABC Vancouver	Lenny Zhou	62,393	36.39	✓
Green	Adriane Carr (X)	41,831	24.39	✓
OneCity	Christine Boyle (X)	38,465	22.43	✓
Green	Pete Fry (X)	37,270	21.73	✓
Forward Together	Dulcy Anderson	33,985	19.82	
OneCity	Iona Bonamis	33,745	19.68	
Forward Together	Tesicca Truong	32,900	19.18	
COPE	Jean Swanson (X)	32,833	19.15	
Green	Michael Wiebe (X)	30,377	17.71	
OneCity	Ian Cromwell	29,833	17.40	
OneCity	Matthew Norris	29,663	17.30	
Forward Together	Alvin Singh	29,049	16.94	
NPA	Melissa De Genova (X)	26,578	15.50	
COPE	Breen Ouellette	24,881	14.51	
Forward Together	Jeanette Ashe	22,432	13.08	
Forward Together	Russil Wvong	22,107	12.89	
Green	Devyani Singh	21,255	12.39	
TEAM	Cleta Brown	20,854	12.16	
Green	Stephanie Smith	20,408	11.90	
Forward Together	Hilary Brown	19,902	11.61	
COPE	Nancy Trigueros	19,152	11.17	
TEAM	Sean Nardi	18,353	10.70	
TEAM	Grace Quan	17,955	10.47	
COPE	Tanya Webking	17,675	10.31	
TEAM	Bill Tieleman	17,240	10.05	
TEAM	Stephen Roberts	16,261	9.48	
Vision	Stuart Mackinnon	15,865	9.25	
NPA	Morning Lee	14,083	8.21	
TEAM	Param Nijjar	13,950	8.13	
VOTE Socialist	Sean Orr	13,744	8.01	
Progress Vancouver	Asha Hayer	13,107	7.64	
NPA	Ken Charko	12,083	7.47	
Vision	Lesli Boldt	11,070	6.46	
NPA	Elaine Allan	10,917	6.37	
Affordable Housing Coalition	Eric Redmond	10,617	6.19	
NPA	Arezo Zarrabian	10,361	6.04	
Progress Vancouver	Marie Noelle Rosa	10,111	5.90	
Progress Vancouver	Morgane Oger	10,015	5.84	
Progress Vancouver	David Chin	9,354	5.45	
Progress Vancouver	May He	8,593	5.01	
NPA	Cinnamon Bhayani	8,586	5.01	
Independent	Lina Vargas	7,714	4.50	
Vision	Honieh Barzegari	6,831	3.98	
Progress Vancouver	Mauro Francis	6,556	3.82	
Independent	Mark Bowen	5,706	3.33	
Independent	Dominic Denofrio	4,927	2.87	
Independent	Amy "Evil Genius" Fox	3,711	2.16	
Independent	Jeremy MacKenzie	3,446	2.01	
Independent	Kyra Philbert	3,382	1.97	
Independent	Tim Lý	3,339	1.95	
Independent	Marlo Franson	2,866	1.67	
Independent	Amie Peacock	2,745	1.60	
Independent	K. R. Alm	2,301	1.34	
"(X)" indicates incumbent city councillor. Percentage of votes shown is percentage of voters who voted, not votes cast.
Source: City of Vancouver

Party	Seats
ABC Vancouver	7 / 10
Green Party of Vancouver	2 / 10
OneCity Vancouver	1 / 10

=== Park board ===
Park Board commissioner John Irwin announced on March 17, 2022, that he was leaving COPE to join Vision Vancouver, sitting out the remainder of his term as a Vision Vancouver member.

Green Party Park Board commissioner Stuart Mackinnon announced his intention to run for City Council under the Vision Vancouver party on April 25, 2022.

==== Results ====
2022 Vancouver municipal election: Vancouver Park Board
Party	Candidate	Votes	%	Elected
ABC Vancouver	**Scott Jensen**	**71,174**	**41.50**	✓
ABC Vancouver	**Angela Kate Haer**	**63,635**	**37.11**	✓
ABC Vancouver	**Laura Christensen**	**63,618**	**37.10**	✓
ABC Vancouver	**Marie-Claire Howard**	**63,408**	**36.97**	✓
ABC Vancouver	**Jas Virdi**	**58,709**	**34.23**	✓
ABC Vancouver	**Brennan Bastyovanszky**	**58,247**	**33.96**	✓
Green	**Tom Digby**	**39,243**	**22.88**	✓
Green	Tricia Riley	37,773	22.03	
OneCity	Caitlin Stockwell	36,856	21.49	
OneCity	Tiyaltelut Kristen Rivers	33,713	19.66	
OneCity	Serena Jackson	33,070	19.28	
COPE	Gwen Giesbrecht (X)	32,257	18.81	
COPE	Chris Livingstone	30,539	17.81	
COPE	Maira Hassan	27,708	16.16	
Vision	John Irwin (X)	27,186	15.85	
TEAM	Tricia Barker (X)	25,615	14.94	
Vision	Carla Frenkel	25,415	14.82	
TEAM	Kathleen Larsen	21,418	12.49	
TEAM	Kumi Kimura	19,394	11.31	
TEAM	Michelle Mollineaux	15,943	9.30	
VOTE Socialist	Andrea Pinochet-Escudero	15,526	9.05	
TEAM	Patrick Audley	14,681	8.56	
NPA	Jason Upton	13,921	8.12	
TEAM	James Buckshon	13,222	7.71	
NPA	Dave Pasin	12,006	7.00	
NPA	Dehara September	9,669	5.64	
Independent	Tracy D. Smith	8,932	5.21	
NPA	Olga Zarudina	8,712	5.08	
Independent	Liam Murphy Menard	8,014	4.67	
Independent	Steven Craig	7,907	4.61	
Independent	Nick Charrette	5,526	3.22	
Independent	RollerGirl	5,453	3.18	
Source: City of Vancouver

Party	Seats
ABC Vancouver	6 / 7
Green Party of Vancouver	1 / 7

=== School board ===
==== Results ====
2022 Vancouver municipal election: Vancouver School Board
Party	Candidate	Votes	%	Elected
ABC Vancouver	**Victoria Jung**	**69,027**	**40.25**	✓
ABC Vancouver	**Alfred Chien**	**67,326**	**39.26**	✓
ABC Vancouver	**Josh Zhang**	**64,370**	**37.53**	✓
ABC Vancouver	**Christopher JK Richardson** (Note: Richardson was ejected from ABC Vancouver after the ballot deadline. The party said he would not sit in their caucus.)	**64,048**	**37.35**	✓
ABC Vancouver	**Preeti Faridkot**	**63,807**	**37.21**	✓
OneCity	**Jennifer Reddy** (X)	**44,534**	**25.97**	✓
COPE	**Suzie Mah**	**42,379**	**24.71**	✓
Green	**Lois Chan-Pedley** (X)	**41,356**	**24.12**	✓
Green	**Janet Fraser** (X)	**41,179**	**24.01**	✓
OneCity	Krista Sigurdson	40,792	23.79	
OneCity	Kyla Epstein	38,890	22.68	
OneCity	Rory Brown	38,381	22.38	
Vision	Allan Wong (X)	35,761	20.85	
OneCity	Gavin Somers	33,933	19.79	
Vision	Steve Cardwell	31,045	18.10	
Vision	Aaron Leung	30,007	17.50	
Green	Nick Poppell	29,729	17.34	
COPE	Rocco Trigueros	29,167	17.01	
Vision	Hilary Thompson	28,324	16.52	
Vision	Kera McArthur	23,902	13.94	
TEAM	Matiul Alam	20,772	12.11	
NPA	Rahul Aggarwal	18,488	10.78	
VOTE Socialist	Karina Zeidler	17,710	10.33	
NPA	Ashley Vaughan	17,206	10.03	
NPA	Aaron Fedora	15,733	9.17	
NPA	Nadine C. Goodine	15,051	8.78	
NPA	Milan Kljajic	13,522	7.88	
Independent	Amanda Tengco	9,668	5.64	
Independent	Zelda Levine	8,875	5.18	
Independent	Karin Litzcke	8,570	5.00	
Independent	Heming Hopkins	7,416	4.32	

Party	Seats
ABC Vancouver	4 / 9
Green Party of Vancouver	2 / 9
Independent	1 / 9
OneCity Vancouver	1 / 9
COPE	1 / 9

=== Referendums ===
Voters were presented with three ballot questions on capital plan borrowing. All borrowing was assented to.

==== Transportation and core operating technology ====
The first question was on borrowing $173,450,000 for bridge and street infrastructure, traffic signals and street lighting, electrical services in public places, and core operating technology.

Transportation and core operating technology
Choice	Votes	%
For	116,591	77.96
Against	32,964	22.04
**Total**	**149,555**	**100.00**
Registered voters/turnout	472,665	31.64
Source: City of Vancouver

==== Community facilities ====
The second question was on borrowing $162,075,000 to be spent on renewal of the Vancouver Aquatic Centre and renewal and upgrades of various other community facilities, including childcare.

Community facilities
Choice	Votes	%
For	101,715	68.32
Against	47,163	31.68
**Total**	**148,878**	**100.00**
Registered voters/turnout	472,665	31.49
Source: City of Vancouver

==== Parks, public safety and other civic facilities, climate adaptation and other priorities emerging priorities ====
The third question was on borrowing $159,475,000 for renewal and upgrading of parks, renewal or rehabilitation of public safety and other civic facilities, including a fire hall, animal shelter and/or other civic facility projects. Climate adaptation projects such as seawall reconstruction, urban canopy, and other projects, and additional funding for "transportation, community facilities, parks, civic facilities and technology, and/or other emerging priorities".

Parks, public safety and other civic facilities, climate adaptation and other priorities emerging priorities
Choice	Votes	%
For	114,254	76.25
Against	35,582	23.75
**Total**	**149,836**	**100.00**
Registered voters/turnout	472,665	31.70
Source: City of Vancouver

== Political parties ==
Party	Leader	Ideology	Position	Notes	Council candidates nominated
ABC Vancouver	Ken Sim	Liberal conservatism	Centre to centre-right	Formed by former NPA mayoral candidate Ken Sim, who was chosen as the party's mayoral candidate in October 2021. Rebecca Bligh, Lisa Dominato, and Sarah Kirby-Yung, all elected under the NPA banner in 2018, ran as ABC candidates in the 2022 municipal election.	8 / 11
Affordable Housing Coalition	Eric Redmond	Centrism	Centre	Party platform included creating affordable housing through progressive property tax, rent control, streamlined permitting, land appreciation taxes, and increased density.	1 / 11
Coalition of Progressive Electors	Tristan Markle; Nancy Trigueros	Democratic socialism	Left-wing		4 / 11
Forward Together	Kennedy Stewart	Social democracy	Centre-left		7 / 11
Green Party of Vancouver	Adriane Carr (de facto)	Green politics	Centre to centre-left	Green Party councillor Adriane Carr considered running for mayor but ultimately chose to run for re-election as councillor.	5 / 11
Non-Partisan Association	David Mawhinney	Conservatism	Centre-right to right-wing	Initially nominated parks commissioner John Coupar as its mayoral candidate, who previously contested the 2018 party nomination, but lost to Ken Sim. Coupar resigned in August and was replaced by Fred Harding.	7 / 11
OneCity Vancouver	Cara Ng; Laura Track	Social democracy	Centre-left to left-wing		4 / 11
Progress Vancouver	Scott de Lange Boom	Social liberalism Pro-development	Centre to centre-right	Formerly known as YES Vancouver. Mark Marissen, political strategist and former husband of Premier of British Columbia Christy Clark, was nominated to run for mayor.	7 / 11
TEAM for a Livable Vancouver	Elizabeth Murphy	Localism; Conservatism	Centre-right	Formed by councillor Colleen Hardwick, formerly a member of the NPA, who ran as its mayoral candidate.	7 / 11
VOTE Socialist	Collective leadership	Democratic socialism	Left-wing	A political platform by the Democratic Socialists of Vancouver running on a 10-point plan including defunding the VPD and reallocating its funding, and policies against gentrification.	1 / 11
Vision Vancouver	Aaron Leung; Janet Wiegand	Green liberalism	Centre to centre-left	Vision Vancouver stated it would focus on winning seats on the city council following its loss in the 2018 municipal election.	3 / 11

== Opinion polls ==
Mayoral candidates
Polling firm	Client	Dates conducted	Source	Stewart	Sim	Hardwick	NPA	Marissen	Other	Margin of error	Sample size	Polling method	Lead
2022 election	—N/a	October 15, 2022		29.5%	51.0%	10.0%	2.3%	3.5%	3.7%	—N/a	171,494	—N/a	21.5%
Research Co.	—N/a	October 13–14, 2022		33%	33%	16%	8%	8%	2%	±5.3%	400	Online	0%
Mainstreet (Note: Poll of all voters, including undecided voters. Data was updated for consistency to reflect only decided voters.)	iPolitics	October 2–6, 2022		27.6%	33.9%	17.2%	6.4%	9.5%	5.3%	±2.6%	1,377	IVR	6.3%
Leger	Postmedia	September 29 – October 5, 2022		21%	50%	21%	2%	2%	6%	±4.0%	601	Online	29%
Forum Research	TEAM	October 4, 2022		24.4%	34.3%	21.2%	7.7%	8.1%	4.5%	±4.9%	408	IVR	9.9%
Research Co.	VDLC	September 22–26, 2022		36%	34%	14%	5%	8%	3%	±4.9%	422	Online	2%
Research Co.	—N/a	September 3–5, 2022		35%	30%	17%	4%	13%	2%	±4.9%	400	Online	5%
		August 30, 2022	Fred Harding is appointed as the NPA's mayoral nominee										
		August 5, 2022	John Coupar resigns as the NPA's mayoral nominee										
Forum Research	TEAM	Late July 2022		23.7%	28.4%	22.9%	11.4%	5.2%	8.5%	±5.2%	358	IVR	4.7%
Mainstreet	iPolitics	July 25–27, 2022		28.6%	18.2%	22.1%	10.2%	18.9%	2.2%	±4.2%	552	IVR	6.5%
Research Co.	VDLC	April 2022		41%	26%	19%	8%	8%	—N/a	—N/a	419	Online	15%
Abacus	Ken Sim	June 4–16, 2021		31%	33.3%	4.8%	2.4%	2.4%	23.8%	±3.1%	1,000	Online/IVR	2.3%
Research Co.	VDLC	May 3–5, 2021		38%	16%	—N/a	5%	5%	36%	±4.9%	400	Online	22%
Sutherland	—N/a	April 20–22, 2021		30.8%	20.7%	—N/a	6.1%	4.9%	42.7%	±4.1%	1,308	IVR	10.1%

== Endorsements ==
Kennedy Stewart (Forward Together)

Members of Parliament

- Jenny Kwan (MP for Vancouver East)
- Jagmeet Singh (leader of the New Democratic Party of Canada, MP for Burnaby South)

Provincial and territorial politicians

- Brenda Bailey (MLA for Vancouver-False Creek)
- Katrina Chen (Minister of State for Child Care, MLA for Burnaby-Lougheed)
- Adrian Dix (Minister of Health, MLA for Vancouver-Kingsway)
- David Eby (MLA for Vancouver-Point Grey, former Attorney General of British Columbia)
- George Heyman (Minister of Environment and Climate Change, MLA for Vancouver-Fairview)

Former members of Parliament

- Libby Davies (former MP for Vancouver East, former MLA for Vancouver-Mount Pleasant, former Vancouver city councillor)

Former provincial and territorial politicians

- Mike Harcourt (former premier of British Columbia, former mayor of Vancouver)
- Joy MacPhail (former deputy premier of British Columbia, former MLA for Vancouver-Hastings)
- Shane Simpson (former MLA for Vancouver-Hastings)

Former municipal politicians

- Sarah Blyth (executive director of Vancouver Overdose Prevention Society, former Park Board commissioner)

Organizations

- CUPE BC
- Vancouver & District Labour Council
- Vancouver Fire Fighters Local 18
- Vision Vancouver

Other prominent individuals

- Tzeporah Berman (environmental activist, co-founder of Stand.earth)
- Thomas Davidoff (associate professor at UBC Sauder School of Business)
- Carleen Thomas (chancellor of Emily Carr University of Art and Design, former Tsleil-Waututh First Nation councillor)
Ken Sim (ABC Vancouver)

Former municipal politicians

- Tung Chan (former Vancouver city councillor)

Organizations

- Vancouver Police Union

Other prominent individuals

- Donovan Tildesley (Paralympic swimmer)
Colleen Hardwick (TEAM for a Livable Vancouver)

Former provincial and territorial politicians

- Darlene Marzari (former MLA for Vancouver-Point Grey, former Vancouver city councillor)

Former municipal politicians

- Marguerite Ford (former Vancouver city councillor)

Other prominent individuals

- Patrick Condon (professor at UBC School of Architecture)
- David Ley (professor emeritus at UBC Department of Geography)
Mark Marissen (Progress Vancouver)

Former members of Parliament

- Jean Chrétien (20th prime minister of Canada)
- Paul Martin (21st prime minister of Canada)

Former provincial and territorial politicians

- Christy Clark (former premier of British Columbia)
