= Forward Together (Vancouver) =

Municipal political party in British Columbia, Canada

- Leader: Kennedy Stewart
- Founded: 2020 (as Team Kennedy Stewart)
- Dissolved: 2024
- Ideology: Social democracy
- Political position: Centre-left
- Colours: Turquoise, orange

Website
- www.forwardvancouver.ca

Forward Together is a former non-profit advocacy organization and municipal political party in Vancouver, British Columbia, Canada. The party was led by then–Vancouver mayor Kennedy Stewart through the 2022 municipal election, which he lost to Ken Sim.

== History ==
=== In government ===
Kennedy Stewart was elected mayor as an independent in the 2018 Vancouver municipal election, presiding over 10 councillors elected from four different parties. Though he pledged to work co-operatively with councillors, ensuing policy disagreements with other parties prompted Stewart to form his own organization in 2020, initially called Team Kennedy Stewart. In April 2022, the party rebranded as "Forward Together with Kennedy Stewart". With Stewart seeking re-election as mayor in the 2022 Vancouver municipal election, Forward Together announced its first three council candidates in June 2022, and another three candidates by September 2022.

=== 2022 election ===
The party aimed to elect a "progressive majority" to city council, which, as elected in 2018, was evenly divided between the centre-right/right-wing Non-Partisan Association (NPA) and the centre-left/left-wing Greens, OneCity, and COPE. Forward Together stated it would run up to six council candidates, leaving room for other centre-left parties to elect their own councillors.

Kennedy Stewart, prior to being elected mayor, served as a member of Parliament and was affiliated with the New Democratic Party, as were council candidates Dulcy Anderson (constituency assistant to BC NDP MLA David Eby), Tesicca Truong and Jeanette Ashe (previously BC NDP candidates). Council candidate Russil Wvong served as riding chair for the Vancouver Kingsway Liberal electoral district association.

Stewart was defeated in his candidacy for re-election on October 15, 2022. None of Forward Together's six candidates for city council were elected. The party did not run any candidates for school board or park board, opting to endorse Vision Vancouver's school and parks candidates. Stewart was endorsed by Vision in the mayoral race.

=== Post-election activities ===
After the 2022 election, the party changed its ballot name to "Forward Together". The party states it is working to advance several priorities ahead of the 2026 municipal election, including affordable housing, democratic reform, and climate change policies.

In the summer of 2024, Forward Together was deregistered as a local elector organization and re-established as an advocacy group seeking to overturn the at-large voting system, particularly in Vancouver and Surrey, British Columbia's two largest cities. As of the 2026, Forward Together is inactive.

== Electoral results ==
Mayoral
Election year	Candidate	Votes	%	Position	Result
2022	Kennedy Stewart	49,593	29.48	▼2nd	Not elected

Vancouver City Council
Election	Seats	+/–	Votes	%	Change	Position
2022	0 / 11	Steady	160,375	11.91	Steady	No seats
