= Bill Tieleman =

Bill Tieleman (born February 18, 1957) is a lobbyist and former NDP political strategist in Vancouver, British Columbia, Canada. He is known for opposing the 2009 referendum on electoral reform, and the 2018 referendum on whether to hold a second vote to choose a proportional voting system. Tieleman is also known for strongly advocating hydraulic fracturing to extract methane for export from British Columbia, and for denying the role of global warming in forest fires. Tieleman supported the Site C dam and opposed the 2017 confidence and supply agreement between the BC Green caucus and BC NDP caucus under leader John Horgan, which gave Horgan a legislative majority to become premier.

== Career ==
Tieleman was a director of communications for the British Columbia Federation of Labour, and communications director in the office of premier Glen Clark. Tieleman owns West Star Communications, a consulting firm that provides "strategy and communication services for labour, business, non-profits and government," according to Tieleman's blog. Tieleman appears as a political commentator on radio and writes a politics column weekly for The Tyee. From 2005 to 2009, he appeared as a guest opposite Norman Spector weekly on CKNW's Bill Good Show. Tieleman also participated in a political panel for about 10 years on CBC Vancouver's Early Edition radio show.

Tieleman was known in the 2000s for his commentary and coverage of the BC Legislature raids. In December 2007, he came back from the courtroom to discover that his office had been broken-into and materials related to the trial moved about. Tieleman regarded this as an attempt at intimidation. In 2008, Tieleman reported receiving death threats after he wrote column calling for a boycott of China.

In April 2021, Tieleman publicly opposed rezoning some of Vancouver to allow more social housing. In June 2022, Tieleman was nominated by the civic party TEAM for a Livable Vancouver to run for city council in the 2022 Vancouver municipal election. He also served as TEAM's campaign manager. Tieleman placed 31st in a field of 59, receiving votes from just over 10% of voters.

== Referendums ==
Tieleman was president of the No STV Campaign Society that successfully prevented the introduction of BC-STV, a form of single transferable voting, in the 2009 referendum on provincial electoral reform. Tieleman played "the leading role on behalf of the No STV camp in the public debates and discussions." The No STV campaign concentrated their media buy in the final two weeks prior to the referendum. Opposition to the measure increased from the first referendum, he felt, because citizens had more information on the practical consequences of STV, including large multi-member ridings.

After the Liberal government of premier Gordon Campbell introduced the new Harmonized Sales Tax (HST), Tieleman started a No HST campaign on Facebook. When Facebook removed the group in January 2010, Tieleman claimed it was the province's largest Facebook group with more than 130,000 members. The group was restored by Facebook without explanation two days later. He also became a strategist and media spokesman for Fight HST, led by Bill Vander Zalm, seeking a referendum to cancel the HST in accordance with the Recall and Initiative Act.

Tieleman sought official recognition (with allies Suzanne Anton and Bob Plecas) to oppose a 2018 referendum on whether to hold a second vote to choose a proportional voting system.

== Personal life ==
Tieleman holds a master's degree in political science from the University of British Columbia and lives in Vancouver. As a student at UBC, Tieleman quit the negotiating team for the teaching assistant union in a dispute over the settling of a labour dispute with the university. Tieleman previously served as a director of the board for the Vancity credit union.
