= ABC Vancouver =

Municipal political party in Canada

- Abbreviation: ABC
- Leader: Ken Sim
- President: Stephen Mólnár
- Chairperson: Marie Rogers
- Founded: April 14, 2021
- Split from: Non-Partisan Association
- Ideology: Centrism; Conservatism; Liberal conservatism; Economic liberalism
- Political position: Centre to centre-right
- Colours: Magenta, blue, gold
- City council: 1 / 11
- Park board: 0 / 7
- School board: 0 / 9

Website
- abcvancouver.ca

ABC Vancouver (fully named A Better City Vancouver Electors Association) is a municipal political party in Vancouver, British Columbia, Canada. It is led by former mayor Ken Sim.

== History ==
=== Formation ===
In the 2022 Vancouver municipal election, three of the five city councillors elected in 2018 for the Non-Partisan Association (NPA) – Rebecca Bligh, Lisa Dominato, and Sarah Kirby-Yung – joined and ran under ABC Vancouver. Ken Sim, the NPA's 2018 mayoral candidate, was acclaimed as ABC's mayoral candidate.

All ABC Vancouver candidates were elected. Sim was elected as mayor with 50.96% of the popular vote, defeating incumbent Kennedy Stewart by 36,139 votes (21.48% of the popular vote).

On December 20, 2023, ABC submitted an amended disclosure statement for the 2022 election, which indicated that their $1.008 million campaign had received over $116,000 in prohibited contributions.

=== In government ===
With the party forming a majority on council, ABC approved several of its key policy planks in the first few council meetings of the 2022–2026 term, including adopting the IHRA definition of antisemitism, green-lighting "urgent measures to uplift Vancouver's Chinatown," and directing city staff to budget $16 million to hire 100 police officers and 100 mental health nurses.

In early 2023, the ABC park board majority voted to remove most of the temporary Stanley Park bike lane in favour of replacing the bike lane with new, permanent cycling infrastructure. The first budget approved by the ABC-led council included increases in funding to the City's road maintenance, horticulture, mental health crisis response, and snow removal budgets, as well as funding increases to the Vancouver Police Department and Vancouver Fire and Rescue Services. The council majority also voted to abandon the city's living wage certification and transition the City's base wage rate on a five-year average rolling living wage.

In May 2023, the ABC council majority voted to make numerous changes to the City's 'Empty Homes Tax,' including additional exemptions and a decision to maintain the tax's rate at 3%. Among the changes was a decision to retroactively exempt standing inventory from the tax, and return to developers $3.8 million that had been collected as empty homes tax for unsold condominium units.

Fulfilling an ABC election promise, the municipal government announced in June 2023 that the city's new Chinatown satellite office would open in July, bearing the name of Won Alexander Cumyow. The office, which will provide local services in Mandarin and Cantonese, will be located in the city-owned Chinatown Plaza mall on Keefer Street. The ABC-led Council also unanimously supported a motion from OneCity's Christine Boyle to support improved municipal services in South Vancouver and Marpole.

On December 6, 2023, three of six ABC Park Commissioners left the party to sit as independents following Sim's announcement of his motion to amend the Vancouver Charter in order to abolish the elected Park Board.

On August 8, 2024, Vancouver School Board chair Victoria Jung announced she was resigning as a member of ABC to sit as an independent trustee. Jung cited the controversy surrounding ABC's attempt to suspend Vancouver's Integrity Commissioner and freeze "any new or ongoing investigations", a move that was widely criticized, including by the B.C. Ombudsperson. It was subsequently revealed that as they were attempting to suspend the Integrity Commissioner, Mayor Sim and his Office were under investigation for a complaint that alleged bullying of an elected official.

On February 14, 2025, the party removed city councillor Rebecca Bligh from caucus, saying that "it has become clear that she is not aligned with the shared priorities and team-oriented approach that defines ABC Vancouver."

=== 2025 council by-election ===
ABC contested both seats in the April 2025 council by-election, nominating Ralph Kaisers and Jaime Stein. Neither was elected, with Stein finishing sixth with 9,267 votes and Kaisers seventh with 8,915 votes. The seats were won by Sean Orr of the Coalition of Progressive Electors (COPE) and Lucy Maloney of OneCity Vancouver.

=== 2026 municipal election ===
In the October 2026 municipal election, ABC lost its council majority and retained only one seat, held by Mike Klassen. Sim was defeated in the mayoral election by Green candidate Pete Fry. None of ABC's candidates for the park board or school board were elected.

Before the election, COPE, OneCity and the Greens agreed to limit each party to a maximum of five council candidates to reduce competition among progressive candidates. The parties also committed to working towards a single progressive mayoral candidate. Following the withdrawals of COPE's Stephanie Allen and OneCity's William Azaroff, Fry was the only remaining mayoral candidate from the three parties.

== Election results ==
=== Mayoral election ===
Election	Candidate	Votes	%	Status	Result
2022	Ken Sim	85,732	50.96	1st	Elected
2026	Ken Sim	67,467	32.7	2nd	Not elected

=== City council ===
Vancouver City Council
Election	Seats	+/–	Votes	%	Change	Status
2022	8 / 11	▲5	465,597	34.58	Steady	Majority
2025	7 / 11	▼1	18,182	13.68	▼20.90	Majority
2026	1 / 11	▼6	466,248	28.21	▲14.53	Opposition
