= TEAM for a Livable Vancouver =

Municipal political party in Canada

- Abbreviation: TEAM
- Leader: Colleen Hardwick
- President: Chris Johnson
- Secretary: Sal Robinson
- Founded: August 24, 2021
- Ideology: Localism; Economic liberalism
- Political position: Centre to centre-right
- City council: 0 / 11
- Park board: 0 / 7
- School board: 0 / 9

Website
- www.voteteam.ca

TEAM for a Livable Vancouver (TEAM) is a municipal political party in Vancouver, British Columbia, Canada. It was established by Vancouver city councillor Colleen Hardwick, first elected in 2018 with the Non-Partisan Association (NPA). It has generally been classified as a moderate and centrist political party prioritizing local communities within the city of Vancouver.

== Founding and the 2022 Vancouver municipal election ==
The party's name comes from former mayor Art Phillips' The Electors' Action Movement (TEAM). The new party held a conference in 2021 to develop policy directions, which were later ratified by the membership. Colleen Hardwick, the daughter of Vancouver City Councillor and academic Walter Hardwick (1968–1974), had publicly considered running for mayor as early as September 2021. She resigned from the Non-Partisan Association (NPA) as one of three members (alongside colleagues Lisa Dominato and Sarah Kirby-Yung) raising allegations about a "backroom deal" regarding future party governance. An elected nine-member Board of Directors was established at an inaugural Annual General Meeting on November 28, 2021.

In anticipation of the 2022 Vancouver municipal election, former Non-Partisan Association city councillor Colleen Hardwick was acclaimed as TEAM's 2022 mayoral candidate in March 2022. At a general meeting on June 11, TEAM members nominated six candidates for city council; of these individuals, Cleta Brown made a previous run for council in 2014 as a Green Party of Vancouver candidate, where she finished 18th; Stephen Roberts ran provincially with the BC Liberals in the Saanich North riding in 2013, 2017, and 2020; and Bill Tieleman was previously a BC NDP lobbyist. Tieleman told The Georgia Straight that TEAM "will make affordable housing, public safety and city services and livability the priority". Shortly thereafter in September, incumbent Vancouver Park Board commissioner Tricia Barker announced her intention to join TEAM as one of its six city park board nominees.

TEAM's platform in the 2022 municipal election included promises to use city-owned land for affordable housing, to increase consultation with neighbourhood residents about development, and to implement vacancy control on rental housing in apartment buildings. It has consistently been critical of mass rezoning plans (specifically the Broadway Plan) and called into question the merits of Vancouver's social housing plans, arguing in 2025 that middle and low-income families are being sidelined by the rezonings, with a press release stating, "TEAM agrees that Vancouver needs social housing, but thinks neighbourhoods should have a say in how that happens. TEAM also agrees with the many planners and experts who say 20-storey high-rises don't belong in low-rise areas, and that many social-housing residents, especially families, do better in lower-rise buildings than towers." It has staunchly opposed the Broadway Plan's original tenets in favor of a more practical and financially responsible approach to low-income housing, arguing that it "will encourage land speculation, increase rent, boost housing prices, and lead to the eviction of thousands of tenants" and thus make Vancouver less livable.

In its fundraising, TEAM made a point of refusing to accept personal election contributions from major corporate property developers. Hardwick also stated that she "encourages voters to explore [candidates' platform] differences carefully before deciding who they think is best suited for the mayor’s office" at several points during her campaign.

Colleen Hardwick placed 3rd in her campaign for mayor, behind Ken Sim (ABC Vancouver) and Kennedy Stewart (Forward Together) and none of TEAM's council, park board or school board candidates were elected.

== Post-election activities and the 2025 Vancouver city council by-election ==
TEAM continued to engage in civic issues following its defeat. One researcher affiliated with the party engaged in a review of various parties' election-campaign filings and identified apparent discrepancies in ABC Vancouver's donations, and Elections BC was notified in July 2023. In July 2024, Colleen Hardwick appeared before Vancouver City Council to oppose ABC's plans to remove or change many of the view cones that protected mountain views. TEAM worked to inform residents about the planned intensification of density in the Broadway Plan area throughout 2024 and 2025, and a rally to "Pause the Plan" was held In November 2024, soon before Vancouver City Council approved amendments removing some earlier limits to highrise towers. Party employee Theodore Abbott told The Globe and Mail that the rally organizers wanted a reorientation of the Broadway Plan so that the voices of residents and community groups are listened to and used as a guide.

The party also criticized the Vancouver City Council's decision to axe Vancouver's annual dragon boat racing for the 2026 calendar year, arguing that "City Hall supports private interests instead of local communities [...] tax dollars should be spent wisely for the benefit of residents - not on boondoggles that cancel popular local events like the Dragon Boat Festival and are too expensive for most people to attend," referring to Vancouver's role in hosting the 2026 FIFA World Cup. TEAM argued that the "tremendous" planned $281 million costs from Vancouver City Council associated with the FIFA World Cup, which included $10 million for temporary surveillance cameras around BC Place, was neither "used for real, lasting investments for residents" nor a permanent solution to the growing concerns over public safety throughout the city.

Colleen Hardwick and Theodore Abbott were acclaimed as the TEAM for a Livable Vancouver nominees during a meeting in February 2025 held in anticipation of the forthcoming 2025 Vancouver City Council by-election on April 5th. With two council seats to fill following the resignation of Christine Boyle (on December 12, 2024) and Adriane Carr (on January 15, 2025), the two TEAM candidates topped the polls in four neighbourhoods: Kerrisdale, Kitsilano, Dunbar and West Point Grey. However, neither Hardwick nor Abbott were able to secure a seat on city council, respectively finishing in 3rd and 5th out of the 13 prospective candidates.

== 2026 Vancouver municipal election ==
TEAM for a Livable Vancouver confirmed in January 2026 its intentions to run candidates for mayor, city council and the park board in the 2026 Vancouver municipal election. In April 2026, TEAM announced that Colleen Hardwick had been chosen as its candidate for mayor and Charles Kelly and Kathleen Larsen (previously a candidate in 2022 for the Vancouver Park Board) were its first nominees for city council. In June, Amanda Boggan and Jonathan Weisman were also named TEAM city council candidates, with the complete slate of candidates set to be selected and announced in July.

In July, TEAM pledged to repeal several citywide and neighbourhood development plans, including the Vancouver Official Development Plan, the Jericho Lands Official Development Plan, the Rupert and Renfrew Station Area Plan, the Vancouver Plan and the Broadway Plan. The party proposed replacing these with neighbourhood-based community planning.

In the October 17 election Hardwick finished third in the mayoral race, behind the Greens' Pete Fry and incumbent mayor Ken Sim. None of TEAM's candidates were elected to city council, the park board or the school board.

== Electoral results ==
Mayoral
Election	Candidate	Votes	%	Position	Result
2022	Colleen Hardwick	16,769	9.97	3rd	Not elected
2026	Colleen Hardwick	18,105	8.78	3rd	Not elected

Vancouver City Council
Election	Seats	+/–	Votes	%	Change (pp)	Position
2022	0 / 11	▼1	104,613	7.77		No seats
2025	0 / 11	Steady	28,933	21.77	▲14.00	No seats
2026	0 / 11	Steady	139,912	8.46	▼13.31	No seats

2022 TEAM for a Livable Vancouver City Council Candidates:

- Cleta Brown — 20,854 Votes — 12.16% — 24th — Not Elected
- Sean Nardi — 18,353 Votes — 10.70% — 28th — Not Elected
- Grace Quan — 17,955 Votes — 10.40% — 29th — Not Elected
- Bill Tieleman — 17,240 Votes — 10.05% — 31st — Not Elected
- Stephen Roberts — 16,261 Votes — 9.48% — 32nd — Not Elected
- Param Nijjar — 13,950 Votes — 8.13% — 35th — Not Elected

2022 TEAM for a Livable Vancouver Park Board Candidates:

- Tricia Barker — 25,615 Votes — 14.94% — 16th — Not Elected
- Kathleen Larsen — 21,418 Votes — 12.49% — 18th — Not Elected
- Kumi Kimura — 19,394 Votes — 11.31% — 19th — Not Elected
- Michelle Mollineaux — 15,943 Votes — 9.30% — 20th — Not Elected
- Patrick Audley — 14,681 Votes — 8.56% — 22nd — Not Elected
- James Buckshon — 13,222 Votes — 7.71% — 24th — Not Elected

2022 TEAM for a Livable Vancouver School Board Candidate:

- Matiul Alam — 20,772 Votes — 12.11% — 21st — Not Elected

Vancouver City Council By-Election
Election	Candidate	Votes	%	Position	Result
2025	Colleen Hardwick	17,352	25.53	3rd	Not elected
2025	Theodore Abbott	11,581	17.04	5th	Not elected
