= OneCity Vancouver =

Municipal political party in Canada

- Co-chairs: Cara Ng; Liz Locke
- Founded: 2014
- Split from: Coalition of Progressive Electors
- Headquarters: Vancouver, British Columbia, Canada
- Membership (2026): 4,700
- Ideology: Social democracy
- Political position: Centre-left
- Colours: Turquoise, indigo
- City council: 1 / 11
- Park board: 0 / 7
- School board: 3 / 9

Website
- onecityvancouver.ca

OneCity Vancouver is a municipal political party in Vancouver, British Columbia, Canada. It was founded in 2014 by independent activists and former members of the left-wing Coalition of Progressive Electors (COPE). OneCity is considered to be an "urbanist" party, as it advocates for the modification of zoning laws to increase Vancouver's housing supply. Christine Boyle was the party's representative on city council for six years; she stepped down in 2024 to win a provincial seat with the BC NDP and in 2025 was named BC's Minister of Housing and Municipal Affairs. OneCity nominated their first mayoral candidate, William Azaroff, to run in the 2026 municipal election, but he later withdrew and endorsed the Greens' Pete Fry. In the election, OneCity retained one council seat and won three school board seats.

== History ==
=== 2014–2025 ===
OneCity first nominated a candidate for office, RJ Aquino, in the 2014 Vancouver municipal election. Aquino placed 22nd.

In the 2017 Vancouver by-election, the party elected its first candidate, Carrie Bercic, who placed eighth in a race for all nine open seats on the Vancouver School Board.

OneCity, together with four other progressive municipal parties (including COPE, Vision Vancouver, and the Green Party), agreed to a deal brokered by the Vancouver & District Labour Council to avoid vote splitting in the 2018 municipal election by limiting each party's number of candidates. In that election, Christine Boyle was elected as the first OneCity member of Vancouver City Council, and Jennifer Reddy was elected to the Vancouver School Board.

Ahead of the 2022 municipal election, OneCity announced the results of its nomination race on March 7, becoming the first municipal party to nominate a slate of candidates for the October 15 election. The party's members re-nominated OneCity councillor Boyle, along with three new candidates for city council: president of the Urban Native Youth Association Matthew Norris, urban planner Iona Bonamis, and health economist Ian Cromwell. The party did not run a candidate for mayor, tacitly supporting incumbent mayor Kennedy Stewart, with whom OneCity had cooperated on municipal legislation.

OneCity fielded three candidates for the Vancouver Park Board: Serena Jackson, Tiyaltelut Kristen Rivers, and Caitlin Stockwell. In addition, OneCity ran five candidates for Vancouver School Board: incumbent Jennifer Reddy, Rory Brown, Kyla Epstein, Krista Sigurdson, and Gavin Somers.

OneCity released its 2022 election platform on September 6 with the campaign slogan "You Belong in Vancouver". The platform committed to addressing the housing crisis with a promise to allow new rental buildings of up to six storeys, including small-scale retail at street level, in all parts of the city. The party also promised to allow new condo developments up to four storeys across the city. Beyond housing, the platform also addressed community safety, harm reduction, Indigenous justice, climate change, arts, economic development, and active transportation.

In the 2022 election, councillor Christine Boyle and school board trustee Jennifer Reddy were re-elected. None of the party's 11 other candidates were successful in their campaigns, but the party increased its vote share by more than 60%. Boyle was left as the sole social democratic councillor after the defeat of mayor Kennedy Stewart and COPE councillor Jean Swanson, but OneCity pledged cooperation with the ABC Vancouver council majority on shared priorities.

In December 2022, after the inauguration of the new council, councillor Boyle re-introduced her motion to remove barriers to non-market housing construction in Vancouver, which was amended and passed with majority support. Councillor Boyle also won ABC's support for her June 2023 motion to provide new municipal resources and services to South Vancouver and Marpole, whose populations are more working class and racialized than the city at large. OneCity supported the city's 2023 property tax increase but cautioned against any cuts to municipal services.

In 2023, OneCity also vocally criticized the ABC council majority's underfunding of the city's Climate Emergency Action Plan, council's in camera vote to eliminate the city's living wage policy, ABC's rejection of a new active transportation lane on Broadway and their removal of the Stanley Park bike lane, ABC's vote to return approximately $3.8 million in empty homes tax revenue to property developers, and ABC's refusal to renew the leases of temporary modular housing sites for which there is no replacement housing available.

On January 28, 2025, OneCity announced Lucy Maloney, a cycling and road safety advocate, as their candidate for the 2025 Vancouver City Council by-election. She won the election in April.

=== 2026 municipal election ===
In February 2026, OneCity members elected William Azaroff, CEO of a non-profit housing developer, as their mayoral candidate for the 2026 Vancouver municipal election. In his acceptance speech, Azaroff declared he would campaign on "pro-growth, pro-housing, pro-worker, practical progressivism".

In April, OneCity, the Coalition of Progressive Electors (COPE) and the Green Party of Vancouver agreed to limit their numbers of candidates to reduce competition among progressive candidates. Each party could nominate up to five council candidates. OneCity could also run five school board candidates and three park board candidates, while COPE and the Greens could each nominate four candidates for each board. The agreement initially allowed separate mayoral candidates but committed the parties to working towards identifying a single progressive contender.

That May, OneCity announced its candidates. Joining incumbent Lucy Maloney on the council slate were transportation planner Iona Bonamis, journalist Frances Bula, co-operative housing advocate Jarrett Hagglund and Indigenous rights lawyer Caitlin Stockwell. Its school board candidates were Krista Sigurdson, Rory Brown, former Vancouver School Board superintendent Steve Cardwell, Christopher Lee and Sherry Breshears. The party nominated former commissioner John Irwin, public servant Dominic Denofrio and labour activist and biologist Tyler Petersen for the park board.

On September 8, Azaroff withdrew from the mayoral race, citing the parties' commitment to unite behind a single progressive challenger to incumbent mayor Ken Sim. His withdrawal followed that of COPE's Stephanie Allen, leaving Pete Fry as the only mayoral candidate from the three parties.

The October 17 election returned Maloney as OneCity's sole successful council candidate. Sigurdson, Brown and Cardwell were elected to the school board, increasing the party's representation from one trustee to three. None of its park board candidates were elected. Fry defeated Sim in the mayoral election.

== Political positions ==
The party's platform deals with social inequality, inclusive communities, improving public schools, addressing the toxic drug crisis, and affordable housing. OneCity supports the introduction of a land value tax to both generate revenue for public housing projects and curb real estate speculation.

A motion introduced by OneCity councillor Christine Boyle saw the City of Vancouver declare a climate emergency on January 16, 2019.

In 2021, Boyle sought to gain council approval of a bicycle lane on Commercial Drive between 14th Avenue and Graveley Street, but her motion was defeated by Green councillors. In June 2022, a motion tabled by Boyle successfully amended the Broadway Plan to require the installation of an AAA bicycle lane along Broadway upon completion of the SkyTrain extension.

On council, Boyle sought to gain approval from Vancouver City Council to allow cooperative and social housing up to 12 storeys in height in select multi-family residential areas in the city after council had unanimously agreed to allowing cooperative and social housing up to six storeys in height in similar areas of the city. However, in January 2022, councillors affiliated with the Greens, Non-Partisan Association, ABC Vancouver, and TEAM for a Livable Vancouver voted against the motion and it was defeated. OneCity stated that votes such as this one have led to greater homelessness and housing unaffordability in Vancouver due to the denial of greater housing supply in the city; critics of the motion based their opposition on the definition of "social housing" used in the motion, as well as the possibility of shadows being generated from taller buildings.

OneCity supported the legalization of alcohol consumption in Vancouver's public parks and beaches without geographic restrictions.

OneCity is considered to be an "urbanist" party in Vancouver's political context, and compared to other municipal parties, it is more ardent in the degree to which it favours the modification of zoning laws to increase the supply of housing in Vancouver, the lack of which has been cited as a contributor to the city's high housing prices. This position has been criticized based on the position that housing affordability is provincial or federal issue rather than a municipal one; OneCity has responded by stating that Vancouver should maximize the use of tools at its own discretion to tackle issues such as climate change, homelessness, and affordability.

== Electoral results ==
COPE election results for mayor of Vancouver, 1972 to present
Election	Candidate	Votes	%	Position	Status
2026	William Azaroff	–	–	–	Withdrew

Vancouver City Council
Election	Leader	Seats	+/–	Votes	%	Change (pp)	Status
2014	RJ Aquino	0 / 11	Steady	30,050	16.54	Steady	No seats
2017	Judy Graves	0 / 11	Steady	6,327	13.17	▼3.37	No seats
2018	Christine Boyle	1 / 11	▲1	45,455	25.76	▲12.59	Crossbench
2022	Christine Boyle	1 / 11	Steady	38,465	22.43	▼3.33	Opposition
2025	Lucy Maloney	1 / 11	Steady	33,732	25.38	▲2.95	Opposition
2026	Lucy Maloney	1 / 11	Steady	266,520	16.12	▼9.26	Crossbench
