= Municipal political parties in Vancouver =

British Columbia is one of three provinces in Canada that officially recognizes political parties at the municipal level, the others being Quebec and Alberta. Vancouver has a uniquely long history of political parties, which have dominated the city's political landscape since the 1930s. Between 1936 and 2002, 42 different political parties or slates contested elections for the mayoralty, council, school or park boards. Most of these parties have been ephemeral and are too obscure to note.

== History ==
Timeline of Vancouver's municipal parties since 1930.

Vancouver's first municipal election in 1886 saw the Knights of Labour run a slate of candidates for office. Labour and community groups continued to offer endorsements to candidates throughout the city's early political history. Full-fledged party politics emerged in 1936 with the entry of the Co-operative Commonwealth Federation (CCF) into the municipal arena. This perceived threat from the left prompted the city's business community to coalesce around the Non-Partisan Association (NPA) the following year in 1937.

The NPA shifted from anti-communism towards the centre-right and became the most successful party in Vancouver's history. The NPA dominated city politics from the 1930s until the early 2020s. Of the 19 mayors elected since the NPA's formation, 12 have come from the party. The NPA ran largely unopposed until 1968, which saw the formation of TEAM to the centre as a localist alternative to development interests, and of the democratic socialist Committee of Progressive Electors to the left.

TEAM came to hold power for much of the 1970s and elected their first mayor, Art Phillips, in 1973. A splinter faction of TEAM around Mike Harcourt, later formalized as the Civic Independents, took the mayoralty and some seats on council in the early 1980s. Nonetheless, the city politics of the 1980s and 1990s would come to be defined by a virtual two-party system between the NPA and COPE. Gordon Campbell revitalized the NPA after Harcourt's mayoralty and presided over NPA dominance for the latter half of the 1980s. His successor, Philip Owen, took the party further to the centre, especially on drug policy. Owen led the NPA to an unprecedented electoral victory in 1996 when the party won the mayoralty, all 10 council seats, and the entirety of the school and park boards.

After decades in opposition, COPE dramatically won the mayoralty and majorities on council and the park and school boards in the 2002 election under Larry Campbell. However, before Campbell's term was completed, his moderate faction (dubbed "COPE Light") split to form the green liberal Vision Vancouver, which dominated city politics for a further 10 years until the 2018 election. Events since then have seen further political realignments in Vancouver, with the demise of NPA in place of ABC Vancouver in 2022, and a multi-party left-wing backlash to ABC's Ken Sim in the 2026 election.

== Parties with elected members ==
Name	Founded	Ideology	Alignment	Leader(s)	Mayoralty	City council	Park board	School board
ABC Vancouver	2021	Conservatism	Centre to centre-right	Ken Sim	No	1 / 11	0 / 7	0 / 9
Green Party of Vancouver	1984	Green politics	Green politics	Pete Fry	Yes	5 / 11	3 / 7	2 / 9
Coalition of Progressive Electors	1968	Democratic socialism	Left-wing	Sam Smart; Nate Stanley	No	4 / 11	4 / 7	4 / 9
OneCity Vancouver	2014	Social democracy	Centre-left	Cara Ng; Liz Locke	No	1 / 11	0 / 7	2 / 9

== Other registered parties ==
Name	Founded	Ideology	Alignment	Leader
Affordable Housing Coalition	2022	Pro-housing development	Moderate	Eric Redmond
Bright Future Vancouver	2026	Reformism	Centrist	Muhammad Ahmad
Conservative Electors Association	2025	Conservatism	Centre-right to right-wing	David Denhoff
Non-Partisan Association	1937	Conservatism	Centre-right to right-wing	Fred Harding
TEAM for a Livable Vancouver	2021	Localism; Fiscal conservatism	Centre	Colleen Hardwick
TrueBlue Vancouver	2026	Conservatism; Law and order	Right-wing	Frederick Thiele
Vancouver Liberal Electors Association	2025	Liberalism	Centre	Kareem Allam
Vote Vancouver	2025	Social Liberalism	Centre	Rebecca Bligh

== Defunct parties ==
Name	Founded	Abolished	Ideology	Alignment	Final leader
Civic Voter's Association	1957	1961	Conservatism	Centre to centre-right	Betsy McDonald
Civic Action Association	1964	1966	[[[Localism (politics)|Localism]]	Centre to centre-right	Reginald Atherton
The Electors' Action Movement (TEAM)	1968	1986	Reformism; Green politics; Participatory democracy	Centre to centre-left	Art Phillips
Civic Independents	1984	1986	Reformism; [[[Localism (politics)|Localism]]	Centre-left	Mike Harcourt
Vancouver 1st	2013	2018	Libertarian conservatism	Right-wing	Fred Harding
Coalition Vancouver	2018	2018	Conservatism; Fiscal conservatism; Populism	Centre-right to right-wing	Wai Young
Neighbourhoods for a Sustainable Vancouver	2007	2021	Sustainable development	Centre	Steering committee
Progress Vancouver (Note: Known as Yes Vancouver from 2018 to 2021.)	2018	2023	Fiscal conservatism; Social progressivism; Pro-housing development	Centre to centre-right	Mark Marissen
Vision Vancouver	2005	2024	Green liberalism	Centre to centre-left	Aaron Leung; Janet Wiegand
Forward Together	2022	2024	Social democracy	Centre-left	Kennedy Stewart
VOTE Socialist	2022	2026	Socialism; Left-wing populism	Left-wing	Collective leadership
