= Christine Boyle =

Canadian politician

Christine Boyle MLA
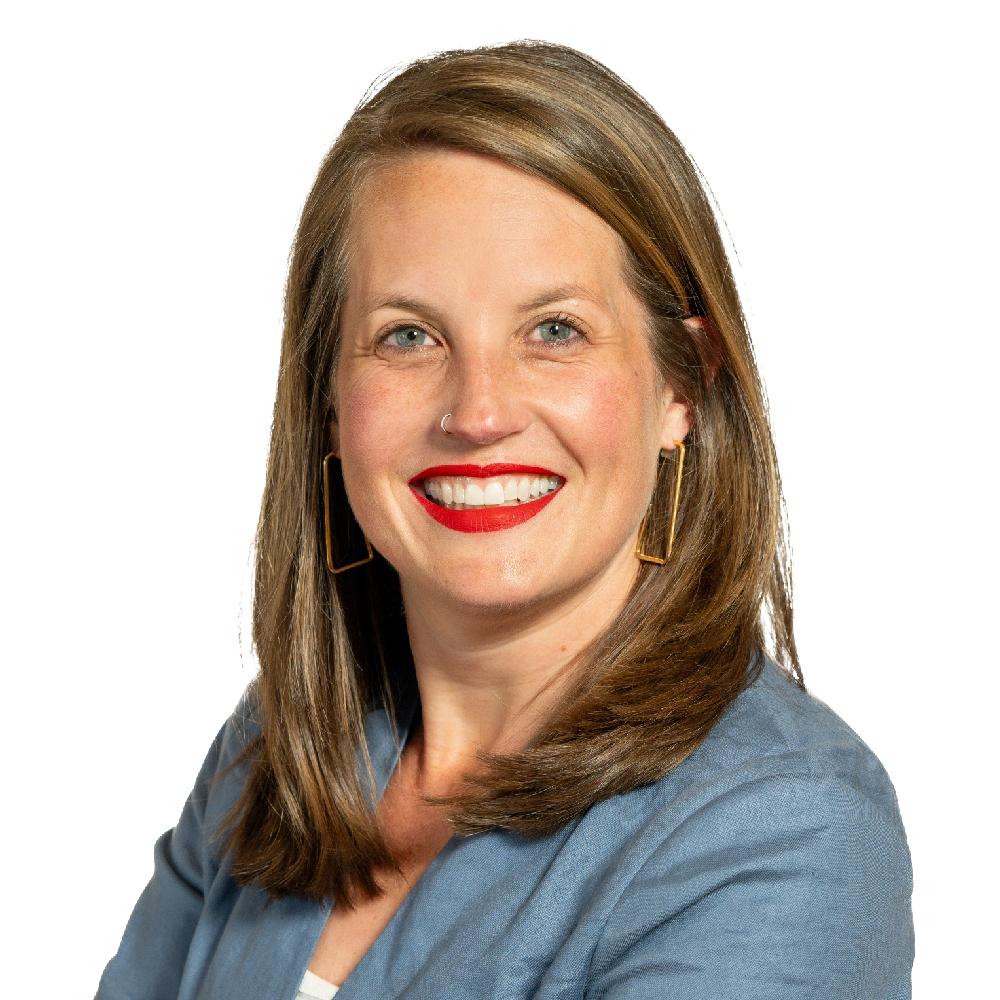
- Campaign portrait, 2024

Minister of Housing and Municipal Affairs of British Columbia
- In office July 17, 2025 – November 20, 2026
- Premier: David Eby
- Preceded by: Ravi Kahlon

Minister of Indigenous Relations and Reconciliation of British Columbia
- In office November 18, 2024 – July 17, 2025
- Premier: David Eby
- Preceded by: Murray Rankin
- Succeeded by: Spencer Chandra Herbert

Member of the British Columbia Legislative Assembly for Vancouver-Little Mountain
- Incumbent
- Assumed office October 19, 2024
- Preceded by: George Heyman (Vancouver-Fairview)

Vancouver City Councillor
- In office November 5, 2018 – December 12, 2024

Personal details
- Party: New Democratic
- Other political affiliations: OneCity Vancouver
- Domestic partner: Seth Klein
- Children: 2

Christine Boyle is a Canadian politician and activist who has served as a member of the Legislative Assembly of British Columbia (MLA), representing the riding of Vancouver-Little Mountain since 2024. A member of the New Democratic Party, she served in its Cabinet as the minister of Housing, and Municipal Affairs since July 2025 and previously as minister of Indigenous Relations and Reconciliation.

Boyle previously served as a Vancouver city councillor from 2018 until her resignation in 2024.

== Activism ==
Boyle has been active in climate justice work and is an ordained minister in the United Church. She has been involved in community-based initiatives including the Self Care Project and Spirited Social Change, organizations focused on supporting activists and encouraging social engagement. She has also participated in Fossil Free Faith, a group that advocates for fossil fuel divestment within faith communities; the United Church of Canada voted to divest in 2015.

In 2015, Boyle attended events at the Vatican related to Laudato Si, and later that year was a delegate to the COP21 climate talks representing the United Church of Canada. In 2018, she took part in faith-based demonstrations concerning the Trans Mountain pipeline in Burnaby, British Columbia.

== Political career ==
Boyle has said she was motivated to run for office by concerns about inequality in Vancouver, housing affordability, and community engagement. She ran alongside Brandon Yan after securing the OneCity Vancouver nomination in June 2018. In the 2018 municipal election, she won a seat on Vancouver City Council, becoming the first OneCity councillor and one of eight women elected to the ten-member council. She was re-elected to a second term in the 2022 municipal election.

On April 4, 2024, Boyle was nominated as the New Democratic Party candidate for Vancouver-Little Mountain in the 2024 provincial election. She was elected in that race, defeating Conservative candidate John Coupar.

== Personal life ==
Boyle lives with her partner, writer and activist Seth Klein, and their children in Grandview–Woodlands.

== Electoral record ==
=== Provincial elections ===
2026 British Columbia general election: Vancouver-Little Mountain
Party	Candidate	Votes	%	±%	Expenditures
New Democratic	Christine Boyle	11,638	49.21		
Conservative	Alex Muir	7,945	33.59		
Green	Sarah MacLeod	4,013	16.97		
Total valid votes		23,596	99.77		
Total rejected ballots		55	0.23		
Turnout		23,651			
Registered voters					
New Democratic hold		Swing		−8.33	
Source: Elections BC

2024 British Columbia general election: Vancouver-Little Mountain
Party	Candidate	Votes	%	±%	Expenditures
New Democratic	Christine Boyle	15,636	62.11	+11.2	
Conservative	John Coupar	7,704	30.60	+30.4	
Green	Wendy Hayko	1,833	7.28	−7.4	
Total valid votes		25,173	—		
Total rejected ballots		61			
Turnout		25,234	61.16		
Registered voters		41,259			
New Democratic hold		Swing			
Source: Elections BC

=== Municipal elections ===
2022 Vancouver municipal election: Vancouver City Council
Party	Candidate	Votes	%	Elected
ABC Vancouver	Sarah Kirby-Yung (X)	72,545	42.30	✓
ABC Vancouver	Lisa Dominato (X)	70,415	41.05	✓
ABC Vancouver	Brian Montague	68,618	40.01	✓
ABC Vancouver	Mike Klassen	65,586	38.24	✓
ABC Vancouver	Peter Meiszner	63,275	36.90	✓
ABC Vancouver	Rebecca Bligh (X)	62,765	36.60	✓
ABC Vancouver	Lenny Zhou	62,393	36.39	✓
Green	Adriane Carr (X)	41,831	24.39	✓
OneCity	Christine Boyle (X)	38,465	22.43	✓
Green	Pete Fry (X)	37,270	21.73	✓
Forward Together	Dulcy Anderson	33,985	19.82	
OneCity	Iona Bonamis	33,745	19.68	
Forward Together	Tesicca Truong	32,900	19.18	
COPE	Jean Swanson (X)	32,833	19.15	
Green	Michael Wiebe (X)	30,377	17.71	
OneCity	Ian Cromwell	29,833	17.40	
OneCity	Matthew Norris	29,663	17.30	
Forward Together	Alvin Singh	29,049	16.94	
NPA	Melissa De Genova (X)	26,578	15.50	
COPE	Breen Ouellette	24,881	14.51	
Forward Together	Jeanette Ashe	22,432	13.08	
Forward Together	Russil Wvong	22,107	12.89	
Green	Devyani Singh	21,255	12.39	
TEAM	Cleta Brown	20,854	12.16	
Green	Stephanie Smith	20,408	11.90	
Forward Together	Hilary Brown	19,902	11.61	
COPE	Nancy Trigueros	19,152	11.17	
TEAM	Sean Nardi	18,353	10.70	
TEAM	Grace Quan	17,955	10.47	
COPE	Tanya Webking	17,675	10.31	
TEAM	Bill Tieleman	17,240	10.05	
TEAM	Stephen Roberts	16,261	9.48	
Vision	Stuart Mackinnon	15,865	9.25	
NPA	Morning Lee	14,083	8.21	
TEAM	Param Nijjar	13,950	8.13	
VOTE Socialist	Sean Orr	13,744	8.01	
Progress Vancouver	Asha Hayer	13,107	7.64	
NPA	Ken Charko	12,083	7.47	
Vision	Lesli Boldt	11,070	6.46	
NPA	Elaine Allan	10,917	6.37	
Affordable Housing Coalition	Eric Redmond	10,617	6.19	
NPA	Arezo Zarrabian	10,361	6.04	
Progress Vancouver	Marie Noelle Rosa	10,111	5.90	
Progress Vancouver	Morgane Oger	10,015	5.84	
Progress Vancouver	David Chin	9,354	5.45	
Progress Vancouver	May He	8,593	5.01	
NPA	Cinnamon Bhayani	8,586	5.01	
Independent	Lina Vargas	7,714	4.50	
Vision	Honieh Barzegari	6,831	3.98	
Progress Vancouver	Mauro Francis	6,556	3.82	
Independent	Mark Bowen	5,706	3.33	
Independent	Dominic Denofrio	4,927	2.87	
Independent	Amy "Evil Genius" Fox	3,711	2.16	
Independent	Jeremy MacKenzie	3,446	2.01	
Independent	Kyra Philbert	3,382	1.97	
Independent	Tim Lý	3,339	1.95	
Independent	Marlo Franson	2,866	1.67	
Independent	Amie Peacock	2,745	1.60	
Independent	K. R. Alm	2,301	1.34	
"(X)" indicates incumbent city councillor. Percentage of votes shown is percentage of voters who voted, not votes cast.
Source: City of Vancouver

2018 Vancouver municipal election: City Council
Party	Candidate	Votes	%	Elected
Green	(I) Adriane Carr	69,739	39.52	✓
Green	Pete Fry	61,806	35.03	✓
NPA	(I) Melissa De Genova	53,251	30.18	✓
COPE	Jean Swanson	48,865	27.69	✓
NPA	Colleen Hardwick	47,747	27.06	✓
Green	(O) Michael Wiebe	45,593	25.84	✓
OneCity	Christine Boyle	45,455	25.76	✓
NPA	(O) Lisa Dominato	44,689	25.33	✓
NPA	Rebecca Bligh	44,053	24.97	✓
NPA	(O) Sarah Kirby-Yung	43,581	24.70	✓
NPA	David Grewal	41,913	23.75	
Green	David H. Wong	40,887	23.17	
Vision	(I) Heather Deal	39,529	22.40	
COPE	Derrick O'Keefe	38,305	21.71	
NPA	Justin P. Goodrich	37,917	21.49	
COPE	Anne Roberts	36,531	20.70	
OneCity	Brandon O. Yan	36,167	20.50	
NPA	Jojo Quimpo	34,601	19.61	
Independent	Sarah Blyth	29,456	16.69	
Vision	Tanya Paz	28,836	16.34	
Vision	Diego Cardona	27,325	15.49	
Vision	(O) Catherine Evans	25,124	14.24	
Independent	(O) Erin Shum	23,331	13.22	
Vancouver 1st	Ken Low	21,908	12.42	
Independent	Adrian Crook	17,392	9.86	
Vision	Wei Q. Zhang	16,734	9.48	
Coalition Vancouver	Ken Charko	16,366	9.28	
Coalition Vancouver	James Lin	16,191	9.18	
Independent	Wade Grant	15,422	8.74	
Independent	Taqdir K. Bhandal	15,326	8.69	
Vancouver 1st	Elizabeth Taylor	15,184	8.61	
Coalition Vancouver	Penny Mussio	14,886	8.44	
Yes Vancouver	Brinder Bains	13,948	7.90	
Yes Vancouver	Stephanie Ostler	13,530	7.67	
Coalition Vancouver	Jason Xie	13,424	7.61	
Yes Vancouver	Glynnis C. Chan	13,218	7.49	
Coalition Vancouver	Glen Chernen	13,148	7.45	
Coalition Vancouver	Morning Li	12,614	7.15	
Vancouver 1st	Nycki K. Basra	12,133	6.88	
Yes Vancouver	Jaspreet Virdi	12,124	6.87	
Coalition Vancouver	Franco Peta	11,193	6.34	
Yes Vancouver	Phyllis Tang	11,902	6.75	
Independent	Rob McDowell	11,828	6.70	
Independent	Penny Noble	11,435	6.48	
Independent	Graham Cook	11,084	6.28	
Vancouver 1st	Michelle C. Mollineaux	8,819	5.00	
ProVancouver	Raza Mirza	8,783	4.98	
Vancouver 1st	Jesse Johl	8,609	4.88	
Independent	Barbara Buchanan	8,180	4.64	
ProVancouver	Breton Crellin	7,856	4.45	
Vancouver 1st	Elishia Perosa	7,489	4.24	
Independent	Anastasia Koutalianos	7,469	4.23	
Independent	Abubakar Khan	7,239	4.10	
Vancouver 1st	John Malusa	6,597	3.74	
Independent	Lisa Kristiansen	6,506	3.69	
ProVancouver	Rohana D. Rezel	6,336	3.59	
Independent	Françoise Raunet	5,891	3.34	
Independent	Hamdy El-Rayes	5,381	3.05	
Independent	Hsin-Chen Fu	5,007	2.84	
Independent	Justin Caudwell	4,488	2.54	
Independent	Harry Miedzygorski	4,308	2.44	
Independent	Gordon T. Kennedy	4,297	2.44	
Independent	Ashley Hughes	3,965	2.25	
Independent	Kelly Alm	3,440	1.95	
Independent	Marlo Franson	3,316	1.88	
Independent	John Spark	3,287	1.86	
Independent	Katherine Ramdeen	3,082	1.75	
Independent	Spike Peachey	2,863	1.62	
Independent	Larry J. Falls	2,768	1.57	
Independent	Elke Porter	2,515	1.43	
Independent	Ted Copeland	1,946	1.10	
'(I)' denotes incumbent city councillors. '(O)' denotes incumbents of other municipal positions.
