= Jean Swanson =

Canadian politician, activist, and writer

Jean Swanson CM
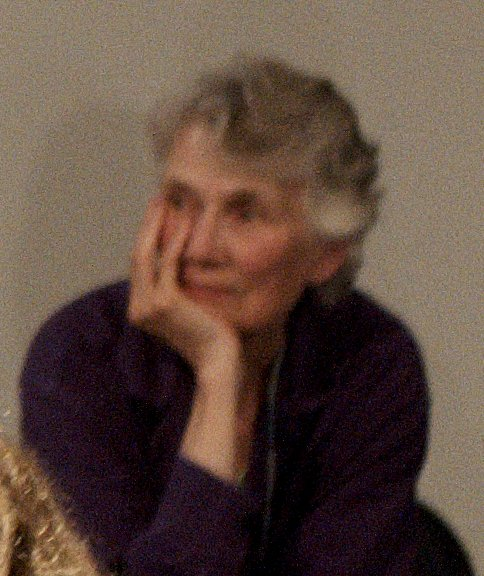
- Swanson in 2012

Vancouver City Councillor
- In office November 5, 2018 – November 7, 2022

Personal details
- Born: 1942 or 1943 (age 83–84)
- Party: COPE
- Occupation: Activist; writer
- Awards: Order of Canada

Jean Swanson CM (born 1942 or 1943) is a Canadian politician, anti-poverty activist, and writer in Vancouver, British Columbia. She represented the left-wing Coalition of Progressive Electors on Vancouver City Council as one of Vancouver's 10 at-large city councillors from 2018 to 2022.

== Activism ==
In the 1980s, Swanson worked with the BC Solidarity Coalition, as well as Vancouver's Downtown Eastside Residents Association (DERA).

Swanson is the coordinator of the Carnegie Housing Project, and formerly coordinator of the Carnegie Community Action Project (CCAP), an organization dedicated to the welfare of the Downtown Eastside, one of Canada's poorest neighbourhoods. Swanson also founded and works with the group End Legislated Poverty, a British Columbia coalition with stated aims to "educate and organize in order to make governments reduce and end poverty". She was national chair of the National Anti-Poverty Organization (NAPO). She authored Poor Bashing: The Politics of Exclusion. She also authored The Soul of Vancouver: Voices from the Downtown Eastside (2019).

=== Vancouver City Council ===
During Swanson's time on Vancouver City Council, she consistently voted for social housing while opposing market-rate housing developments.

In 2017, during her campaign for Vancouver City Council, she called for a rent freeze. She said that she would not support the construction of market-rate housing, as she believed it would cause gentrification and increase rents. In 2019, she voted against allowing a 5-storey apartment building (where one-fifth of the units were below market rates) in Kitsilano, a 35-storey building in Woodland, and 79 rental units in the Hastings-Sunrise neighbourhood, arguing they would gentrify the neighbourhood and displace residents. That year, she also voted against allowing the conversion of a single-family lot into 21 townhomes, arguing that the rents would be too high and that only the landlord would benefit.

In 2022, she voted against a 39-storey building (with one-fifth of the units set aside for below market rate rents), arguing that the building would lead to increases in rents in nearby buildings.

In 2021, she voted in favour of allowing 12-storey apartment buildings of social housing without a rezoning application.

In 2022, she voted against a major rezoning plan for the Broadway corridor that permitted 40-storey mixed-use developments near SkyTrain stations, as well as the replacement of older, small 10-unit buildings with 15- to 20-storey buildings. She argued that this was not the "housing we need for the working class". During the debates on rezoning, she asked "If people are driving into Vancouver for jobs, wouldn't it be better to increase the jobs elsewhere outside of Vancouver so people don't have to drive so far?"

== Awards and recognition ==
In 2016, she was inducted into the Order of Canada, Canada's highest civilian honour, with the grade of member. Swanson was also the recipient of the 2007 Carleton University Kroeger College Award for Citizenship and Community Affairs, an award recognizing "creativity, persistence, and overall leadership in demonstrating the value of a locally based initiative." Swanson was chosen for the award "for her tireless work against poverty in Canada. (She) is a private individual living in Vancouver who the jury concluded best represented the qualities of commitment, leadership, and community ties."

In 2021, she was the subject of Teresa Alfeld's short documentary film Jean Swanson: We Need a New Map.

== Electoral record ==
2018 Vancouver municipal election: City Council
Party	Candidate	Votes	%	Elected
Green	(I) Adriane Carr	69,739	39.52	✓
Green	Pete Fry	61,806	35.03	✓
NPA	(I) Melissa De Genova	53,251	30.18	✓
COPE	Jean Swanson	48,865	27.69	✓
NPA	Colleen Hardwick	47,747	27.06	✓
Green	(O) Michael Wiebe	45,593	25.84	✓
OneCity	Christine Boyle	45,455	25.76	✓
NPA	(O) Lisa Dominato	44,689	25.33	✓
NPA	Rebecca Bligh	44,053	24.97	✓
NPA	(O) Sarah Kirby-Yung	43,581	24.70	✓
NPA	David Grewal	41,913	23.75	
Green	David H. Wong	40,887	23.17	
Vision	(I) Heather Deal	39,529	22.40	
COPE	Derrick O'Keefe	38,305	21.71	
NPA	Justin P. Goodrich	37,917	21.49	
COPE	Anne Roberts	36,531	20.70	
OneCity	Brandon O. Yan	36,167	20.50	
NPA	Jojo Quimpo	34,601	19.61	
Independent	Sarah Blyth	29,456	16.69	
Vision	Tanya Paz	28,836	16.34	
Vision	Diego Cardona	27,325	15.49	
Vision	(O) Catherine Evans	25,124	14.24	
Independent	(O) Erin Shum	23,331	13.22	
Vancouver 1st	Ken Low	21,908	12.42	
Independent	Adrian Crook	17,392	9.86	
Vision	Wei Q. Zhang	16,734	9.48	
Coalition Vancouver	Ken Charko	16,366	9.28	
Coalition Vancouver	James Lin	16,191	9.18	
Independent	Wade Grant	15,422	8.74	
Independent	Taqdir K. Bhandal	15,326	8.69	
Vancouver 1st	Elizabeth Taylor	15,184	8.61	
Coalition Vancouver	Penny Mussio	14,886	8.44	
Yes Vancouver	Brinder Bains	13,948	7.90	
Yes Vancouver	Stephanie Ostler	13,530	7.67	
Coalition Vancouver	Jason Xie	13,424	7.61	
Yes Vancouver	Glynnis C. Chan	13,218	7.49	
Coalition Vancouver	Glen Chernen	13,148	7.45	
Coalition Vancouver	Morning Li	12,614	7.15	
Vancouver 1st	Nycki K. Basra	12,133	6.88	
Yes Vancouver	Jaspreet Virdi	12,124	6.87	
Coalition Vancouver	Franco Peta	11,193	6.34	
Yes Vancouver	Phyllis Tang	11,902	6.75	
Independent	Rob McDowell	11,828	6.70	
Independent	Penny Noble	11,435	6.48	
Independent	Graham Cook	11,084	6.28	
Vancouver 1st	Michelle C. Mollineaux	8,819	5.00	
ProVancouver	Raza Mirza	8,783	4.98	
Vancouver 1st	Jesse Johl	8,609	4.88	
Independent	Barbara Buchanan	8,180	4.64	
ProVancouver	Breton Crellin	7,856	4.45	
Vancouver 1st	Elishia Perosa	7,489	4.24	
Independent	Anastasia Koutalianos	7,469	4.23	
Independent	Abubakar Khan	7,239	4.10	
Vancouver 1st	John Malusa	6,597	3.74	
Independent	Lisa Kristiansen	6,506	3.69	
ProVancouver	Rohana D. Rezel	6,336	3.59	
Independent	Françoise Raunet	5,891	3.34	
Independent	Hamdy El-Rayes	5,381	3.05	
Independent	Hsin-Chen Fu	5,007	2.84	
Independent	Justin Caudwell	4,488	2.54	
Independent	Harry Miedzygorski	4,308	2.44	
Independent	Gordon T. Kennedy	4,297	2.44	
Independent	Ashley Hughes	3,965	2.25	
Independent	Kelly Alm	3,440	1.95	
Independent	Marlo Franson	3,316	1.88	
Independent	John Spark	3,287	1.86	
Independent	Katherine Ramdeen	3,082	1.75	
Independent	Spike Peachey	2,863	1.62	
Independent	Larry J. Falls	2,768	1.57	
Independent	Elke Porter	2,515	1.43	
Independent	Ted Copeland	1,946	1.10	
'(I)' denotes incumbent city councillors. '(O)' denotes incumbents of other municipal positions.

Vancouver municipal by-election, October 14, 2017: City Council Resignation of Geoff Meggs
Party	Candidate	Votes	%	Elected
NPA	Hector Bremner	13,372	27.83	✓
COPE	Jean Swanson	10,263	21.36	
Green	Pete Fry	9759	20.31	
OneCity	Judy Graves	6327	13.17	
Vision	Diego Cardona	5411	11.26	
Sensible Vancouver	Mary Jean Dunsdon	1737	3.62	
Independent	Gary Lee	886	1.84	
Independent	Damian J. Murphy	157	0.33	
Independent	Joshua Wasilenkoff	131	0.27	
NPA gain from Vision		Swing		–

1988 Vancouver mayoral election	Vote	%
Gordon Campbell (NPA)	75,545	62.58
Jean Swanson (COPE / NDP)	45,178	37.42
