= Pete Fry =

Mayor of Vancouver

His Worship Pete Fry
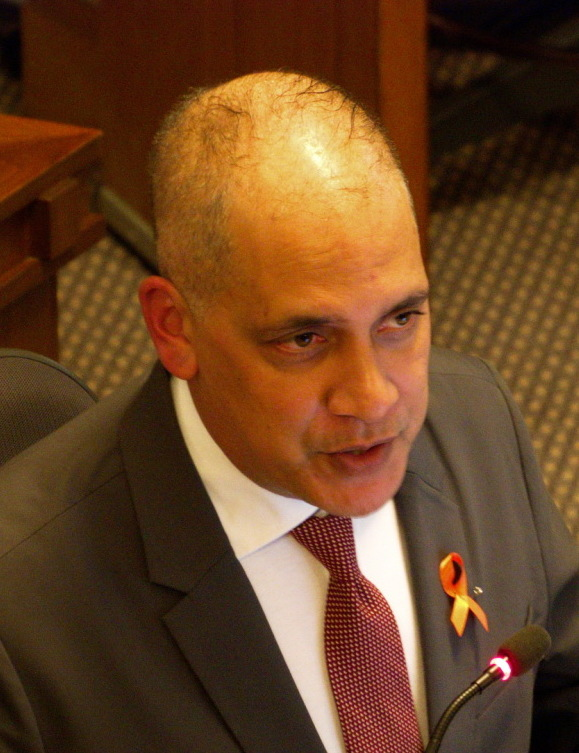
- Fry in 2018

42nd Mayor of Vancouver
- Incumbent
- Assumed office November 2, 2026
- Preceded by: Ken Sim

Vancouver City Councillor
- In office November 5, 2018 – November 2, 2026

Personal details
- Born: 1969 (age 56–57) Dublin, Ireland
- Party: Green Party of Vancouver
- Other political affiliations: BC Greens
- Parent: Hedy Fry (mother)

Pete Fry (born 1969) is a Canadian politician who has served as the mayor of Vancouver since 2026. A member of the Green Party of Vancouver, he served as a Vancouver city councillor from 2018 to 2026.

== Early life and career ==
Fry was born in Dublin, Ireland to a British father and a Trinidadian mother, Hedy Fry, the long-time federal Liberal member of Parliament (MP) for Vancouver Centre. Through his mother, Fry is Indian with partial Chinese, Scottish and Spanish heritage. Fry immigrated with his family to Vancouver at the age of one.

Owner of a graphic design and communications agency in Vancouver, Fry became involved in community activism, serving as community representative for the City of Vancouver's Downtown Eastside Local Area Plan, as well as chair of the Strathcona Residents’ Association.

== Political career ==
A prominent member of the Green Party of Vancouver, Fry first ran for the Vancouver City Council in the 2014 municipal election, but was not elected.

In 2016, Fry secured the nomination of the Green Party of British Columbia in a provincial by-election in the riding of Vancouver-Mount Pleasant, where he lost to British Columbia New Democratic Party candidate Melanie Mark. In 2017, he ran for the Vancouver City Council a second time, in the by-election following the resignation of Geoff Meggs; he lost to Non-Partisan Association candidate Hector Bremner. At the 2018 city council election, Fry received the second-highest number of votes and was elected as a councillor. He was reelected as a city councillor in the 2022 Vancouver municipal election.

=== Mayor of Vancouver (2026-present) ===
Fry announced his campaign for mayor on January 30, 2026, under the Green Party of Vancouver banner. During the campaign, he secured the support from OneCity Vancouver and the Coalition of Progressive Electors, two left-wing parties that withdrew their mayoral candidates in favour of Fry. His political platform emphasized addressing public stress in Vancouver related to the cost of living, housing, mental health, and public safety by focusing on community-centred services, alongside environmentally responsible urban planning solutions, with an open, transparent approach to local government, aiming to restore public trust in local government. A primary focus of his 2026 mayoral campaign was streamlining permits for building new low-rise apartments, townhomes, and row homes, favouring wooden-frame and infill construction with locally sourced lumber, as well as retrofitting existing buildings to reduce their carbon footprint. Additionally, Fry is a proponent of harm reduction in community services, supporting the interests of small and local businesses, and bolstering the art and culture scenes in Vancouver.

On October 17, 2026, he was elected mayor of Vancouver, defeating incumbent Ken Sim. He won with 47.76% of the vote in the municipal election, becoming the city's first Green Party mayor. He took office on November 2, 2026, along with four Green Party city councillors, three Park Board members, and two School Board trustees.

== Electoral record ==
2026 Vancouver municipal election: Mayor
Party	Candidate	Votes	%	Elected
Green	Pete Fry	98,494	47.78	✓
ABC Vancouver	Ken Sim (incumbent)	67,467	32.73	
TEAM	Colleen Hardwick	18,105	8.78	
Liberal	Kareem Allam	10,580	5.13	
Vote Vancouver	Rebecca Bligh	8,681	4.21	
Bright Future	Muhammad Ahmad	1,352	0.66	
Independent	Scott Gilbert	1,135	0.55	
Independent	Amauri Caliman	347	0.17	
Source: CBC

2022 Vancouver municipal election: Vancouver City Council
Party	Candidate	Votes	%	Elected
ABC Vancouver	Sarah Kirby-Yung (X)	72,545	42.30	✓
ABC Vancouver	Lisa Dominato (X)	70,415	41.05	✓
ABC Vancouver	Brian Montague	68,618	40.01	✓
ABC Vancouver	Mike Klassen	65,586	38.24	✓
ABC Vancouver	Peter Meiszner	63,275	36.90	✓
ABC Vancouver	Rebecca Bligh (X)	62,765	36.60	✓
ABC Vancouver	Lenny Zhou	62,393	36.39	✓
Green	Adriane Carr (X)	41,831	24.39	✓
OneCity	Christine Boyle (X)	38,465	22.43	✓
Green	Pete Fry (X)	37,270	21.73	✓
Forward Together	Dulcy Anderson	33,985	19.82	
OneCity	Iona Bonamis	33,745	19.68	
Forward Together	Tesicca Truong	32,900	19.18	
COPE	Jean Swanson (X)	32,833	19.15	
Green	Michael Wiebe (X)	30,377	17.71	
OneCity	Ian Cromwell	29,833	17.40	
OneCity	Matthew Norris	29,663	17.30	
Forward Together	Alvin Singh	29,049	16.94	
NPA	Melissa De Genova (X)	26,578	15.50	
COPE	Breen Ouellette	24,881	14.51	
Forward Together	Jeanette Ashe	22,432	13.08	
Forward Together	Russil Wvong	22,107	12.89	
Green	Devyani Singh	21,255	12.39	
TEAM	Cleta Brown	20,854	12.16	
Green	Stephanie Smith	20,408	11.90	
Forward Together	Hilary Brown	19,902	11.61	
COPE	Nancy Trigueros	19,152	11.17	
TEAM	Sean Nardi	18,353	10.70	
TEAM	Grace Quan	17,955	10.47	
COPE	Tanya Webking	17,675	10.31	
TEAM	Bill Tieleman	17,240	10.05	
TEAM	Stephen Roberts	16,261	9.48	
Vision	Stuart Mackinnon	15,865	9.25	
NPA	Morning Lee	14,083	8.21	
TEAM	Param Nijjar	13,950	8.13	
VOTE Socialist	Sean Orr	13,744	8.01	
Progress Vancouver	Asha Hayer	13,107	7.64	
NPA	Ken Charko	12,083	7.47	
Vision	Lesli Boldt	11,070	6.46	
NPA	Elaine Allan	10,917	6.37	
Affordable Housing Coalition	Eric Redmond	10,617	6.19	
NPA	Arezo Zarrabian	10,361	6.04	
Progress Vancouver	Marie Noelle Rosa	10,111	5.90	
Progress Vancouver	Morgane Oger	10,015	5.84	
Progress Vancouver	David Chin	9,354	5.45	
Progress Vancouver	May He	8,593	5.01	
NPA	Cinnamon Bhayani	8,586	5.01	
Independent	Lina Vargas	7,714	4.50	
Vision	Honieh Barzegari	6,831	3.98	
Progress Vancouver	Mauro Francis	6,556	3.82	
Independent	Mark Bowen	5,706	3.33	
Independent	Dominic Denofrio	4,927	2.87	
Independent	Amy "Evil Genius" Fox	3,711	2.16	
Independent	Jeremy MacKenzie	3,446	2.01	
Independent	Kyra Philbert	3,382	1.97	
Independent	Tim Lý	3,339	1.95	
Independent	Marlo Franson	2,866	1.67	
Independent	Amie Peacock	2,745	1.60	
Independent	K. R. Alm	2,301	1.34	
"(X)" indicates incumbent city councillor. Percentage of votes shown is percentage of voters who voted, not votes cast.
Source: City of Vancouver

2018 Vancouver municipal election: City Council
Party	Candidate	Votes	%	Elected
Green	(I) Adriane Carr	69,739	39.52	✓
Green	Pete Fry	61,806	35.03	✓
NPA	(I) Melissa De Genova	53,251	30.18	✓
COPE	Jean Swanson	48,865	27.69	✓
NPA	Colleen Hardwick	47,747	27.06	✓
Green	(O) Michael Wiebe	45,593	25.84	✓
OneCity	Christine Boyle	45,455	25.76	✓
NPA	(O) Lisa Dominato	44,689	25.33	✓
NPA	Rebecca Bligh	44,053	24.97	✓
NPA	(O) Sarah Kirby-Yung	43,581	24.70	✓
NPA	David Grewal	41,913	23.75	
Green	David H. Wong	40,887	23.17	
Vision	(I) Heather Deal	39,529	22.40	
COPE	Derrick O'Keefe	38,305	21.71	
NPA	Justin P. Goodrich	37,917	21.49	
COPE	Anne Roberts	36,531	20.70	
OneCity	Brandon O. Yan	36,167	20.50	
NPA	Jojo Quimpo	34,601	19.61	
Independent	Sarah Blyth	29,456	16.69	
Vision	Tanya Paz	28,836	16.34	
Vision	Diego Cardona	27,325	15.49	
Vision	(O) Catherine Evans	25,124	14.24	
Independent	(O) Erin Shum	23,331	13.22	
Vancouver 1st	Ken Low	21,908	12.42	
Independent	Adrian Crook	17,392	9.86	
Vision	Wei Q. Zhang	16,734	9.48	
Coalition Vancouver	Ken Charko	16,366	9.28	
Coalition Vancouver	James Lin	16,191	9.18	
Independent	Wade Grant	15,422	8.74	
Independent	Taqdir K. Bhandal	15,326	8.69	
Vancouver 1st	Elizabeth Taylor	15,184	8.61	
Coalition Vancouver	Penny Mussio	14,886	8.44	
Yes Vancouver	Brinder Bains	13,948	7.90	
Yes Vancouver	Stephanie Ostler	13,530	7.67	
Coalition Vancouver	Jason Xie	13,424	7.61	
Yes Vancouver	Glynnis C. Chan	13,218	7.49	
Coalition Vancouver	Glen Chernen	13,148	7.45	
Coalition Vancouver	Morning Li	12,614	7.15	
Vancouver 1st	Nycki K. Basra	12,133	6.88	
Yes Vancouver	Jaspreet Virdi	12,124	6.87	
Coalition Vancouver	Franco Peta	11,193	6.34	
Yes Vancouver	Phyllis Tang	11,902	6.75	
Independent	Rob McDowell	11,828	6.70	
Independent	Penny Noble	11,435	6.48	
Independent	Graham Cook	11,084	6.28	
Vancouver 1st	Michelle C. Mollineaux	8,819	5.00	
ProVancouver	Raza Mirza	8,783	4.98	
Vancouver 1st	Jesse Johl	8,609	4.88	
Independent	Barbara Buchanan	8,180	4.64	
ProVancouver	Breton Crellin	7,856	4.45	
Vancouver 1st	Elishia Perosa	7,489	4.24	
Independent	Anastasia Koutalianos	7,469	4.23	
Independent	Abubakar Khan	7,239	4.10	
Vancouver 1st	John Malusa	6,597	3.74	
Independent	Lisa Kristiansen	6,506	3.69	
ProVancouver	Rohana D. Rezel	6,336	3.59	
Independent	Françoise Raunet	5,891	3.34	
Independent	Hamdy El-Rayes	5,381	3.05	
Independent	Hsin-Chen Fu	5,007	2.84	
Independent	Justin Caudwell	4,488	2.54	
Independent	Harry Miedzygorski	4,308	2.44	
Independent	Gordon T. Kennedy	4,297	2.44	
Independent	Ashley Hughes	3,965	2.25	
Independent	Kelly Alm	3,440	1.95	
Independent	Marlo Franson	3,316	1.88	
Independent	John Spark	3,287	1.86	
Independent	Katherine Ramdeen	3,082	1.75	
Independent	Spike Peachey	2,863	1.62	
Independent	Larry J. Falls	2,768	1.57	
Independent	Elke Porter	2,515	1.43	
Independent	Ted Copeland	1,946	1.10	
'(I)' denotes incumbent city councillors. '(O)' denotes incumbents of other municipal positions.

Vancouver municipal by-election, October 14, 2017: City Council Resignation of Geoff Meggs
Party	Candidate	Votes	%	Elected
NPA	Hector Bremner	13,372	27.83	✓
COPE	Jean Swanson	10,263	21.36	
Green	Pete Fry	9759	20.31	
OneCity	Judy Graves	6327	13.17	
Vision	Diego Cardona	5411	11.26	
Sensible Vancouver	Mary Jean Dunsdon	1737	3.62	
Independent	Gary Lee	886	1.84	
Independent	Damian J. Murphy	157	0.33	
Independent	Joshua Wasilenkoff	131	0.27	
NPA gain from Vision		Swing		–

British Columbia provincial by-election, February 2, 2016: Vancouver-Mount Pleasant Resignation of Jenny Kwan
Party	Candidate	Votes	%	±%	Expenditures
New Democratic	Melanie Mark	5,627	60.14	−5.69	$71,603
Green	Pete Fry	2,533	27.07	+15.16	$29,065
Liberal	Gavin Dew	1,056	11.29	−7.46	$66,547
Libertarian	Bonnie Boya Hu	79	0.84	–	$250
Your Political Party	Jeremy Gustafson	61	0.65	–	$454
Total valid votes		9,356	99.53	–	
Total rejected ballots		44	0.47	−0.51	
Turnout		9,400	23.17	−26.60	
Registered voters		40,561			
New Democratic hold		Swing		−10.42	

2014 Vancouver municipal election: Vancouver City Council
Party	Candidate	Votes	Elected
Green	Adriane Carr	74,077	✓
NPA	George Affleck	68,419	✓
NPA	Elizabeth Ball	67,195	✓
NPA	Melissa De Genova	63,134	✓
Vision	Heather Deal	62,698	✓
Vision	Kerry Jang	62,595	✓
Vision	Andrea Reimer	62,316	✓
Vision	Raymond Louie	61,903	✓
Vision	Tim Stevenson	57,640	✓
Vision	Geoff Meggs	56,831	✓
NPA	Ian Robertson	56,319	
NPA	Gregory Baker	55,721	
NPA	Suzanne Scott	55,486	
NPA	Ken Low	54,971	
NPA	Rob McDowell	53,596	
Vision	Tony Tang	49,414	
Vision	Niki Sharma	48,987	
Green	Cleta Brown	47,564	
Green	Pete Fry	46,522	
