= Colleen Hardwick =

Canadian politician and business owner (born 1958)

- Hardwick in 2025

Vancouver City Councilor
- In office November 5, 2018 – November 7, 2022

Personal details
- Born: September 17, 1958 (age 68) Vancouver, British Columbia, Canada
- Party: TEAM for a Livable Vancouver (2021–present)
- Other political affiliations: Non-Partisan Association (2005–2021); Independent (2021)

Colleen Hardwick (born September 17, 1958) is a Canadian politician, media executive and producer in Vancouver, British Columbia, who served on Vancouver City Council from 2018 to 2022. Hardwick is the daughter of former Vancouver alderman Walter Hardwick and the granddaughter of former Vancouver park commissioner Iris Hardwick.

== Early career ==
Hardwick starter her career in production in the TV and movie industry. She eventually founded a Vancouver-based production company called New City Productions.

Hardwick developed MovieSet Inc., a platform to monetize movies under production. The company raised Series A venture capital, but ceased operations in 2011 following the financial crisis.

In 2010, she founded PlaceSpeak, a location-based civic engagement platform designed to consult with people within specific geographic boundaries. PlaceSpeak received B Corporation certification in 2021.

== Political career ==
Hardwick announced her candidacy for Vancouver City Council in the summer of 2005. She campaigned with the Non-Partisan Association (NPA) against a proposal to use assets from Vancouver's Property Endowment fund to build housing that would not yield a return on the investment, claiming her Vision Vancouver opponents "don't even understand how market housing works." Hardwick was endorsed by Vancouver Sun’s editorial board ahead of the November election. With ten councillors to be elected, she placed thirteenth.

In 2018, again running under the NPA banner, Hardwick came fifth and was elected to the council. On a council with no party majority, she frequently questioned some of the initiatives and policies brought forth, and regularly voiced concerns about what she calls "scope-creep" where the municipal government dedicates resources to issues traditionally in the realm of other levels of government.

Hardwick was elected as a member of the NPA but resigned from that organization in April 2021 to sit as an independent councillor. Five months later, Hardwick announced her affiliation with a new civic party, TEAM for a Livable Vancouver, and on March 13, 2022 was acclaimed as TEAM's mayoral candidate for the 2022 municipal election. Hardwick came in third in the mayoral race with 9.97% of the vote.

While on council, Hardwick sought the establishment of an independent auditor general for Vancouver.

=== Stances on housing and upzoning ===
Hardwick opposes upzoning to increase land inflation. She has argued that upzonings and greater density have greatly exacerbated Vancouver's housing affordability crisis, and that increasing revenue through boosted housing supply is akin to a Ponzi scheme.

In 2019, Hardwick voted against allowing construction of a 5-storey apartment building in Kitsilano, citing concerns raised by the neighbors of the proposed building.

In 2020, Hardwick launched a public consultation initiative involving meetings in Vancouver neighbourhoods about accommodating growth. The project could not be completed due to the COVID-19 pandemic.

In 2022, she voted against a major rezoning plan for the Broadway corridor that permitted 40 storey mixed-use developments near SkyTrain stations, as well as the replacement of older, small 10-unit buildings with 15-20 storey buildings. She argued the added housing supply would lead to increased house prices. During her 2022 election campaign, she campaigned on spending $500 million toward building co-op housing and on creating neighbourhood-specific zoning plans.

In 2023, Hardwick opposed proposals to allow for denser housing developments (such as sixplexes) in Vancouver as unnecessary, saying that "Vancouver already has the possibility for more housing under existing policies," under which almost every lot in the city is already eligible to have a main house, a basement suite and a laneway house on it.

In 2022, as a city councillor during a re-zoning hearing for a 12-tower housing project by MST Development Corporation (a partnership of the Musqueam Indian Band, Squamish Nation and Tsleil-Waututh Nation) on land owned by it and Canada Lands Company (a federal crown corporation), Hardwick asked the question "How do you reconcile Indigenous ways of being with 18-storey high-rises?" Hardwick voted in favour of the re-zoning, commenting, "It is moving forward in the exact right direction that reconciliation was intended to be."

== Electoral record ==
2026 Vancouver municipal election: Mayor
Party	Candidate	Votes	%	Elected
Green	Pete Fry	98,494	47.78	✓
ABC Vancouver	Ken Sim (incumbent)	67,467	32.73	
TEAM	Colleen Hardwick	18,105	8.78	
Liberal	Kareem Allam	10,580	5.13	
Vote Vancouver	Rebecca Bligh	8,681	4.21	
Bright Future	Muhammad Ahmad	1,352	0.66	
Independent	Scott Gilbert	1,135	0.55	
Independent	Amauri Caliman	347	0.17	
Source: CBC

Vancouver municipal by-election, April 5, 2025: Vancouver City Council Resignation of Christine Boyle and Adriane Carr
Party	Candidate	Votes	%	Elected
COPE	Sean Orr	34,448	50.69	✓
OneCity	Lucy Maloney	33,732	49.63	✓
TEAM	Colleen Hardwick	17,352	25.53	
Green	Annette Reilly	15,045	22.14	
TEAM	Theodore Abbott	11,581	17.04	
ABC Vancouver	Jaime Stein	9,267	13.64	
ABC Vancouver	Ralph Kaisers	8,915	13.12	
Independent	Jeanifer Decena	652	0.96	
Independent	Guy Dubé	459	0.68	
Independent	Karin Litzcke	433	0.64	
Independent	Rollergirl	404	0.59	
Independent	Charles Ling	352	0.52	
Independent	Gerry McGuire	276	0.41	
Total number of voters		67,962	100.00	
Rejected ballots		0	0.00	
Turnout		67,962	15.09	
Eligible voters		450,503	–	
Percentage of votes shown is percentage of voters who voted, not votes cast.
Source: City of Vancouver

2022 Vancouver municipal election: Mayor
Party	Candidate	Votes	%	Elected
ABC Vancouver	Ken Sim	85,732	50.96	✓
Forward Together	Kennedy Stewart (incumbent)	49,593	29.48	
TEAM	Colleen Hardwick	16,769	9.97	
Progress Vancouver	Mark Marissen	5,830	3.47	
NPA	Fred Harding	3,905	2.32	
Independent	Leona Brown	1,519	0.9	
Independent	Ping Chan	1,154	0.69	
Independent	Françoise Raunet	1,116	0.66	
Independent	Satwant Shottha	994	0.59	
Independent	Imtiaz Popat	411	0.24	
Independent	Lewis Villegas	363	0.22	
Independent	Mike Hansen	314	0.19	
Independent	Gölök Buday	195	0.12	
Independent	Ryan Charmley	183	0.11	
Independent	Dante Teti	142	0.08	
ABC Vancouver gain from Forward Together		Swing		+11.02 (Note: Calculated using Ken Sim's and Kennedy Stewart's 2018 results.)
Source: City of Vancouver

2018 Vancouver municipal election: City Council
Party	Candidate	Votes	%	Elected
Green	(I) Adriane Carr	69,739	39.52	✓
Green	Pete Fry	61,806	35.03	✓
NPA	(I) Melissa De Genova	53,251	30.18	✓
COPE	Jean Swanson	48,865	27.69	✓
NPA	Colleen Hardwick	47,747	27.06	✓
Green	(O) Michael Wiebe	45,593	25.84	✓
OneCity	Christine Boyle	45,455	25.76	✓
NPA	(O) Lisa Dominato	44,689	25.33	✓
NPA	Rebecca Bligh	44,053	24.97	✓
NPA	(O) Sarah Kirby-Yung	43,581	24.70	✓
NPA	David Grewal	41,913	23.75	
Green	David H. Wong	40,887	23.17	
Vision	(I) Heather Deal	39,529	22.40	
COPE	Derrick O'Keefe	38,305	21.71	
NPA	Justin P. Goodrich	37,917	21.49	
COPE	Anne Roberts	36,531	20.70	
OneCity	Brandon O. Yan	36,167	20.50	
NPA	Jojo Quimpo	34,601	19.61	
Independent	Sarah Blyth	29,456	16.69	
Vision	Tanya Paz	28,836	16.34	
Vision	Diego Cardona	27,325	15.49	
Vision	(O) Catherine Evans	25,124	14.24	
Independent	(O) Erin Shum	23,331	13.22	
Vancouver 1st	Ken Low	21,908	12.42	
Independent	Adrian Crook	17,392	9.86	
Vision	Wei Q. Zhang	16,734	9.48	
Coalition Vancouver	Ken Charko	16,366	9.28	
Coalition Vancouver	James Lin	16,191	9.18	
Independent	Wade Grant	15,422	8.74	
Independent	Taqdir K. Bhandal	15,326	8.69	
Vancouver 1st	Elizabeth Taylor	15,184	8.61	
Coalition Vancouver	Penny Mussio	14,886	8.44	
Yes Vancouver	Brinder Bains	13,948	7.90	
Yes Vancouver	Stephanie Ostler	13,530	7.67	
Coalition Vancouver	Jason Xie	13,424	7.61	
Yes Vancouver	Glynnis C. Chan	13,218	7.49	
Coalition Vancouver	Glen Chernen	13,148	7.45	
Coalition Vancouver	Morning Li	12,614	7.15	
Vancouver 1st	Nycki K. Basra	12,133	6.88	
Yes Vancouver	Jaspreet Virdi	12,124	6.87	
Coalition Vancouver	Franco Peta	11,193	6.34	
Yes Vancouver	Phyllis Tang	11,902	6.75	
Independent	Rob McDowell	11,828	6.70	
Independent	Penny Noble	11,435	6.48	
Independent	Graham Cook	11,084	6.28	
Vancouver 1st	Michelle C. Mollineaux	8,819	5.00	
ProVancouver	Raza Mirza	8,783	4.98	
Vancouver 1st	Jesse Johl	8,609	4.88	
Independent	Barbara Buchanan	8,180	4.64	
ProVancouver	Breton Crellin	7,856	4.45	
Vancouver 1st	Elishia Perosa	7,489	4.24	
Independent	Anastasia Koutalianos	7,469	4.23	
Independent	Abubakar Khan	7,239	4.10	
Vancouver 1st	John Malusa	6,597	3.74	
Independent	Lisa Kristiansen	6,506	3.69	
ProVancouver	Rohana D. Rezel	6,336	3.59	
Independent	Françoise Raunet	5,891	3.34	
Independent	Hamdy El-Rayes	5,381	3.05	
Independent	Hsin-Chen Fu	5,007	2.84	
Independent	Justin Caudwell	4,488	2.54	
Independent	Harry Miedzygorski	4,308	2.44	
Independent	Gordon T. Kennedy	4,297	2.44	
Independent	Ashley Hughes	3,965	2.25	
Independent	Kelly Alm	3,440	1.95	
Independent	Marlo Franson	3,316	1.88	
Independent	John Spark	3,287	1.86	
Independent	Katherine Ramdeen	3,082	1.75	
Independent	Spike Peachey	2,863	1.62	
Independent	Larry J. Falls	2,768	1.57	
Independent	Elke Porter	2,515	1.43	
Independent	Ted Copeland	1,946	1.10	
'(I)' denotes incumbent city councillors. '(O)' denotes incumbents of other municipal positions.

2005 Vancouver Municipal Election: City Council
Candidate	Party	Votes	%
Suzanne Anton	NPA	60586	
Peter Ladner*	NPA	58142	
Raymond Louie*	Vision	52795	
Kim Capri	NPA	52719	
Tim Stevenson*	Vision	51527	
David Cadman*	COPE	51155	
George Chow	Vision	51107	
Elizabeth Ball	NPA	50865	
Heather Deal	Vision	50624	
BC Lee	NPA	50047	
Ronald Leung	NPA	48430	
Fred Bass*	COPE	48248	
Colleen Hardwick Nystedt	NPA	46737	
Valerie Jenkinson	NPA	46077	
Heather Harrison	Vision	45719	
Kathi Thompson	NPA	45314	
Tim Louis*	COPE	43349	
Ellen Woodsworth*	COPE	42724	
Anne Roberts*	COPE	41739	
Patrick Maliha	NPA	39165	
Ann Livingston	Green	27168	
Kevin Potvin	Independent	10806	
Michelle Jasmine Chang	Independent	9016	
Jamie Lee Hamilton	Independent	8153	
Patrick Britten	Nude Garden	6595	
Lea Johnson	Independent	6253	
Beverley Ballantyne	Independent	6153	
John W. Angus	Independent	5728	
Wendythirteen	Independent	4247	
John Patrick Gordon	Independent	3887	
Phyllis Loke	Independent	3562	
Marc Boyer	Independent	3388	
Greg Aulin	Independent	3335	
Don Briere	Independent	3125	
David Wilson Applegath	Independent	2718	
Steve Wansleeben	Independent	2478	
Total		1083681	100.0

== Personal life ==
Hardwick has been married to her husband Garry Chalk since September 2013.
