= Mark Marissen =

Canadian political strategist

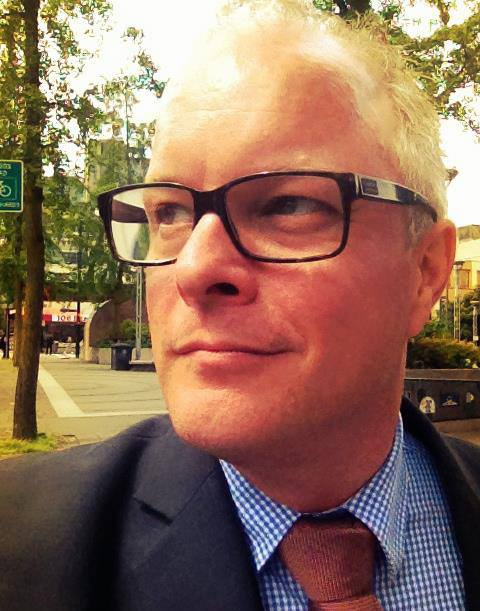
- Marissen in 2013
- Born: Mark Allan Marissen; July 26, 1966 (age 60); St. Thomas, Ontario, Canada
- Education: Carleton University; Simon Fraser University
- Political party: Liberal (federal)
- Other political affiliations: BC Liberal (provincial); Progress Vancouver (2018–2023)
- Spouse: Christy Clark (m. 1996; div. 2009)
- Children: 1

Mark Allan Marissen (born July 26, 1966 in St. Thomas, Ontario, Canada) is a Canadian political strategist and principal of Burrard Strategy Inc., a communications company he founded in 1998. Marissen was also a senior advisor to McMillan Vantage Policy Group, affiliated with McMillan LLP, a Canadian business law firm.

Marissen graduated from Carleton University with a bachelor's degree in political science, and also attended Simon Fraser University. Marissen resides in Vancouver, British Columbia, and has one child (Hamish Marissen-Clark) by his ex-wife, the 35th British Columbia Premier Christy Clark. Marissen's older brother is professor of music Michael Marissen.

== Politics ==
While studying political science at Carleton University, Marissen became involved in local and national Liberal Party campaigns. During a period studying at Simon Fraser University, he volunteered for Jean Chrétien's campaign for the leadership of the Liberal Party of Canada, which Chrétien won in 1990.. Marissen then became National Youth Director of the Liberal Party of Canada. He subsequently served as a senior adviser to David Anderson, a federal cabinet minister and senior political minister for British Columbia.

Marissen moved to British Columbia in 1996, the year his then-spouse, Christy Clark, was elected to the Legislative Assembly of British Columbia for Port Moody–Burnaby Mountain.

During the early 2000s, Marissen managed Paul Martin's successful federal Liberal leadership campaign in British Columbia. He subsequently served as the Liberal Party's British Columbia campaign co-chair in the 2004 and 2006 federal elections. British Columbia was the only province in which the Liberals increased their seat count in both elections, winning five seats in 2000, eight in 2004 and nine in 2006. Nationally, the party's seat count declined from 172 to 135 and then to 103 over the same three elections.

During the investigation associated with the British Columbia Legislature raids in December 2003, RCMP investigators visited Marissen at his home and requested documents. His home was not searched under a warrant, and he was not charged. A 2007 profile in BCBusiness reported that no allegations of wrongdoing had been made against Marissen.

In 2006, Marissen served as national campaign director for Stéphane Dion's successful bid for the leadership of the Liberal Party of Canada. Dion was initially considered an underdog against leading candidates Michael Ignatieff and Bob Rae. Before the leadership convention, Marissen predicted that Dion could win if he advanced to third place on the opening ballot, positioning him to attract support from delegates whose preferred candidates were eliminated.

A 2007 profile in BCBusiness described how Marissen directed a campaign that avoided criticizing rival candidates and maintained relationships with organizers and delegates from competing factions. The strategy was intended to position Dion as an acceptable second choice in a party divided by the earlier leadership rivalry between supporters of Jean Chrétien and Paul Martin. Dion won the leadership on the fourth ballot at the December 2006 convention in Montreal.

Following Dion's victory, Marissen was appointed national campaign co-chair alongside Nancy Girard. Senator David Smith, who had supported Ignatieff during the leadership contest, subsequently joined them as a third co-chair. Marissen continued as national campaign co-chair during the 2008 Canadian federal election.

Following Stephane Dion's resignation, Marissen supported Michael Ignatieff for Liberal Party leader. Ignatieff was confirmed as Leader at a national convention in Vancouver in late April 2009.

In provincial politics, Marissen was involved in Christy Clark's successful campaign for the leadership of the British Columbia Liberal Party in 2011. He also worked in Clark's campaign war-room during the 2013 British Columbia general election, in which the BC Liberals were re-elected.

In the 2013 federal Liberal leadership contest, Marissen was campaign manager for George Takach for Liberal Party leader. After Takach withdrew from the contest, Marissen joined him in supporting Justin Trudeau.

Marissen was involved in Hector Bremner's successful campaign for Vancouver City Council in the 2017 municipal by-election, when Bremner was elected as a candidate of the Non-Partisan Association. Marissen subsequently managed Bremner's mayoral campaign in the 2018 Vancouver municipal election under the banner of Yes Vancouver.

Marissen helped establish Yes Vancouver in 2018. The party advocated changes to Vancouver's zoning regulations to permit greater residential density and was subsequently renamed Progress Vancouver. In September 2022, The Tyee described the organization as likely the first municipal political party in British Columbia to explicitly embrace YIMBY ("Yes In My Backyard") principles.

In 2017-2018, Marissen also served as strategist for Michael Lee's campaign for the leadership of the BC Liberal Party, where Lee was 30 points short from being on the final ballot.

In the 2022 Vancouver municipal election, Marissen was the mayoral candidate for Progress Vancouver, finishing fourth with 3.47% of the vote. In July 2023, Elections BC deregistered Progress Vancouver over deficiencies in its campaign financing disclosures. Under the Local Elections Campaign Financing Act, the party's endorsed candidates were disqualified from running in local elections until after the 2026 general local elections. Elections BC concluded its subsequent investigation in June 2025, imposing administrative monetary penalties on Progress Vancouver and two of its financial agents. The published enforcement decisions did not impose monetary penalties on Marissen or the party's other candidates personally. Elections BC informed Progress Vancouver's financial agent that “the investigation did not identify any evidence that would suggest that Progress Vancouver had deliberately attempted to circumvent the legislation.”

== Business career ==
Marissen founded a Vancouver-based communications and public affairs consultancy in 1998. A 2007 profile in BCBusiness described his consulting and lobbying practice, then operating as Burrard Communications Inc., and reported that its clients had included the Greater Vancouver Transportation Authority (TransLink), the Vancouver International Airport Authority, and BC Ferries..

In 2014, Marissen co-founded and became executive vice-president of communications at Pacific Future Energy Corporation, a Vancouver-based company proposing a $10-billion oil refinery on British Columbia's northern coast. The proposed refinery would process Alberta oil sands bitumen into refined petroleum products for export to Asian markets. The company stated that it intended to develop the project in partnership with British Columbia First Nations. Other people involved in Pacific Future Energy included former International Trade Minister Stockwell Day and former National Chief of the Assembly of First Nations Shawn Atleo. Former National Chief Ovide Mercredi and Dave Coles, former President of the Canadian Communications, Energy and Paperworkers union (CEP), were also involved in the project.

In June 2014, Premier Christy Clark, Marissen's former spouse, announced that she would recuse herself from provincial government discussions and decisions concerning the refinery proposal. Clark said she had consulted British Columbia's conflict-of-interest commissioner and was taking the step to avoid any actual or perceived conflict of interest.

Marissen is also a co-founder and strategic adviser to Kanata Clean Power & Climate Technologies Corp., a Canadian energy development company pursuing projects involving natural gas, hydrogen and electricity generation. Kanata's official website identifies Marissen as a co-founder and strategic adviser. In March 2025, CBC News identified Marissen as a spokesperson for Kanata while reporting that the company's proposed blue-hydrogen export project in northwestern British Columbia had been paused because of infrastructure and transportation challenges.

In June 2026, Kanata and South Korean shipbuilding company Hanwha Ocean signed a non-binding memorandum of understanding concerning a proposed floating liquefied natural gas (LNG) export facility near Prince Rupert, British Columbia. The proposed project, known as Kanata LNG, was designed for an annual export capacity of up to 12 million tonnes of LNG. In September 2026, the companies announced that they had agreed on indicative terms for a potential strategic partnership, with further engineering studies and commercial agreements still required.

== Electoral record ==
2022 Vancouver municipal election: Mayor
Party	Candidate	Votes	%	Elected
ABC Vancouver	Ken Sim	85,732	50.96	✓
Forward Together	Kennedy Stewart (incumbent)	49,593	29.48	
TEAM	Colleen Hardwick	16,769	9.97	
Progress Vancouver	Mark Marissen	5,830	3.47	
NPA	Fred Harding	3,905	2.32	
Independent	Leona Brown	1,519	0.9	
Independent	Ping Chan	1,154	0.69	
Independent	Françoise Raunet	1,116	0.66	
Independent	Satwant Shottha	994	0.59	
Independent	Imtiaz Popat	411	0.24	
Independent	Lewis Villegas	363	0.22	
Independent	Mike Hansen	314	0.19	
Independent	Gölök Buday	195	0.12	
Independent	Ryan Charmley	183	0.11	
Independent	Dante Teti	142	0.08	
ABC Vancouver gain from Forward Together		Swing		+11.02 (Note: Calculated using Ken Sim's and Kennedy Stewart's 2018 results.)
Source: City of Vancouver
