= Wai Young =

Canadian politician

- 楊蕭慧儀
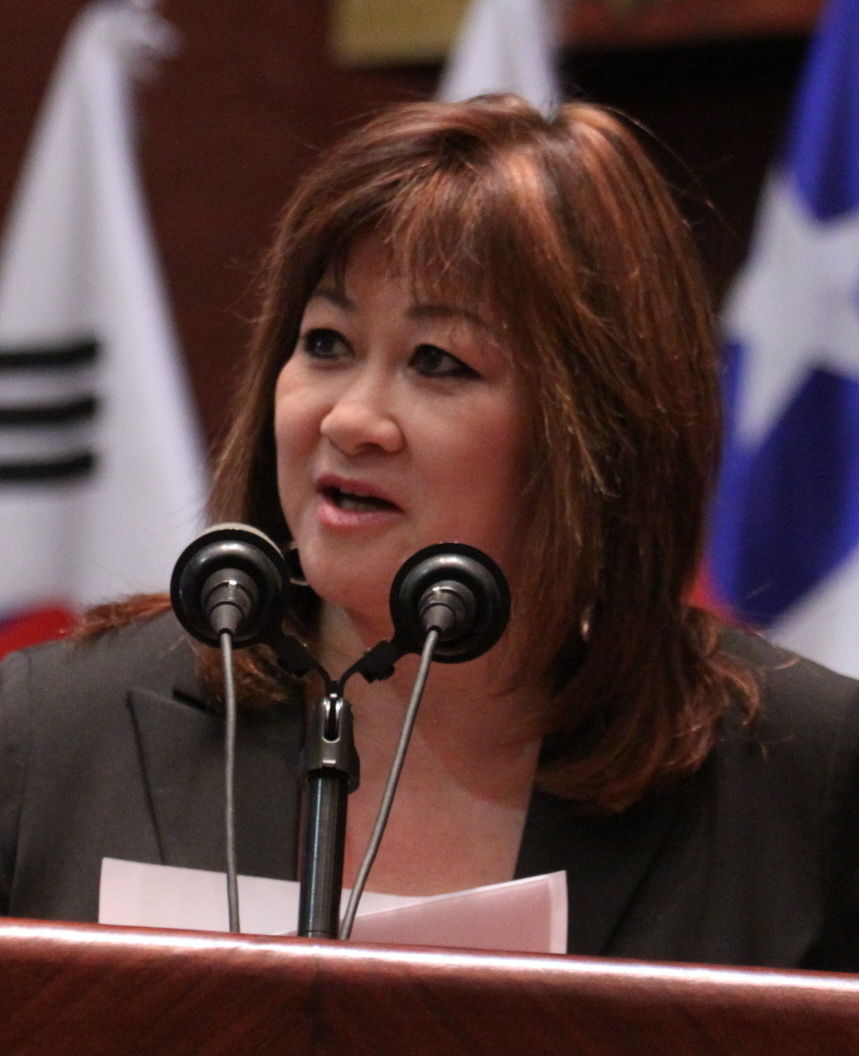

Member of Parliament for Vancouver South
- In office May 30, 2011 – August 4, 2015
- Preceded by: Ujjal Dosanjh
- Succeeded by: Harjit Sajjan

Personal details
- Born: Siu Wai-yee; May 20, 1960 (age 66) Hong Kong
- Party: Conservative (federal); Coalition Vancouver (municipal)
- Education: University of British Columbia
- Occupation: Policy consultant; small business owner
- Website: votewaiyoung.ca

Wai Yee Young (Note: Chinese: 楊蕭慧儀; Jyutping: Joeng^{4} Siu^{1} Wai^{6} Ji^{4}) (née Siu; born May 20, 1960) is a Canadian politician from Vancouver, British Columbia. She was elected to the House of Commons of Canada in the 2011 election, representing the electoral district of Vancouver South as part of the Conservative Party of Canada, but was defeated by Liberal Party candidate Harjit Sajjan in the 2015 election. She subsequently contested the 2018 Vancouver mayoral election as leader of Coalition Vancouver, and the 2019 federal election as a Conservative candidate, but was unsuccessful. As of 2025, Young remains the only Conservative Party candidate elected to the House of Commons from a Vancouver-based riding in the 21st century.

== Personal life and career ==
She was born in Hong Kong, and immigrated to Canada at the age of four. She attended Killarney Secondary School in Vancouver, and graduated from the University of British Columbia (UBC) in 1982 with a degree in sociology. Young has also taken post-graduate coursework in Mass Communications and Urban Planning and Design at Simon Fraser University and the British Columbia Institute of Technology. She is a mother of twins and has been the foster parent of seven children.

After graduating from UBC, Young worked for the provincial Ministry of Children and Family Development and the federal Ministry of Citizenship and Immigration. She then founded a consultancy business in 1993, helping community groups access funding from different levels of governments; her clientele included the Vancouver Chinatown Business Improvement Association, South Vancouver Policing Centre and S.U.C.C.E.S.S. Some of her work includes developing services for immigrants, and helping to found the Canadian Immigrant Settlement Sector Alliance (CISSA). Young founded and chaired Canada's first Youth-At-Risk Task Force, which became the National Crime Prevention Program; she also established Canada's longest-running breakfast program for underprivileged children.

Young has spent over thirty years working and volunteering in Vancouver's Downtown Eastside, and served in various capacities at a number of community agencies, including as president of the Strathcona Community Centre Association, and as a director of YWCA Vancouver.

== Politics ==
She ran as a Conservative candidate in the 2008 federal election, facing Liberal candidate and former Premier of British Columbia Ujjal Dosanjh in Vancouver South. Initial validated results indicated both candidates received 38.4% of the vote, with Dosanjh winning by 33 votes over Young. The slim margin automatically triggered a recount, which confirmed Dosanjh's victory but only by a margin of 22 votes. The Conservative Party requested a second judicial recount, which again confirmed Dosanjh as the victor.

Young once again faced Dosanjh in the 2011 federal election, this time defeating him by a margin of nearly 4,000 votes; she became the first Conservative member of parliament (MP) to be elected in Vancouver since 1988. As the only government MP in Vancouver, she championed for various projects within the city, including the Kitsilano Neighbourhood House, Supportive Community Housing, the Salvation Army Deborah's Gate Program, the Wavefront Wireless Commercialization Centre Society and the Asia Pacific Gateway Skills Program. Regarding the first SkyTrain faregate, Young said, "The new faregates will make SkyTrain service safer and more secure for commuters." On January 7, 2014, Young announced $2.5 million of federal funding towards the Killarney Seniors Centre.

On October 26, 2011, Young was elected vice-chair of the Canada-China Legislative Association (CCLA); she was subsequently elected as chair on March 5, 2013. This association provides a forum for discussing bilateral and multilateral issues facing both Canada and China.

After being defeated by Liberal Party candidate Harjit Sajjan in the 2015 federal election, she considered contesting the Non-Partisan Association nomination for the 2018 Vancouver mayoral election, but instead formed her own municipal party Coalition Vancouver on June 21, 2018; she came in fourth place at the October 2018 mayoral election. In July 2019, Young was announced as the Conservative candidate in Vancouver South for that year's federal election, but lost in a rematch with Sajjan. She subsequently sought the Conservative nomination for Richmond East—Steveston in the 2025 federal election, but was unsuccessful.

== Electoral record ==
=== Federal ===
2019 Canadian federal election: Vancouver South
Party	Candidate	Votes	%	±%	Expenditures
Liberal	Harjit Sajjan	17,808	41.23	–7.58	$94,051.97
Conservative	Wai Young	14,388	33.31	–0.57	$82,435.52
New Democratic	Sean McQuillan	8,015	18.56	+4.59	$4,489.04
Green	Judy Zaichkowsky	2,451	5.67	+3.10	$4,303.51
People's	Alain Deng	532	1.23	–	$11,771.39
Total valid votes/expense limit		43,194	99.01	–	$105,031.23
Total rejected ballots		431	0.99	+0.41	
Turnout		43,625	58.30	–4.90	
Eligible voters		74,826			
Liberal hold		Swing		–3.51	
Source: Elections Canada

2015 Canadian federal election: Vancouver South
Party	Candidate	Votes	%	±%	Expenditures
Liberal	Harjit Sajjan	21,773	48.81	+15.05	$161,402.16
Conservative	Wai Young	15,115	33.88	-8.54	$118,748.27
New Democratic	Amandeep Nijjar	6,230	13.97	-7.10	$63,954.79
Green	Elain Ng	1,149	2.58	+0.37	$5,232.68
Marxist–Leninist	Charles Boylan	178	0.40	-0.09	–
Progressive Canadian	Raj Gupta	166	0.37	–	–
Total valid votes/Expense limit		44,611	100.00		$203,440.39
Total rejected ballots		259	0.58	–	
Turnout		44,870	64.04	–	
Eligible voters		70,062			
Liberal gain from Conservative		Swing		+11.80	
Source: Elections Canada

2011 federal election redistributed results
Party	Vote	%
Conservative	15,571	42.43
Liberal	12,389	33.76
New Democratic	7,732	21.07
Green	808	2.20
Others	202	0.55

2011 Canadian federal election
Party	Candidate	Votes	%	±%
Conservative	Wai Young	19,504	43.31	+4.87
Liberal	Ujjal Dosanjh	15,604	34.65	-3.84
New Democratic	Meena Wong	8,552	18.99	+1.37
Green	Jean Hakizimana	1,151	2.55	-2.38
Marxist–Leninist	Charles Boylan	222	0.49	-0.01
Total valid votes		45,033	100.0	
Total rejected ballots		281	0.62	+0.09
Turnout		45,314	55.77	+3.77
Eligible voters		81,245		
Conservative gain from Liberal		Swing		+4.36

2008 Canadian federal election
Party	Candidate	Votes	%	±%	Expenditures
Liberal	Ujjal Dosanjh	16,110	38.49	-9.56	$74,163
Conservative	Wai Young	16,090	38.44	+11.30	$80,086
New Democratic	Ann Chambers	7,376	17.62	-3.45	$22,765
Green	Csaba Gulyas	2,065	4.93	+1.65	$413
Marxist–Leninist	Charles Boylan	211	0.50	+0.04	
Total valid votes/Expense limit		41,852	100.0		$85,093
Total rejected ballots		223	0.53	+0.12	
Turnout		42,075	52.00	-4.00	
Liberal hold		Swing		-10.43	

=== Municipal ===
2018 Vancouver municipal election: Vancouver Mayor
Party	Candidate	Votes	%	Elected
Independent	Kennedy Stewart	49,705	28.71	✓
NPA	Ken Sim	48,748	28.16	
Independent	Shauna Sylvester	35,457	20.48	
Coalition Vancouver	Wai Young	11,872	6.86	
Yes Vancouver	Hector Bremner	9,924	5.73	
Vancouver 1st	Fred Harding	5,640	3.26	
ProVancouver	David Chen	3,573	2.06	
Independent	Sean Cassidy	1,536	0.89	
IDEA Vancouver	Connie Fogal	1,435	0.83	
Independent	Mike Hansen	951	0.55	
Independent	Jason Lamarche	695	0.40	
Independent	Rollergirl	686	0.40	
Independent	Ping Chan	653	0.38	
Independent	John Yano	510	0.29	
Independent	Tim Ly	349	0.20	
Independent	Sophia C. Kaiser	336	0.19	
Independent	Satwant K. Shottha	331	0.19	
Independent	Lawrence Massey	233	0.13	
Independent	Katy Le Rougetel	181	0.10	
Independent	Gölök Z. Buday	178	0.10	
Independent	Maynard Aubichon	139	0.08	

== Awards ==
- Queens Diamond Jubilee Medal Recipient
- YWCA Woman of Distinction Award Nominee
- Volunteer of the Year, Vancouver Board of Parks and Recreation
