= Ken Sim =

Former mayor of Vancouver from 2022 to 2026

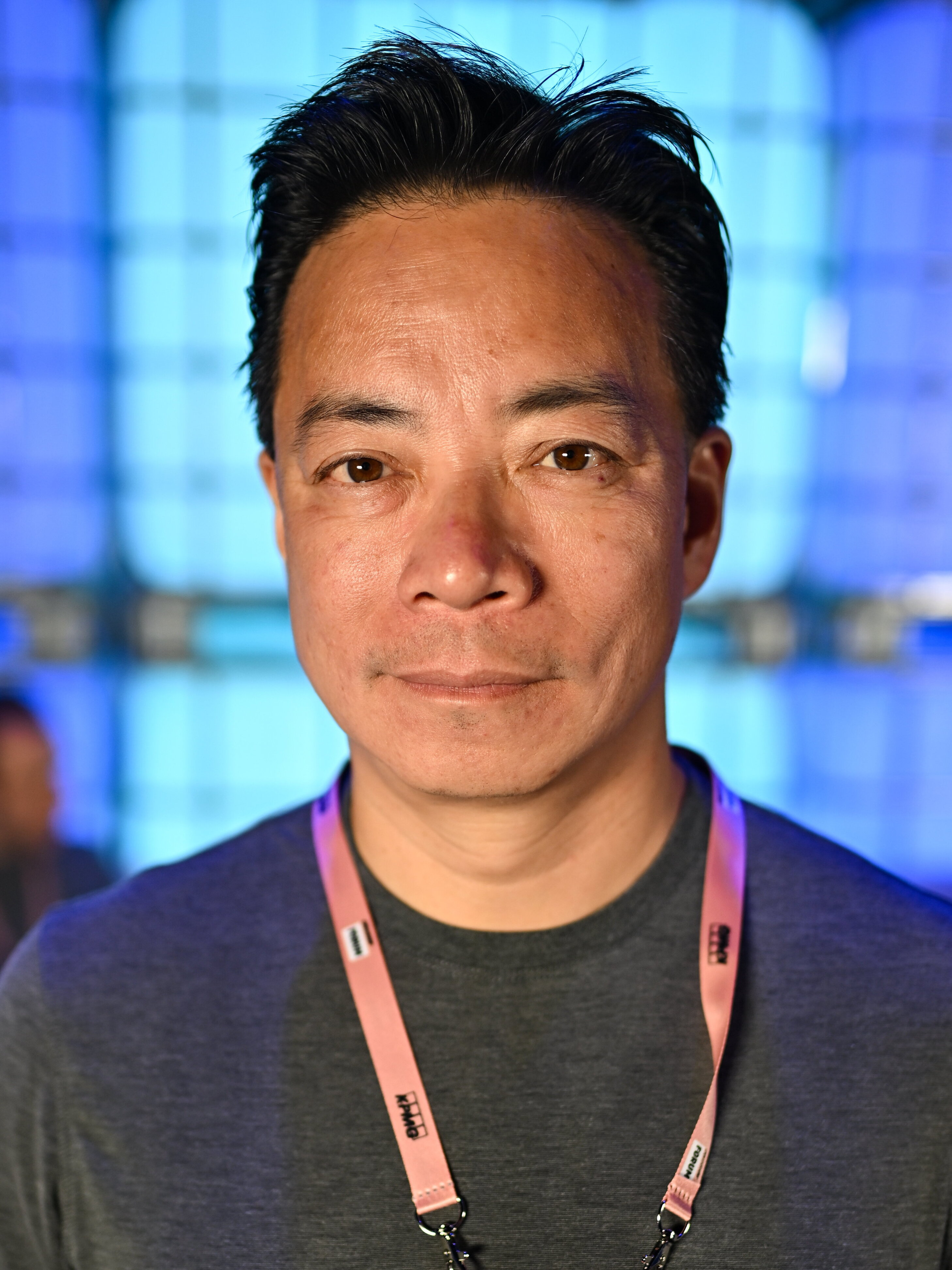
- Sim in 2024

41st Mayor of Vancouver
- In office November 7, 2022 – November 2, 2026
- Preceded by: Kennedy Stewart
- Succeeded by: Pete Fry

Personal details
- Born: Kenneth Sim; October 18, 1970 (age 56) Vancouver, British Columbia, Canada
- Party: ABC Vancouver (municipal)
- Other political affiliations: Non-Partisan Association (2018)
- Spouse: Teena Gupta
- Education: University of British Columbia (BCom)
- Profession: Businessman

Kenneth Sim is a Canadian politician and businessman who served as the 41st mayor of Vancouver from 2022 to 2026. He was the city's first Chinese-Canadian mayor. In the 2026 municipal elections, he was defeated by Pete Fry of the Green Party of Vancouver.

== Early life ==
Born in Vancouver to Teochew Hong Kong immigrants Francis Sim (d. 1999) and Maria Theresa Kim (1932–2016), Sim attended Magee Secondary School, Sir Winston Churchill Secondary School, and the UBC Sauder School of Business, graduating with a Bachelor of Commerce in finance in 1993. He also holds a FCPA and FCA accounting designation.

Sim co-founded Nurse Next Door Home Healthcare Services in 2001, and has founded multiple businesses since then.

=== Early political career ===
Sim first ran for mayor of Vancouver with the Non-Partisan Association in the 2018 Vancouver municipal election and finished the runner-up to Kennedy Stewart.

== Mayor of Vancouver (2022-2026) ==
Sim was elected mayor of Vancouver, running under the ABC Vancouver party banner, on October 15, 2022. He is the first challenger to defeat a sitting mayor of Vancouver since 1980, when Mike Harcourt upset incumbent Jack Volrich. In the 2026 municipal election, he was defeated by Green Party of Vancouver candidate Pete Fry.

=== Tenure ===
Sim's ABC Vancouver faced defeat in the 2025 Vancouver City Council by-election, with his party's candidates placing sixth and seventh, respectively. In addition, his former chief of staff and 2022 campaign manager, Kareem Allam, formed the Vancouver Liberals after a dispute with the mayor. 2022 ABC Vancouver elected officials Victoria Jung, Christopher JK Richardson, Rebecca Bligh, Brennan Bastyovanszky, Laura Christensen, and Scott Jensen have all either been ejected or have resigned from the party.

==== Homelessness and housing ====
In March 2023, during Sim's mayoral term, a homeless count was commenced by the Homelessness Services Association of BC, the first since the beginning of the pandemic. The results of the count were released in October 2023, showing a 32% increase in homelessness since 2020.

Sim's plan to address the homeless crisis in Vancouver has centred on partnership with Provincial and Federal government programs. Within his first 45 days in office Sim and the ABC-dominated Council expedited work camp-style housing in partnership with BC Housing that implemented 90 units on City property. On March 27, 2023, Sim and Provincial Housing Minister Ravi Kahlon announced a plan to open 330 additional units by June 2023. In addition, ABC Vancouver have repeatedly stated their intent to decrease permit processing times as additional means to stimulate the development of new, permanent housing.

In early April 2023, news outlets began reporting on the City of Vancouver's efforts to bring the East Hastings encampment to a close. Sim remarked that the conclusion of the encampment is part of a larger effort of "finding empathetic ways to get people off the streets and into housing that they need."

On April 5, 2023, Sim announced the encampment would be brought to a close. By the end of the April 5, city workers removed most of the encampment on Hastings, disposed of much of the debris left by the encampment, and offered residents temporary re-homing to shelters while the city awaits new more permanent housing to arrive in June. As part of the operation April 5 and 6, crews took down 94 "entrenched structures" and removed 50 propane tanks from the encampment zone. More than 70 totes for storage were also provided to individuals and stored off-site.

==== Park board ====
On December 6, 2023, three ABC Vancouver Vancouver Park Board commissioners left the party to sit as independents after Sim introduced a motion to ask the provincial government to change the Vancouver Charter to dissolve the park board. While remaining independent, they have indicated they will form a majority bloc with Green Party commissioner Tom Digby.

==== Mental health ====
During the 2022 campaign, Sim promised he would hire 100 nurses to join the previously established Car 87 program, alongside 100 new police officers. On February 14, 2023, Vancouver City Council voted to allocate $2.8 million to Vancouver Coastal Health, to hire 58 mental health workers "to support people who are suffering from mental illness combined with lack of stable housing and substance abuse issues."

=== City finances ===
Sim announced in April 2023 that he would create a task force with a mandate to review the city's operating and capital budgets and recommend ways tax dollars can be spent more efficiently and responsibly.

Sim's major campaign promises included increases to the budget of VPD and a commitment to pay for these budget increases without cutting services or increasing property taxes. Despite campaign promises, in a council meeting early in his term, he suggested that the Vancouver Public Library should look into "potential revenue opportunities" to fund operations.

Vancouver City Council increased property taxes by 10.7% during Sim's first year in office. The property tax increase resulted in the average condo owner paying an additional 33 cents per day and the average home owner paying an additional 83 cents per day in property taxes. Council also voted to eliminate the controversial 25 cent "cup fee" on single-use beverage cups.

Sim and his council increased property taxes by an additional 7.5% in his second year. In December 2025, he proposed a motion that would explore the city converting some of its reserves into bitcoin.

=== Controversies ===
Sim was criticized by members of the Green Party of Vancouver for converting a boardroom at Vancouver City Hall into a personal gym.

==== Foreign interference allegations ====
In 2023, The Globe and Mail published statements from an anonymous Canadian Security Intelligence Service source alleging that China interfered in the 2022 Vancouver municipal election. Sim rejected these allegations and stated "If there's proof of foreign interference in our election, I want to know about it because I'm a Canadian … but right now there are a bunch of insinuations."

==== Sean Orr drug hoax ====
In February 2026, Sim alleged at a Chinese-language media briefing on February 6 that COPE councillor Sean Orr had distributed illegal drugs on Christmas Day. CBC News reported that the allegation was unsubstantiated and that Orr denied it, stating he had been visiting family on the Sunshine Coast at the time.

Sim apologized to Orr by phone and addressed reporters on February 27, stating that he had spoken with Orr and apologized but declined to answer further questions.

On March 3, 2026, Sim held a press conference stating that his comments were based on an unverified photograph shown to him by a member of the public. Orr said the apology was insufficient and stated he was considering a defamation lawsuit and a complaint to Vancouver's integrity commissioner.

== Personal life ==
Sim resides in West Point Grey with his wife and their four sons. He has said that his children's inability to see "a future for themselves in Vancouver" was a primary reason for his involvement in politics.

Hong Kong politician Bernard Charnwut Chan is a first cousin. Sim's father was Chan's maternal uncle. Canadian intelligence analyst Scott McGregor and journalist Ina Mitchell noted in their book, The Mosaic Effect, that Bernard's father, Robin Chan, who is Sim's uncle, held the role of vice chairman of the All-China Federation of Returned Overseas Chinese (ACFROC), a top-ranking organization in the Chinese Communist Party's united front network.

Sim has taken training programs held by Landmark Worldwide, described by some as a cult, crediting the training with teaching him how to have "authentic conversations" and giving him the confidence to run for mayor.

== Electoral record ==
2026 Vancouver municipal election: Mayor
Party	Candidate	Votes	%	Elected
Green	Pete Fry	98,494	47.78	✓
ABC Vancouver	Ken Sim (incumbent)	67,467	32.73	
TEAM	Colleen Hardwick	18,105	8.78	
Liberal	Kareem Allam	10,580	5.13	
Vote Vancouver	Rebecca Bligh	8,681	4.21	
Bright Future	Muhammad Ahmad	1,352	0.66	
Independent	Scott Gilbert	1,135	0.55	
Independent	Amauri Caliman	347	0.17	
Source: CBC

2022 Vancouver municipal election: Mayor
Party	Candidate	Votes	%	Elected
ABC Vancouver	Ken Sim	85,732	50.96	✓
Forward Together	Kennedy Stewart (incumbent)	49,593	29.48	
TEAM	Colleen Hardwick	16,769	9.97	
Progress Vancouver	Mark Marissen	5,830	3.47	
NPA	Fred Harding	3,905	2.32	
Independent	Leona Brown	1,519	0.9	
Independent	Ping Chan	1,154	0.69	
Independent	Françoise Raunet	1,116	0.66	
Independent	Satwant Shottha	994	0.59	
Independent	Imtiaz Popat	411	0.24	
Independent	Lewis Villegas	363	0.22	
Independent	Mike Hansen	314	0.19	
Independent	Gölök Buday	195	0.12	
Independent	Ryan Charmley	183	0.11	
Independent	Dante Teti	142	0.08	
ABC Vancouver gain from Forward Together		Swing		+11.02 (Note: Calculated using Ken Sim's and Kennedy Stewart's 2018 results.)
Source: City of Vancouver

2018 Vancouver municipal election: Mayor
Party	Candidate	Votes	%	Elected
Independent	Kennedy Stewart	49,705	28.71	✓
NPA	Ken Sim	48,748	28.16	
Independent	Shauna Sylvester	35,457	20.48	
Coalition Vancouver	Wai Young	11,872	6.86	
Yes Vancouver	Hector Bremner	9,924	5.73	
Vancouver 1st	Fred Harding	5,640	3.26	
ProVancouver	David Chen	3,573	2.06	
Independent	Sean Cassidy	1,536	0.89	
IDEA Vancouver	Connie Fogal	1,435	0.83	
Independent	Mike Hansen	951	0.55	
Independent	Jason Lamarche	695	0.40	
Independent	Rollergirl	686	0.40	
Independent	Ping Chan	653	0.38	
Independent	John Yano	510	0.29	
Independent	Tim Ly	349	0.20	
Independent	Sophia C. Kaiser	336	0.19	
Independent	Satwant K. Shottha	331	0.19	
Independent	Lawrence Massey	233	0.13	
Independent	Katy Le Rougetel	181	0.10	
Independent	Gölök Z. Buday	178	0.10	
Independent	Maynard Aubichon	139	0.08	
