= HelpSeeker Technologies =

Canadian software company

- Industry: Software
- Founded: 2018
- Headquarters: Calgary
- Key people: Alina Turner; Travis Turner
- Website: www.helpseeker.org

HelpSeeker Technologies is a Canadian software company that was founded in 2018 and awarded $2.5 million from the Government of Canada in 2021.

== Organization and history ==
HelpSeeker is based in Calgary, Alberta. It was founded in 2018 by Alina Turner and Travis Turner who are married.

The company was given $2.5 million by the Government of Canada in 2021.

== Activities ==
The company sells digital products that assist clients to understand social services around them.

Vancouver Police Department commissioned HelpSeeker to analyse spending on social services in Vancouver during 2018 and 2019. HelpSeeker charged the police $149,000 for the work. Vancouver Mayor Ken Sim was critical of HelpSeekers analysis, stating "It is difficult to trace the source of the figures given in this report." Mike Farnworth, Canada's Minister of Public Safety was also critical of the analysis, calling it "sensationalized" and "misleading".

Edmonton Police Service commissioned HelpSeeker to produce a report called Money in the System. Ottawa Police Service engaged HelpSeeker in 2021 to provide a "Social Impact Audit."
