= Hector Bremner =

Canadian politician

Vancouver City Councillor
- In office 2017–2018

Personal details
- Born: Edmonton, Alberta
- Citizenship: Canadian
- Party: Yes Vancouver
- Other political affiliations: BC Liberal (since 2013); NPA (2017–2018)

Hector Bremner is a Canadian politician, who served as a member of the Vancouver City Council in Vancouver, British Columbia, from 2017 to 2018.

== Early life ==
Born in Edmonton, Alberta, Bremner spent his early childhood years in Saskatoon, Saskatchewan. However, in the early 1990s, when Bremner was a young teenager, his home life became unstable and he "found himself couch-surfing with either his mom or his dad as they would stay with friends or move to different cities in search of opportunities", according to The Georgia Straight. His experience with homelessness led him to develop a personal concern for the issue of housing.

== Career ==
Bremner started his working life as a used car salesman on Vancouver Island. Bremner pursued a career in business development and operations management. In 2007 he founded the now-defunct TOUCH Marketing, and he served as vice-president of public affairs at Pace Group Communications.

He fundraised for the Canadian Olympic Committee, and served on the BC Children's Hospital Foundation's 2017 A Night of Miracles Cabinet, as well as other not-for-profit causes.

== Politics ==
During the provincial elections of 2013, Bremner represented the BC Liberals in the riding of New Westminster, where NDP candidate Judy Darcy was ultimately elected. Following this, he was invited to join the provincial government as an executive assistant to B.C.'s then-Minister Responsible for Housing and Deputy Premier, Rich Coleman.

=== Non-Partisan Association ===
In the 2017 Vancouver municipal by-election, the Non-Partisan Association selected Bremner to run for city council. He ran on a "Let's Fix Housing" platform directed at tackling affordability through increasing rental supply. Bremner was elected with 13,372 votes.

On February 19, 2018, it was announced that Bremner would be seeking the nomination for the position of mayor to represent the Non-Partisan Association during the 2018 Vancouver municipal election. Shortly after announcing his candidacy for the NPA mayoral nomination, Bremner faced issues by the Non-Partisan Association Board of Directors. The NPA's Green Light Committee, which was charged with screening candidates, recommended approval of Hector Bremner's candidacy, but the board rejected this recommendation.

=== Yes Vancouver ===
On June 28, 2018, Bremner announced that he would start a new political party, and call it "Yes Vancouver". Controversy surrounded the branding because "Yes Vancouver" was also the name of a local women's philanthropic group that had been around for over ten years. On July 18, 2018, he revealed to The Georgia Straight that he would run for Mayor of Vancouver, with the aim of increasing the supply of housing in the city. After Vancouver developer Peter Wall admitted he spent $85,000 on billboards for Bremner's mayoral campaign as a third party, Bremner's campaign could not contain the controversy. In spite of raising $197,122.50 in declared donations, Bremner received less than 6% of the popular vote.

== Electoral results ==
=== Provincial ===
2013 British Columbia general election: New Westminster
Party	Candidate	Votes	%	±%	Expenditures
New Democratic	Judy Darcy	13,170	48.84	−7.52	$126,704
Liberal	Hector Bremner	8,997	33.37	−1.24	$56,036
Green	Terry Teather	2,252	8.35	−0.68	$1,417
Conservative	Paul Forseth	1,318	4.89	−	$1,450
Independent	James Crosty	1,038	3.85	−	#3,530
Libertarian	Lewis Dahlby	190	0.70	−	$250
Total valid votes		26,965	100.00		
Total rejected ballots		132	0.49		
Turnout		27,097	57.81		
Source: Elections BC

=== Municipal ===
2018 Vancouver municipal election: Mayor
Party	Candidate	Votes	%	Elected
Independent	Kennedy Stewart	49,705	28.71	✓
NPA	Ken Sim	48,748	28.16	
Independent	Shauna Sylvester	35,457	20.48	
Coalition Vancouver	Wai Young	11,872	6.86	
Yes Vancouver	Hector Bremner	9,924	5.73	
Vancouver 1st	Fred Harding	5,640	3.26	
ProVancouver	David Chen	3,573	2.06	
Independent	Sean Cassidy	1,536	0.89	
IDEA Vancouver	Connie Fogal	1,435	0.83	
Independent	Mike Hansen	951	0.55	
Independent	Jason Lamarche	695	0.40	
Independent	Rollergirl	686	0.40	
Independent	Ping Chan	653	0.38	
Independent	John Yano	510	0.29	
Independent	Tim Ly	349	0.20	
Independent	Sophia C. Kaiser	336	0.19	
Independent	Satwant K. Shottha	331	0.19	
Independent	Lawrence Massey	233	0.13	
Independent	Katy Le Rougetel	181	0.10	
Independent	Gölök Z. Buday	178	0.10	
Independent	Maynard Aubichon	139	0.08	

Vancouver municipal by-election, October 14, 2017: City Council Resignation of Geoff Meggs
Party	Candidate	Votes	%	Elected
NPA	Hector Bremner	13,372	27.83	✓
COPE	Jean Swanson	10,263	21.36	
Green	Pete Fry	9759	20.31	
OneCity	Judy Graves	6327	13.17	
Vision	Diego Cardona	5411	11.26	
Sensible Vancouver	Mary Jean Dunsdon	1737	3.62	
Independent	Gary Lee	886	1.84	
Independent	Damian J. Murphy	157	0.33	
Independent	Joshua Wasilenkoff	131	0.27	
NPA gain from Vision		Swing		–
