= Nurse Next Door Home Healthcare Services =

Home care services company

- Type: Private
- Industry: Medical and non-medical in-home care for seniors
- Founded: 2001; 25 years ago
- Founder: Ken Sim and John DeHart
- Headquarters: Vancouver, British Columbia, Canada
- Number of locations: 400+ locations
- Area served: North America, Australia and England
- Website: www.nursenextdoor.com www.nursenextdoor.com.au www.nursenextdoor.co.uk www.nursenextdoorfranchise.com www.nursenextdoorfranchise.com.au www.nursenextdoorfranchise.co.uk

Nurse Next Door Home Care Services is a franchise company offering in-home care to seniors and individuals needing support. Services range from companionship to round-the-clock nursing care. The system currently has over 400 franchise locations across Canada, US, Australia and England.

== History ==
Nurse Next Door Home Care Services was launched in Vancouver, British Columbia in September 2001 by co-founders Ken Sim and John DeHart. The two decided to start the company after trying to find quality care for Ken's pregnant wife Teena (who was placed on emergency bed rest with their first child). The company began franchising in April 2007 and has since added over 400 senior home care franchise locations across Canada, US, Australia and England.

The company has been recognized with numerous awards including the 2006 Ernst & Young Entrepreneur of the Year Award as well as being named as one of the top 10 small and medium employers in Canada in 2012. They are also 4 time top ten winners of BC Business Best Companies to Work For award, coming in 1st place in 2009 and 3rd place in 2012. Nurse Next Door Home Care Services has also been widely featured in media across Canada and the United States including The National Post, The Globe and Mail, CBC, The Vancouver Sun and Fortune Small Business Magazine.

Nurse Next Door was ranked #94 in global franchises and #54 in franchises less than $150,000 in 2025.

== Australia ==
Nurse Next Door Home Care Services awarded their first international deal, the company's Australian master franchise, in 2018 to Melbourne entrepreneurs Amber Biesse and Matt Fitton. Amber and Matt have been referred to as serial entrepreneurs, having operated multiple successful businesses during their careers. Due to the rapid growth of the National Disability Insurance Scheme (NDIS) and Australians’ increasing desire to age at home, Nurse Next Door Australia has experienced significant expansion. After launching their first franchise in May 2020, the Australian business had reached 59 locations operating nationally and established a corporate office in Melbourne by late 2024.

The brand was introduced to Australia with a corporately owned pilot location in Melbourne to establish local operations and adapt the North American model to Australian home care standards. Nurse Next Door’s entry coincided with the expansion of the NDIS and increasing consumer demand for in-home care services, both of which have supported rapid franchise growth across multiple states and territories. The company positions itself as a values-driven and “bold pink” home care provider offering both aged-care and disability support services, with its philosophy centred on “Happier Ageing®” and its purpose described as “Making Lives Better®”.

In recognition of this growth and network performance, Nurse Next Door Australia was awarded Franchisor of the Year at the inaugural Franchise Industry Awards (FIA), a national honor recognising excellence in franchise system performance, franchisee support, and strategic vision.

As of 2025, the brand operates a national network of local franchises throughout major metropolitan and regional centres including Perth, Brisbane, Geelong and Hobart, supported by a 24-hour, seven-day-a-week Care Services Centre based in Melbourne. The Australian network has been recognised for its strong organisational culture and franchise growth, with reports citing more than 3,000 care professionals and over 75 territories in operation by late 2024. The minimum investment for an Australian franchise starts at approximately A$125,000, and the model emphasises community-based owner-operators delivering personalised, client-focused care in the home.

== England ==
Prash and Karen Patel were awarded the master franchise rights for England by Nurse Next Door in 2023. This new venture marks a significant milestone in the company's European expansion aiming to introduce Nurse Next Door's Happier Aging™ philosophy to England.

== United States ==
In 2012, Nurse Next Door expanded into the United States market, opening its first American franchise location in Mission Viejo, California. Since entering the market, the company has established a footprint across major US regions. As of 2025, Nurse Next Door operates locations across the United States, with significant market presence in California, Texas, and Florida. The company has been consistently ranked in Entrepreneur magazine’s "Franchise 500," including recognition as a top franchise for veterans and a top global franchise. This ranking is based on an independent evaluation of the company's financial strength, stability, and system growth. Highlighting this momentum, the company climbed 57 spots in 2025 to rank #361 overall, while simultaneously breaking into the top 100 on the Top Global Franchises list at #94. Within the home care industry, this listing serves as a primary benchmark for investment viability, validating that Nurse Next Door's centralized support model and financial solvency have outperformed industry averages.

In the 2020s, the company expanded its integration with the US healthcare system by launching a dedicated initiative to serve American military veterans. This program focused on increasing the number of franchise locations approved to provide care within the US Department of Veterans Affairs (VA) Community Care Network.

Nurse Next Door's success across the United States due to its centralized support structure designed to minimize administrative overhead for franchise partners. A key component of this infrastructure is the Care Services Center (CSC), a 24/7 command hub based out of its corporate HeartQuarters. Unlike competitors decentralized models where individual franchise owners must manage after-hours logistics, the CSC handles client intake, scheduling, and caregiver coordination 24 hours a day, 365 days a year. Care Service Center manages over 1,800 calls daily, processing inquiries and filling shifts on behalf of franchise partners. By offloading these administrative tasks, the model allows franchise owners to focus on business development, community engagement, and local sales rather than day-to-day logistics. The brand is further distinguished by its "Bold Pink" visual identity, a marketing strategy designed to disrupt the traditional clinical aesthetics of the home care industry and increase consumer recognition.
