= Michael Marissen =

Canadian musicologist

Michael Marissen (born July 31, 1960 in Hamilton, Ontario) is a Canadian professor of music at Swarthmore College, where he joined the faculty in 1989.

== Education ==
Marissen studied music history at Calvin College and received his PhD from Brandeis University.

== Career ==
As well as his work as a professor of music at Swarthmore College, he has guest taught on the graduate faculty at Princeton University and the University of Pennsylvania. In June 2014 Marissen announced that he had retired from active teaching at Swarthmore, although he remains a professor emeritus. He now works as a freelance writer, lecturer, and scholar.

== Published works ==
Marissen's books, centered on the issue of music and religion, include The Social and Religious Designs of J. S. Bach's Brandenburg Concertos (Princeton, 1995), Lutheranism, Anti-Judaism, and Bach's St. John Passion: With an Annotated Literal Translation of the Libretto (Oxford, 1998), An Introduction to Bach Studies (Oxford, 1998) with Daniel R. Melamed, and Bach's Oratorios: The Parallel German-English Texts with Annotations (Oxford, 2008), and Bach & God (Oxford 2016).

=== New York Times article on Handel's Messiah ===
Marissen's most controversial work began as an essay published in The New York Times on Easter Sunday, April 8, 2007, entitled “Unsettling History of That Joyous ‘Hallelujah’", which is the basis for his recently published monograph entitled, Tainted Glory in Handel's Messiah: The Unsettling History of the World's Most Beloved Choral Work (Yale University Press, 2014). The first half of the book outlines his thesis that Handel and his librettist showed an unattractive and morally questionable anti-Judaism that manifested itself in "triumphalism," a caustic celebration of the defeat of the Jews at the hands of the Romans (in AD 70, with the siege of Jerusalem and the destruction of the Second Temple). The second half of the book contains an annotated libretto of "The Messiah," illuminating the many often obscure passages that rely on an extensive understanding of typology as a technique for understanding Christianity and the New Testament.

The article received a long series of spirited responses, including a follow-up news story in the Times, many letters to the editor, follow-up responses in a wide variety of publications (including from Watergate-figure Chuck Colson and from the religion author Martin E. Marty), along with extensive blog and internet newsgroup discussions.

=== Bach and God ===
His 2016 work, Bach and God, explored the religious character of Bach's vocal and instrumental music in seven interrelated essays. Making careful biblical and theological scrutiny of the librettos, he also shows how Bach's pitches, rhythms, and tone colors can create meaning that goes beyond setting texts in an aesthetically satisfying manner. In some of Bach's vocal repertory, the music uses his "learned counterpoint [to] powerfully project certain elements of traditional Lutheran theology.” The author also explores how Bach “took up anti-Judaism” in several cantatas while seeming to intentionally avoid or minimize the potential for anti-Jewish sentiment in his Passion settings.

In May 2016, Michael Marissen and his wife, author Lauren Belfer, were profiled in an article in The New York Times. In the article, they discuss their working process, Bach, and writing a novel with musical accuracy.

== Family ==
His younger brother is Mark Marissen, a prominent political strategist for the Liberal Party of British Columbia and the Liberal Party of Canada.
