= PlaceSpeak =

PlaceSpeak, Inc.
- Type: Private
- Industry: Public participation, Civic technology
- Founded: 2010
- Founder: Colleen Hardwick
- Headquarters: Vancouver, British Columbia, Canada
- Website: placespeak.com

PlaceSpeak is a location-based civic engagement platform designed to consult with people within specific geographic boundaries. It is a product of PlaceSpeak Inc., a Canadian technology company headquartered in Vancouver, British Columbia.

Its suite of feedback collection tools and features was designed with the International Association of Public Participation (IAP2) Spectrum of Public Participation in mind. PlaceSpeak has been used by public and private sector organizations to consult with the public on community plans, parks and recreation, public transit, public health, budgets, and more. As of late, it has supported the emergence of Smart Cities across the world with citizen engagement tools for real time development.

== History ==
Urban geographer Colleen Hardwick founded PlaceSpeak in 2010. The idea came to her while looking at a Google Map of Vancouver's Arbutus Corridor, and she posed a question about how to best consult with residents based on where they live. She thought that a tool was needed to provide a platform for government, decision makers and developers of public policy “to demonstrate honesty…and authenticity in their desire to respond to the will of the people”. Traditional forms of civic engagement, such as public meetings, often have low attendance with very selective participation; PlaceSpeak initially began as a way to supplement and enhance traditional forms of consultation. Hardwick developed the platform as a way to advance public participation. By 2011, the City of Vancouver was testing it as a way of gathering ideas from residents.

The PlaceSpeak platform was designed to enable open and transparent engagement by connecting people to local issues. By connecting users' digital identity to their physical location, PlaceSpeak keeps them notified of new and relevant public consultations in their communities, creating opportunities for dialogue between citizens and local government. The ability for proponents and participants to engage with each other reflects PlaceSpeak's two-sided market. Proponents register their organization with PlaceSpeak and set up a topic to consult with the public. Geo-verified users can respond to surveys, polls, discussion forums and participatory maps, providing insight into how residents in a specific area feel about a particular issue.

== Technology ==
PlaceSpeak is a cloud-based public participation platform that generates geo-spatial feedback data, closely related to a form of Volunteered Geographic Information (VGI). It is an e-consultation toolkit that allows proponents to connect with and geo-authenticate citizen users based on their location. It uses a 3-step digital identification process to authenticate a user's residential address. PlaceSpeak is based on a web application framework which enables GIS scaling and has a built in archiving structure. It has an Application Programming Interface that enables integration with third-party applications, such as Facebook and Twitter.

PlaceSpeak was developed with the support of the National Research Council of Canada (NRC-IRAP).

== Neighbourhoods ==
In 2015, PlaceSpeak launched Neighbourhoods, a private civic network that allows users to connect with people who live in their neighbourhood. Neighbourhoods pools together geo-verified users who live in the same area, providing key features like a community noticeboard and an events calendar once logged in. Any communication between registered residents is kept private.
