= 2017 Vancouver municipal by-election =

Canadian municipal by-election

- October 14, 2017

1 seat on the Vancouver City Council; 9 seats on Vancouver School Board
- Turnout: 11.0% ▼32.4 pp
- City council by-election
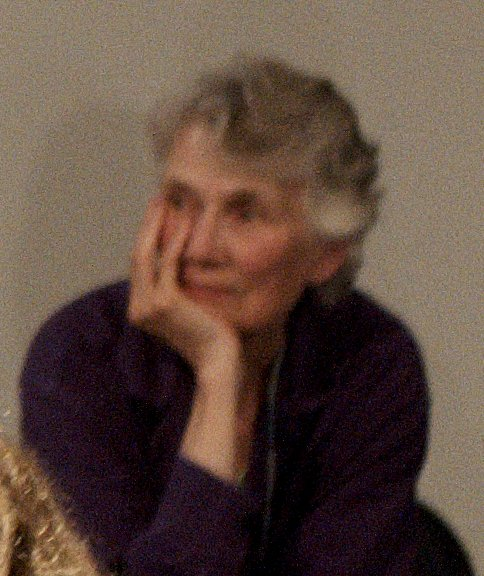

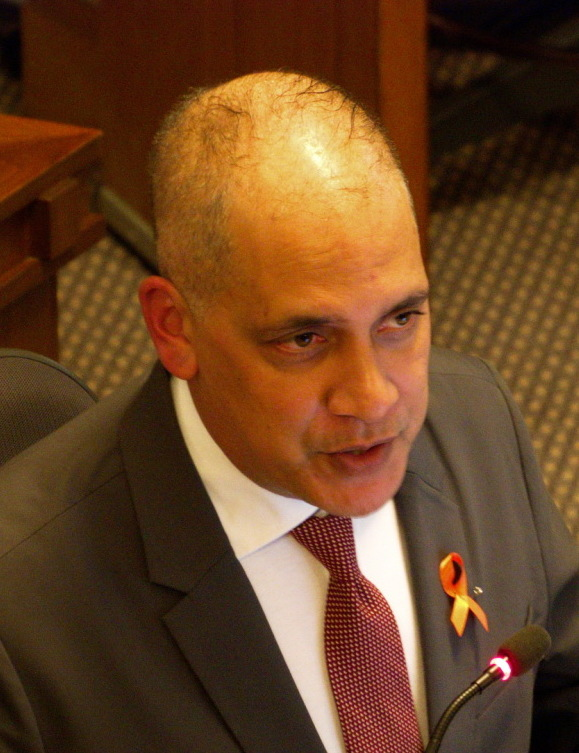
	NPA
Candidate	Hector Bremner	Jean Swanson	Pete Fry
Party	NPA	Independent	Green
Popular vote	13,372	10,263	9,759
Percentage	27.83	21.36	20.31
	ONECITY	VISION
Candidate	Judy Graves	Diego Cardona
Party	OneCity	Vision
Popular vote	6,327	5,411
Percentage	13.17	11.26
City councillor before election
Geoff Meggs
Vision
Elected City councillor
Hector Bremner
NPA
- School board by-election
Party	Seats	+/–
Green Party	3	+2
Vision Vancouver	3	−1
Non-Partisan Association	2	−2
OneCity Vancouver	1	+1
This lists parties that won seats. See the complete results below.

A municipal by-election was held in Vancouver, British Columbia, on October 14, 2017. One empty seat on city council and all the seats on the Vancouver school board were filled.

These elections were held outside the normal four-year schedule. Unlike in full elections, voters were only asked to elect one councillor and nine school board trustees rather than the full complement of elected municipal positions. The by-election was necessary for two reasons: the resignation of Vision Vancouver councillor Geoff Meggs from city council to become British Columbia premier John Horgan's chief of staff and the desire of the new provincial NDP government to reconstitute the Vancouver School Board, whose elected members had all been fired by the previous BC Liberal government.

The school board election marked the first time a OneCity candidate was elected to any position in Vancouver's elected government.

== Background ==
The by-election was called to replace the single vacant council seat, due to Geoff Meggs' departure to take on the role of Premier John Horgan's chief of staff. The by-election was also meant to elect a new board of school trustees, who had been dismissed by provincial education minister Mike Bernier after failing to pass a balanced budget and allegations of workplace harassment arose.

== Nomination process ==
=== Non-Partisan Association ===
On September 6, 2017, the Non-Partisan Association held a nomination meeting to decide their representative for the lone Council position. Hector Bremner, the successful nominee, beat out former school trustee Penny Noble and former leader of the Cedar Party Glen Chernen. Candidates for the five school trustee positions were announced at the same time.

=== Green Party ===
Pete Fry of the Green Party of Vancouver, who had unsuccessfully run for council in 2014, was the first confirmed nominee for council by any major political party in Vancouver. The Greens also nominated former incumbent Janet Fraser to run for re-election alongside Judy Zaichkowsky and Estrellita Gonzalez.

== Results ==
=== Councillor ===
Vancouver municipal by-election, October 14, 2017: City Council Resignation of Geoff Meggs
Party	Candidate	Votes	%	Elected
NPA	Hector Bremner	13,372	27.83	✓
COPE	Jean Swanson	10,263	21.36	
Green	Pete Fry	9759	20.31	
OneCity	Judy Graves	6327	13.17	
Vision	Diego Cardona	5411	11.26	
Sensible Vancouver	Mary Jean Dunsdon	1737	3.62	
Independent	Gary Lee	886	1.84	
Independent	Damian J. Murphy	157	0.33	
Independent	Joshua Wasilenkoff	131	0.27	
NPA gain from Vision		Swing		–

=== School board trustees ===
Each voter could cast up to nine votes.

(I) denotes incumbents prior to the dismissal of all nine school board trustees by Education minister Mike Bernier in October 2016.

Candidate Name	Party affiliation	Votes	% of votes	Elected
(I) Janet Fraser	Green Party of Vancouver	27,360	56.24%	X
Judy Zaichkowsky	Green Party of Vancouver	23,383	48.06%	X
Estrellita Gonzalez	Green Party of Vancouver	20,307	41.75%	X
(I) Joy Alexander	Vision Vancouver	19,709	40.52%	X
(I) Allan Wong	Vision Vancouver	18,678	38.40%	X
Lisa Dominato	Non-Partisan Association	18,258	37.53%	X
(I) Fraser Ballantyne	Non-Partisan Association	18,048	37.10%	X
Carrie Bercic	OneCity Vancouver	17,822	36.64%	X
Ken Clement	Vision Vancouver	17,583	36.15%	X
Theodora Lamb	Vision Vancouver	17,204	35.37%	
Robert McDowell	Non-Partisan Association	17,140	35.23%	
Erica Jaff	OneCity Vancouver	17,117	35.19%	
(I) Mike Lombardi	Vision Vancouver	17,094	35.14%	
(I) Christopher Richardson	Non-Partisan Association	16,839	34.62%	
Diana Day	Coalition of Progressive Electors	16,683	34.30%	
Julian Prieto	Non-Partisan Association	16,299	33.51%	
Adi Pick	Independent	10,263	21.10%	
Christine Arnold	Independent	9,209	18.93%	
Jamie Lee Hamilton	IDEA Vancouver	8,590	17.66%	
