= 2018 Vancouver municipal election =

Municipal election in British Columbia, Canada

- October 20, 2018

10 seats on the Vancouver City Council + 1 mayor; 9 seats on Vancouver School Board; 7 seats on Vancouver Park Board
- Turnout: 39.4% ▼4.0 pp
- Mayoral election
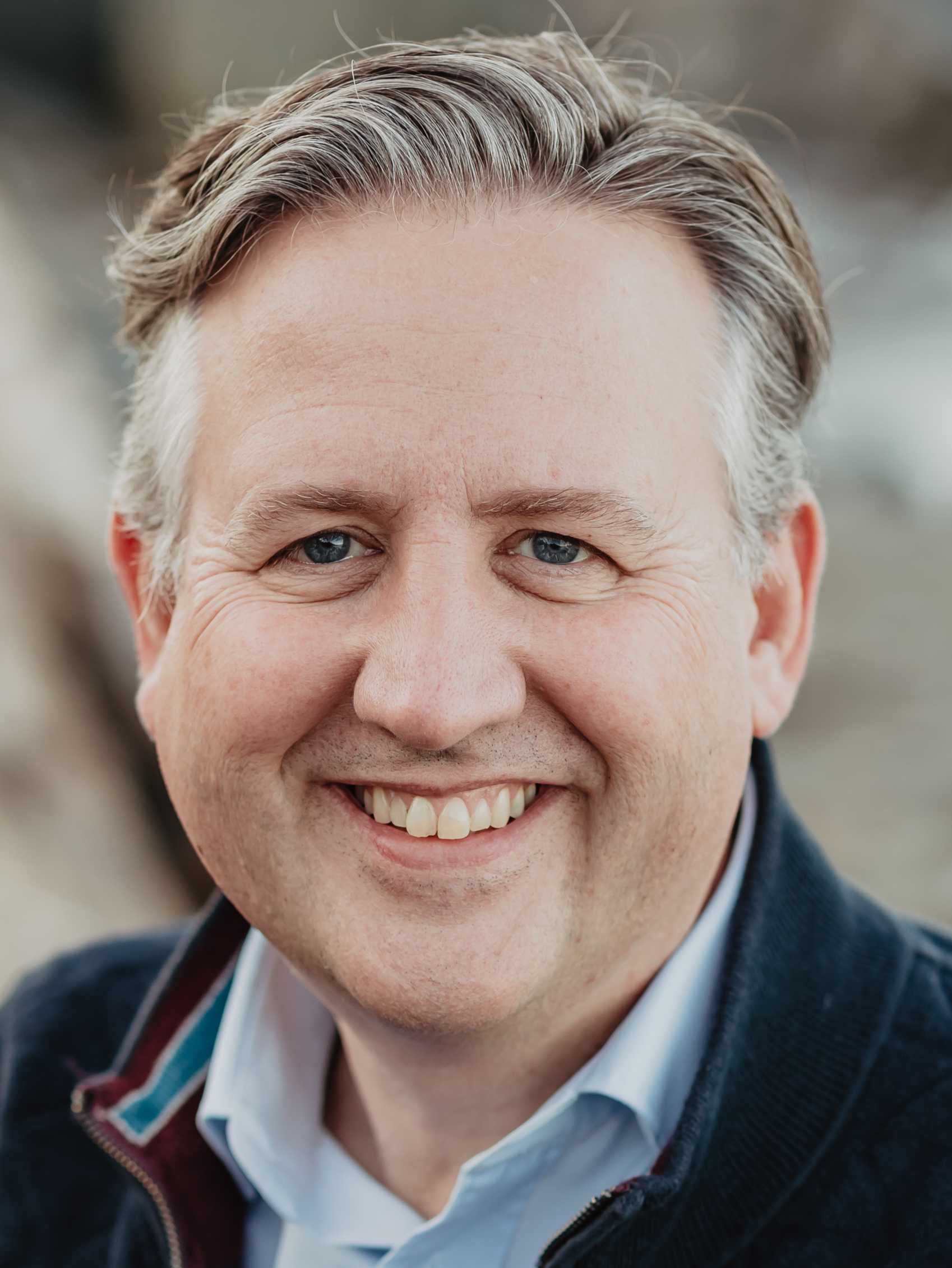

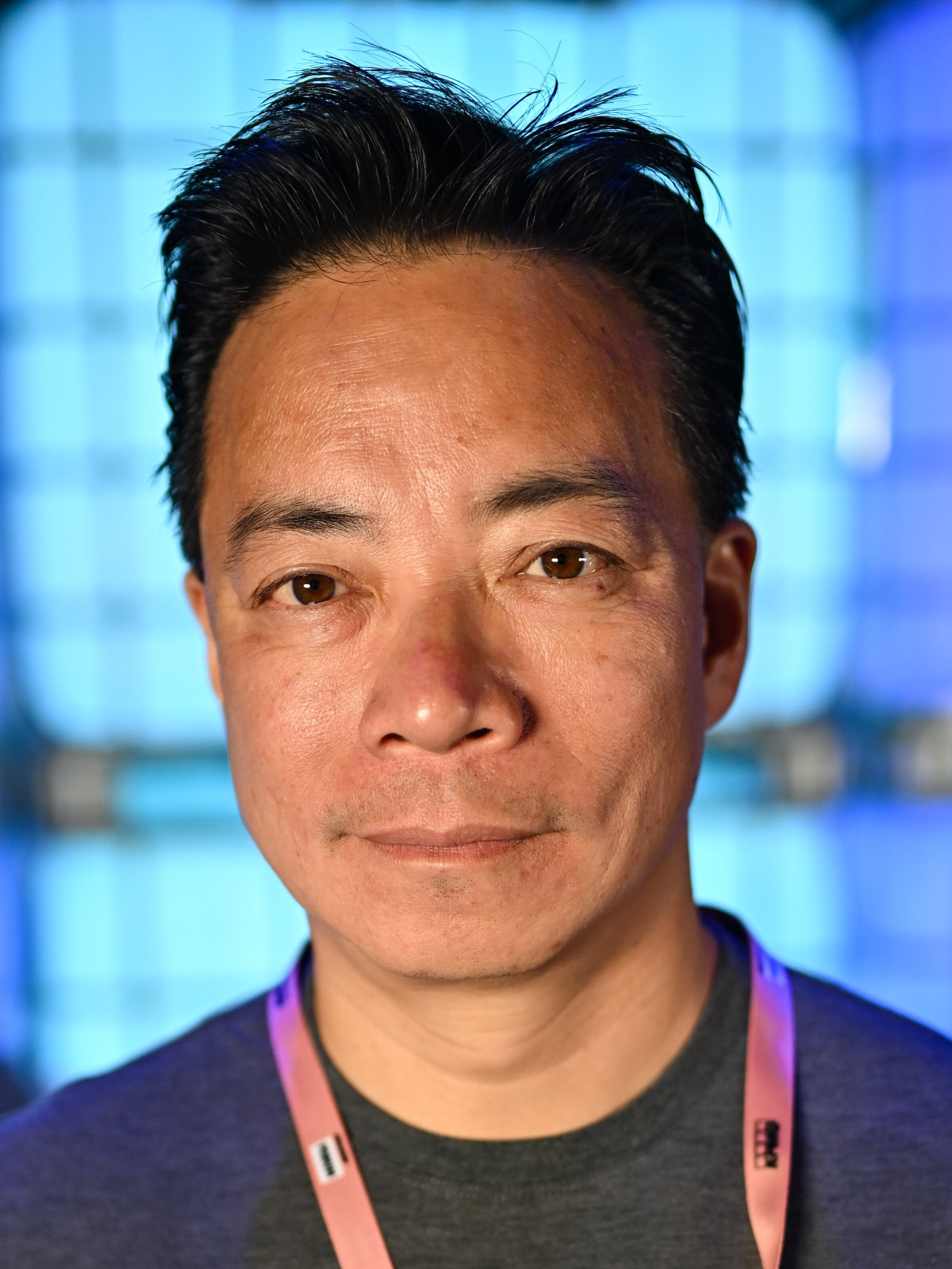

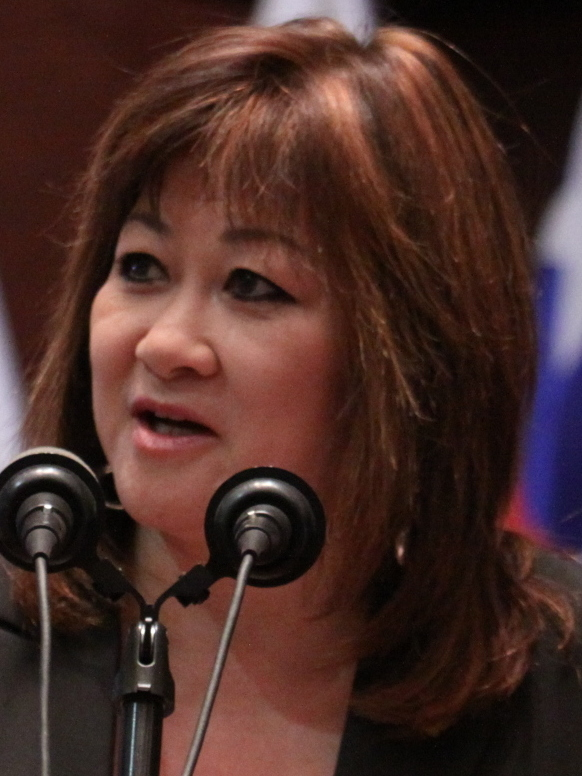
Candidate	Kennedy Stewart	Ken Sim	Shauna Sylvester
Party	Independent	NPA	Independent
Popular vote	49,705	48,748	35,457
Percentage	28.71%	28.16%	20.48%
		YES
Candidate	Wai Young	Hector Bremner
Party	Coalition Vancouver	Yes Vancouver
Popular vote	11,872	9,924
Percentage	6.86%	5.73%
- Mayoral results on a Voronoi diagram of polling stations
Mayor before election
Gregor Robertson
Vision
Elected Mayor
Kennedy Stewart
Independent
- Other elections
Party	Vote %	Seats	+/–
City Council (10 seats)
NPA	24.89	5	+2
Green	15.60	3	+2
COPE	8.86	1	+1
OneCity	5.84	1	+1
Park Board (7 seats)
Green	23.35	3	+1
NPA	10.85	2	−2
COPE	10.43	2	+2
School Board (9 seats)
Green	16.69	3	0
NPA	13.70	3	+1
OneCity	4.84	1	0
COPE	4.42	1	+1
Vision	4.34	1	−2
This lists parties that won seats. See the complete results below.

The 2018 Vancouver municipal election was held on October 20, 2018, the same day as other municipalities and regional districts in British Columbia selected their new municipal governments. Voters elected a mayor, 10 city councillors, 7 park board commissioners, and 9 school board trustees through plurality-at-large voting. Official registration for all candidates opened on September 4, 2018, and closed on September 14, 2018.

For the first time, candidates were listed in random order instead of alphabetical order. This was done in an effort to create a more even playing field for candidates, as research has shown many voters are more likely to vote for those listed first on a ballot, giving those candidates a perceived advantage over those lower down on the list.

== Candidates and results ==
- (I) indicates the candidate is an incumbent.
- (O) indicates the candidate previously held an elected position on another municipal body (e.g. a Park Board commissioner running to be a city councillor).

=== Mayor ===
Incumbent Gregor Robertson, who had been mayor of Vancouver since being elected in 2008, announced on January 10, 2018, that he would not be running for reelection in the 2018 election.

At the close of nominations, 21 candidates had formally registered to run for mayor in the election.

2018 Vancouver municipal election: Vancouver mayor
Party	Candidate	Votes	%	Elected
Independent	Kennedy Stewart	49,705	28.71	✓
NPA	Ken Sim	48,748	28.16	
Independent	Shauna Sylvester	35,457	20.48	
Coalition Vancouver	Wai Young	11,872	6.86	
Yes Vancouver	Hector Bremner	9,924	5.73	
Vancouver 1st	Fred Harding	5,640	3.26	
ProVancouver	David Chen	3,573	2.06	
Independent	Sean Cassidy	1,536	0.89	
IDEA Vancouver	Connie Fogal	1,435	0.83	
Independent	Mike Hansen	951	0.55	
Independent	Jason Lamarche	695	0.40	
Independent	Rollergirl	686	0.40	
Independent	Ping Chan	653	0.38	
Independent	John Yano	510	0.29	
Independent	Tim Ly	349	0.20	
Independent	Sophia C. Kaiser	336	0.19	
Independent	Satwant K. Shottha	331	0.19	
Independent	Lawrence Massey	233	0.13	
Independent	Katy Le Rougetel	181	0.10	
Independent	Gölök Z. Buday	178	0.10	
Independent	Maynard Aubichon	139	0.08	

==== Formerly declared mayoral candidates ====
- Patrick Condon (Coalition of Progressive Electors) withdrew from the race on July 13, 2018.
- Ian Campbell (Vision Vancouver) withdrew from the race on September 10, 2018.

=== City councillors ===
Distribution of seats in the Vancouver City Council after the 2018 municipal election

176,450 ballots were cast. Voters were able to cast votes for up to 10 candidates. The top 10 candidates were elected.

2018 Vancouver municipal election: Vancouver City Council
Party	Candidate	Votes	%	Elected
Green	(I) Adriane Carr	69,739	39.52	✓
Green	Pete Fry	61,806	35.03	✓
NPA	(I) Melissa De Genova	53,251	30.18	✓
COPE	Jean Swanson	48,865	27.69	✓
NPA	Colleen Hardwick	47,747	27.06	✓
Green	(O) Michael Wiebe	45,593	25.84	✓
OneCity	Christine Boyle	45,455	25.76	✓
NPA	(O) Lisa Dominato	44,689	25.33	✓
NPA	Rebecca Bligh	44,053	24.97	✓
NPA	(O) Sarah Kirby-Yung	43,581	24.70	✓
NPA	David Grewal	41,913	23.75	
Green	David H. Wong	40,887	23.17	
Vision	(I) Heather Deal	39,529	22.40	
COPE	Derrick O'Keefe	38,305	21.71	
NPA	Justin P. Goodrich	37,917	21.49	
COPE	Anne Roberts	36,531	20.70	
OneCity	Brandon O. Yan	36,167	20.50	
NPA	Jojo Quimpo	34,601	19.61	
Independent	Sarah Blyth	29,456	16.69	
Vision	Tanya Paz	28,836	16.34	
Vision	Diego Cardona	27,325	15.49	
Vision	(O) Catherine Evans	25,124	14.24	
Independent	(O) Erin Shum	23,331	13.22	
Vancouver 1st	Ken Low	21,908	12.42	
Independent	Adrian Crook	17,392	9.86	
Vision	Wei Q. Zhang	16,734	9.48	
Coalition Vancouver	Ken Charko	16,366	9.28	
Coalition Vancouver	James Lin	16,191	9.18	
Independent	Wade Grant	15,422	8.74	
Independent	Taqdir K. Bhandal	15,326	8.69	
Vancouver 1st	Elizabeth Taylor	15,184	8.61	
Coalition Vancouver	Penny Mussio	14,886	8.44	
Yes Vancouver	Brinder Bains	13,948	7.90	
Yes Vancouver	Stephanie Ostler	13,530	7.67	
Coalition Vancouver	Jason Xie	13,424	7.61	
Yes Vancouver	Glynnis C. Chan	13,218	7.49	
Coalition Vancouver	Glen Chernen	13,148	7.45	
Coalition Vancouver	Morning Li	12,614	7.15	
Vancouver 1st	Nycki K. Basra	12,133	6.88	
Yes Vancouver	Jaspreet Virdi	12,124	6.87	
Coalition Vancouver	Franco Peta	11,193	6.34	
Yes Vancouver	Phyllis Tang	11,902	6.75	
Independent	Rob McDowell	11,828	6.70	
Independent	Penny Noble	11,435	6.48	
Independent	Graham Cook	11,084	6.28	
Vancouver 1st	Michelle C. Mollineaux	8,819	5.00	
ProVancouver	Raza Mirza	8,783	4.98	
Vancouver 1st	Jesse Johl	8,609	4.88	
Independent	Barbara Buchanan	8,180	4.64	
ProVancouver	Breton Crellin	7,856	4.45	
Vancouver 1st	Elishia Perosa	7,489	4.24	
Independent	Anastasia Koutalianos	7,469	4.23	
Independent	Abubakar Khan	7,239	4.10	
Vancouver 1st	John Malusa	6,597	3.74	
Independent	Lisa Kristiansen	6,506	3.69	
ProVancouver	Rohana D. Rezel	6,336	3.59	
Independent	Françoise Raunet	5,891	3.34	
Independent	Hamdy El-Rayes	5,381	3.05	
Independent	Hsin-Chen Fu	5,007	2.84	
Independent	Justin Caudwell	4,488	2.54	
Independent	Harry Miedzygorski	4,308	2.44	
Independent	Gordon T. Kennedy	4,297	2.44	
Independent	Ashley Hughes	3,965	2.25	
Independent	Kelly Alm	3,440	1.95	
Independent	Marlo Franson	3,316	1.88	
Independent	John Spark	3,287	1.86	
Independent	Katherine Ramdeen	3,082	1.75	
Independent	Spike Peachey	2,863	1.62	
Independent	Larry J. Falls	2,768	1.57	
Independent	Elke Porter	2,515	1.43	
Independent	Ted Copeland	1,946	1.10	

=== Party standings in Vancouver City Council ===
Party	Seats on city council
NPA	5 / 10
Green	3 / 10
COPE	1 / 10
OneCity	1 / 10

=== Park board commissioners ===
Top 7 candidates elected

2018 Vancouver municipal election: Vancouver Park Board
Party	Candidate	Votes	%	Elected
Green	(I) Stuart Mackinnon	73,549	41.68	✓
Green	Dave Demers	73,167	41.47	✓
Green	Camil Dumont	65,303	37.01	✓
NPA	(I) John Coupar	49,768	28.21	✓
NPA	Tricia Barker	48,738	27.62	✓
COPE	Gwen Giesbrecht	48,404	27.43	✓
COPE	John Irwin	46,287	26.23	✓

=== Party standings in Vancouver Park Board ===
Party	Seats on park board
Green	3 / 7
NPA	2 / 7
COPE	2 / 7

=== School board trustees ===
Top 9 candidates elected

2018 Vancouver municipal election: Vancouver School Board
Party	Candidate	Votes	%	Elected
Green	(I) Janet Fraser	75,100	42.56	✓
Green	(I) Estrellita Gonzalez	58,409	33.10	✓
OneCity	Jennifer Reddy	52,757	29.90	✓
NPA	Oliver Hanson	49,932	28.30	✓
NPA	(I) Fraser Ballantyne	49,793	28.22	✓
NPA	Carmen Cho	49,541	28.08	✓
Green	Lois Chan-Pedley	48,409	27.43	✓
COPE	Barb Parrott	48,189	27.31	✓
Vision	(I) Allan Wong	47,301	26.81	✓

=== Party standings in Vancouver School Board ===
Party	Seats on school board
Green	3 / 9
NPA	3 / 9
OneCity	1 / 9
COPE	1 / 9
Vision	1 / 9

== Opinion polls ==
View source data.

Mayoral candidates
Polling firm	Dates conducted	Source	Stewart	Sim	Sylvester	Bremner	Young	Campbell	Other	Margin of error	Sample size	Polling method	Lead
2018 election	October 20, 2018		28.7%	28.2%	20.5%	5.7%	6.9%	—N/a	10.0%	—N/a	176,450	—N/a	0.5%
Research Co.	October 12–14, 2018		36%	23%	19%	6%	6%	–	9%	±6.0%	265	Online	13%
One Persuasion Inc.	October 11–13, 2018		33%	19%	21%	8%	16%	–	3%	±5.5%	318	Online	12%
Research Co.	October 4–7, 2018		34%	20%	16%	10%	7%	–	4%	±4.9%	402	Online	14%
Research Co.	September 15–18, 2018		36%	25%	17%	7%	3%	–	9%	±4.9%	400	Online	11%
	September 10, 2018	Vision mayoral candidate Ian Campbell withdraws											
Mainstreet	September 4–5, 2018		23.3%	12.4%	8.2%	13.6%	6.7%	9%	26.9%	±3.34%	862	IVR	9.7%
Research Co.	July 13–16, 2018		25%	26%	11%	5%	8%	20%	4%	±4.9%	400	Online	1%
Research Co.	June 9–11, 2018		26%	23%	9%	10%	3%	18%	13%	±4.9%	400	Online	3%

Political parties
Polling firm	Dates conducted	Source	Coalition Vancouver	COPE	Green	NPA	OneCity	ProVancouver	Vancouver 1st	Vision	Yes Vancouver	Independent
Research Co.	October 12–14, 2018		18%	34%	47%	35%	27%	16%	18%	29%	18%	53%
Research Co.	October 4–7, 2018		22%	32%	51%	34%	21%	22%	16%	27%	23%	50%
Research Co.	September 4–7, 2018		13%	32%	46%	30%	19%	9%	12%	30%	24%	39%
Research Co.	June 9–11, 2018		17%	28%	56%	30%	17%	11%	–	31%	–	–
Research Co.	April 9–10, 2018		–	27%	48%	23%	14%	–	–	26%	–	–
