= Anne Roberts =

Canadian politician and journalist

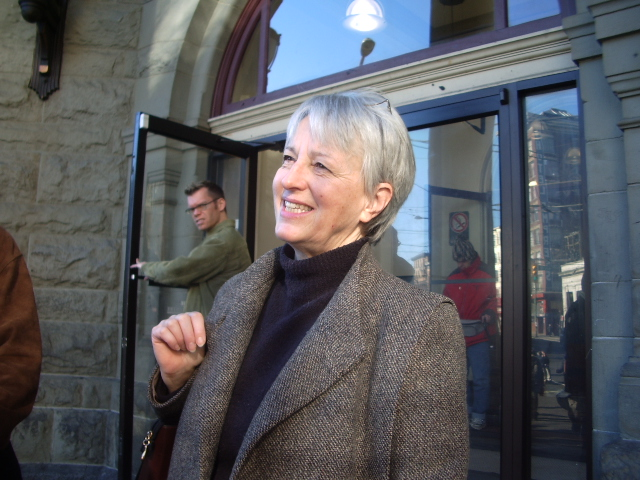
- Roberts visits a community centre in Vancouver's Downtown Eastside in early 2007.
- Occupation: College instructor (retired)
- Known for: Former Vancouver city councillor

Anne Roberts is a Canadian politician and retired journalism instructor. She served on Vancouver City Council from 2002 to 2005 as a member of the Coalition of Progressive Electors (COPE). Prior to entering politics, she taught journalism at Langara College.

== Political career ==
Roberts served as a trustee on the Vancouver School Board from 1993 to 1996. During her tenure, she also served as chair of the District Parent Representatives.

Roberts was elected to Vancouver City Council in the 2002 municipal election. She served as chair of the Planning and Environment Committee and was appointed by council as a delegate to the Greater Vancouver Regional District.

During her tenure, Roberts advocated for the expansion of child care spaces and services, and supported a $25-a-month subsidy for 600 daycare and preschool spaces. In November 2003, she voted against TransLink's ten-year plan, which included funding for the construction of Richmond–Airport–Vancouver (RAV) line (now known as the Canada Line).

In January 2004, Roberts voted against allowing slot machines in the city. In June 2005, she led the opposition to an application by Walmart to build a store in south Vancouver, citing concerns about traffic congestion and land use; on June 28, council voted 8–3 to reject the application. She also opposed the 2010 Winter Olympics.

She was among the five left-wing councillors described as "COPE Classic" by Charlie Smith of The Georgia Straight, in contrast to "COPE Lite", a term used for Mayor Larry Campbell and the three councillors who left COPE to form the centrist Vision Vancouver party ahead of the 2005 municipal election.

Roberts ran for re-election in 2005; she placed 19th with 41,739 votes and was not re-elected.

On April 27, 2018, Roberts announced that she would seek the party's nomination for the municipal election that October. She secured the nomination and was one of three COPE candidates for council in the general election, along with Jean Swanson and Derrick O'Keefe. During her campaign, she advocated for free transit for children aged 18 and under, reduced fares for low-income individuals, and an expansion of the U-Pass program. She also supported transitioning Vancouver to a ward-based electoral system instead of at-large representation. She received 36,531 votes, placing 16th and losing the election by approximately 7000 votes.
