= Progress Vancouver =

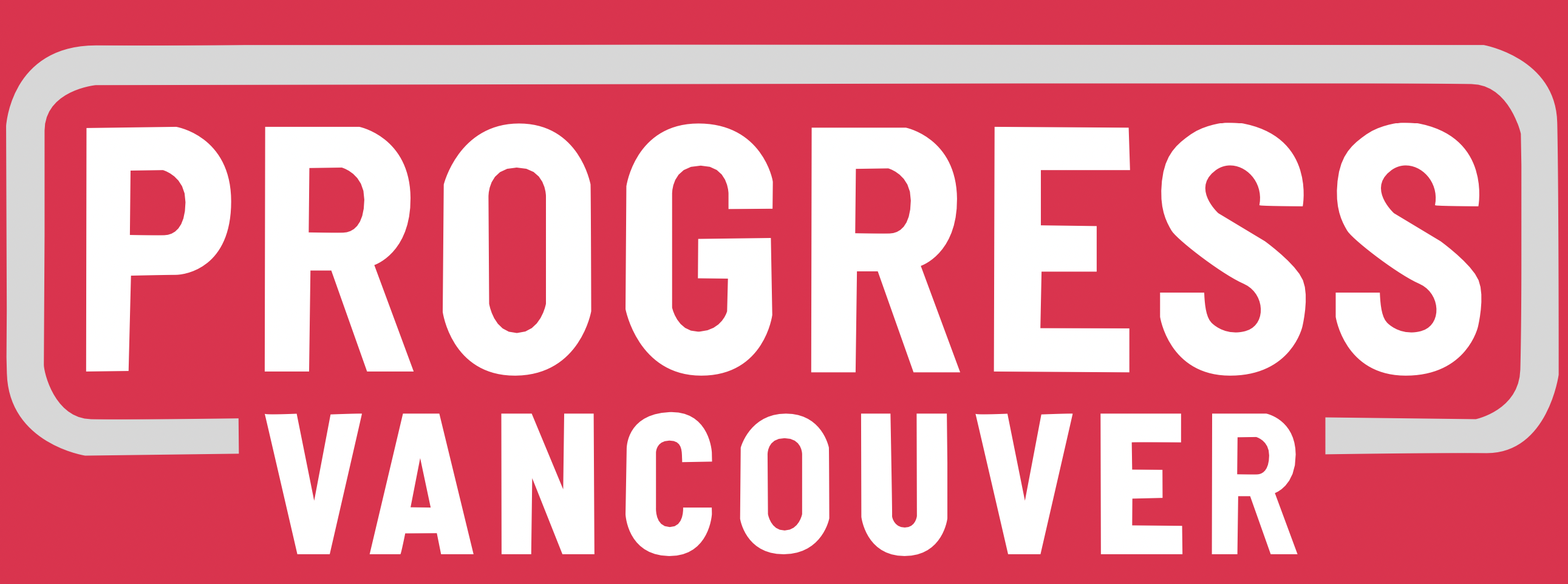
- Leader: Mark Marissen
- Chairperson: Azim Jiwani
- Founded: June 28, 2018
- Dissolved: July 4, 2023
- Split from: Non-Partisan Association
- Ideology: Progressivism; YIMBY
- Political position: Centre to centre-right

Website
- www.progressvancouver.ca

Progress Vancouver was a municipal political party in Vancouver, British Columbia, created in June 2018 to support the candidacy of Hector Bremner for mayor. Known as Yes Vancouver until October 2021, the party was the first municipal political party in British Columbia that stated their explicit dedication to YIMBY principles. The party was deregistered by Elections BC in July 2023.

== History ==
=== 2018 election ===
Hector Bremner was first elected as a Non-Partisan Association (NPA) councillor in the 2017 Vancouver by-election, but his bid to run for the party's mayoral nomination in the city's 2018 election was blocked by the party executive. The president of the NPA did not reveal the reasons for rejecting Bremner's bid for nomination. This resulted in a divide between Bremner and his supporters and the NPA leadership, prompting Bremner to split from the NPA and create Yes Vancouver on June 28, 2018. In October 2021, Yes Vancouver rebranded as Progress Vancouver.

=== 2022 election ===
Following the rebrand to Progress Vancouver, and changes to the makeup of the party board, Progress emerged as an urbanist, centrist party with candidates coming from centre-left and centre-right backgrounds. In addition to mayoral candidate Mark Marissen, Progress Vancouver nominated the following city council candidates: Asha Hayer, David Chin, Marie-Noelle Rosa, Mauro Francis, May He, and Morgane Oger. The party also nominated a candidate for director of Electoral Area A, Jonah Gonzalez.

=== Deregistration ===
On July 4, 2023, Elections BC deregistered Progress Vancouver for failing to meet campaign financing disclosure requirements following the 2022 election. Elections BC stated that the party's violations included accepting a non-permissible loan of $50,000, accepting prohibited campaign contributions from outside British Columbia, and accepting contributions more than the annual campaign contribution limit. All candidates who ran for Progress Vancouver in 2022 are disqualified from running again in a local election until after the 2026 general local elections. Elections BC also stated that their investigation into the party's finance was ongoing and further enforcement actions may be taken.

== Platform ==
The 2018 platform of Yes Vancouver mainly focused on the city's housing shortage. The party promised to increase the supply of rental housing in Vancouver to reduce the cost of rent by establishing citywide pre-zoning, using incentives on city-owned land to add affordable housing, and capping permit times. The party also supported the specific targeting of speculation over the current homeowners of Vancouver.

Progress Vancouver's 2022 platform was similarly focused on housing affordability, but also sought to address public safety, the drug poisoning crisis, and homelessness. Housing commitments included: allowing multi-family residential units city-wide, establishing a Vancouver Civic Housing Corporation, increase housing targets to 15,000 units annually, and enacting a luxury property surtax on the top 1% of properties in Vancouver. Public safety commitments included: redefining the Four-Pillar drug strategy, asking the provincial government to pilot safe supply, using vacant land to operate temporary emergency outdoor shelters, and increasing penalties for random, unprovoked stranger assaults.

== Electoral performance ==
Party leader Hector Bremner ran as Yes Vancouver's mayoral candidate for the Vancouver municipal election, held on October 20, 2018. Five candidates from Yes Vancouver ran for city council: entrepreneurs Brinder Bains, Glynnis Chan, Stephanie Ostler, Phyllis Tang and Jaspreet Virdi, none of whom were elected to city council. Educator and former NPA school board candidate Julian Prieto unsuccessfully ran for the Vancouver School Board for the second time, last running with the NPA during the 2017 by-election, and coach Leo Heba also unsuccessfully ran for the Vancouver Park Board.

Mayoral
Election year	Candidate	Votes	%	Position	Result
2018	Hector Bremner	9,940	5.73	5th	Not elected
2022	Mark Marissen	5,830	3.47	▲4th	Not elected

Vancouver City Council
Election	Seats	+/–	Votes	%	Change (pp)	Position
2018	0 / 11	▼1	64,792	4.63	Steady	No seats
2022	0 / 11	Steady	57,736	4.29	▼0.34	No seats
