= Coalition Vancouver =

- Leader: Wai Young
- President: Peter Labrie
- Founded: June 21, 2018
- Membership (2018): 1,000+
- Ideology: Conservatism; Economic liberalism; Populism
- Political position: Centre-right to right-wing
- Slogan: 100% for the people!

Website
- coalitionvancouver.ca

Coalition Vancouver was a municipal political party in Vancouver, British Columbia, founded by former Conservative member of Parliament Wai Young on June 21, 2018. It supported the mayoral candidacy of Young in the 2018 municipal election and ran on a populist platform.

== History ==
Wai Young announced her mayoral campaign for the 2018 municipal election and the creation of Coalition Vancouver on June 21, 2018. In a speech given in front of city hall, Young presented her populist platform and some of Coalition Vancouver's policies, such as cancelling what she called "luxury" bike lanes, increasing community consultation, and eliminating paid parking on Sundays. Young's opposition to bike lanes was a frequent talking point during the 2018 municipal election campaign, a position which earned her harsh criticism from some local commentators.

Coalition Vancouver's school board team was led by Ken Denike and Sophia Woo, both of whom had served as elected school board trustees. The pair were expelled from the centre-right Non-Partisan Association (NPA) in 2014 after they called for a delay to planned revisions to the Vancouver School Board's transgender policy.

Coalition Vancouver announced in a press statement released on October 11, 2018, that it was filing a civil lawsuit for defamation against Charles Menzies, a UBC professor and Board of Governors faculty representative. In the statement, the party denounced an email posted by Menzies to one of his personal blogs, in which he described Coalition Vancouver as "alt-right", "anti-gay and anti-trans extremists", and "fear mongers engaged in discrimination". Coalition Vancouver argued that the anti-LGBTQ+ claims made by Menzies were unfounded, and stated that "Coalition Vancouver and its candidates support the LGBTQ+ community and its members." Menzies' legal counsel responded by stating that they had not yet received a notice of civil claim, and pointed out Menzies was "exercising his right to political expression."

== Ideology ==
Coalition Vancouver described itself as a centre-right conservative party, but its policies were described by some critics as right-wing. The party promoted itself as anti-establishment and populist, asserting that all other municipal parties were under the influence of special interest groups, big business, and trade unions, while it was not.

Coalition Vancouver was economically liberal; its 2018 platform called for reductions in government spending and provincial taxes. For example, the party proposed keeping and renovating the Georgia and Dunsmuir viaducts, in contrast to Vision Vancouver's plan to demolish them. It also opposed the BC NDP's "school tax", calling it "socialist capital appropriation".

Coalition Vancouver's housing policies proposed neighbourhood-specific densification plans, the construction of entry-level homes (i.e. purpose-built new rental and co-op housing stock) and allowing one additional rental unit or laneway home for each detached home. The party believed that the city's housing problem was affordability, rather than shortage. This drew criticism from housing analysts, who argued that there is a housing shortage in Vancouver and that the party lacked a firm plan to deal with the issue.

== Election results ==
Mayoral
Year	Candidate	Votes	%	Position
2018	Wai Young	11,886	6.86	4th

Vancouver City Council
Year	Votes	%	Seats	+/–
2018	98,776	7.05	0 / 11	
