= Vancouver 1st =

- Defunct municipal party
- Leader: Fred Harding
- Founder: Jesse Johl
- Founded: 2013
- Dissolved: 2018
- Headquarters: 1275 West 6th Avenue, Vancouver
- Membership (2013): 1,000
- Ideology: Libertarian conservatism
- Political position: Right-wing
- Slogan: "Putting Vancouver First."

Website
- www.vancouver1st.ca

Vancouver 1st was a municipal political party in Vancouver, British Columbia. It supported the mayoral candidacy of Fred Harding, a retired West Vancouver police officer, in the 2018 municipal election.

== History ==
Vancouver 1st was founded in mid-2013 by Jesse Johl as a "pro-business, pro-development" anti-establishment municipal party. None of Vancouver 1st's 13 candidates won in the 2014 municipal election.

Fred Harding, Vancouver 1st's mayoral candidate for the 2018 municipal election, received 5,645 votes and placed 6th in the mayoral race. Fred Handing would later become the mayoral candidate for the Non-Partisan Association for the 2022 Vancouver municipal election, and Vancouver 1st would not participate.

== Ideology ==
Vancouver 1st claims to be a "big tent, libertarian-minded party" that prioritizes residents and taxpayers. The party advocates for lower taxes and small government.

Vancouver 1st does not support SOGI 123, a resource package made for teachers and school administrators to help avoid discrimination in their curriculum based on sexual orientation and gender identity (SOGI). This caused one of the party's school board candidates, Tony Dong, to quit the party a week before the 2018 municipal election.

== Platform ==
=== 2014 ===
For the 2014 municipal election, Vancouver 1st's party platform included, among other things:

- Lowering taxes on homeowners and small businesses
- Creating a "public advocate office" and a lobbyist registry
- Allowing public access to books held by city hall and giving line by line accounting
- Increasing funding for community centres and constructing a seniors centre in every neighbourhood
- Providing a thousand more daycare and preschool spaces
- Constructing more public playgrounds and revitalizing public pools
- Increasing funding for the fire and police departments
- Expanding community policing

=== 2018 ===
In October 2018, Vancouver 1st promised to negotiate the return of the Vancouver Grizzlies and construct a "world class" NBA stadium in southern Vancouver. The party also promised to get Vancouver a franchise spot in the MLB and construct an MLB stadium in the same area as the NBA stadium. Additionally, Vancouver 1st said it would reverse a decision made by the provincial government in early 2018 to exclude Vancouver from the 2026 FIFA World Cup.

== Electoral results ==
Mayoral
Election year	Candidate	Votes	%	Position	Result
2014	None	N/A	N/A	N/A	Did not contest
2018	Fred Harding	5,645	3.25	6th	Not elected

Vancouver City Council
Election year	Votes	%	Seats	+/–
2014	45,508	–	0 / 11	
2018	80,855	5.79	0 / 11	Steady
