= Suzanne Anton =

Canadian politician (born 1952)

Suzanne Anton KC
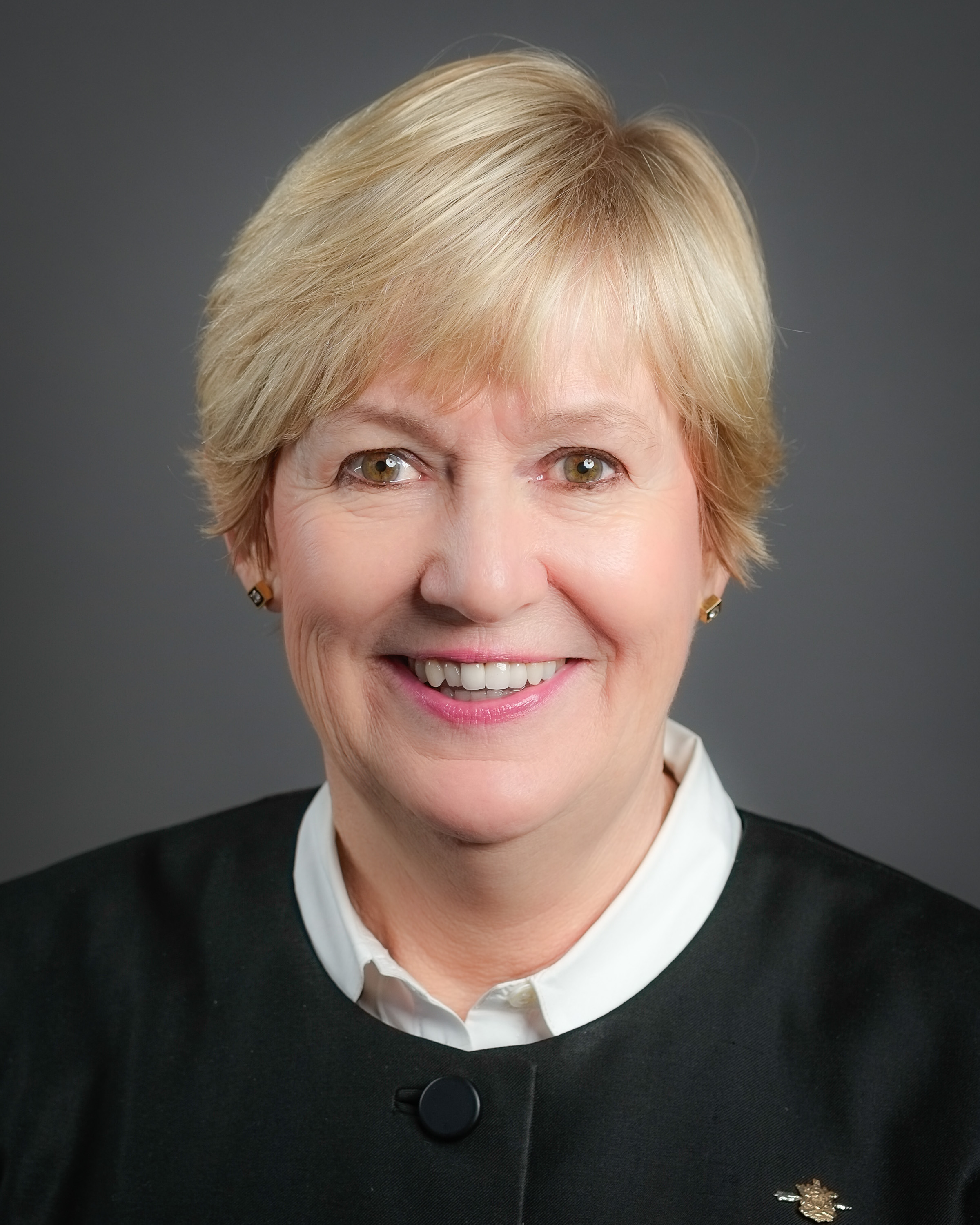
- Official portrait, 2013

Attorney General of British Columbia
- In office June 10, 2013 – June 12, 2017
- Premier: Christy Clark
- Preceded by: Shirley Bond
- Succeeded by: Andrew Wilkinson

Member of the British Columbia Legislative Assembly for Vancouver-Fraserview
- In office May 13, 2013 – May 9, 2017
- Preceded by: Kash Heed
- Succeeded by: George Chow

Personal details
- Born: May 31, 1952 (age 74)
- Party: BC Liberal (provincial); Non-Partisan Association (municipal)
- Profession: Lawyer, schoolteacher, politician

Suzanne Anton, KC (born May 31, 1952) is a Canadian politician and the former Minister of Justice and Attorney General of British Columbia. Elected to the Legislative Assembly of British Columbia in the 2013 provincial election, Anton represented the riding of Vancouver-Fraserview as a member of the British Columbia Liberal Party, following a career at the municipal level. She was appointed British Columbia's Attorney General and Minister of Justice on June 10, 2013.

Prior to her political involvement, Anton was a lawyer and former prosecutor with the Criminal Justice Branch of British Columbia. She was defeated in the 2017 provincial election by George Chow.

Anton co-lead the 2018 successful "no pro-rep" side, campaigning to maintain the current "first-past-the-post" electoral system in BC with Bill Tieleman and Bob Plecas.

== Attorney General of British Columbia ==
=== Crime Victim Assistance Program ===
Anton has made public statements in regards to the murder of Maple Batalia, a Simon Fraser University student murdered in 2011, whose alleged murderer has been charged but still not tried as of 2015. The trial is expected to resume in January 2016.

Anton has stated that the pre-trial delay must be very difficult for to the Batalia family. She said the British Columbia government is committed to supporting families through the Crime Victim Assistance Program which provides financial benefits to help people recover from the impacts of victimization. She said that Crown counsel do their best to advance cases promptly and provide the accused with a fair and timely trial.

== Background ==
Born in Duncan, British Columbia, Anton graduated from Queen Margaret's School in 1970 and went on to receive her Bachelor of Science in mathematics from the University of Victoria. She went on to complete her Bachelor of Law from the University of British Columbia in 1979.

Prior to her career in politics, Suzanne Anton was a mathematics teacher at the Carlucci American International School of Lisbon in Portugal, and through Canadian University Service Overseas in Nigeria. She was also a Crown Counsel lawyer. She served with many organizations including the Vancouver Sport Tourism Task Force; MoreSports (founding member); ARKS (Arbutus Ridge Kerrisdale Shaughnessy) CityPlan Visioning community liaison group; Vancouver City Planning Commission; Rick Hansen Wheels in Motion Vancouver event; Kerrisdale Soccer Club (past president); Vancouver Field Sport Federation (past vice-president); Achilles Track Society; and Riley Park community association.

== Vancouver City Council ==
In 2002, Anton was elected to the Vancouver Park Board and served a single term. Anton was elected to Vancouver City Council in 2005, to which she was re-elected in 2008. During that time, Anton served on the Board of Directors for the B.C. Pavilion Corporation (PavCo), the Vancouver Symphony Orchestra, the BC Sports Hall of Fame, the 2011 Grey Cup committee and the Vancouver 125 committee.

While in municipal government, Anton served as the Vancouver director for the Federation of Canadian Municipalities, where she was the vice chair of the committee to Increase Women's Participation in Municipal Government and sat on the Governance Review Committee. As a Director of Metro Vancouver, Anton was a member of the Waste Management Committee, the Land Use and Transportation Committee, and the UBC/Metro Vancouver joint committee. Anton served as the Vancouver director on Translink during the initial construction of the Canada Line. While there, she also served on the audit committee. Anton has served on numerous community and sport boards.

In addition to this, Anton served as the vice-chair of the city's Planning and Environment Committee and a member of the Heritage Commission. At the Metro Vancouver level, she was a member of the Land Use and Transportation Committee and the Vancouver/UBC Joint Committee, where she was the lead on the issue of University of British Columbia governance.

In Vancouver's 2011 municipal election, Anton was the Non-Partisan Association's candidate for Mayor of Vancouver, eventually losing to incumbent Gregor Robertson of Vision Vancouver.

In her time on Vancouver City Council, Anton has also sat on the boards of TransLink, Metro Vancouver, and the Federation of Canadian Municipalities. She has been vice-chair of the city's Planning and Environment Committee and a member of the Heritage Commission. At the Metro Vancouver level, she was a member of the Land Use and Transportation Committee and the Vancouver/UBC Joint Committee, where she was the lead on the issue of University of British Columbia governance.

== Personal life ==
Anton and her husband Olin have three adult children.

== Electoral record ==
=== Provincial elections ===
2017 British Columbia general election: Vancouver-Fraserview
Party	Candidate	Votes	%	±%	Expenditures
New Democratic	George Chow	11,487	48.57	+4.01	$68,196
Liberal	Suzanne Anton	9,985	42.22	-4.52	$69,911
Green	Eric Kolotyluk	1,826	7.72	+2.04	$2,357
Libertarian	Hiroshi Hyde	179	0.76	–	$56
Your Political Party	Harpreet S. Bajwa	174	0.73	–	$8,399
Total valid votes		23,651	100.00	–	
Total rejected ballots		252	1.05	-0.1	
Turnout		23,903	60.55	+5.59	
Registered voters		39,479			
Source: Elections BC

2013 British Columbia general election: Vancouver-Fraserview
Party	Candidate	Votes	%
Liberal	Suzanne Anton	10118	46.74
New Democratic	Gabriel Yiu	9648	44.57
Green	Stuart Mackinnon	1230	5.68
Conservative	Rajiv Pandey	653	3.02
Total valid votes		21649	100.00
Total rejected ballots		251	1.15
Turnout		21900	54.96
Source: Elections BC

=== Municipal elections ===
2011 Vancouver Mayoral Election

Candidate Name	Party affiliation	Votes	% of votes	Elected
(I) Gregor Robertson	Vision Vancouver	77,005	53.17%	X
Suzanne Anton	Non-Partisan Association	58,152	40.15%	
Randy Helten	Neighbourhoods for a Sustainable Vancouver	4,007	2.77%	
Gerry McGuire	Vancouver Citizen's Voice	1,195	0.83%	
Sam Pelletier	Independent	443	0.31%	
Darrell Zimmerman	Independent	426	0.29%	
Dubgee	Independent	419	0.29%	
Robin Lawrance	Independent	353	0.24%	
Victor B. Paquette	Independent	333	0.23%	
Lloyd Alan Cooke	Independent	310	0.21%	
Menard Caissy	Independent	288	0.20%	
Gölök Zoltán Buday	Independent	268	0.19%	

2008 Vancouver Municipal Election – City Council

Candidate Name	Party Affiliation	Votes	% of Votes	Elected
(I) Raymond Louie	Vision Vancouver	66,226	53.29%	X
(I) Heather Deal	Vision Vancouver	63,116	50.78%	X
(I) George Chow	Vision Vancouver	62,262	50.10%	X
Kerry Jang	Vision Vancouver	60,598	48.76%	X
Andrea Reimer	Vision Vancouver	59,148	47.59%	X
(I) Tim Stevenson	Vision Vancouver	58,380	46.97%	X
(I) David Cadman	Coalition of Progressive Electors	56,665	45.59%	X
(I) Suzanne Anton	Non-Partisan Association	52,941	42.60%	X
Geoff Meggs	Vision Vancouver	49,538	39.86%	X
Ellen Woodsworth	Coalition of Progressive Electors	45,877	36.91%	X
Kashmir Dhaliwal	Vision Vancouver	44,854	36.09%	
Michael Geller	Non-Partisan Association	44,353	35.69%	
(I) Kim Capri	Non-Partisan Association	44,270	35.62%	
(I) Elizabeth Ball	Non-Partisan Association	42,727	34.38%	
David Lee	Non-Partisan Association	42,195	33.95%	
Kanman Wong	Non-Partisan Association	36,795	29.61%	
Korina Houghton	Non-Partisan Association	34,588	27.83%	
Leanore Copeland	Non-Partisan Association	34,566	27.81%	
Sean Bickerton	Non-Partisan Association	33,510	26.96%	
Daljit S. Sidhu	Non-Partisan Association	28,894	23.25%	
Chris Shaw	Work Less Party of British Columbia	11,237	9.04%	
Lea Johnson	Independent	10,947	8.81%	
Ian Gregson	Work Less Party of British Columbia	10,493	8.44%	
Geri Tramutola	Work Less Party of British Columbia	8,619	6.93%	
John T. Boychuk	Independent	8,093	6.51%	
Timothy Wisdom	Work Less Party of British Columbia	7,435	5.98%	
Marc Boyer	Independent	4,305	3.46%	
Audrey Jane Laferriere	Independent	4,196	3.38%	
Wendythirteen	Independent	3,508	2.82%	
Steve Wansleeben	Independent	3,299	2.65%	
Bud Oracle	Independent	2,860	2.30%	
Matt Kadioglu	Independent	2,423	1.95%	

2005 Vancouver Municipal Election – City Council

Candidate	Party	Votes	%
Suzanne Anton	NPA	60586	
Peter Ladner*	NPA	58142	
Raymond Louie*	Vision	52795	
Kim Capri	NPA	52719	
Tim Stevenson*	Vision	51527	
David Cadman*	COPE	51155	
George Chow	Vision	51107	
Elizabeth Ball	NPA	50865	
Heather Deal	Vision	50624	
B.C. Lee	NPA	50047	
Ronald Leung	NPA	48430	
Fred Bass*	COPE	48248	
Colleen Hardwick Nystedt	NPA	46737	
Valerie Jenkinson	NPA	46077	
Heather Harrison	Vision	45719	
Kathi Thompson	NPA	45314	
Tim Louis*	COPE	43349	
Ellen Woodsworth*	COPE	42724	
Anne Roberts*	COPE	41739	
Patrick Maliha	NPA	39165	
Ann Livingston	Green	27168	
Kevin Potvin	Independent	10806	
Michelle Jasmine Chang	Independent	9016	
Jamie Lee Hamilton	Independent	8153	
Patrick Britten	Nude Garden	6595	
Lea Johnson	Independent	6253	
Beverley Ballantyne	Independent	6153	
John W. Angus	Independent	5728	
Wendythirteen	Independent	4247	
John Patrick Gordon	Independent	3887	
Phyllis Loke	Independent	3562	
Marc Boyer	Independent	3388	
Greg Aulin	Independent	3335	
Don Briere	Independent	3125	
David Wilson Applegath	Independent	2718	
Steve Wansleeben	Independent	2478	
Total		1083681	100.0

British Columbia provincial government of Christy Clark
Cabinet post (1)
Predecessor	Office	Successor
Shirley Bond	Attorney General of British Columbia; June 10, 2013 – June 12, 2017	Andrew Wilkinson
