= 2005 Vancouver municipal election =

Local election in Canada

- November 19, 2005

11 seats in Vancouver City Council
- Turnout: 32.4% ▼15.9 pp
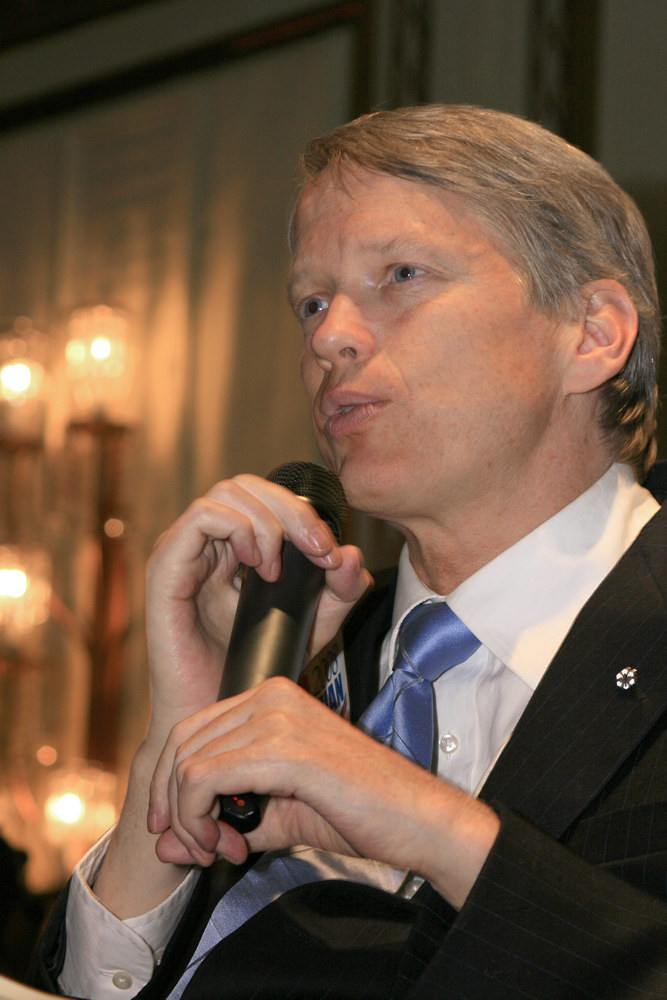

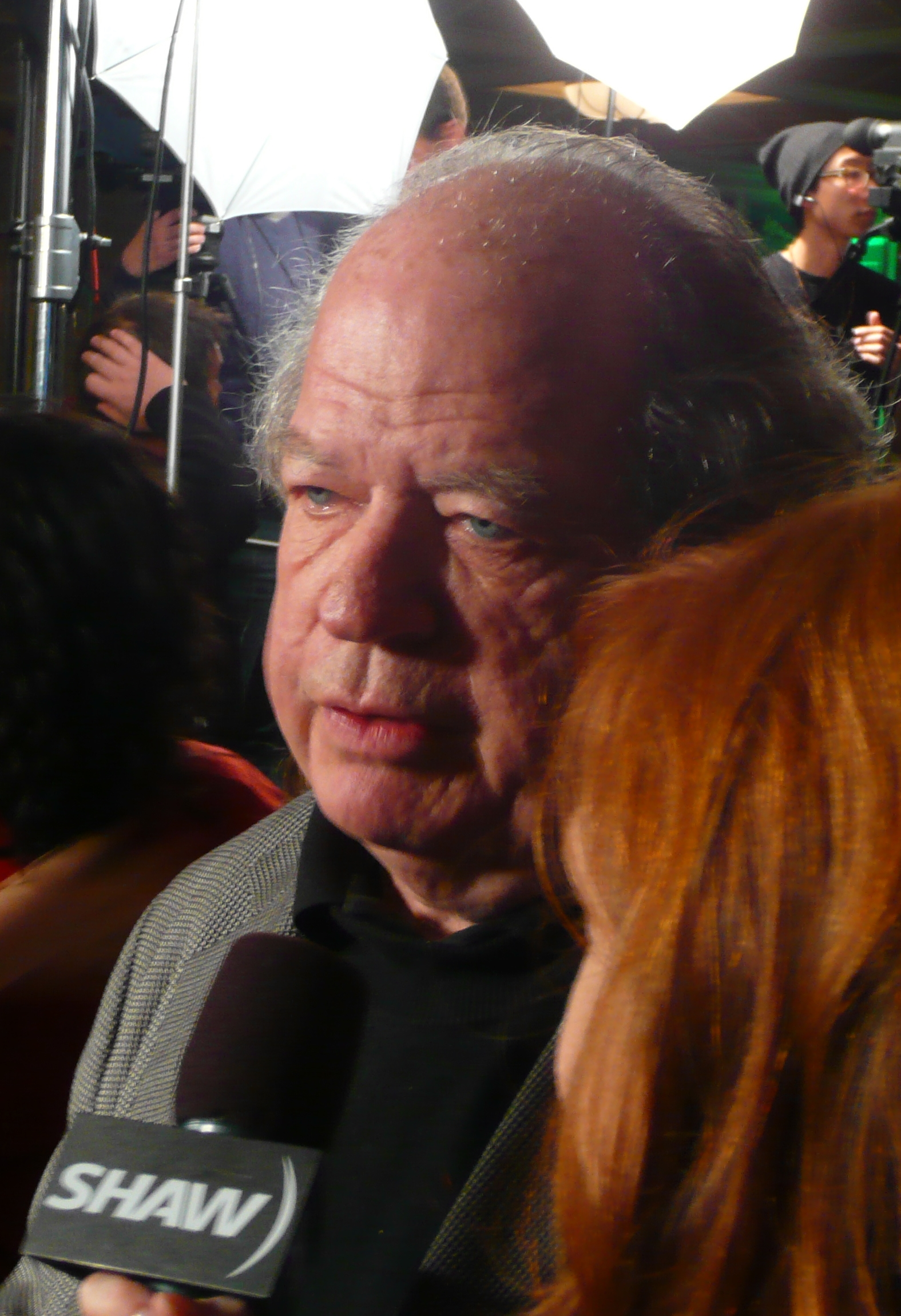

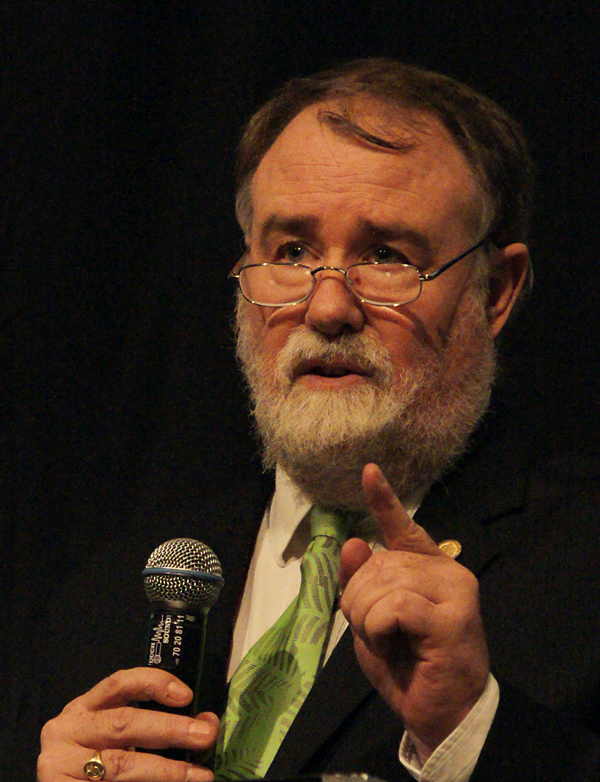
	First party	Second party	Third party
Leader	Sam Sullivan	Jim Green	David Cadman (de facto)
Party	NPA	Vision	COPE
Leader since	2005	2005	2005
Leader's seat	Mayor	Ran for Mayor (lost)	Councillor
Last election	2 seats, 30.01%	N/A (4 at dissolution)	9 seats (5 at dissolution), 57.79%
Seats won	6	4	1
Seat change	▲4	Steady	▼4
Popular vote	61,543	57,796	N/A
Percentage	47.34%	44.45%	N/A
Swing	▲17.33%	▼13.34% (from COPE 2002 results)	N/A
- Mayoral results by voting division
Mayor before election
Larry Campbell
COPE
Elected mayor
Sam Sullivan
NPA

The city of Vancouver, along with the rest of British Columbia's municipalities, held its municipal elections on November 19, 2005.

That day voters elected one mayor, 10 councillors, nine school board trustees and seven park board commissioners. Plurality block voting was used, so each elector could vote for as many candidates as there were open seats. For example, an elector could vote for as many as ten candidates in the election of councillors.

== Elections to city council ==
=== Overall council results ===
All figures include votes cast for both mayor and councillors

Party	Party leader or mayoral candidate	# of candidates	Council seats				Total popular vote		
Party	Party leader or mayoral candidate	# of candidates	2002	At dissolution	Elected	Change	#	%	Change
NPA	Sam Sullivan	11	2	2	6	+4			
Vision	Jim Green	6	-	4	4	0			
COPE	David Cadman	5	9	5	1	-4			
Work Less	Ben West	1	-	-	-				
Interest	Austin Spencer	1	-	-	-				
Green	none	1	-	-					
Nude Garden	Patrick Britten	1	-	-	-				
Independent		30	-	-	-				
Total		56	11	11	11	-		100.0	-

=== Mayoral election ===
One to be elected.

2005 Vancouver municipal election: Mayor
Party	Candidate	Votes	%	Elected
NPA	Sam Sullivan	61,543	47.34	✓
Vision	Jim Green	57,796	44.45	
Independent	James Green	4,273	3.29	
Work Less	Ben West	1,907	1.47	
Independent	Scott Yee	688	0.53	
Interest	Austin Spencer	456	0.35	
Independent	Pedro Mora	443	0.34	
Independent	Gölök Zoltán Buday	384	0.30	
Independent	John Landry Gray	355	0.27	
Independent	Mike Hansen	304	0.23	
Independent	Darrell Zimmerman	283	0.22	
Independent	Frank D'Agostino	275	0.21	
Independent	Ian W. Simpson	246	0.19	
Independent	Arthur Crossman	219	0.17	
Independent	Grant Chancey	198	0.15	
Independent	Ray Power	171	0.13	
Independent	Peter Raymond Haskell	144	0.11	
Independent	Malcolm G. MacLeod	140	0.11	
Independent	Joe Hatoum	96	0.07	
Independent	Eliot Esti	90	0.07	
Total votes		130,011	100.00	
NPA gain from COPE		Swing		–

=== Councillor election ===
Ten to be elected.

Candidate	Party	Votes	%
Suzanne Anton	NPA	60586	
Peter Ladner*	NPA	58142	
Raymond Louie*	Vision	52795	
Kim Capri	NPA	52719	
Tim Stevenson*	Vision	51527	
David Cadman*	COPE	51155	
George Chow	Vision	51107	
Elizabeth Ball	NPA	50865	
Heather Deal	Vision	50624	
BC Lee	NPA	50047	
Ronald Leung	NPA	48430	
Fred Bass*	COPE	48248	
Colleen Hardwick Nystedt	NPA	46737	
Valerie Jenkinson	NPA	46077	
Heather Harrison	Vision	45719	
Kathi Thompson	NPA	45314	
Tim Louis*	COPE	43349	
Ellen Woodsworth*	COPE	42724	
Anne Roberts*	COPE	41739	
Patrick Maliha	NPA	39165	
Ann Livingston	Green	27168	
Kevin Potvin	Independent	10806	
Michelle Jasmine Chang	Independent	9016	
Jamie Lee Hamilton	Independent	8153	
Patrick Britten	Nude Garden	6595	
Lea Johnson	Independent	6253	
Beverley Ballantyne	Independent	6153	
John W. Angus	Independent	5728	
Wendythirteen	Independent	4247	
John Patrick Gordon	Independent	3887	
Phyllis Loke	Independent	3562	
Marc Boyer	Independent	3388	
Greg Aulin	Independent	3335	
Don Briere	Independent	3125	
David Wilson Applegath	Independent	2718	
Steve Wansleeben	Independent	2478	
Total		1083681	100.0

== Elections to the park board ==
Seven to be elected.

Candidate	Party	Votes	%
Allan De Genova*	NPA	59961	
Heather Holden	NPA	57229	
Ian Robertson	NPA	53700	
Marty Zlotnik	NPA	51363	
Korina Houghton	NPA	46309	
Loretta Woodcock*	COPE	45659	
Spencer Herbert	COPE	44562	
Sheryl Williamson-Harms	NPA	43898	
Eric Whiteway	NPA	43851	
Mel Lehan	COPE	43684	
Anita Romaniuk*	COPE	43078	
Jenn McGinn	COPE	39738	
Omar Kassis	COPE	38551	
Stuart Mackinnon	Green	37824	
Tracey Jastinder Mann	Green	33384	
Bill Grant	Independent	10819	
Juliet V. Andalis	Independent	9966	
Earl P. Sunshine	Independent	8610	
Ashok Sarkar	Independent	4791	
Total			100.0

== Elections to the school board ==
Nine to be elected.

Candidate	Party	Votes	%
Carol Gibson	NPA	55356	
Don Lee	NPA	54868	
Shirley M. Wong	NPA	54259	
Ken Denike	NPA	52908	
Allen Blakey*	COPE	51444	
Allan Wong*	COPE	50380	
Eleanor Gregory	NPA	49473	
Sharon Gregson	COPE	48293	
Clarence Hansen	NPA	48162	
Jane Bouey*	COPE	47876	
Angela Kenyon*	COPE	46458	
Noel Herron*	COPE	46072	
Michelle Mollineaux	NPA	45940	
Andrea Reimer*	Green	44476	
Kevin Millsip*	COPE	43527	
Rucku Bhandal	NPA	43288	
Conrad Lew	COPE	42452	
Todd Gnissios	NPA	41341	
Herman Hui	Independent	10966	
Leo Jack Ferry	Independent	8537	
Bang Nguyen	Independent	7525	
Total			100.0

== See also ==
- 2008 Vancouver municipal election
