= 2002 Vancouver municipal election =

Canadian local election

- November 16, 2002

11 seats in Vancouver City Council
- Turnout: 50.1% ▲13.3 pp
	First party	Second party
		NPA
Leader	Larry Campbell	Jennifer Clarke
Party	COPE	NPA
Leader since	2002
Leader's seat	Mayor	Ran for Mayor (lost)
Last election	2 seats, 35.54%	9 seats, 54.19%
Seats won	9	2
Seat change	▲7	▼7
Popular vote	80,772	41,936
Percentage	57.79%	30.01%
- Mayoral results by voting division
Mayor before election
Philip Owen
NPA
Elected mayor
Larry Campbell
COPE

The Coalition of Progressive Electors (COPE) swept the 2002 Vancouver municipal election, winning eight of ten council seats, seven of nine school board seats and five of seven park board seats. The Non-Partisan Association (NPA) was reduced to two council seats, one school board seat and two park board seats. The Green Party of Vancouver won one school board seat.

In the race for mayor, the COPE's Larry Campbell defeated Jennifer Clarke of the NPA by a margin of 58% to 30%.

== Candidates and results ==
=== Mayor ===
There were 16 candidates seeking election to the position of mayor. Five were affiliated with a political party and eleven were independent. COPE candidate Larry Campbell was elected.

Candidate name	Party affiliation	Votes	% of votes	Elected
Larry Campbell	Coalition of Progressive Electors	80,772	57.79%	X
Jennifer Clarke	Non-Partisan Association	41,936	30.01%	
Valerie Maclean	Vancouver Civic Action Team	7,843	5.61%	
Raymond Chang	Independent	2,777	1.99%	
Marc Emery	Vancouver Marijuana Party	2,014	1.44%	
Ndyabagyera Anatoli	Independent	426	0.30%	
Thomas Reekie	Vancouver Independent Progressives	353	0.25%	
Dave Carson	Independent	348	0.25%	
Beverly Bernardo	Independent	279	0.20%	
Frank N. D'Agostino	Independent	254	0.18%	
Gölök Buday	Independent	222	0.16%	
Patrick Britten	Independent	188	0.13%	
André Paris	Independent	133	0.10%	
M. G. MacLeod	Independent	131	0.09%	
Ben Krakowsky	Independent	126	0.09%	
Trina Ferguson	Independent	105	0.08%	

=== Councillors ===
From a field of 46 candidates, 10 councillors were elected to Vancouver City Council. Of those, 35 were affiliated with a political party and 11 were independent. Eight COPE councillors and two NPA councillors were elected.

Candidate name	Party Affiliation	Votes	% of Votes	Elected
Fred Bass	Coalition of Progressive Electors	70,525	50.46%	X
Jim Green	Coalition of Progressive Electors	67,841	48.54%	X
David Cadman	Coalition of Progressive Electors	66,805	47.80%	X
Tim Louis	Coalition of Progressive Electors	66,348	47.47%	X
Tim Stevenson	Coalition of Progressive Electors	57,901	41.43%	X
Anne Roberts	Coalition of Progressive Electors	55,685	39.84%	X
Raymond Louie	Coalition of Progressive Electors	55,605	39.79%	X
Ellen Woodsworth	Coalition of Progressive Electors	53,388	38.20%	X
Peter Ladner	Non-Partisan Association	41,755	29.88%	X
Sam Sullivan	Non-Partisan Association	40,372	28.89%	X
B. C. Lee	Non-Partisan Association	39,868	28.53%	
Don Lee	Non-Partisan Association	38,225	28.07%	
Duncan Wilson	Non-Partisan Association	38,692	27.68%	
Cheryl Chang	Non-Partisan Association	38,633	27.64%	
Vern Campbell	Non-Partisan Association	35,731	25.57%	
George Puil	Non-Partisan Association	32,318	23.12%	
Sandy McCormick	Non-Partisan Association	32,042	22.93%	
Nancy A. Chiavario	Vancouver Civic Action Team	30,853	22.08%	
Janet Leduc	Non-Partisan Association	30,432	21.77%	
Connie Fogal-Rankin	Green Party of Vancouver	30,305	21.68%	
Richard Campbell	Green Party of Vancouver	23,599	16.89%	
Doug Warkentin	Green Party of Vancouver	20,510	14.68%	
Art Cowie	Vancouver Civic Action Team	18,535	13.26%	
George Chow	Independent	17,849	12.77%	
Alan Herbert	Vancouver Civic Action Team	16,397	11.73%	
Stephen Rogers	Vancouver Civic Action Team	12,759	9.13%	
Sarah Albertson	Dance Party Party	11,132	7.97%	
Wendy Turner	Vancouver Civic Action Team	10,669	7.63%	
Constantine Bonnis	Vancouver Civic Action Team	9,785	7.00%	
Brent Bazinet	Vancouver Civic Action Team	8,356	5.98%	
Scott Yee	Independent	8,053	5.76%	
Lou Demerais	Vancouver Civic Action Team	7,805	5.58%	
Jon Ellis	Vancouver Civic Action Team	7,615	5.45%	
Ryan Millar	Dance Party Party	6,086	4.35%	
Barney Hickey	Vancouver Civic Action Team	5,121	3.66%	
Patricia Lovick	Vancouver Independent Progressives	4,787	3.43%	
Brian Godzilla Salmi	Independent	4,631	3.31%	
Roslyn Cassells	Independent	4,511	3.23%	
Kelly Alm	Independent	3,793	2.71%	
Devinder "Vicky" Jassal	Independent	3,698	2.81%	
Nick A. Walter	Vancouver Independent Progressives	3,376	2.42%	
Ken Bregman	Independent	2,938	2.10%	
Greg Reid	Independent	2,648	1.89%	
Joan Rowntree	Independent	2,561	1.83%	
Carlo Fortugno	Independent	2,043	1.46%	
Kyle A. Cunningham	Independent	1,938	1.39%	

=== Park commissioners ===
From 33 candidates, 7 commissioners were elected to the Vancouver Park Board. Of the candidates, 20 were affiliated with a political party and 13 were independent. Five COPE commissioners and two NPA commissioners were elected.

Candidate name	Party Affiliation	Votes	% of Votes	Elected
Heather Deal	Coalition of Progressive Electors	60,873	43.56%	X
Loretta Woodcock	Coalition of Progressive Electors	54,955	39.32%	X
Anita Romaniuk	Coalition of Progressive Electors	53,112	38.00%	X
Lyndsay Poaps	Coalition of Progressive Electors	51,571	36.90%	X
Eva Riccius	Coalition of Progressive Electors	48,298	34.56%	X
Suzanne Anton	Non-Partisan Association	41,338	29.58%	X
Allan De Genova	Non-Partisan Association	41,249	29.51%	X
Dianne Ledingham	Non-Partisan Association	36,995	26.47%	
Clarence Hansen	Non-Partisan Association	33,374	23.88%	
Laura McDiarmid	Non-Partisan Association	33,069	23.66%	
Catherine Carter	Green Party of Vancouver	32,613	23.33%	
James Love	Green Party of Vancouver	31,392	22.46%	
Ian Haywood-Farmer	Non-Partisan Association	30,146	21.57%	
Christopher J. K. Richardson	Non-Partisan Association	29,875	21.57%	
Dawn Buie	Green Party of Vancouver	28,694	20.53%	
Scott Braithwaite-Nelson	Green Party of Vancouver	25,887	18.52%	
Kelly Wong	Vancouver Civic Action Team	18,925	13.54%	
Raymond Eng	Independent	11,132	7.97%	
Kristina Parusel	Vancouver Civic Action Team	11,075	7.92%	
Erik Whiteway	Vancouver Civic Action Team	9,447	6.76%	
Dave A. Pasin	Vancouver Civic Action Team	8,949	6.40%	
Helen D. Boyce	Independent	8,725	6.24%	
Gordon Kennedy	Independent	6,345	4.54%	
Matthew Sullivan	Independent	4,090	2.93%	
Greg Edgelow	Independent	3,399	2.43%	
Eleanor Lena Hadley	Independent	3,362	2.41%	
Angus Carten	Independent	3,126	2.24%	
Korina Houghton	Independent	3,097	2.22%	
A. Pepper	Independent	2,532	1.81%	
Douglas Weisberg	Independent	2,396	1.71%	
Thomas E. Deak	Independent	2,349	1.68%	
Joseph Paithouski	Independent	1,828	1.31%	
Bobus Undem	Independent	1,360	0.97%	

=== School trustees ===
From 23 candidates, 9 school trustees were elected to the Vancouver School Board. Of the candidates, 18 were affiliated with a political party and 5 were independent. Five COPE trustees, one NPA trustee, and one Green trustee were elected.

Candidate name	Party Affiliation	Votes	% of Votes	Elected
Allen Blakey	Coalition of Progressive Electors	70,455	50.21%	X
Allan Wong	Coalition of Progressive Electors	65,758	46.86%	X
Jane Bouey	Coalition of Progressive Electors	65,509	46.68%	X
Noel Herron	Coalition of Progressive Electors	63,607	45.33%	X
Adrienne Montani	Coalition of Progressive Electors	62,533	44.56%	X
Angela Kenyon	Coalition of Progressive Electors	60,342	43.00%	X
Kevin Millsip	Coalition of Progressive Electors	57,669	41.09%	X
John Cheng	Non-Partisan Association	45,984	32.77%	X
Andrea Reimer	Green Party of Vancouver	44,951	32.03%	X
Richard Lee	Non-Partisan Association	44,810	31.93%	
Ken Denike	Non-Partisan Association	43,542	31.03%	
Judy Johnstone	Green Party of Vancouver	41,907	29.86%	
Bill Brown	Non-Partisan Association	41,492	29.57%	
Ted Hunt	Non-Partisan Association	41,137	29.31%	
Cherie Payne	Non-Partisan Association	38,155	27.19%	
Elyn Dobbs	Non-Partisan Association	34,776	24.78%	
Debbie Desroches-Fulton	Non-Partisan Association	32,150	22.91%	
Angelle Desrochers-Rosner	Non-Partisan Association	28,813	20.53%	
Bill Ritchie	Independent	9,946	7.09%	
Brian Godzilla Salmi	Independent	7,802	5.56%	
Tea Buechner	Independent	7,421	5.29%	
Ringo Taylhardat	Independent	4,240	3.02%	
Keir Vichert	Independent	4,098	2.92%	
