= 2008 Vancouver municipal election =

Canadian local election

- November 15, 2008

11 seats in Vancouver City Council
- Turnout: 30.8% ▼1.6 pp
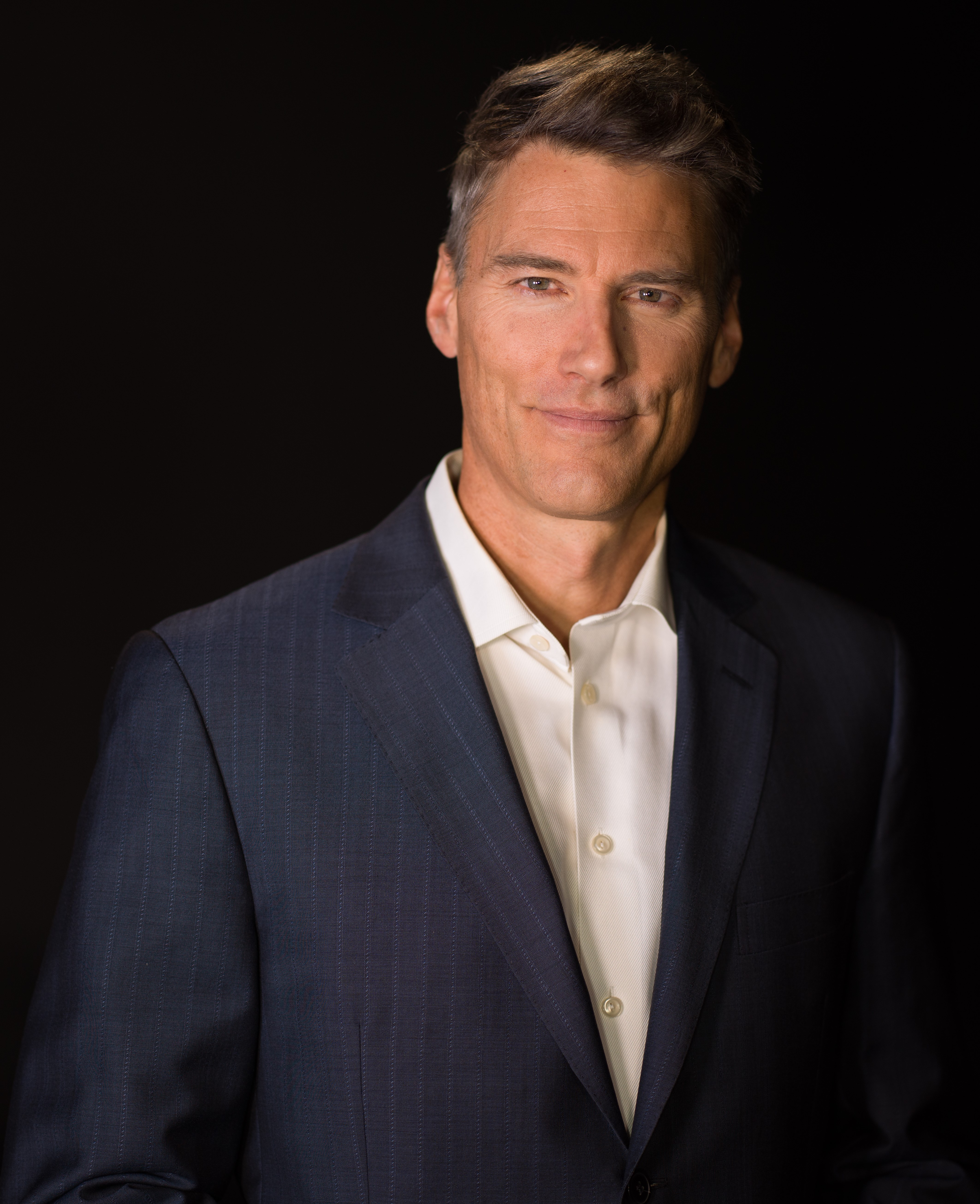

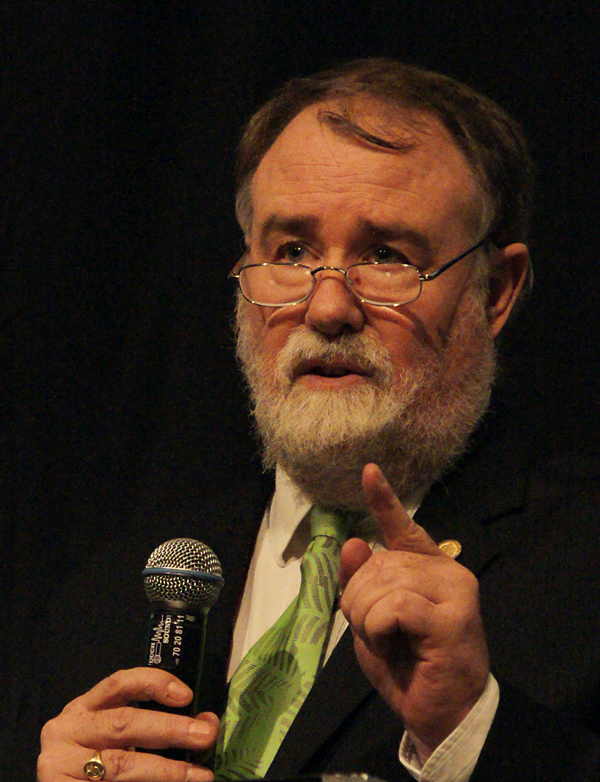

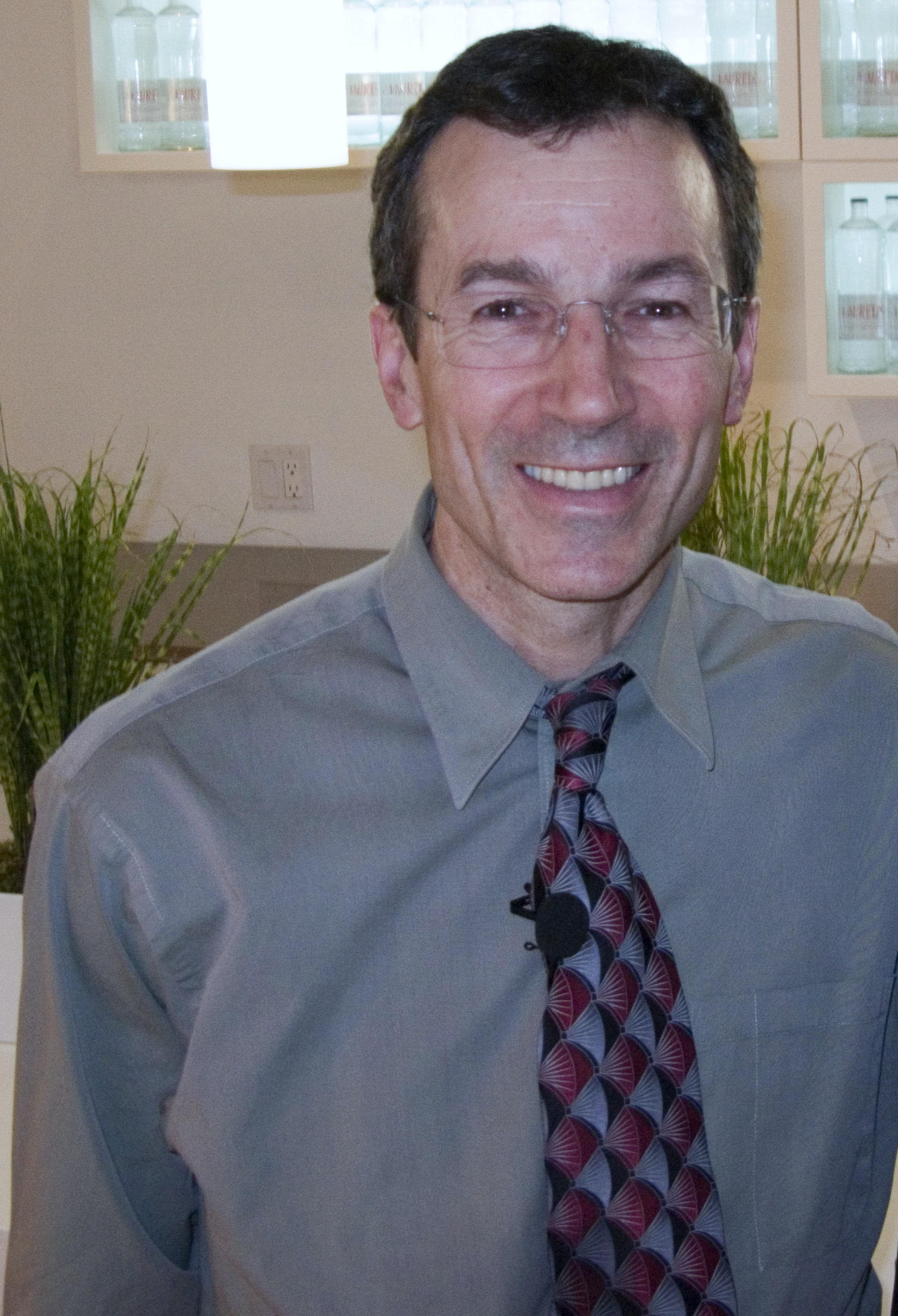
	First party	Second party	Third party
Leader	Gregor Robertson	David Cadman (de facto)	Peter Ladner
Party	Vision	COPE	NPA
Alliance	Vision–COPE–Green	Vision–COPE–Green
Leader since	June 2008	2005	2008
Leader's seat	Mayor	Councillor	Ran for Mayor (lost)
Last election	4 seats, 44.45%	1 seat, N/A	6 seats, 47.34%
Seats won	8	2	1
Seat change	▲4	▲1	▼5
Popular vote	67,598	N/A	48,794
Percentage	54.39%	N/A	39.26%
Swing	▲9.94%	N/A	▼8.08%
- Mayoral results by voting division
Mayor before election
Sam Sullivan
NPA
Elected mayor
Gregor Robertson
Vision

The 2008 Vancouver municipal election was held on November 15, 2008, filling seats on the Vancouver School Board, the Park Board, the Vancouver City Council, and the position of Mayor of Vancouver. It was held at the same time as municipal elections throughout the province. Three major civic parties were represented: the Coalition of Progressive Electors, the Non-Partisan Association, and Vision Vancouver. The Green Party of Vancouver fielded one candidate for park board commissioner.

== Candidates and results ==
All incumbents are marked with (I) before their names.

=== Mayor ===
One mayor was elected out of 15 candidates. Of the candidates, four were affiliated with a political party, and eleven were independent. Gregor Robertson of Vision Vancouver was elected.

Candidate name	Party affiliation	Votes	% of votes	Elected
Gregor Robertson	Vision Vancouver	67,598	54.39%	X
Peter Ladner	Non-Partisan Association	48,794	39.26%	
Betty Krawczyk	Work Less Party of British Columbia	1,346	1.08%	
Marc Emery	Independent	1,119	0.90%	
Scott Yee	Independent	942	0.31%	
Patrick Britten	Nude Garden Party	695	0.76%	
Jeff Kuah	Independent	600	0.48%	
Angel L. Jimenez	Independent	320	0.26%	
Leon Kaplan	Independent	299	0.24%	
Bill Ritchie	Independent	252	0.20%	
Joe Hatoum	Independent	241	0.19%	
Gölök Z. Buday	Independent	172	0.14%	
Menard D. Caissey	Independent	137	0.11%	
N. Bur Maxwell	Independent	125	0.10%	

=== City councillors ===
Ten councillors were elected out of 32 candidates. Of the candidates, 24 were affiliated with a political party, and 8 were independent. Eight incumbent councillors were seeking re-election: four from Vision Vancouver, three from the NPA, and one from COPE. Of the elected councillors, seven were from Vision Vancouver, two from COPE and one from the NPA.

Candidate name	Party affiliation	Votes	% of votes	Elected
(I) Raymond Louie	Vision Vancouver	66,226	53.29%	X
(I) Heather Deal	Vision Vancouver	63,116	50.78%	X
(I) George Chow	Vision Vancouver	62,262	50.10%	X
Kerry Jang	Vision Vancouver	60,598	48.76%	X
Andrea Reimer	Vision Vancouver	59,148	47.59%	X
(I) Tim Stevenson	Vision Vancouver	58,380	46.97%	X
(I) David Cadman	Coalition of Progressive Electors	56,665	45.59%	X
(I) Suzanne Anton	Non-Partisan Association	52,941	42.60%	X
Geoff Meggs	Vision Vancouver	49,538	39.86%	X
Ellen Woodsworth	Coalition of Progressive Electors	45,877	36.91%	X
Kashmir Dhaliwal	Vision Vancouver	44,854	36.09%	
Michael Geller	Non-Partisan Association	44,353	35.69%	
(I) Kim Capri	Non-Partisan Association	44,270	35.62%	
(I) Elizabeth Ball	Non-Partisan Association	42,727	34.38%	
David Lee	Non-Partisan Association	42,195	33.95%	
Kanman Wong	Non-Partisan Association	36,795	29.61%	
Korina Houghton	Non-Partisan Association	34,588	27.83%	
Leanore Copeland	Non-Partisan Association	34,566	27.81%	
Sean Bickerton	Non-Partisan Association	33,510	26.96%	
Daljit S. Sidhu	Non-Partisan Association	28,894	23.25%	
Chris Shaw	Work Less Party of British Columbia	11,237	9.04%	
Lea Johnson	Independent	10,947	8.81%	
Ian Gregson	Work Less Party of British Columbia	10,493	8.44%	
Geri Tramutola	Work Less Party of British Columbia	8,619	6.93%	
John T. Boychuk	Independent	8,093	6.51%	
Timothy Wisdom	Work Less Party of British Columbia	7,435	5.98%	
Marc Boyer	Independent	4,305	3.46%	
Audrey Jane Laferriere	Independent	4,196	3.38%	
Wendythirteen	Independent	3,508	2.82%	
Steve Wansleeben	Independent	3,299	2.65%	
Bud Oracle	Independent	2,860	2.30%	
Matt Kadioglu	Independent	2,423	1.95%	

=== Park board commissioners ===
Seven commissioners were elected out of twenty candidates. Of the candidates, 15 were affiliated with a political party, and 5 were independent. Two incumbent commissioners were seeking re-election: one from COPE and one from the NPA. Of the elected commissioners, four were from Vision Vancouver, with one each from the NPA, COPE, and the Green Party of Vancouver.

Candidate name	Party affiliation	Votes	% of votes	Elected
Constance Barnes	Vision Vancouver	62,973	50.67%	X
Aaron Jasper	Vision Vancouver	58,343	46.94%	X
Sarah Blyth	Vision Vancouver	56,775	45.68%	X
(I) Loretta Woodcock	Coalition of Progressive Electors	49,901	40.15%	X
Raj Hundal	Vision Vancouver	48,871	39.32%	X
Stuart MacKinnon	Green Party of Vancouver	48,415	38.95%	X
(I) Ian Robertson	Non-Partisan Association	44,005	35.41%	X
Anita Romaniuk	Coalition of Progressive Electors	43,636	35.11%	
Marty Zlotnik	Non-Partisan Association	42,633	34.30%	
Melissa De Genova	Non-Partisan Association	42,062	33.84%	
Laura McDiarmid	Non-Partisan Association	37,841	30.45%	
Christopher Richardson	Non-Partisan Association	35,849	28.84%	
Sharon Urton	Non-Partisan Association	33,129	26.66%	
Naresh Shukla	Non-Partisan Association	27,350	22.01%	
Jamie Lee Hamilton	Independent	15,405	12.39%	
Juliet Victoria Andalis	Independent	11,730	9.44%	
Richard Mayencourt	Independent	11,152	8.97%	
Ivan Dumenc	Work Less Party of British Columbia	10,919	8.79%	
Thomas Lockhart	Independent	6,832	5.50%	
Peter Raymond Haskell	Independent	5,674	4.57%	

=== School board trustees ===
Nine school trustees were elected out of 19 candidates. Of the candidates, 17 were affiliated with a political party, and 2 were independent. Five incumbent trustees were seeking re-election: three from the NPA and two from COPE. Of the elected trustees, four were from Vision Vancouver, three from COPE and two from NPA.

Candidate name	Party affiliation	Votes	% of votes	Elected
Patti Bacchus	Vision Vancouver	64,451	51.67%	X
Mike Lombardi	Vision Vancouver	62,772	50.32%	X
Ken Clement	Vision Vancouver	62,096	49.78%	X
Sharon E. Gregson	Vision Vancouver	61,417	49.24%	X
(I) Allan Wong	Coalition of Progressive Electors	56,027	44.92%	X
(I) Al Blakey	Coalition of Progressive Electors	49,045	39.32%	X
Jane Bouey	Coalition of Progressive Electors	48,227	38.66%	X
(I) Ken Denike	Non-Partisan Association	46,777	37.50%	X
(I) Carol Gibson	Non-Partisan Association	46,048	36.92%	X
Bill Bargeman	Coalition of Progressive Electors	45,981	36.86%	
Heather Holden	Non-Partisan Association	45,921	36.81%	
Alvin Singh	Coalition of Progressive Electors	43,754	35.08%	
Sophia Woo	Non-Partisan Association	43,538	34.90%	
(I) Clarence Hansen	Non-Partisan Association	40,953	32.83%	
Eileen Le Gallais	Non-Partisan Association	37,598	30.14%	
Margit Nance	Non-Partisan Association	35,014	28.07%	
Lakhbir Singh	Non-Partisan Association	33,659	26.98%	
Robert Allan Stark	Independent	10,914	8.75%	
Peter Raymond Haskell	Independent	10,370	8.31%	

=== Capital plan questions ===
The following capital plan questions were posed to voters:

==== Public works ====
1. Are you in favour of council having the authority, without further assent of the electors, to pass by-laws between January 1, 2009, and December 31, 2011, to borrow an aggregate $93,820,000 for the following purposes?

- Street and Bridge Infrastructure at $66,607,000
- Traffic and Safety Improvements at $12,553,000
- Street Lighting, Traffic Signal, and Communications Systems at $14,660,000

Option	Votes	Percentage
Yes	78,506	63.16%
No	28,024	36.84%
Total votes	124,285	100%

==== Public safety and civic facilities ====
2. Are you in favour of council having the authority, without further assent of the electors, to pass by-laws between January 1, 2009, and December 31, 2011, to borrow an aggregate $68,605,000 for the following purposes?

- Public Safety at $31,965,000
- Civic Facilities at $32,490,000
- Library at $4,150,000

Option	Votes	Percentage
Yes	79,429	63.91%
No	26,679	36.09%
Total votes	124,285	100%

==== Parks and recreation facilities ====
3. Are you in favour of council having the authority, without further assent of the electors, to pass by-laws between January 1, 2009, and December 31, 2011, to borrow an aggregate $59,575,000 for the following purposes?

- Recreation Facilities at $52,247,000
- Parks at $7,328,000

Option	Votes	Percentage
Yes	77,259	62.16%
No	29,366	37.84%
Total votes	124,285	100%

== Voter and party statistics ==
=== Voting ===
The 2008 election saw an expansion of voting accessibility with the removal of previous limitations on voting by mail, advance voting, and voting by non-resident property electors (NRPEs). Previously, voters had needed to give a reason such as illness, disability, or temporary absence in order to vote early or by mail, and NRPEs were required to request a special certificate. Despite these measures, turnout was down by 1.66% from the 2005 Vancouver municipal election. Of the 403,663 registered voters, there were 124,285 recorded ballots, marking the voter turnout at 30.79%, compared to 32.45% three years prior.

=== Elected percentage by party ===
Party	Mayor		Councillors		Park board commissioners		School board trustees		Total candidates	
Party	# Elected	% Elected	# Elected	% Elected	# Elected	% Elected	# Elected	% Elected	# Elected	% Elected
Green Party of Vancouver	NIL	N/A	NIL	N/A	1/1	100.0%	NIL	N/A	1/1	100.0%
Vision Vancouver	1/1	100.0%	7/8	87.5%	4/4	100.0%	4/4	100.0%	16/17	94.1%
Coalition of Progressive Electors	NIL	N/A	2/2	100.0%	1/2	50.0%	3/5	60.0%	6/9	66.7%
Non-Partisan Association	0/1	0.0%	1/10	10.0%	1/7	14.3%	2/8	25.0%	4/26	15.4%
Work Less Party of British Columbia	0/1	0.0%	0/4	0.0%	0/1	0.0%	NIL	N/A	0/6	0.0%
Nude Garden Party	0/1	0.0%	NIL	N/A	NIL	N/A	NIL	N/A	0/1	0.0%
Independent candidates	0/11	0.0%	0/8	0.0%	0/5	0.0%	0/2	0.0%	0/26	0.0%

=== Seat changes by party ===
Party	Mayor & councillors				Park board commissioners				School board trustees				Total elected			
Party	2005	2008	% change	% seats	2005	2008	% change	% seats	2005	2008	% change	% seats	2005	2008	% change	% seats
Vision Vancouver	4	8	+100.00%	72.73%	0	4	N/A	57.14%	0	4	N/A	44.44%	4	16	+400.00%	59.26%
Coalition of Progressive Electors	1	2	+100.00%	18.18%	2	1	−50.00%	14.29%	3	3	±0.00%	33.33%	6	6	±0.00%	22.22%
Non-Partisan Association	7	1	−85.71%	9.09%	5	1	−80.00%	14.29%	6	2	−66.67%	22.22%	17	4	−76.47%	14.81%
Green Party of Vancouver	0	0	±0.00%	0.0%	0	1	N/A	0.00%	0	0	±0.00%	0.00%	0	1	N/A	3.70%
