= Fred Bass =

Canadian politician

Vancouver City Councillor
- In office 1999–2005

Personal details
- Born: New York City, New York, United States
- Party: Coalition of Progressive Electors (COPE)
- Other political affiliations: Green Party of Vancouver
- Education: Johns Hopkins University; Harvard University; Case Western Reserve University
- Military Service
- Allegiance: United States
- Branch: United States Army
- Unit: 7th Infantry Division

Fred Bass is a former city councillor, environmentalist and preventive medicine physician in Vancouver, British Columbia, Canada. As an epidemiologist and physician, he focused on reducing tobacco smoking. He served on Vancouver City Council from 1999 to 2005.

== Background ==
Bass was born in New York City, attended Antioch College, Case-Western Reserve Medical School, Harvard School of Public Health, and Johns Hopkins School of Hygiene and Public Health. He served as a preventive medicine officer in the US Army's 7th Infantry Division in Korea and Fort Monmouth, New Jersey. After his military service, he was a tuberculosis control officer for the New Jersey Department of Health and unit medical health officer. He earned a master's degree in epidemiology at the Harvard School of Public Health and a Doctor of Science at Johns Hopkins, writing a thesis on medical care use attributable to cigarette smoking. He taught at the University of Pennsylvania.

== Anti-tobacco work ==
In 1975, Bass began working with the Vancouver health department as a preventive medicine and epidemiology specialist. Soon after, he founded the Tobacco and Illness Committee of the BC Medical Association, and chaired the committee for two decades. With the Vancouver health department, he became Canada's first director of health promotion. In 1989, Bass founded the B.C. Doctors' Stop-Smoking Program, which educated doctors about ways to help addicted patients quit. This program evolved into the Society for Clinical Preventive Care in 1997. Lee Bacchus of the Vancouver Sun called him "perhaps the most passionate and dauntless anti-smoking advocate in the province."

Known for having a quirky side, his initiatives included hiring a plane to fly an anti-tobacco banner at a fireworks event that was sponsored by Benson & Hedges, and organizing a race with live turkeys in Robson Square to publicize a cold-turkey campaign. In the late 1980s to mid 1990s, after years of pressure from the BC Medical Association, the provincial government introduced a series of laws against tobacco advertising and sales of tobacco products to minors, and banned indoor smoking in all public places. In 2001 he was given a Canadian Medical Association Honorary Membership for his work in tobacco control.

Bass himself had started smoking at age 16, and was a pack-a-day smoker when he quit at age 28. "Because I smoked," he said in 1998, "I know the many positive aspects of smoking and I can understand what's going on inside the head of the smoker.

== Early involvement with Vancouver politics ==
In 1989–90, Bass served on Vancouver's Clouds of Change Task Force which addressed the issues of global climate change. Bass, concerned about global warming, entered electoral politics in 1996 as a candidate for Vancouver's civic Green Party under the leadership of Stuart Parker but was defeated by a wide margin. With the support of the Greens' executive and provincial leadership, he sought and won the nomination of the Coalition of Progressive Electors (COPE), the party with which the Greens had just inked a coalition agreement.

== Elected city councillor ==
Bass was first elected to city council in 1999 as a member of COPE, and topped the polls when re-elected in 2002 with 70,525 votes. His political priorities were action on the environment and transit. Bass was outspoken in his opposition to the expansion of gambling and to excessive expenditures for rapid transit by a faction of his party under the leadership of Mayor Larry Campbell.

In order to encourage cycling and walking, Bass introduced a controversial motion in 2005 to explore devoting two lanes of the six-lane Burrard Bridge for cycling (cyclists had been sharing the sidewalk with pedestrians). His first step was a minimal-cost trial of using one lane in each direction for bicycles, reserving the existing sidewalk for pedestrians. A plan to widen the bridge sidewalks was slated to cost $13 million if Bass's $2 million trial failed. Some cyclists applauded the move, though other users of the current bridge sidewalks questioned whether any changes were necessary. Concerns about motorist rage did not deter Bass, who stated "Motorists called for my head long ago and my head is still on my neck." Heritage advocates strongly supported the bicycle trial, since the sidewalk-widening would impair the heritage value of this landmark, art-deco bridge.

In 2005, three COPE councillors and the mayor split from the party to form Vision Vancouver. Bass and councillors Tim Louis, David Cadman, Anne Roberts and Ellen Woodsworth remained in COPE. Bass was not re-elected in the 2005 election, finishing 12th overall with 48,248 votes. In late 2006 he announced his aspiration to run for mayor in the next Vancouver civic election because of his concerns for respect, global warming, homelessness and lack of affordable housing. In August 2007, he announced that he no longer intended to participate in the mayoral race.

== Environmental activism ==
Bass described his anti-smoking work as "practice" for campaigning against global warming. In May 2012, Bass was one of several protesters arrested in White Rock, BC for blocking a train that was carrying American coal destined for shipment to Asia. In 2019, Bass began to facilitate public workshops on "eco-resilience", which he describes as the capacity for individuals, households, communities, and ecosystems to respond to the stresses of environmental collapse.

== Personal life ==
Bass's family comes from an Orthodox Jewish tradition. While he was studying for his undergraduate degree, he became involved in a work-study project in Alaska that was led by Quakers. He remained connected with Quaker communities thereafter, and in later life became a Quaker. He also practices Soto Zen Buddhism. Bass has four adult children, two with his long-term partner Roma Dehr, and two from a previous marriage.
