= B.C. Lee =

Taiwanese-Canadian actor and politician (1954–2019)

- 黎拔佳
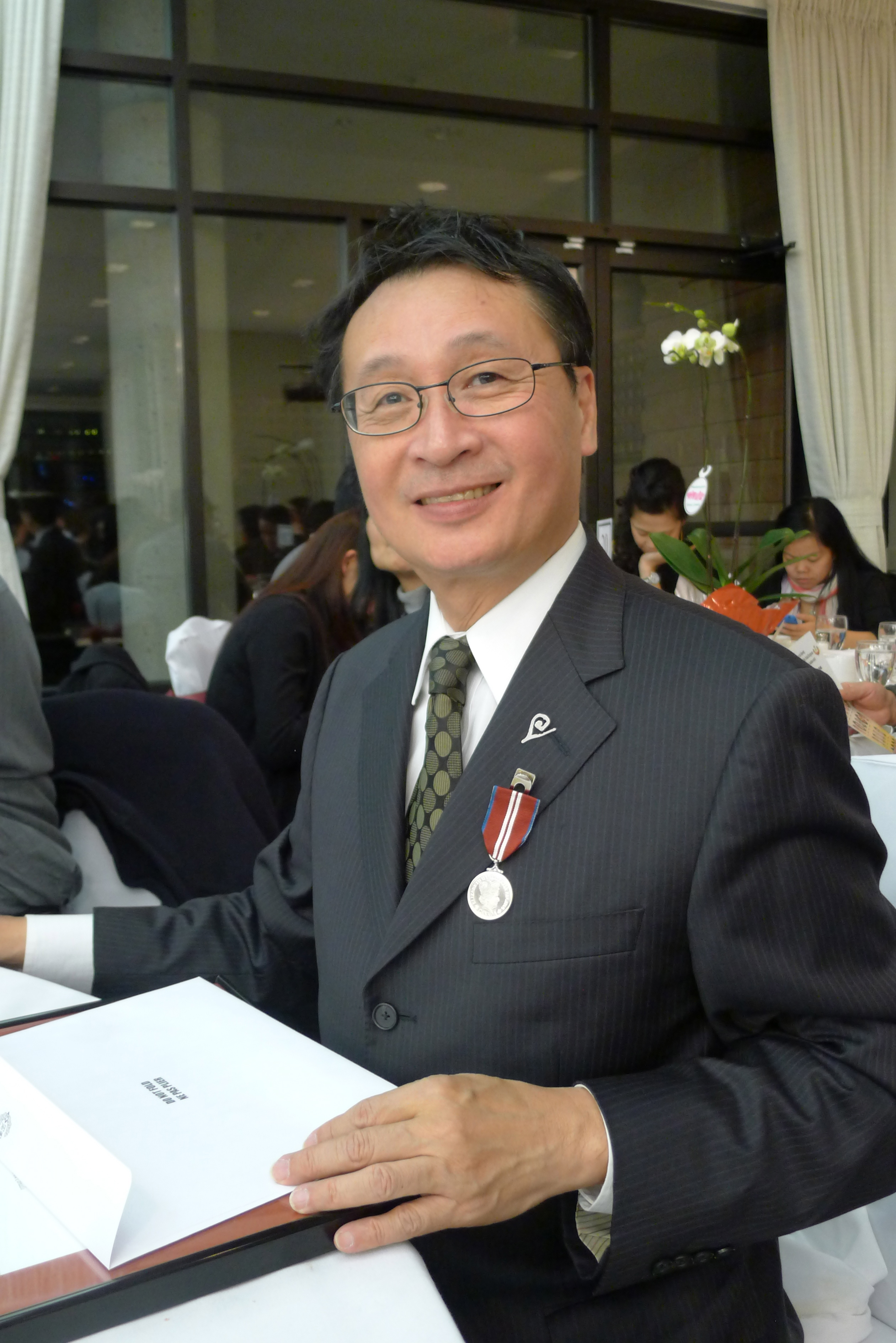
- Lee after being awarded the Queen Elizabeth II Diamond Jubilee Medal on January 6, 2013
- Born: Bar Chya Lee; 27 December 1954; Macau
- Died: 11 September 2019 (aged 64); Burnaby, British Columbia, Canada
- Citizenship: Canadian
- Occupations: Actor, politician
- Honours: Queen Elizabeth II Diamond Jubilee Medal

Bar Chya Lee (Chinese: 黎拔佳; pinyin: Lí Bá Jiā; 27 December 1954 – 11 September 2019), known professionally as B.C. Lee, was a Taiwanese-Canadian actor and politician who served on Vancouver City Council from 2005 to 2008.

== Early life and education ==
Lee was born in Macau and attended the English Primary School of Yuet Wah College. He began to learn how to read and write Chinese at the age of 12 after moving to Taiwan with his family. He studied at Ren-Ai Junior High School in Taipei and Chengcheng Junior High School in Tainan before attending National Tainan First Senior High School. He went on to obtain a bachelor's degree and master's degree in political science from National Chengchi University. In 1983, he moved to the United States to study at New York University (NYU) and earned a master's degree in public administration.

== Career ==
After graduating from NYU, Lee joined the New York City-based law firm Paul, Weiss as a compiler for their China Affairs Department. In 1991, he returned to work in Taiwan until he was dispatched in February 1992 by the Overseas Community Affairs Council to serve as the Secretary of Overseas Chinese Affairs in Western Canada at the Taipei Economic and Cultural Office in Canada’s Vancouver branch. He settled permanently in Vancouver in 1994.

After moving to Vancouver, he worked as a marketing and public relations consultant. He helped establish East Meets West Productions and Fireglo Strategic Marketing Communications Inc. From 1997 to 2000, he helped East Meets West Productions organize large-scale New Year's Eve events in Vancouver and Toronto. During this time, the organization won Annual Best Cultural Festival in the 1998 Canadian Event Awards, and Second Annual Best Festival and Third Annual Best Festival in 1999 and 2000, respectively. He was also the vice president of the Taiwan Chamber of Commerce in B.C. (then known as the Taiwan Entrepreneurs Investors Association in B.C.).

From 2005 to 2008, Lee served as a member of Vancouver City Council.

In 2012, Lee was awarded the Queen Elizabeth II Diamond Jubilee Medal.

Lee was appointed as a board member of the BC Traditional Chinese Medicine and Acupuncture Administration by the British Columbia provincial government in 2012, and was subsequently elected to serve as vice chairman of the board until 2016.

Lee regularly authored columns for print media outlets, and both hosted and featured in digital current affairs programs such as Monday Forum on LS Times TV, for which he hosted 155 episodes between 2013 and 2019.

In addition to politics and public welfare, Lee had a passion for the performing arts. His roles spanned across theatre, television dramas, and movies, and he was nominated for Best Supporting Performance Male Dramatic Series in the 2017 Leo Awards.

== Political career ==
In 2002, Lee was nominated by the Non-Partisan Association to run for Vancouver City Council but was not elected. In 2005, he ran again and was elected, serving on council from 2005 to 2008. At the time, he was the only fluent Mandarin speaker on council.

In 2015, Lee was elected President of the Non-Partisan Association.

== Death ==
Lee died of liver cancer at Burnaby Hospital in Burnaby, British Columbia, on 11 September 2019, at the age of 64.

== Acting credits ==
=== Film ===
Year	Title	Role	Notes	Ref.
1991	Pushing Hands	Waiter Lee	Cameo	
2015	The Blue Jet	Old Ling (voice)	Short film	
2017	Story Unbridled	Wen Jie's Dad	Short film	
2018	Fatal Visit	Patrick		

=== Television ===
Year	Title	Role	Notes	Ref.
2012	Fringe	Chinese Customer	1 episode	
2015	Almost Human	Leonard Li	1 episode	
2016-2018	Blood and Water	Victor Li	Nominated for Best Supporting Performance Male Dramatic Series Leo Award in 2017	

=== Theatre ===
Year	Title	Role	Venue	Ref.
2009	The Flower Drum Song	Wang Chi-Yang	Waterfront Theatre	
2010	Jade in the Coal	Wu Kwun	Pangaea Theatre	
2017	Ga Ting	Hong Lee	Vancouver Asian Theatre	
2018	Chicken Girl	Uncle Chan	Orpheum Annex	
