= Geoff Meggs =

Canadian politician

Chief of Staff to the Premier of British Columbia
- In office July 18, 2017 – November 18, 2022
- Premier: John Horgan
- Preceded by: Steve Carr
- Succeeded by: Matt Smith

Vancouver City Councillor
- In office 2008–2017

Personal details
- Born: 1951 (age 74–75) Ontario

Geoff Meggs is a Canadian politician, who served on Vancouver, British Columbia's City Council from 2008 to 2017. He was first elected in the 2008 municipal election, and resigned his seat on city council in 2017 to accept a job as chief of staff to John Horgan, the premier of British Columbia.

== Background ==
Meggs was born in Ontario and grew up in Willowdale, Toronto and Ottawa. His father, who was trained as an Anglican priest, was a broadcaster with the CBC, and his mother was a nurse who retired to become a homemaker. Meggs graduated from the University of Toronto. After graduating he joined the Canada World Youth exchange program and spent time in Malaysia. He eventually relocated to Vancouver in 1976. Meggs' career includes time as a journalist, a communications director in the offices of former premier Glen Clark and former Vancouver mayor Larry Campbell, an executive director of the BC Federation of Labour, and president of Tideline Communications.

He is the author or co-author of four published books, including Salmon: The Decline of the West Coast Fishery (Douglas & McIntyre, 1991), which won the 1992 Lieutenant-Governor’s Medal for Historical Writing, and Cork Lines and Canning Lines; the Glory Years of Fishing on the West Coast, with Duncan Stacey (Douglas & McIntyre, 1992).

== Politics ==
In 2002 when the Coalition of Progressive Electors were elected with a majority to Vancouver City Council, their party's caucus became divided, and Meggs ran mayor Larry Campbell's fundraising group, the "Friends of Larry Campbell".

Later, Meggs ran as part of the Vision Vancouver slate in the 2008 election. He received 49,538 votes, in ninth place out of a field of 32 candidates for Vancouver councillor, the fewest votes among the seven elected Vision Vancouver councilors. In 2011, Meggs was re-elected as a Vision Vancouver city councillor with 56,183 votes, sixth out of a field of 40 candidates.

In June 2014, Meggs faced a court petition to remove him and fellow councillor Kerry Jang from office for allegedly violating rules on conflict of interest in connection with the rezoning of a public housing project.

Geoff has been a co-host of the BC Politics podcast Hotel Pacifico since October 2023.

== Family ==
Meggs and his wife, Jan O’Brien, live with his daughter Claire in False Creek. Their oldest daughter, Caitlin, lives and works in Victoria.

== Works ==
- 2018: Strange New Country: The Fraser River Salmon Strikes of 1900–1901, 236 pages. Harbour Publishing. ISBN 978-1550178296
- 2012: The Art of the Impossible: Dave Barrett and the NDP in Power, 1972-1975 (co-authored with Rod Mickleburgh), Harbour Publishing. ISBN 978-1550175790
- 1995: Salmon: The decline of the British Columbia fishery, 274 pages. Douglas & McIntyre. ISBN 978-1550544589
- 1992: Cork Lines and Canning Lines (co-authored with Duncan Stacey). Douglas & McIntyre. ISBN 978-1550540505
