= Heather Deal =

Canadian biologist and politician

Vancouver City Councillor
- In office 2005–2018

Vancouver Park Board Commissioner
- In office 2002–2005

Personal details
- Citizenship: Canadian
- Party: Vision Vancouver
- Other political affiliations: COPE (2002–2005)
- Education: Oberlin College; University of British Columbia
- Profession: Biologist

Heather Deal is a Canadian biologist and politician. She served as a Vancouver city councillor until 2018, first elected as a member of Vision Vancouver in 2005. She previously served as a Vancouver Park Board commissioner for the 2002 to 2005 term as a member of Coalition of Progressive Electors.

== Background ==
Deal was born in England and raised in Michigan and spent six years in Ohio doing her undergraduate degree in Biology at Oberlin College and working at Case Western University in Cleveland as a medical research technician. In 1984, she moved to Vancouver and became a Canadian citizen in 1991. Deal got her M.Sc. in microbiology/immunology from UBC and worked in various medical research positions at UBC, VGH and the BC Cancer Agency. She then moved to jobs in education, training and research for UBC Continuing Studies, the BC Government’s Watershed Restoration Program and the David Suzuki Foundation.

In 1989, Deal joined the Vancouver Bach Choir, Vancouver’s premier symphonic choir, and became president of the board two years later. She recruited housing activist Jim Green to the board of directors and in 2001 the choir performed a free concert of Handel’s Messiah in Blood Alley. She continues to sing in the choir today. Citation

== Political career ==
=== Vancouver Park Board ===
In 2002, Deal ran for office for the first time and came in first for the Vancouver Park Board. She served as chair in her first year on the board.

=== Vancouver City Council ===
By 2005 Deal had left COPE and joined the new electoral association, Vision Vancouver. She ran for City Council with the inaugural Vision Vancouver slate in 2005 and was re-elected to Council in 2008, 2011, and 2014.

In her time on Vancouver City Council, Deal was a strong champion for the arts. This included introducing Vancouver’s first Creative City and Music strategies. Deal made it her mission to liven Vancouver’s streets by supporting installations of public art and cultural attractions and festivals like the city’s 125th-anniversary Summer Live concerts. In 2008, Deal introduced an innovative food-cart program that has been credited with creating a food revolution.

== After political life ==
Since leaving City Hall in 2018, Deal has continued to be actively involved in civic life. In 2019, Deal was appointed to the new Granville Island Council with authority and responsibility for governance of Granville Island, and was elected chair by the Council. She was re-elected chair in 2020.
