= Vancouver Park Board =

Elected board overseeing public parks

Type
- Type: Unicameral

History
- Founded: 1890
- Preceded by: Park Committee

Leadership
- Board chair: Brennan Bastyovanszky

Structure
- Seats: 7 commissioners
- Political groups: Majority: COPE (4); Minority: Green (3)

Elections
- Voting system: Plurality at-large voting
- Last election: October 15, 2022
- Next election: October 17, 2026

Meeting place
- 2099 Beach Avenue, Vancouver, British Columbia

Website
- vancouver.ca/your-government/vancouver-board-of-parks-and-recreation.aspx

Constitution
- Vancouver Charter, s.485

Footnotes
- As of December 6, 2023

The Vancouver Board of Parks and Recreation, commonly referred to as the Vancouver Park Board, is the elected board with exclusive possession, jurisdiction and control over public parks in Vancouver, British Columbia, Canada.

Established by an 1889 amendment to the Vancouver Incorporation Act, 1886 (later the Vancouver Charter), has seven elected commissioners who are charged with determining the policy direction of the body. The board has a mandate to "provide, preserve and advocate... to benefit people, communities and the environment". Commissioners are elected at-large every four years, with a chair and vice-chair elected by the commissioners every year. Vancouver is the only major city in Canada with an elected park board, although Cultus Lake, British Columbia, also has an elected board.

== History ==
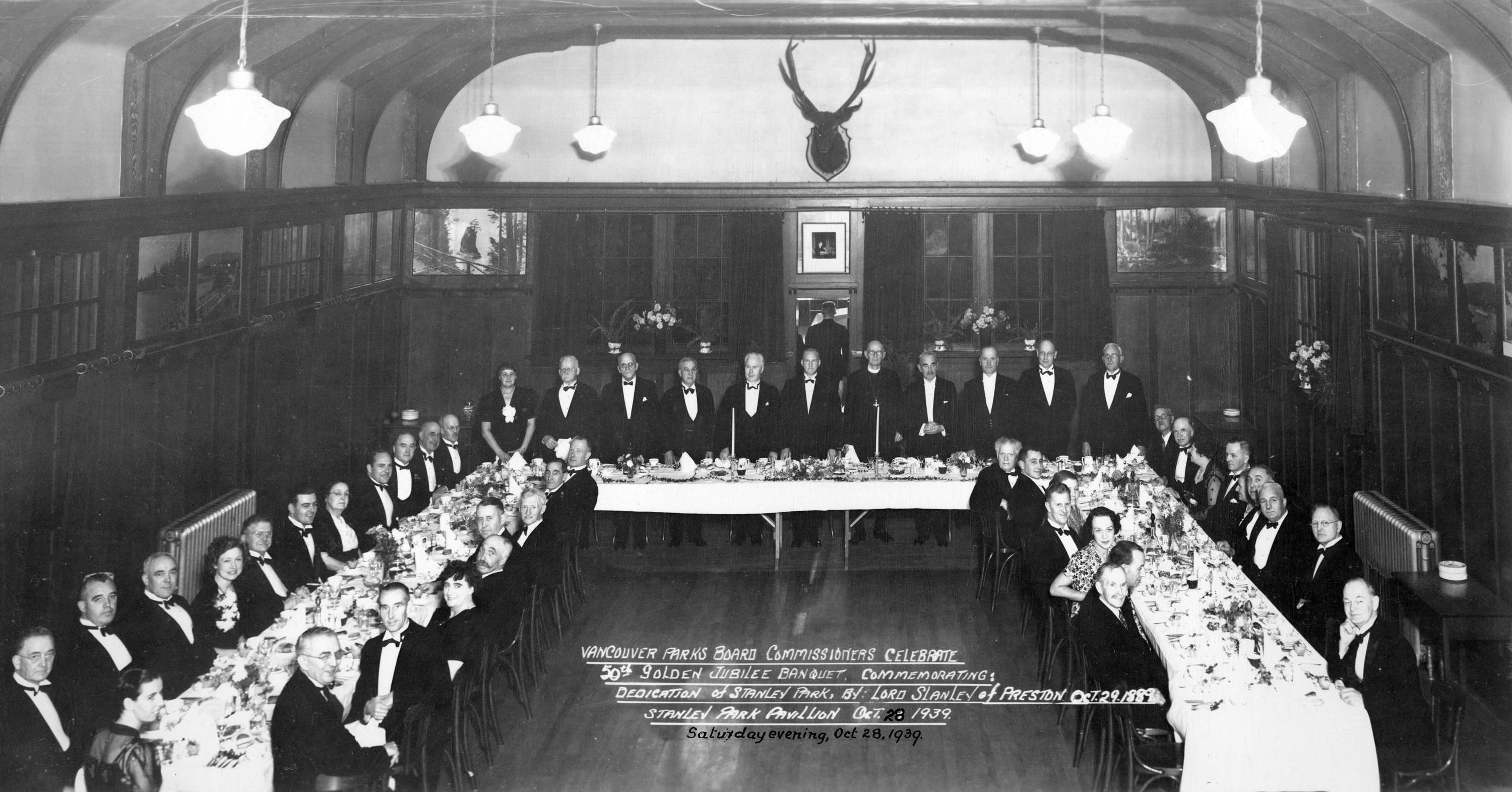
Vancouver Park Board commissioners at the 50th Golden Jubilee Banquet commemorating the dedication of Stanley Park by Lord Stanley in 1889

The Vancouver Park Board has its origins in the 1886 granting of the 380-hectare (950-acre) military reserve at First Narrows to the City of Vancouver for use as a park. The new park, named Stanley Park, was formally opened in 1888. A warden and Parks Committee were appointed to oversee its development and management. In 1890, the appointed committee was replaced by a permanent elected body: three elected commissioners. Vancouver By-law No. 96 created the board and gave the commissioners absolute control and management over the park system. It was expected to expend monies voted to it by city council and had the power to enter into contracts and pass by-laws. Over its history, the board has been known as:

- Committee on Works and Property (1887–1888)
- Parks Committee (1888–1889)
- Board of Parks Commissioners (1890–1955)
- Board of Parks and Public Recreation (1956–1973)
- Board of Parks and Recreation (1974–present)

The first elected commissioners, serving from 1890 to 1891, were James Welton Horne (chairman), M. J. Costello and Robert Garnett Tatlow. The number of commissioners was expanded to five in 1904 and to seven in 1929 when Vancouver amalgamated with the municipalities of South Vancouver and Point Grey.

Park Board commissioners served without remuneration until a 1972 amendment to the Vancouver Charter allowed them an annual honorarium of $1000.

== Members ==
=== Since 2026 ===
As of the 2026 Vancouver municipal election, the commissioners of the Vancouver Park Board are:

Commissioners	Party
Tom Digby	Green
Spencer Van Vloten	Green
T’uy’t’tanat Cease Wyss	COPE
Tamiko Suzuki	COPE
Breanne Smart	Green
Jamie Han	COPE
Sacia Burton	Green

=== 2022–2026 ===
Timeline of elections to the park board since 1966

The commissioners of the Vancouver Park Board who held office prior to the 2026 Vancouver municipal election served until November 2, 2026.

On December 6, 2023, three ABC Vancouver commissioners left the party to sit as independents after Vancouver mayor Ken Sim introduced a motion to ask the provincial government to change the Vancouver Charter to dissolve the park board. While remaining independent, they have indicated they would form a majority bloc with Green Party commissioner Tom Digby. On January 18, 2026, former ABC Vancouver commissioner Scott Jensen announced he was joining the newly created Vancouver Liberals in advance of the 2026 municipal election. In February 2026, former ABC Vancouver commissioner Brennan Bastyovanszky, who had sat as an independent since 2023, joined the Vancouver Liberals.

Name	Party
Brennan Bastyovanszky	ABC Vancouver (2022–2023)
Brennan Bastyovanszky	Independent (2023–2026)
Brennan Bastyovanszky	Vancouver Liberals (since 2026)
Laura Christensen (chair)	ABC Vancouver (2022–2023)
Laura Christensen (chair)	Independent (since 2023)
Tom Digby	Green
Angela Kate Haer	ABC Vancouver
Marie-Claire Howard	ABC Vancouver
Scott Jensen	ABC Vancouver (2022–2023)
Scott Jensen	Independent (2023–2026)
Scott Jensen	Vancouver Liberals (since 2026)
Jas Virdi	ABC Vancouver

=== 2018–2022 ===
The commissioners of the Vancouver Park Board elected at the 2018 Vancouver municipal election served until November 6, 2022.

Name	Party
Tricia Barker	NPA (2018–2022)
Tricia Barker	TEAM (2022)
John Coupar	NPA (2018–2022)
John Coupar	Independent (2022)
Dave Demers	Green
Camil Dumont	Green
Gwen Giesbrecht	COPE
John Irwin	COPE (2018–2022)
John Irwin	Vision (2022)
Stuart Mackinnon	Green (2018–2022)
Stuart Mackinnon	Vision (2022)

=== 2014–2018 ===
The commissioners of the Vancouver Park Board elected during the 2014 Vancouver municipal election served until late 2018.

Name	Party
John Coupar	NPA
Casey Crawford	NPA
Catherine Evans (vice-chair)	Vision
Sarah Kirby-Yung	NPA
Stuart Mackinnon (chair)	Green
Erin Shum	Independent (Note: Shum was elected as an NPA candidate in the 2014 election but announced she would "sit as an independent" in December 2016.)
Michael Wiebe	Green

== Independence ==
In June 2009, Vancouver mayor Gregor Robertson and Vancouver city councillor Raymond Louie, both of whom were members of the Vision Vancouver party, were accused by Vancouver city councillor Suzanne Anton, a member of the opposition Non-Partisan Association party, of attempting to destroy the independence of the park board by centralizing budget oversight. Aaron Jasper, a Vision Vancouver member of the park board, called on the city council to restore the decentralized budget control.

In September 2009, Susan Mundick, the general manager of the board, announced her retirement. Penny Ballem, the city manager of Vancouver hired by Robertson, stripped Mundick of all routine transitional duties. Ballem then stated she would help the park board choose Mundick's replacement, a selection process city hall traditionally had not been involved in. In response, Anton urged Robertson and the city council to limit Ballem's control of the park board.

== Parks ==
The Vancouver Park Board oversees 250 parks and gardens, including major attractions such as Stanley Park and VanDusen Botanical Garden, 24 community centres with pools, skating rinks and playing fields, as well as three golf courses.
