= Business in Vancouver =

Weekly business news journal

Business In Vancouver (BIV)
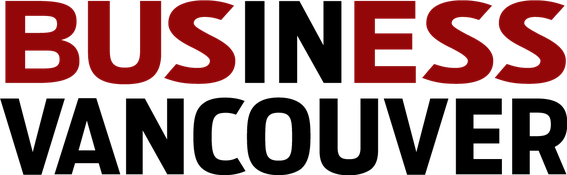

- Front page of the June 1–7, 2020 edition
- Circulation: 1,800
- Total circulation: 62,0000
- Founder: Peter Ladner
- First issue: 1989; 36 years ago
- Company: Glacier Media
- Based in: Vancouver, British Columbia, Canada
- Language: English
- Website: biv.com
- ISSN: 0849-5017

Business in Vancouver (BIV) is a weekly business news journal co-founded in 1989 by Peter Ladner in Vancouver, British Columbia, Canada. Published on Tuesdays it receives about 62,000 readers per week with a print circulation of about 1,800.

Its operations include the biv.com website, a portfolio of nearly two dozen annual business magazines, an extensive roster of special events, a daily radio program on Roundhouse Radio 98.3 FM Vancouver, a weekly podcast, and video production.

Its publisher is the Business in Vancouver Media Group, a division of Glacier Media.

Among its special events, BIV manages an annual Forty Under 40 Awards program for the province's outstanding young entrepreneurs. It also manages the Influential Women in Business Awards related to senior executives in the private and public sectors.

Authors include Nelson Bennett, Glen Korstrom, Kirk LaPointe, Tyler Orton, Hayley Woodin and several commentators including Jock Finlayson, Peter Ladner, Gabriel Yiu, and others.

In 2011 and 2013, its publications won the Jack Webster Foundation Business, Industry & Economics Awards.

The magazine's sections are:

- Agriculture
- Asia-Pacific
- Commentary
- Economy
- Entertainment
- Environment & Sustainability
- Forestry & Fisheries
- Hospitality & Tourism
- Human Resources
- Law & Politics
- Media & Marketing
- Mining & Energy
- Real Estate
- Retail & Manufacturing
- Sports & Leisure
- Technology
- Transportation

In February 2016, BIV listed Metro Vancouver attraction places ranked by number of visitors:

- Grouse Mountain
- Vancouver Aquarium
- Capilano Suspension Bridge Park
- Richmond Olympic Oval
- Science World

For the 2017 provincial election, BIV hosted an all-party debate including Green Party leader Andrew Weaver, Liberal Andrew Wilkinson and NDP Carole James.
