= Kim Capri =

Canadian politician

Kim Capri is a Canadian politician who was elected to Vancouver City Council in 2005 as a member of the Non-Partisan Association. She sought reelection in the 2008 municipal election but was unsuccessful, placing thirteenth with 44,270 votes.

She has also served as executive director of the Vancouver John Howard Society.
