= Green Party of Vancouver =

Municipal political party in Canada

- Leader: Pete Fry
- Chairperson: Nick Poppell
- Founded: 1984
- Ideology: Green politics; Progressivism
- Political position: Centre-left
- National affiliation: Green Party of Canada
- Provincial affiliation: Green Party of British Columbia
- Colours: Green
- City council: 5 / 11
- Park board: 3 / 7
- School board: 2 / 9

Website
- www.vangreens.ca

The Green Party of Vancouver, founded in 1984, is a municipal political party in Vancouver, British Columbia, Canada. It is affiliated with both the provincial Green Party of British Columbia and the federal Green Party of Canada.

Roslyn Cassells was the first elected Green in Canada and was elected to the Vancouver Park Board in the 1999 Vancouver municipal election. In 2002, Andrea Reimer was elected to the Vancouver School Board as a trustee, and in 2008 Stuart Mackinnon was elected a park board commissioner.

The party nominated Green Party of Canada deputy leader Adriane Carr as their sole nominee for Vancouver City Council during the 2011 Vancouver municipal election. Carr subsequently won the seat. Carr retained her council seat during the 2014 Vancouver municipal election, winning with the highest number of votes of any council candidate. School board candidate Janet Fraser and park board candidates Michael Wiebe and Stuart Mackinnon were also elected.

The Green Party of Vancouver further increased its seat count following the 2017 Vancouver municipal by-election, where all three of the party's school board candidates were elected. The party elected nine candidates in the 2018 Vancouver municipal election. In the 2022 Vancouver municipal election, the party fielded 10 candidates: five for City Council, two for Park Board, and three for School Board. Five candidates were elected.

In the 2026 Vancouver municipal election, Pete Fry was elected mayor defeating incumbent Ken Sim, becoming the party's first successful mayoral candidate. The Greens also elected four city councillors, three park board commissioners and two school trustees.

== History ==
=== Prior to 2014 ===
Roslyn Cassels was the first elected Green in Canada and was elected to the Vancouver Park Board in the 1999 Vancouver municipal election. In 2002, Andrea Reimer was elected to the Vancouver School Board as a trustee, and in 2008 Stuart Mackinnon was elected as a park board commissioner. Adriane Carr was elected in 2011 as the first Green city councillor.

=== 2014 municipal election ===
The Green Party of Vancouver nominated seven candidates for the 2014 Vancouver municipal election, held on 15 November 2014. Adriane Carr received the most votes of any council candidate.

School board candidate Janet Fraser and park board candidates Michael Wiebe and Stuart Mackinnon were also elected.

=== 2017 municipal by-election ===
The 2017 Vancouver municipal by-election was called to replace a single vacant council seat, due to Geoff Meggs' departure to take on the role of premier John Horgan's chief of staff. The by-election was also meant to elect a new board of school trustees, who had been dismissed by provincial education minister Mike Bernier after failing to pass a balanced budget and allegations of workplace harassment arose.

The Green Party of Vancouver ran Pete Fry for council and Janet Fraser, Estrellita Gonzalez and Judy Zaichkowsky for school board. All three school trustee candidates were elected, finishing in the top three spots. Non-Partisan Association candidate Hector Bremner was elected to council, and Fry finished a close third behind anti-poverty activist Jean Swanson.

=== 2018 municipal election ===
The Green Party of Vancouver nominated 11 candidates to run in the 2018 Vancouver municipal election on 28 June 2018. School board candidate Nicholas Chernen resigned on 9 July 2018 after it was discovered that he had failed to disclose his involvement in a pending lawsuit to the party, resulting in the party running four council candidates, three school board candidates, and three park board candidates. Prior to the election, both the Vancouver School Board and Park Board were chaired by Green Party incumbents.

The Green Party elected nine candidates in the municipal election. Carr, Fry and Wiebe were elected to city council and all the party's school and parks board candidates were elected.

=== 2022 municipal election ===
Green councillors Carr and Fry were re-elected at the 2022 election, while Wiebe was not. Tom Digby was the only Green, and only non-ABC Vancouver, commissioner elected to the park board, while Green school board incumbents Janet Fraser and Lois-Chan Pedley were re-elected.

=== 2026 municipal election ===
In April 2026, the Greens, Coalition of Progressive Electors (COPE) and OneCity Vancouver agreed to limit their numbers of candidates to reduce competition among progressive candidates. Each party could nominate up to five council candidates. The Greens and COPE could each run four candidates for both the park board and school board, while OneCity could nominate three park board candidates and five school board candidates. The agreement initially allowed each party to nominate a mayoral candidate while committing them to work towards identifying a single progressive contender.

COPE's Stephanie Allen withdrew from the mayoral race on 2 September, citing the need to unite progressive voters against incumbent mayor Ken Sim. OneCity's William Azaroff withdrew on 8 September and endorsed Fry, leaving him as the only mayoral candidate from the three parties.

Fry defeated Sim in the 17 October election. All four Green council candidates—Annette Reilly, Stephanie Smith, Camil Dumont and Bridget Burns—were elected. Tom Digby, Spencer Van Vloten and Breanne Smart won park board seats, while Julie Strilesky and Alisha Masongsong were elected to the school board.

== Electoral results ==
Mayoral
Election	Candidate	Votes	%	Position	Result
1996	Paul Watson	3,117	3.20	4th	Not elected
1999	None	–	–	–	Did not contest
2002	None	–	–	–	Did not contest
2005	None	–	–	–	Did not contest
2008	None	–	–	–	Did not contest
2011	None	–	–	–	Did not contest
2014	None	–	–	–	Did not contest
2018	None	–	–	–	Did not contest
2022	None	–	–	–	Did not contest
2026	Pete Fry	98,494	47.8	▲1st	Elected

Vancouver City Council
Election	Leader (Note: No official party leader. Column shows highest council vote-getter.)	Seats	+/–	Votes	%	Change (pp)	Position
1996	Fred Bass	0 / 11	Steady	28,339	3.39		No seats
1999	Ann Livingston	0 / 11	Steady	77,206	9.68	▲6.29	No seats
2002	Connie Fogal	0 / 11	Steady	74,414	6.50	▼3.18	No seats
2005	Ann Livingston	0 / 11	Steady	27,168	2.51	▼3.99	No seats
2008	–	0 / 11	Steady	–	–	–	No seats
2011	Adriane Carr	1 / 11	▲1	48,648	4.03	▲1.52	Crossbench
2014	Adriane Carr	1 / 11	Steady	168,163	11.58	▼7.55	Crossbench
2017 (Note: By-election: voters were asked to elect one city councillor.)	Pete Fry	1 / 11	Steady	9,759	20.31	▲8.73	Crossbench
2018	Adriane Carr	3 / 11	▲2	218,025	15.61	▼4.70	Crossbench
2022	Adriane Carr	2 / 11	▼2	151,141	11.23	▼4.38	Opposition
2025 (Note: By-election: voters were asked to elect two city councillors.)	Annette Reilly	1 / 11	▼1	15,045	11.32	▲0.09	Opposition
2026	Pete Fry	5 / 11	▲4	262,874	TBD	TBD	Minority

Vancouver Park Board
Election	Seats	+/–	Position
1996	No data		
1999	1 / 7	–	Opposition
2002	0 / 7	▼1	No seats
2005	0 / 7	Steady	No seats
2008	1 / 7	▲1	Crossbench
2011	0 / 7	▼1	No seats
2014	2 / 7	▲2	Opposition
2018	3 / 7	▲1	Minority
2022	1 / 7	▼1	Crossbench
2022	1 / 7	▼1	Majority bloc (Note: Formed with 3 independent commissioners that split from ABC Vancouver in 2023.)
2026	3 / 7	▲2	Crossbench
