= Larry Campbell (Canadian politician) =

Canadian politician (born 1948)

The Honourable Larry Campbell
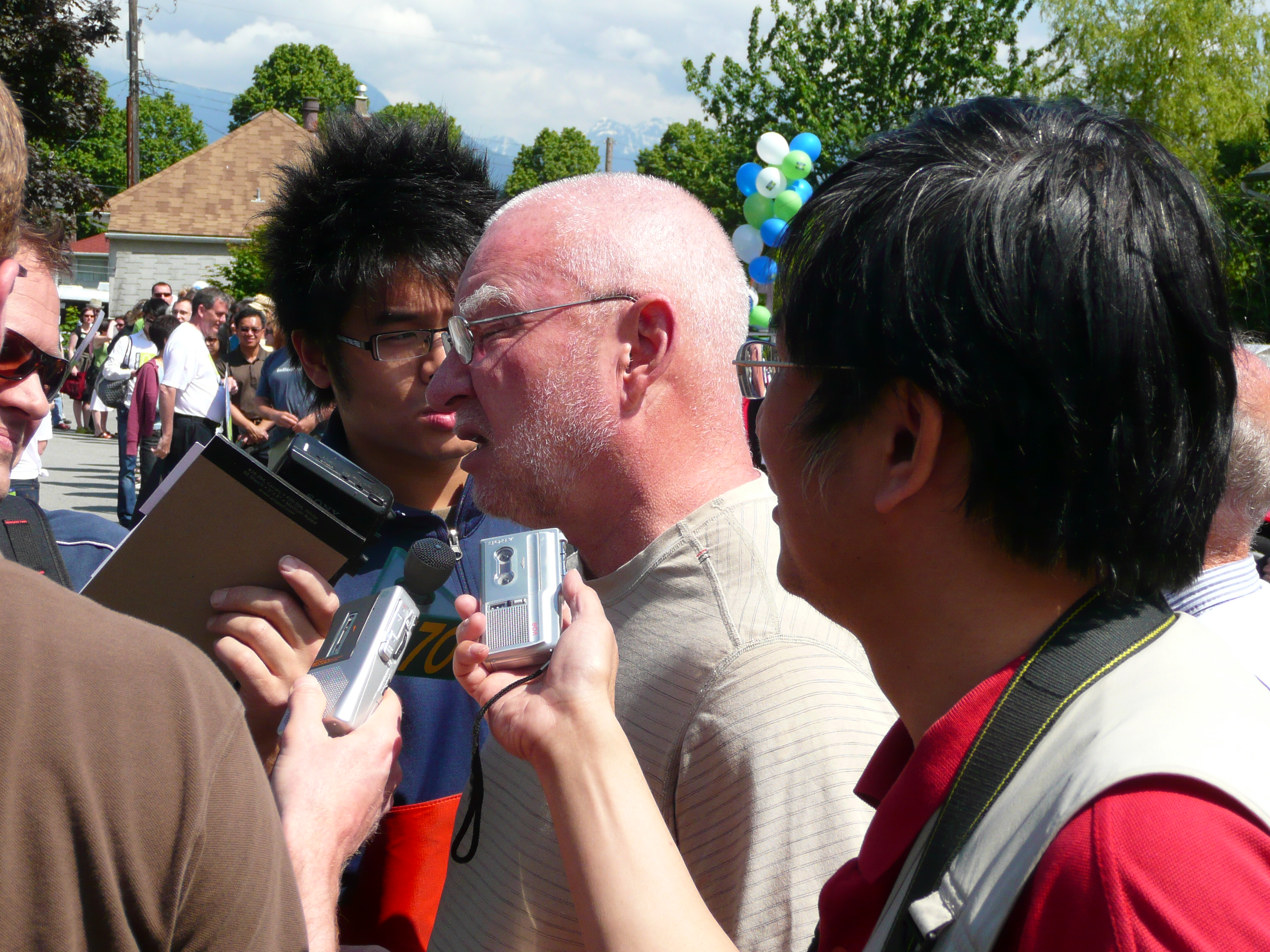
- Campbell in 2009

Canadian Senator from British Columbia
- In office August 2, 2005 – February 28, 2023
- Nominated by: Paul Martin
- Appointed by: Adrienne Clarkson

37th Mayor of Vancouver
- In office 2002 – December 5, 2005
- Preceded by: Philip Owen
- Succeeded by: Sam Sullivan

Personal details
- Born: February 28, 1948 (age 78) Brantford, Ontario, Canada
- Party: Non-affiliated (since 2022)
- Other political affiliations: COPE (2002–2005); Vision Vancouver (2005); Liberal (2005–2014); Senate Liberal Caucus (2014–2016); Independent Senators Group (2017–2019); Canadian Senators Group (2019–2022)
- Occupation: Politician, RCMP, BC Coroner's Service

Larry W. Campbell (born February 28, 1948) is a Canadian politician who was the 37th mayor of Vancouver, Canada, from 2002 until 2005, and a member of the Senate of Canada from 2005 until his retirement in 2023.

Before he was mayor, Campbell worked for the RCMP as a police officer, and in 1969, he was transferred to the Vancouver detachment. From 1973, he served as a member of the force's drug squad.

Starting in 1981, Campbell worked for the Vancouver District Coroner's office and in 1996 was appointed BC Chief Coroner, a post in which he served until 2000.

== Background ==
Originally from Ontario and of Scottish descent, after high school Campbell's grandfather found him a job digging ditches for coaxial cable. Later he was a steel worker as a hand riveter in a boxcar plant in Hamilton. He joined the RCMP on a bet with a Hamilton municipal police officer. He spent about three years in uniform, but did not like to issue traffic tickets. He was transferred to the drug squad in Vancouver where he worked in street enforcement mainly regarding heroin, including undercover work. He started a drug squad in Langley. Throughout his RCMP tenure, he never laid a single marijuana charge.

After serving in the RCMP for 12 years, the provincial chief coroner told him that the new Canadian Charter of Rights and Freedoms would negatively impact his drug enforcement efforts and convinced him to become Vancouver's coroner. During the emerging AIDS pandemic, he became a strong advocate for progressive harm reduction policies, quipping that needle exchanges causing drug addiction "is like flies causing garbage". He served for 20 years, retiring as chief coroner for the province.

As the city's former chief coroner, his life inspired a popular CBC Television drama called Da Vinci's Inquest. The show was later followed by a spinoff, Da Vinci's City Hall, in which the Da Vinci character followed his real-life counterpart into politics. He was also one of several coroners who dismissed the murders of several indigenous women in the Downtown Eastside of Vancouver between 1967 and 1985 as "unnatural and accidental."

== Political career ==
=== Mayor of Vancouver ===
Campbell was elected mayor in the 2002 Vancouver municipal election as a member of the Coalition of Progressive Electors, by a large margin of 58% to 30% for his nearest opponent.

Shortly after Campbell's election, divisions began to emerge within his COPE party between a centrist group, led by Campbell and a more left-wing group. On December 14, 2004, Campbell and councillors Jim Green, Raymond Louie and Tim Stevenson announced that they would form an independent caucus within COPE. The media quickly dubbed the bloc the "COPE Light" councillors (in contrast to the "COPE Classic" councillors). In 2005, the moderate group formed the centre-left Vision Vancouver party, but Campbell announced he would not run for re-election.

=== Senate career ===
On August 2, 2005, Prime Minister Paul Martin announced Campbell's appointment by Governor General Adrienne Clarkson as a Liberal senator. Campbell completed his term as mayor before taking up his seat in the Canadian Senate.

On January 29, 2014, Liberal Party leader Justin Trudeau announced all Liberal senators, including Campbell, were removed from the Liberal caucus, and would continue sitting as independents. According to Senate Opposition leader James Cowan, the senators will still refer to themselves as Liberals even if they are no longer members of the parliamentary Liberal caucus.

On April 6, 2016, Campbell left the Senate Liberal Caucus to sit as an independent and later joined the Independent Senators Group. On November 4, 2019, he joined the Canadian Senators Group. On October 24, 2022, Campbell left the CSG to sit as a non-affiliated senator. Campbell remained an independent senator until February 28, 2023, when he reached the mandatory retirement age of 75.

== See also ==
- Da Vinci's Inquest
