= Peter Ladner =

Canadian politician

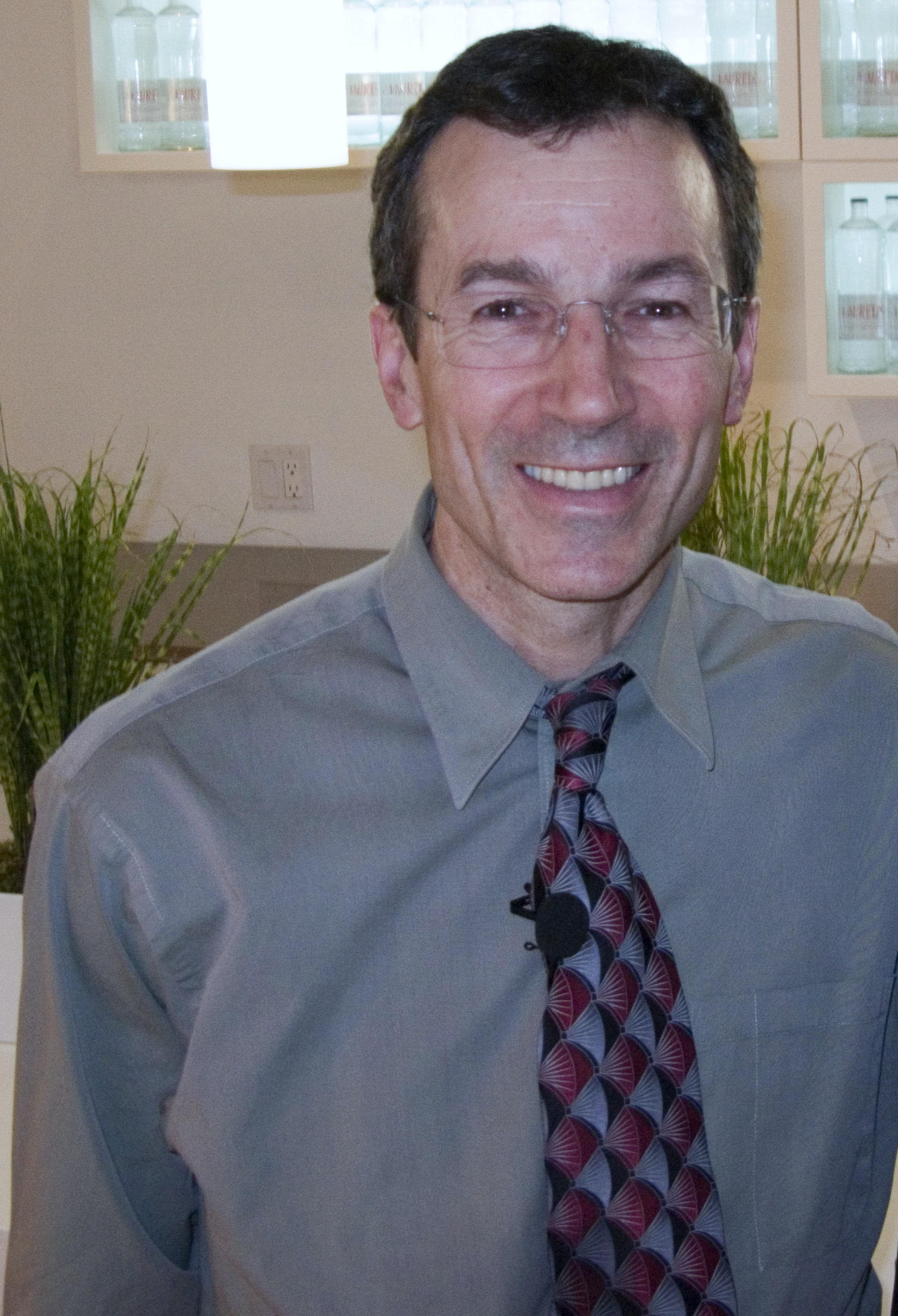
- Ladner in 2008

Vancouver City Councillor
- In office December 5, 2005 – December 8, 2008

Personal details
- Born: February 12, 1949 (age 77)
- Party: NPA (municipal)
- Education: University of British Columbia

Peter Ladner (born February 12, 1949) is a Canadian politician, businessman, and activist. He served on Vancouver City Council from 2005 to 2008 as a member of the Non-Partisan Association (NPA).

Ladner has more than 40 years of journalistic experience in print, radio and television, and is a frequent speaker on food and sustainability issues. He is also the author of The Urban Food Revolution: Changing the Way We Feed Cities, published by New Society in 2011.

== Early life and education ==
Ladner grew up in the Shaughnessy neighbourhood of Vancouver. His paternal grandfather was the founding partner of what has now merged into Borden Ladner Gervais LLP, a prominent Canadian law firm. His ascendants also originally settled and gave their name to the community of Ladner, British Columbia.

== Career ==
=== Pre-politics ===
Ladner briefly attended St. George's School in Vancouver, before graduating from Shawnigan Lake School on Vancouver Island. He later studied at the University of British Columbia (UBC), where he obtained a Bachelor of Arts in Sociology and completed one year of a master's degree in urban planning.

Ladner worked for the Vancouver Sun as a journalist for parts of two summers while attending UBC. He later worked at newspapers on Vancouver Island and was editor of the Victoria alternative weekly Monday Magazine from 1981 to 1986. He has written for The Globe and Mail, Canadian Business and Saturday Night.

Ladner co-founded the weekly newspaper Business in Vancouver (BIV) in 1989 and worked as a BIV columnist until 2017. As publisher of BIV he was nominated for the Ernst and Young Entrepreneur of the Year Award in the Media category in 1999.

=== Political career ===
As a former member of Vancouver City Council, Ladner was a director of TransLink and vice-chair of Metro Vancouver, the Regional District. He has been vice-chair of the Metro Vancouver Sustainable Region Initiative and a member the World Urban Forum Committee. On City Council, he chaired the budget committee and was a member of committees on transportation and traffic and planning and environment. He was also a member of the Vancouver Economic Development Commission.

During his time on Vancouver City Council, Ladner was a sustainability and liveability advocate on issues such as transportation, green buildings, energy use, and waste reduction. He championed greenhouse gas reduction, setting a goal of making Vancouver carbon neutral by 2030. An avid cyclist, Ladner introduced the first motion in favour of a bike sharing program. As a city councilor, he also worked with the Vancouver Food Policy Council in initiating the city's program to add 2010 food-producing community garden plots by 2010.

On June 8, 2008, Ladner won the Non-Partisan Association's mayoral nomination for the 2008 municipal election, defeating incumbent mayor Sam Sullivan in a surprise upset. He defeated Sullivan by 1,066 to 986 votes, after convincing NPA members that Sullivan would be defeated in the upcoming election. However, he was soundly defeated on November 15, 2008, by Gregor Robertson, the mayoral candidate of Vision Vancouver.

== Personal life ==
=== Activism ===
Ladner has previously served as the board chair of the David Suzuki Foundation, The Natural Step Canada, and the Leon and Thea Koerner Foundation. He also served on the boards of the Institute for Media, Policy and Civil Society (IMPACS), the International Centre for Sustainable Cities, the University of British Columbia Alumni Association, New Media BC, the International Association of Area Business Publications, Leadership Vancouver, the Fraser Basin Council and the Forum for Women Entrepreneurs. He also participated in the Vancouver City Planning Commission, the capital campaign committee for Vancouver Public Library and the Central Valley Greenway.

Ladner is a long-time environmentalist, healthy living enthusiast, and advocate of the smart city concept of using technology to make government more efficient and effective. From 2009 to 2011, he was a Fellow at the Simon Fraser University Centre for Dialogue, where he focused on researching, teaching and organizing public events around the theme Planning Cities as if Food Matters.

He is a former age-group record holder in the North Shore Knee-knackering Trail run, a 50-km ultramarathon from Horseshoe Bay to Deep Cove.

=== Sister's death ===
On April 3, 2009, Ladner's sister, Wendy Ladner-Beaudry, was found dead in Pacific Spirit Park at age 53, described as "the victim of an apparent random attack." She was the co-chair of the BC Games Society, a former board member of Sports BC, and the former chair of the KidSport Fund, a charity that was established "to help low-income families participate in sport."

John Furlong, chief executive officer of the Vancouver Organizing Committee for the 2010 Olympic and Paralympic Winter Games (VANOC), was a personal friend of Ladner-Beaudry and reserved a place in the 2010 Olympics torch relay for her family.

Ladner stated that, despite his sister's murder, he wished for Vancouver to be seen as a safe city. In a public statement, he said: "Our family, all of us, pledge to work diligently with the police, the neighbours and the wider community to bring this killer to justice and establish the safety of our entire community."

In April 2026, the Royal Canadian Mounted Police in British Columbia appealed to the public for any information regarding the case, which remained unsolved.
