= Andrea Reimer =

Canadian politician

Andrea Reimer is a Canadian politician, who served on Vancouver, British Columbia's City Council from 2008 to 2018. She was first elected in 2002 to the Vancouver School Board as a Green Party candidate. She was defeated as a Green Party candidate in her re-election campaign in 2005 and then joined the Vision Vancouver party to support Gregor Robertson's mayoral campaign. She subsequently ran for and won a council seat in the 2008 municipal election. After serving four terms on council, she chose not to run for re-election in the 2018 municipal election. She is currently an adjunct professor at the School of Public Policy and Global Affairs at the University of British Columbia and Simon Fraser University, and served on the UBC Board of Governors as a provincial appointee from December 2019 to October 2020.

Andrea is the host of the SHE.THEY.US podcast, focusing on the impact of Canada's housing crisis on women and gender diverse humans, now in season 3. The podcast was created by the Pan-Canadian Voice for Women's Housing (PCVWH), a national project focused on ensuring housing policies across Canada include and prioritize women and children.

== Background ==
Reimer was born in Saskatoon, Saskatchewan and put into foster care. When she was eight months old, she was adopted by a couple from Vancouver who subsequently relocated to Calgary prior to her starting school. Reimer's adoptive parents divorced when she was a pre-teen.

Reimer started smoking and drinking at the age of 10 and started to experiment with illicit drugs at the age of 11, and LSD at the age of 12. She was homeless between the ages of 14 and 19, which included travel to places throughout Canada, the United States, Asia, Central America, Europe and North Africa. During this period she dumpster-dived, got arrested several times, got involved in hard drugs, and developed addictions. When she was 18, Reimer worked in El Salvador at a low-income housing project, which she later cited as the catalyst for her environmental awareness.

Although an atheist, at 19 Reimer enrolled at Concordia University to major in religious studies. She dropped out during her first year after six weeks of classes, and moved to Vancouver. In Vancouver, Reimer joined a government-sponsored job training program and started working with Gordon Neighbourhood House Youth Works. She was then sent for a practicum to the Western Canada Wilderness Committee.

Reimer eventually worked her way up to become the executive director of the Western Canada Wilderness Committee, where she was paid approximately $2000 a month. While executive director of the Wilderness Committee, Reimer supported the creation of a carbon tax by the BC Provincial Government. It was subsequently passed. In 2007, she was chosen by Al Gore to deliver the Inconvenient Truth presentation to local audiences.

== Political career ==
=== Green Party ===
Reimer joined the Green Party in 1996, and volunteered in the 1996 provincial election, the 1999 civic election, the 2000 federal by-election and the 2001 provincial election. She has held internal elected office as Communication Chair, Green Party of BC (1999–2002) and Chair, Green Party of Vancouver (2002–2008). Reimer was the first Green Party candidate elected to a school board seat in Canada when she was elected in 2002. She ran for re-election as a Green Party candidate in 2005 yet was defeated.

=== Vision Vancouver ===
Reimer joined the Vision Vancouver party to support Gregor Robertson's mayoral campaign, which she co-chaired. She subsequently ran for and won a council seat in the 2008 municipal election.

=== School Board ===
As a school trustee, Reimer supported efforts to remove vending machines and corporate logos from schools. She pushed for getting school garden programs into schools.

In January 2003, she supported the Green Party's position against bringing the Olympic Games to Vancouver in 2010 due to concerns about the money it would require. In 2008 she characterized her position as still ambivalent about the money spent on the Olympics but prepared to put her full energy into ensuring the Games were as good as possible.

=== City Council ===
As City Councillor, Reimer was a member of Gregor Robertson's Greenest City Team. The team was tasked with catalyzing immediate action on green issues, a ten-year action plan to become the world's greenest city and creating an environment supportive of green economic development in the city of Vancouver. Reimer introduced a motion, which passed, to open Vancouver city data to the public and endorse the principles of open source. Reimer introduced a motion, which passed unanimously, to allow Vancouver residents to keep hens in their backyards. The motion was opposed by the British Columbia Society for the Prevention of Cruelty to Animals, the Vancouver Humane Society, and the BC Poultry Association. The proposal was brought forward as a result of a recommendation from the City of Vancouver's Food Policy Council.

Reimer's other appointments on Vancouver City Council included:

- Chair, Standing Committee on Planning and Environment
- Vancouver Economic Development Commission
- Joint Childcare Council
- Family Court-Youth Justice Committee

Reimer also sat on the Metro Vancouver Regional District board and was appointed to the Regional Planning Committee, Agricultural Committee, Electoral Area A Committee and GVRD/UBC Joint Committee.

=== Twitter controversy ===
In October 2009, Reimer posted on Twitter regarding the British Columbia Minister of Housing and Social Development Rich Coleman's weight in response to provincial legislation proposed by Coleman to bring homeless people to shelters during extreme weather, even against their will. Reimer posted that instead of police bringing homeless people to shelters during extreme weather, she was thinking of introducing legislation to have the police bring Coleman to Jenny Craig, an international weight loss company, on his next visit to Vancouver.

Coleman responded by calling the comment amateurish and from a councillor that "doesn't know any better." Reimer later apologized for the posting.

== Family ==
Reimer and her husband have a child. They live near Trout Lake in East Vancouver.
