= Jamie Lee Hamilton =

Canadian politician and advocate (1955–2019)

- Born: September 20, 1955; Vancouver, British Columbia
- Died: December 23, 2019 (aged 64); Grandview–Woodland, Vancouver, British Columbia
- Education: Capilano University
- Occupations: Political candidate and advocate

Jamie Lee Hamilton (September 20, 1955 – December 23, 2019) was a Canadian political candidate and advocate of aboriginal people, residents of Vancouver's poverty-stricken Downtown Eastside, and sex workers. She was an independent candidate for the publicly elected Vancouver Board of Parks and Recreation in the city's 2008 municipal election, after being controversially blocked from running on the Non-Partisan Association ticket.

Hamilton was a lifelong resident of the Downtown Eastside and Strathcona, Vancouver. She ran for Vancouver City Council in 1996, becoming the first transgender person to run for political office in Canada.

== Early life ==
Jamie Lee Hamilton was the child of Ralph Hamilton and Alice Hamilton. Ralph was an immigrant from Washington, USA, with Irish roots, who championed the unity of Ireland and Northern Ireland. Ralph was also a union organizer with the Foundry Workers' Union.

Alice was from the Rocky Boy Band and became a leader of the aboriginal community in Vancouver. She was a founder of the Vancouver Aboriginal Friendship Centre in 1954. She was a cannery worker and member of the United Fishermen and Allied Workers' Union (UFAWU). She was one of the Militant Mothers of Raymur who blockaded the Burlington Northern Railway tracks to demand an overpass so the children of the Raymur housing project could attend school.

In 1967, Hamilton's parents co-founded the Unemployed Citizens Welfare Improvement Council (UCWIC) along with later-to-be Member of Parliament Margaret Anne Mitchell, tenants advocate Margaret Ellen Mitchell, and others. They also were among the first members of the Downtown Eastside Residents' Association (DERA).

Hamilton attended Lord Strathcona Elementary School, Britannia Secondary School, and Capilano University. In 1968, in the Moccasin for Miles, she walked from Vancouver to Hope. Beginning in her youth, Hamilton worked as a sex worker and became an advocate of the various communities of which she was a member. In 1970, she was the first youth to be treated in Canada for gender identity disorder. Her doctor was William Maurice of the Vancouver Hospital and Health Sciences Centre.

== Career ==
Hamilton served on the board of directors of the Greater Vancouver Native Cultural Society, which has served the aboriginal two-spirited community since 1978.

Hamilton was a writer, entertainer, and guest lecturer in Women's and Gender Studies at the University of British Columbia and Capilano University, her alma mater.

At the time of her death, she was working on a research project at the University of British Columbia, "The Expulsion of Sex Workers from Vancouver's West End, 1975–1985", as she was one of those expelled by the court ruling.

== Controversies ==
In 2000, Hamilton was charged with running a bawdy house when it was revealed she allowed some sex workers to use an East End property as a brothel and safe house, charging them $15 per visit to cover expenses. A year later, the Vancouver Sun reported Hamilton used money from her government-funded drop-in centre to help finance her 1999 city council campaign. At the time, Hamilton said her campaign would repay some of those expenditures which had been approved by the drop-in centre's board of directors.

In August 2008, Hamilton was preparing a human rights complaint against the Non-Partisan Association, the city's governing party, after it rejected her as a parks board candidate, which she alleges was due to an advertisement she had placed on ShemaleCanada.com, an online meeting place for transgender individuals. This account conflicted with the NPA board's explanation that neither her gender identity nor her work as a sex worker were factors in her suitability for candidacy.

Her complaint was supported by a number of prominent local figures, including former NPA city councillor Alan Herbert, Little Sister's founder Jim Deva, and incumbent park commissioners Loretta Woodcock and Spencer Herbert.

== Death ==
Hamilton died at age 64 on December 23, 2019. She had been in hospice care in Grandview–Woodland since December 9.
