= Tim Stevenson =

Canadian politician and minister

The Reverend Tim Stevenson
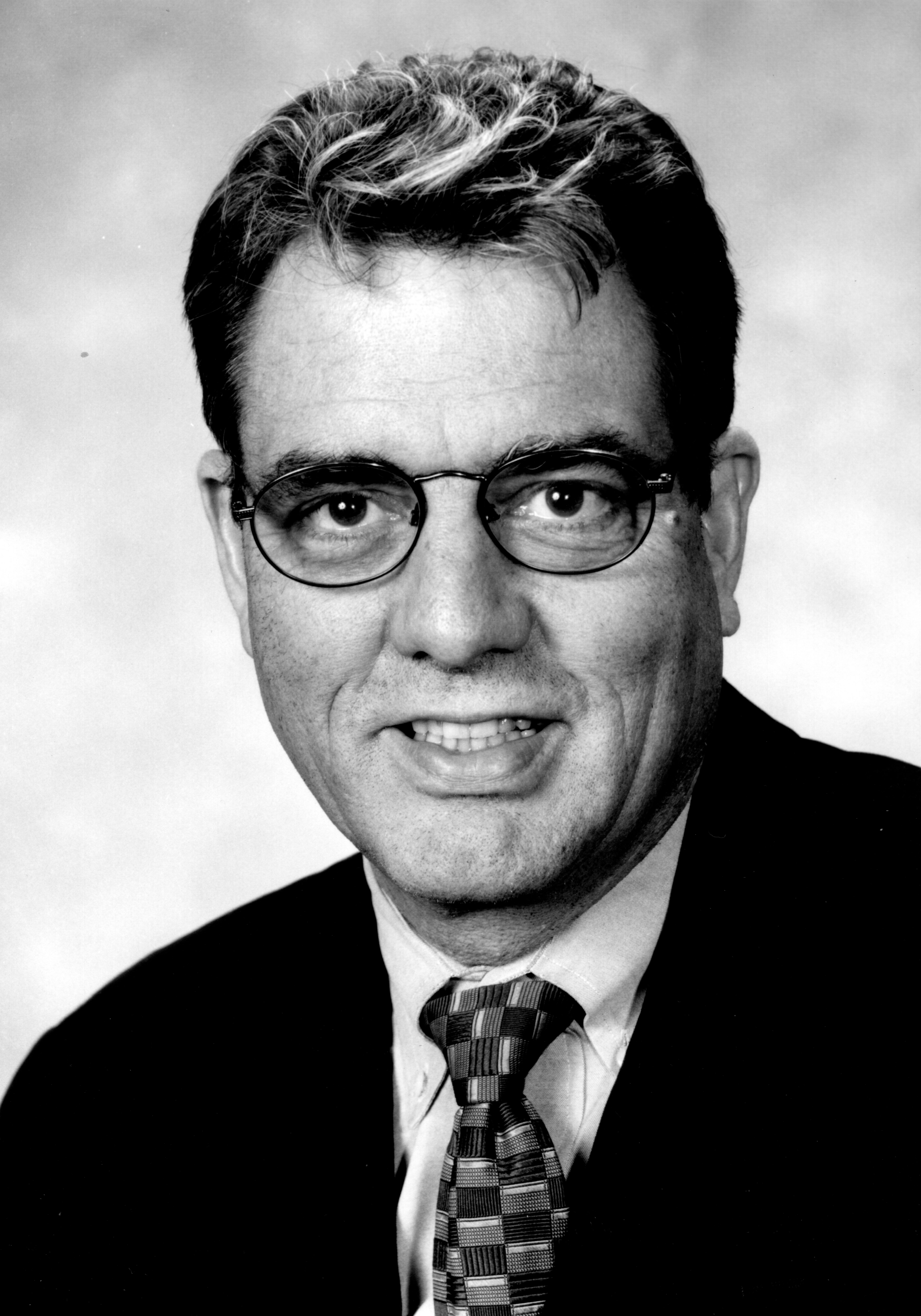
- Stevenson in 2000

Member of the British Columbia Legislative Assembly for Vancouver-Burrard
- In office May 28, 1996 – May 16, 2001
- Preceded by: Emery Barnes
- Succeeded by: Lorne Mayencourt

Vancouver City Councillor
- In office December 2, 2002 – November 5, 2018

Personal details
- Born: 1945 (age 80–81) Vancouver, British Columbia
- Party: New Democratic; Vision Vancouver
- Spouse: Gary Paterson
- Occupation: Minister

Tim Stevenson (born 1945) is a Canadian politician and United Church minister. He served as councillor on the Vancouver City Council from 2002 to 2018, initially as a member of the Coalition of Progressive Electors and from 2005 as a member of Vision Vancouver. He was a founding member of Vision Vancouver.

== Background ==
Stevenson received a B.A. from the University of British Columbia, a M.A., Spirituality from Holy Names College in Oakland, California where he studied with Matthew Fox and a M.Div from the Vancouver School of Theology. In 1992 he was ordained by the British Columbia Conference of the United Church of Canada. Stevenson was the first openly gay person to be ordained in Canada. In 1993 he began his ministry at St. Paul's United Church in Burnaby. He also served as a board member at the First United Church in the Downtown Eastside for 10 years.

Stevenson has worked in the Philippines and South Africa. In 1991 he was a Canadian representative at the African National Congress Conference in Durban when Nelson Mandela was elected ANC party president. In 1994 he was an international observer in South Africa's first election after the fall of apartheid. Also in South Africa he has worked with the Black Liberation Gay and Lesbian Movement and other organizations that focus on social injustices.

== Political career ==
In the 1996 Provincial election he was elected in Vancouver-Burrard to the Legislative Assembly of British Columbia as a member of the British Columbia New Democratic Party. He was the first openly gay MLA elected in British Columbia. He served as Parliamentary Secretary to the Minister of Health as well as the deputy speaker of the House. Between 2000 and 2001 he held a cabinet position as Minister for Employment and Investment. He was the first openly gay cabinet minister (either provincial or federal) in Canada. He lost his provincial seat in 2001 to Lorne Mayencourt of the B.C. Liberals.

In 2002 he was elected to the Vancouver City Council in British Columbia. As a member of the city council and board member of Tourism Vancouver, he is known for modernizing Vancouver's entertainment and tourism industry. When gay marriage became legalized in British Columbia, Stevenson performed the first legal gay weddings in the province. In 2014 Stevenson represented the city of Vancouver as deputy mayor at the Sochi Olympics. He met with the President's Office of the International Olympic Committee urging them to add "sexual orientation" to the Olympic Charter. They subsequently did so.

Stevenson was a candidate in the 2005 provincial election, again in Vancouver-Burrard. Conflicting results throughout election night had both Stevenson and Mayencourt declared the victor at different times, and the uncertainty continued for several weeks. In the official count of regular ballots, Stevenson was declared the winner by 17 votes. However, when absentee ballots were counted on May 30, 2005, Mayencourt was declared the winner by a margin of 18 votes. After a judicial recount, Mayencourt was declared the victor by 11 votes.

Stevenson won re-election as a city councillor in the 2005 Vancouver municipal election as a member of Vision Vancouver, and again in the 2008 election and the 2011 election.

== Personal ==
Stevenson's spouse for 14 years has been Gary Paterson, another minister and former moderator of the United Church of Canada. Same sex marriage in Canada is legal, and Stevenson and Paterson were legally married in 2004.

== Electoral record ==
1996 British Columbia general election: Vancouver-Burrard
Party	Candidate	Votes	%	±%	Expenditures
New Democratic	Tim Stevenson	10,646	49.70	−1.23	$43,534
Liberal	Duncan Wilson	7,975	37.23	+2.00	$50,880
Progressive Democrat	Laura McDiarmid	1,014	4.73	–	$1,072
Green	Imtiaz Popat	563	2.63	+0.32	$155
Reform	Aletta Buday	671	3.13	–	$100
Libertarian	John Clarke	458	2.14	–	
Natural Law	Wayne A. Melvin	93	0.43	–	$100
Total valid votes		21,420	100.00		
Total rejected ballots		257	1.19		
Turnout		21,677	62.68		

2001 British Columbia general election: Vancouver-Burrard
Party	Candidate	Votes	%	±%	Expenditures
Liberal	Lorne Mayencourt	11,396	48.11	+10.88	$46,939
New Democratic	Tim Stevenson	7,359	31.07	−18.63	$45,493
Green	Robbie Mattu	3,826	16.15	+13.52	$1,029
Marijuana	Marc Emery	906	3.82	–	$394
Unity	Gregory Paul Michael Hartnell	290	1.15	–	–
Independent	Boris Bear	136	0.57	–	$157
People's Front	Joseph Theriault	40	0.17	–	$57
Independent Rhinoceros	Helvis	25	0.11	–	$100
Total valid votes		23,688	100.00		
Total rejected ballots		123	0.52		
Turnout		23,811	63.67		

2005 British Columbia general election: Vancouver-Burrard
Party	Candidate	Votes	%	±%	Expenditures
Liberal	Lorne Mayencourt	12,009	42.16	−5.94	$161,227
New Democratic	Tim Stevenson	11,998	42.12	+11.04	$67,587
Green	Janek Patrick John Kuchmistrz	3,698	12.98	−3.21	$8,237
Libertarian	John Clarke	388	1.36	–	$100
Work Less	Lisa Voldeng	170	0.60	–	$1,855
Sex	John Gordon Ince	111	0.39	–	$100
Democratic Reform	Ian McLeod	82	0.29	–	$400
Platinum	Antonio Francisco Ferreira	27	0.09	–	$100
Total valid votes		28,483	100		
Total rejected ballots		196	0.69		
Turnout		28,679	51.95		
