= Raymond Louie =

Canadian politician

Vancouver City Councillor
- In office 2 December 2002 – 5 November 2018

Personal details
- Born: Vancouver, British Columbia, Canada
- Party: Vision Vancouver (2005 - present); COPE (? - 2005)

Raymond Louie (traditional Chinese: 雷建華; simplified Chinese: 雷建华; pinyin: Léi Jiànhuá; born 16 January 1965) is a Canadian politician who served five terms as a Vancouver City Councillor. Formerly a member of the Coalition of Progressive Electors, Louie left the party and was re-elected in 2005, 2008, 2011, and 2014 as a member of Vision Vancouver.

== Background ==
Louie was born and raised in East Vancouver, and has ancestry from Zhongshan, Guangdong, China. His family ran a local bakery. He was the youngest of three siblings. He is distantly related to billionaire businessman Brandt Louie. Louie attended Nootka Elementary School and Windermere Secondary School. After graduating from high school he attended British Columbia Institute of Technology, yet never graduated. Louie worked at Mail-O-Matic Services, a local mailing house, and as a mailer with Pacific Newspaper Group. While working at Pacific Newspaper Group, Louie became a National Representative for the Communications, Energy and Paperworkers Union of Canada.

== Vancouver City Council ==
Louie was first elected to Vancouver City Council in 2002, and was re-elected in 2005, 2008, 2011 and 2014.

As a city councillor, Louie was involved with a number of local organizations, including the Parent Advisory Committee for Maquinna Annex and Community Visions, a community liaison group in Hastings–Sunrise.

In Council, Louie has served in numerous city committees:

- Member, Standing Committee on Planning and Environment
- Member, Standing Committee on Transportation and Traffic
- Member, Standing Committee on City Services and Budgets
- Director, Vancouver Parking Corporation
- Director, Vancouver Civic Theatres Board
- Co-chair, Steering Committee for the redevelopment of Southeast False Creek
- Vice-chair, City Creative Task Force
- Co-chair, Mayor's Working Group on Immigration
- Director, Greater Vancouver Regional District (GVRD)
- Director, GVRD Labour Relations Bureau
- Director, GVRD Finance Committee
- Director, Greater Vancouver Transportation Authority (GVTA)
- Director, GVTA Finance and Audit Committee

== Homeless Emergency Action Team ==
Louie was one of three elected officials who served on Homeless Emergency Action Team, which conceived the controversial Homeless Emergency Action Team (HEAT) shelters.

== Mayoral aspirations ==
In a 2007 interview, former Mayor of Vancouver and current Canadian Senator, Larry Campbell, described Louie as a future mayor of Vancouver. Campbell added that he still holds that view, but wouldn't say if Louie should run for mayor in 2008. "That would be up to Raymond," Campbell said: "I just know that someday he'll be mayor. I don't know when that will be." On 12 March 2008, Louie announced his intention to run for the Vision Vancouver mayoral nomination. In an effort to secure the nomination, Louie outspent all mayoral hopefuls with a total of $243,621 in expenses. However, in June 2008 he was defeated in the nomination race by Gregor Robertson, who went on to win the subsequent general election.

== Family life ==
Louie lives in East Vancouver with his wife and their three children. He is an avid cyclist and has participated in the Gastown Grand Prix and Tour de White Rock.
