= David Cadman =

Canadian politician

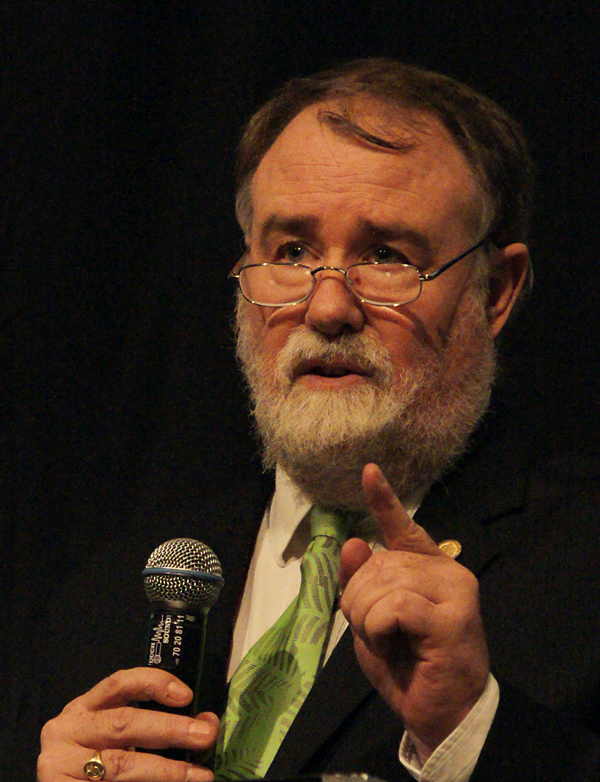
David Cadman

David Cadman is a Canadian former politician who served on Vancouver City Council from 2002 to 2011. A social and environmental activist, Cadman served as a member of the Coalition of Progressive Electors (COPE).

Cadman was born in Montreal, Quebec and grew up in Toronto, Ontario. He studied international development at the University of the South in Sewanee, Tennessee, and in Geneva, Switzerland. He is fluent in French, and later attended the Sorbonne. After university, he spent several years developing literacy programs in Tanzania and Kenya. He returned to Canada in 1976 and settled in British Columbia.

Cadman worked for the Social Planning and Research Council of B.C. and the Greater Vancouver Regional District as a communications director. He later served as president of the Society Promoting Environmental Conservation.

== Politics ==
Cadman ran for Mayor of Vancouver in 1999, endorsed by both the Coalition of Progressive Electors and the Green Party of Vancouver, but was defeated by incumbent mayor Philip Owen. In 2002, Cadman was elected to council as part of the COPE sweep of that year's municipal elections. Cadman was one of the left-wing "COPE Classic" councillors, and remained with COPE when his centrist colleagues formed Vision Vancouver. He was the only COPE councillor re-elected in 2005, finishing sixth in votes.

In 2004, Cadman opposed the construction of the Canada Line, arguing that people would not use it. He argued that "there is no rational reason why we should risk the entire public-transit system – 80 percent of which is buses – on an expenditure where there is dubious assurance that the ridership will arrive."

On September 18, 2011, COPE announced that Cadman would not be nominated as one of the party's three candidates for the municipal election that November.

In March 2007, Cadman became the president of ICLEI - Local Governments for Sustainability, an international organization of local governments who have made a commitment to sustainability. He served in the role until 2015.
