= Ellen Woodsworth =

Canadian politician

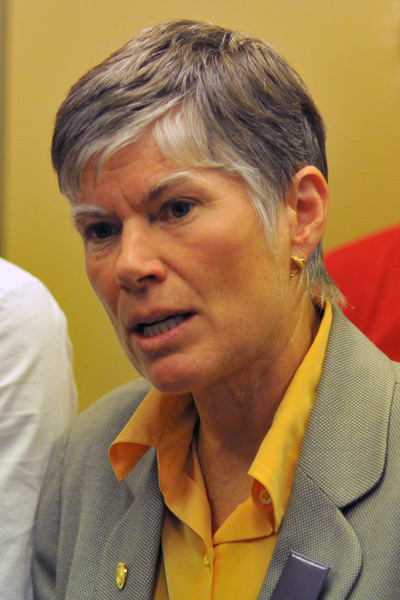
Ellen Woodsworth speaking at a press conference in Vancouver, Canada.

Ellen Woodsworth is an international speaker, activist, and politician based in Vancouver, British Columbia, Canada. She is the founder and matriarch of Women Transforming Cities International Society and serves as co-chair of Women's International League for Peace and Freedom (WILPF) Canada. She also founded the World Peace Forum.

Woodsworth served on two non-consecutive terms on Vancouver City Council as a member of the Coalition of Progressive Electors (COPE), from 2002 to 2005 and from 2008 to 2011.

== Early life and education ==
Ellen Woodsworth was born in Toronto, Ontario, to Jean and Ken Woodsworth. Her father was born and raised in Japan. She went to the Canadian Academy in Japan for high school, before returning to Canada to complete her BA at the University of British Columbia.

=== Early activism ===
After earning her degree, she co-founded and edited the newspaper titled The Other Woman in Toronto and created CORA the Women's Liberation Bookmobile with Judith Quinlan. In 1971, the Vancouver Women’s Caucus wanted to build a movement that would draw people together. "We didn’t have birth control pills in those days and there was no right to abortion. We thought, well, abortions are a healthcare issue, which is key to all women.” So with a handful of women, Woodsworth embarked on the “Abortion Caravan.” They drove all over Canada putting on performances and speaking about a woman’s right to choose. In 1974, Woodsworth helped found the Toronto Wages for Housework Campaign. She moved to London, England to work with the International Wages for Housework Campaign in 1975.

=== Activism in Vancouver ===
In 1970, Woodsworth was part of the VWC/SFU/UBC On to Ottawa Caravan which included students, teachers, workers and housewives. The VWC had as its focus the issues of equal pay, childcare, birth control and abortion clinics. They chained themselves in the House of Commons to call on the PM and MPs to call for legalization of abortion.

In 1979, Woodsworth was part of a national group that got Canada to include unpaid work in the 1996 census, making it the first country in the world to do so. Woodsworth also chaired the BC Action Canada Network, which opposed the free trade agreements. She was hired as a social planner by the District of North Vancouver to document the childcare needs of the district. Woodsworth was elected chair of Britannia Community Services Centre and on the Board of REACH Community Health Clinic coming up with the logo "community health in community hands" to support neighborhood health services.

She served as chair of the Bridge Housing Society. Woodsworth also sat on the inaugural board of the LGBTQ+ Generations Project. Woodsworth has been active in speaking out about the importance of addressing climate change.

== Political career ==
Woodsworth was elected to Vancouver City Council in the 2002 municipal election. She was the first openly lesbian city councillor in Canada. During her tenure, she served as the Vancouver representative to the Executive of the Union of BC Municipalities and the Executive of the Lower Mainland Treaty Advisory Council and an alternate representative to the Metro Vancouver Regional District. She was not re-elected in the 2005 election, but was later re-elected to council in the 2008 municipal election.

During her time on council, Woodsworth convinced the city to join the Canadian Coalition of Municipalities Against Racism and Discrimination and establish women's, multicultural and LGTBQI Council Advisory Committees. She co-chaired the Women's Task Force which wrote the first Canadian "Gender Equity Strategy", and was part of the Vancouver Council that created the Greenest City by 2020 environmental strategy.

She ran for re-election in 2011; she placed 11th with 48,557 votes and was not re-elected.

=== Call for campaign finance changes ===
After Vancouver Mayor Gregor Robertson received campaign donations from at least two American supporters, Woodsworth called for a ban on foreign campaign donations.

== Professional career ==
=== World Peace Summit ===
Woodsworth co-founded the World Peace Summit, a week-long conference bringing more than 35,000 participants to Vancouver from around the world. She was invited to Japan to speak at the support Article 9 Conference and the Hiroshima and Nagasaki Conferences against nuclear weapons.

=== Women Transforming Cities International Society ===
Woodsworth was invited by the UN to be a keynote speaker at the "Women Friendly Cities International Conference" in Ankara, Turkey. WTC is part of a five-city coalition which was launched at the Federation of Canadian Municipalities AGM in Edmonton in 2015. WTC was part of the national alliance Up for Debate 2015 calling for Federal leaders debate on women's issues and is part of the UN-Habitat 3 Urban Thinkers Campuses.

In 2016, Woodsworth was invited to speak in Prague at the EU/North American UN-Habitat 3 Regional meeting, in New York to participate in the Office of the High Commissioner on Human Rights.

She was part of the WTC panel at the Canadian Planners Institute AGM and a keynote speaker at the SFU conference on women and the environment. She was chosen as one of the 30 female top politicians in the City of Vancouver's History.

At the World Urban Forum 9 in Kuala Lumpur, she chaired the Women Transforming Cities panel which launched an online platform. She was awarded the 2018 Rosemary Brown Award for "her exemplary work to bring equality and justice for girls and women locally and globally". She chaired the Sep 11 launch of the Women Friendly Cities 2018 Hot Pink Paper Municipal Campaign in Vancouver which was endorsed by the incoming Mayor and Council.

Woodsworth was invited to join 28 people to the Global Table on Female Leadership in Resilient Societies in Udaipur, India in 2018. On May 1, 2019, she was awarded the B.C. Achievement Award and the Mitchell Award which "recognizes leadership that empowers others to engage". On May 29, 2019, she supported a motion at council to apply a gendered intersectional lens to all city departments for six years. She was a consultant and speaker at the NDI Her Story women and governance project in Iraq 2019. She has spoken at the Smart Cities Conference in Montevideo, at RailVolution, in Geneva, Berlin, Mumbai, Abu Dhabi and many conferences around the world.
