= Vision Vancouver =

Municipal political party in Canada

- Founded: 2005
- Dissolved: 2022
- Split from: Coalition of Progressive Electors
- Ideology: Green liberalism
- Political position: Centre to centre-left
- Colours: Blue, green

Website
- www.votevision.ca

Vision Vancouver was a green liberal municipal political party in Vancouver, British Columbia, Canada. Vision was formed in the months leading up to the 2005 municipal election.

== Formation ==
Vision was founded by former Coalition of Progressive Electors (COPE) members first elected to Vancouver City Council in 2002. Following that election, Mayor Larry Campbell and Councillors Jim Green, Raymond Louie and Tim Stevenson were dubbed "COPE Light" by the local media due to their moderate positions on taxation and development, as opposed to the more leftist "COPE Classic" councillors.

Ongoing disagreements between the two factions led to Campbell and his allies forming an independent COPE caucus in December 2004. At the same time, supporters of Campbell and his allies created a fundraising organization independent of COPE called "Friends of Larry Campbell".

This group and its backers eventually formed a new party called "Vision Vancouver", initially to be led by Campbell. However, when Campbell announced that he would not seek a second term as mayor, he called on Jim Green to run to succeed him. The party decided in August 2005 to run only five of a possible ten council candidates and did not contest school board and park board slate elections.

In the November 2005 election for Vancouver City Council, four Vision Vancouver candidates (Raymond Louie, Tim Stevenson, Heather Deal and George Chow) were elected, but the party's mayoral candidate, Jim Green, was defeated by the Non-Partisan Association's (NPA) Sam Sullivan. Six members of the Non-Partisan Association were elected along with one for COPE.

== In power (2008–2018) ==
For the November 2008 election, Vision was seen as a serious contender for control of the city due to the perceived unpopularity of the Sam Sullivan's NPA team. In June 2008, Vision held an election to nominate their mayoral candidate. The choices were Gregor Robertson (a local "green" businessman, owner of the Happy Planet juice company and a provincial New Democratic Party member of the Legislative Assembly for Vancouver-Fairview), Raymond Louie (serving as a Vision city councillor), and Allan De Genova (an independent Vancouver Park Board commissioner who defected from the NPA because of his dislike of Sullivan's leadership). The original dynamic for this contest shifted when the NPA voted to change their mayoral candidate, replacing the incumbent Sullivan with longtime councillor and businessman Peter Ladner, the editor of the Business in Vancouver newspaper. Gregor Robertson was nominated to be Vision's mayoral candidate in 2008 despite his perceived similarity to NPA rival Sam Sullivan.

Under the direction of mayoral candidate Gregor Robertson, Vision Vancouver responded to COPE's requests (dating back to a change in leadership at COPE in May 2007) to negotiate an electoral coalition with COPE and the Green Party of Vancouver (who ran joint slates with COPE in previous years). Vision Vancouver, COPE and the Greens agreed to support Gregor Robertson as mayor, avoid running competing slates and coordinate other elements of the election.

On November 15, 2008, Gregor Robertson was elected mayor of Vancouver and the Vision–COPE–Green coalition came to power. The only Vision Vancouver candidate who was not elected was Kashmir Dhalliwal.

In the 2011 Vancouver municipal election, held on November 19, Gregor Robertson was re-elected mayor of Vancouver. All Vision Vancouver candidates were elected.

In the 2014 election, held on November 15, Gregor Robertson was re-elected mayor of Vancouver. The slate also retained its majority on city council, the school board, and the park board. In 2017, Vision lost one seat on council in a by-election to Hector Bremner of the NPA.

Vision ran a slate of candidates in the 2018 election – including Heather Deal, Catherine Evans, Diego Cardona, Tanya Paz and Wei Qiao Zhang – for city council. Ian Campbell was intended to be the slate's mayoral candidate, but several days before nominations were due, he withdrew from the race. The election resulted in Vision losing their majority on all three elected bodies and losing all but one race, for a seat on the Vancouver School Board which was held by incumbent Allan Wong.

Vision was deregistered as an elector organization following the 2022 elections, where they failed to win any seats on the city council, school board, and park board.

== Electoral results ==
Mayoral
Election year	Candidate	Votes	%	Position	Result
2005	Jim Green	57,796	44.45	2nd	Not elected
2008	Gregor Robertson	67,598	54.39	▲1st	Elected
2011	Gregor Robertson	77,005	53.17	1st	Elected
2014	Gregor Robertson	83,529	45.97	1st	Elected
2018	None	–	–	–	Did not contest
2022	Endorsed Kennedy Stewart (Forward Together)	49,593	29.48	▼2nd	Not elected

Vancouver City Council
Election	Seats	+/–	Votes	%	Change (pp)	Position
2005	4 / 11	▲4	251,772	23.23	Steady	Opposition
2008	8 / 11	▲4	464,122	44.67	▲21.44	Majority government
2011	8 / 11	Steady	413,860	34.36	▼10.31	Majority government
2014	7 / 11	▼1	462,384	31.82	▼2.54	Majority government
2017 (Note: Due to it being a by-election, voters were only asked to elect one councillor.)	6 / 11	▼1	5,411	11.26	▼20.56	Majority government
2018	0 / 11	▼6	137,786	9.84	▼1.42	No seats
2022	0 / 11	Steady	33,766	2.51	▼7.33	No seats

== See also ==
- List of mayors of Vancouver
