= 2025 Vancouver City Council by-election =

Canadian municipal by-election

- April 5, 2025

2 vacant seats for Vancouver City Council
- Registered: 450,503
- Turnout: 15.09% (▲4.1pp) (Note: Increase from previous by-election in 2017); 67,962
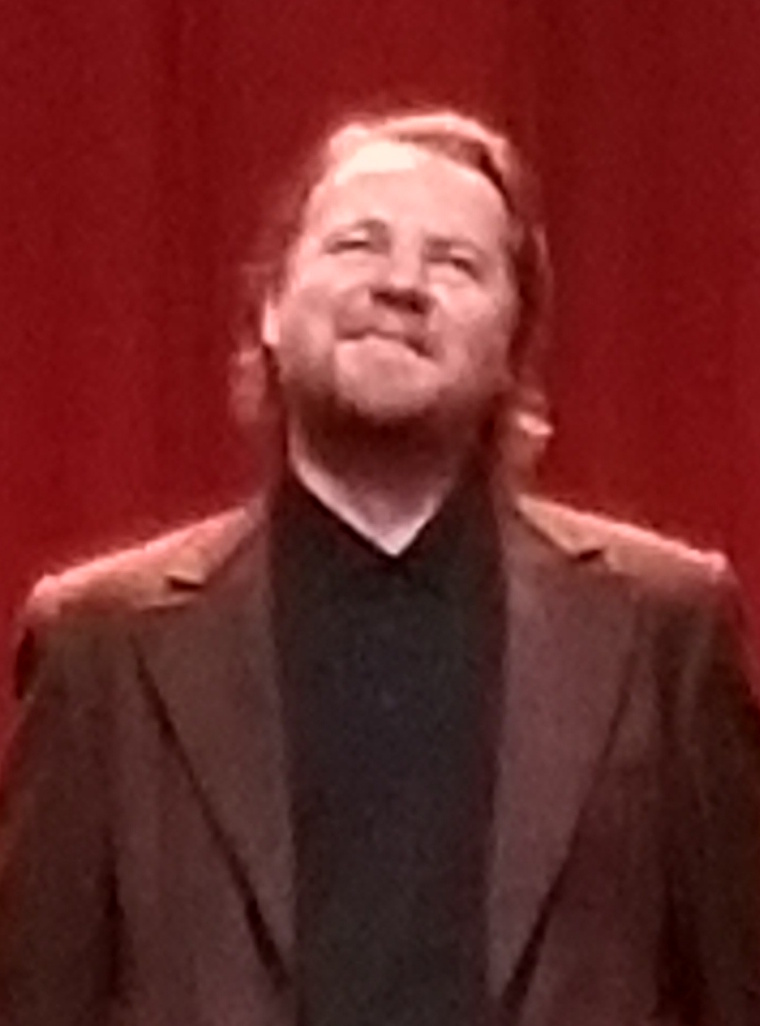

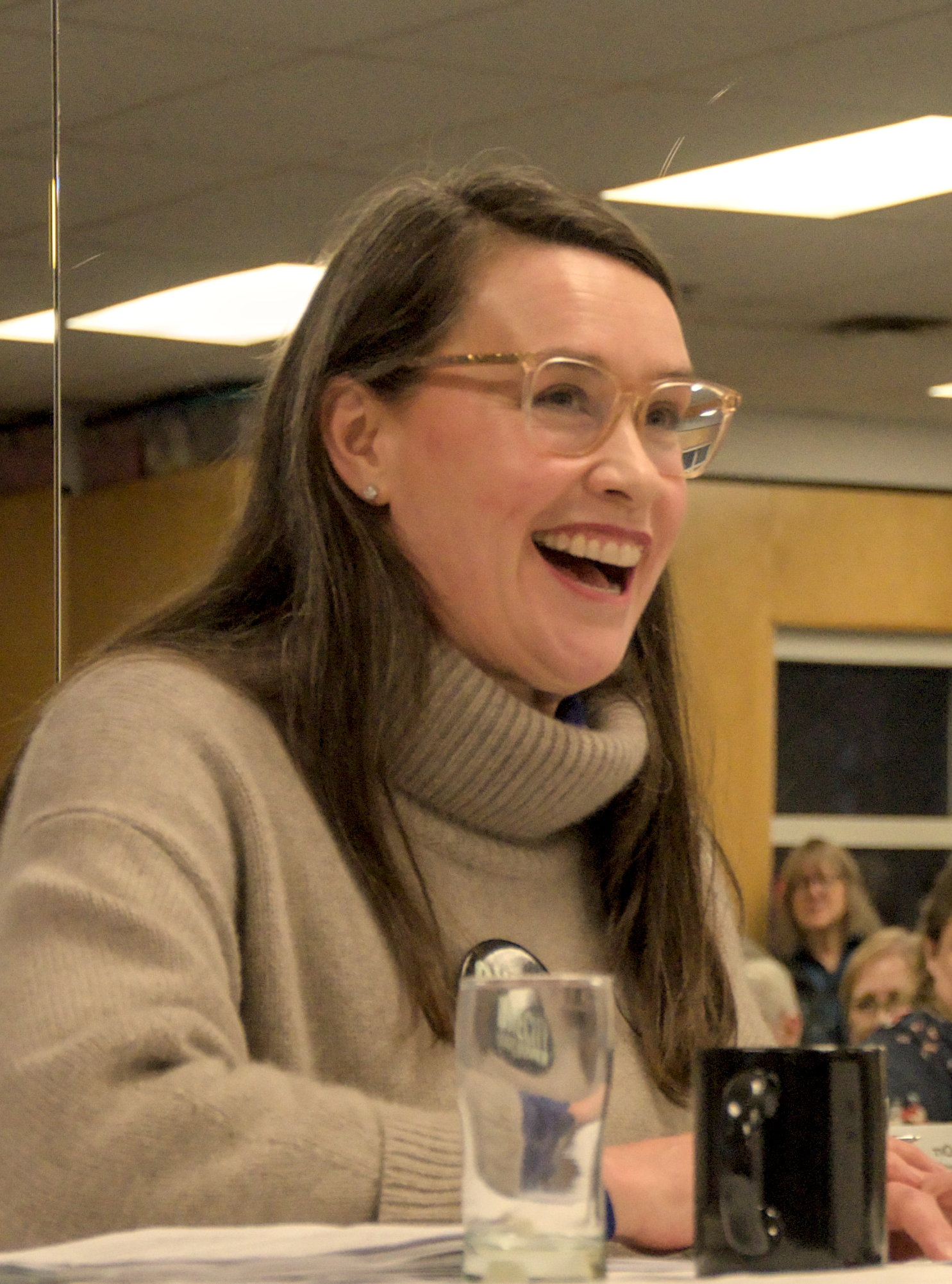

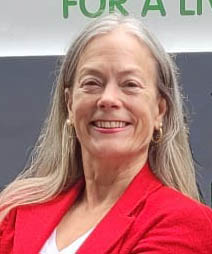
	First party	Second party	Third party
Candidate	Sean Orr	Lucy Maloney	Colleen Hardwick
Party	COPE	OneCity	TEAM
Popular vote	34,448	33,732	17,352
Percentage	50.69%	49.63%	25.53%
Percentage of votes cast	25.92%	25.38%	13.05%
	Fourth party	Fifth party	Sixth party
	Green	TEAM	ABC
Candidate	Annette Reilly	Theodore Abbott	Jaime Stein
Party	Green	TEAM	ABC Vancouver
Popular vote	15,045	11,581	9,267
Percentage	22.14%	17.04%	13.64%
Percentage of votes cast	11.32%	8.71%	6.97%
	Seventh party
	ABC
Candidate	Ralph Kaisers
Party	ABC Vancouver
Popular vote	8,915
Percentage	13.12%
Percentage of votes cast	6.71%
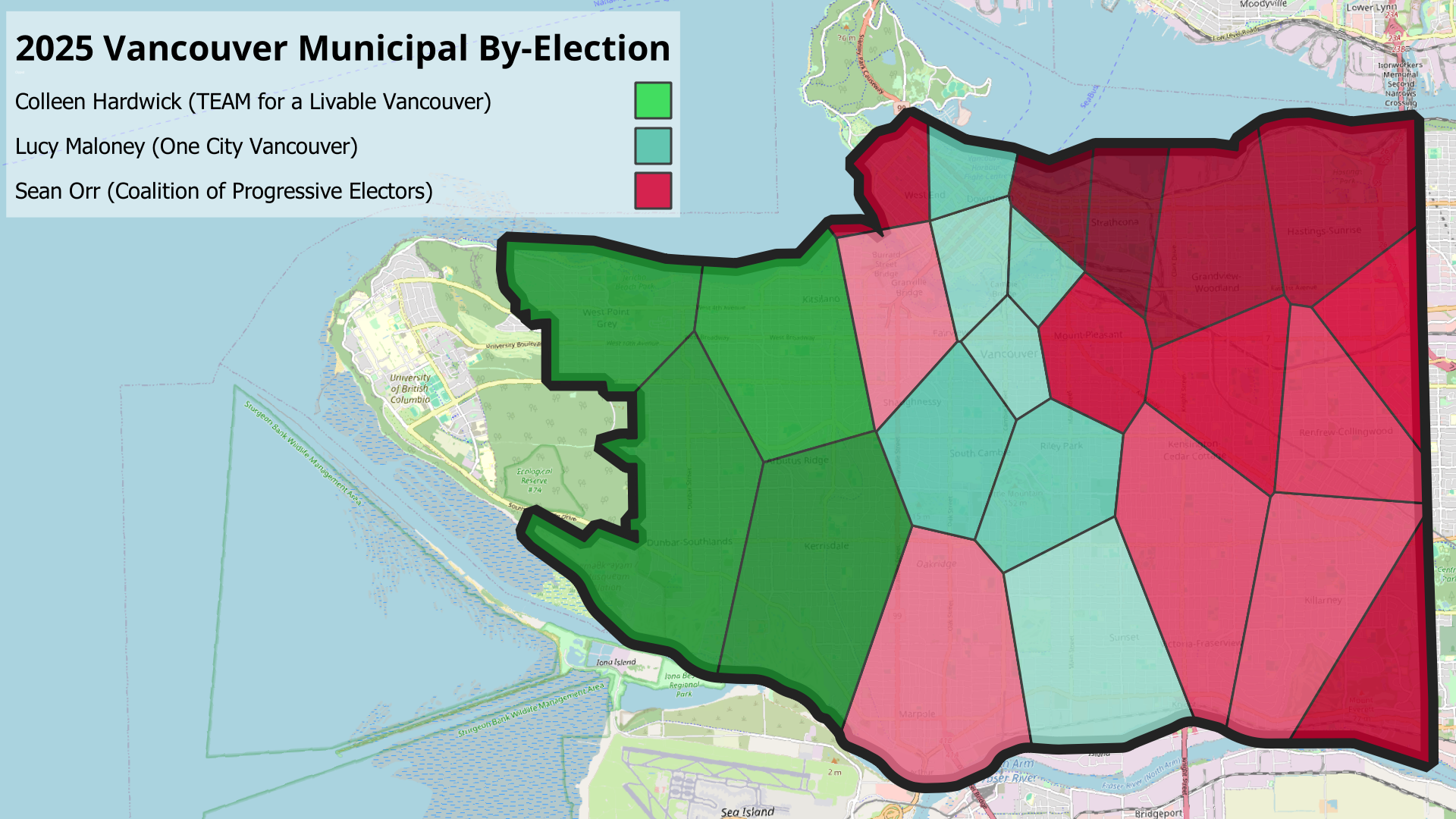
- Election as a Voronoi diagram
Councillors before election
- Christine Boyle (OneCity)
- Adriane Carr (Green)
Elected councillors
- Sean Orr (COPE)
- Lucy Maloney (OneCity)
- Seat change summary
Party	Seats	+/–
ABC Vancouver	7	0
COPE	1	+1
OneCity	1	0
Independent	1	0
Green	1	−1
This lists parties that won seats. See the complete results below.

A municipal by-election was held in Vancouver, British Columbia, on April 5, 2025, to fill two vacant seats on Vancouver City Council following the resignations of Christine Boyle and Adriane Carr.

The by-election was notable due to record voter turnout for a Vancouver municipal by-election. In a rebuke of incumbent mayor Ken Sim's ABC Vancouver, the two vacant seats were won by progressive candidates. OneCity Vancouver's Lucy Maloney retained a seat for the party, while COPE's Sean Orr gained a seat for the party and helped it return to city council for the first time since 2022. The Green Party of Vancouver failed to keep a second seat on council.

== Background ==
=== Christine Boyle ===
Christine Boyle was first elected to Vancouver City Council in the 2018 Vancouver municipal election and was the first OneCity Vancouver politician to be elected as a city councillor.

Prior to the 2024 British Columbia general election, she sought the British Columbia New Democratic Party nomination for the newly established Vancouver riding of Vancouver-Little Mountain and eventually won the seat in the provincial election on October 19, 2024. Although there is no law in British Columbia prohibiting members of the Legislative Assembly of British Columbia from holding municipal government offices, it is common for them to resign from their previous municipal positions to focus more on their provincial government duties. After being elected as an MLA, she announced her intention to resign from city council and formally did so on December 12, 2024.

=== Adriane Carr ===
Adriane Carr, the former leader of the Green Party of British Columbia, was first elected to Vancouver City Council in the 2011 Vancouver municipal election as a member of the Green Party of Vancouver. Carr was the party's first elected city councilor and was re-elected in 2014, 2018, and 2022.

Carr officially resigned from Vancouver City Council on January 15, 2025, stating that she had become increasingly frustrated with the governing style of the incumbent ABC Vancouver mayor and councillors, especially their decision to remove Carr and fellow Green councillor Pete Fry from their external positions on the Metro Vancouver board of directors. She also cited a desire to retire from politics to spend more time with her family.

As the by-election for Christine Boyle's seat was not yet scheduled at the time of Carr's resignation, it was determined that candidates would be elected to both seats in a single by-election.

== Timeline ==
- December 12, 2024 – Resignation of Christine Boyle
- January 15, 2025 – Resignation of Adriane Carr
- January 21, 2025 – Electoral timeline approved by city council
- February 18, 2025 – Candidate nomination period begins
- February 28, 2025 – Candidate nomination period ends
- March 8, 2025 – Mail ballot packages available
- March 26, 2025 – Advance voting (city hall only)
- April 1, 2025 – Advance voting (city hall only)
- April 5, 2025 – General voting day
- April 9, 2025 – Declaration of official election results
- April 15, 2025 – Elected candidates sworn in as city councillors

== Candidates ==
=== ABC Vancouver ===
ABC Vancouver announced Ralph Kaisers and Jaime Stein as the party's two candidates in the by-election on February 20, 2025. Prior to the election, Kaisers served as president of the Vancouver Police Union, while Stein was nominated as a BC United candidate in the 2024 British Columbia general election, before the party suspended its campaign.

=== COPE ===
On February 2, 2025, the Coalition of Progressive Electors nominated Sean Orr as their candidate in the by-election. Orr previously ran for city council during the 2022 Vancouver municipal election as part of VOTE Socialist.

=== Green Party ===
On February 6, 2025, the Green Party of Vancouver announced filmmaker and actress Annette Reilly as their candidate in the by-election.

=== OneCity ===
On January 28, 2025, OneCity Vancouver announced Lucy Maloney, a longtime cycling activist, as their candidate for the by-election.

=== TEAM for a Livable Vancouver ===
On January 20, 2025, former Vancouver City Councilor Colleen Hardwick of TEAM for a Livable Vancouver announced the party's intention to nominate two candidates for the by-election. On February 1, 2025, the party nominated Hardwick and Theodore Abbott to run in the election.

=== Independent candidates ===
As of the end of the nomination deadline on February 28, 2025, the following independent candidates registered to run in the by-election:

- Jeanifer Decena
- Guy Dubé
- Charles Ling
- Karin Litzcke – dietitian and education advocate, Conservative Party of British Columbia candidate in the 2023 Vancouver-Mount Pleasant provincial by-election
- Gerry McGuire – business owner who ran for mayor in the 2011 Vancouver election
- Rollergirl

== Endorsements ==
Lucy Maloney (OneCity)

Former and current members of Parliament

- Libby Davies, MP for Vancouver East (1997–2015)
- Jenny Kwan, MP for Vancouver East (2015–present)

Former and current members of the Legislative Assembly of British Columbia

- Christine Boyle, MLA for Vancouver-Little Mountain (2024–present)
- Joan Phillip, MLA for Vancouver-Strathcona (2024–2026), Vancouver-Mount Pleasant (2023–2024)

Municipal politicians

- Patrick Johnstone, mayor of New Westminster (2022–present)
- Peter Ladner, Vancouver city councillor (2002–2008)
- Andrea Reimer, Vancouver city councillor (2008–2018) (co-endorsement with Orr)

Organizations

- Vancouver and District Labour Council (co-endorsement with Reilly)
- Vision Zero Vancouver
Sean Orr (COPE)

Former and current members of Parliament

- Svend Robinson, MP for Burnaby (1979–1988), Burnaby—Kingsway (1988–1997), Burnaby—Douglas (1997–2004)

Former and current members of the Legislative Assembly of British Columbia

- Katrina Chen, MLA for Burnaby-Lougheed (2017–2022)
- Harold Steves, MLA for Richmond (1972–1975)

Municipal politicians

- Andrea Reimer, Vancouver city councillor (2008–2018) (co-endorsement with Maloney)
- Jean Swanson, Vancouver city councillor (2018–2022)

Other prominent individuals

- Gabor Maté, activist, physician, and Member of the Order of Canada
Annette Reilly (Green Party)

Organizations

- Vancouver and District Labour Council (co-endorsement with Maloney)

== Results ==
The election used a plurality at-large voting system, with the top two candidates winning election to city council.

Vancouver municipal by-election, April 5, 2025: Vancouver City Council Resignation of Christine Boyle and Adriane Carr
Party	Candidate	Votes	%	Elected
COPE	Sean Orr	34,448	50.69	✓
OneCity	Lucy Maloney	33,732	49.63	✓
TEAM	Colleen Hardwick	17,352	25.53	
Green	Annette Reilly	15,045	22.14	
TEAM	Theodore Abbott	11,581	17.04	
ABC Vancouver	Jaime Stein	9,267	13.64	
ABC Vancouver	Ralph Kaisers	8,915	13.12	
Independent	Jeanifer Decena	652	0.96	
Independent	Guy Dubé	459	0.68	
Independent	Karin Litzcke	433	0.64	
Independent	Rollergirl	404	0.59	
Independent	Charles Ling	352	0.52	
Independent	Gerry McGuire	276	0.41	
Total number of voters		67,962	100.00	
Rejected ballots		0	0.00	
Turnout		67,962	15.09	
Eligible voters		450,503	–	
Percentage of votes shown is percentage of voters who voted, not votes cast.
Source: City of Vancouver
