= Lucy Maloney =

Canadian politician and road safety advocate

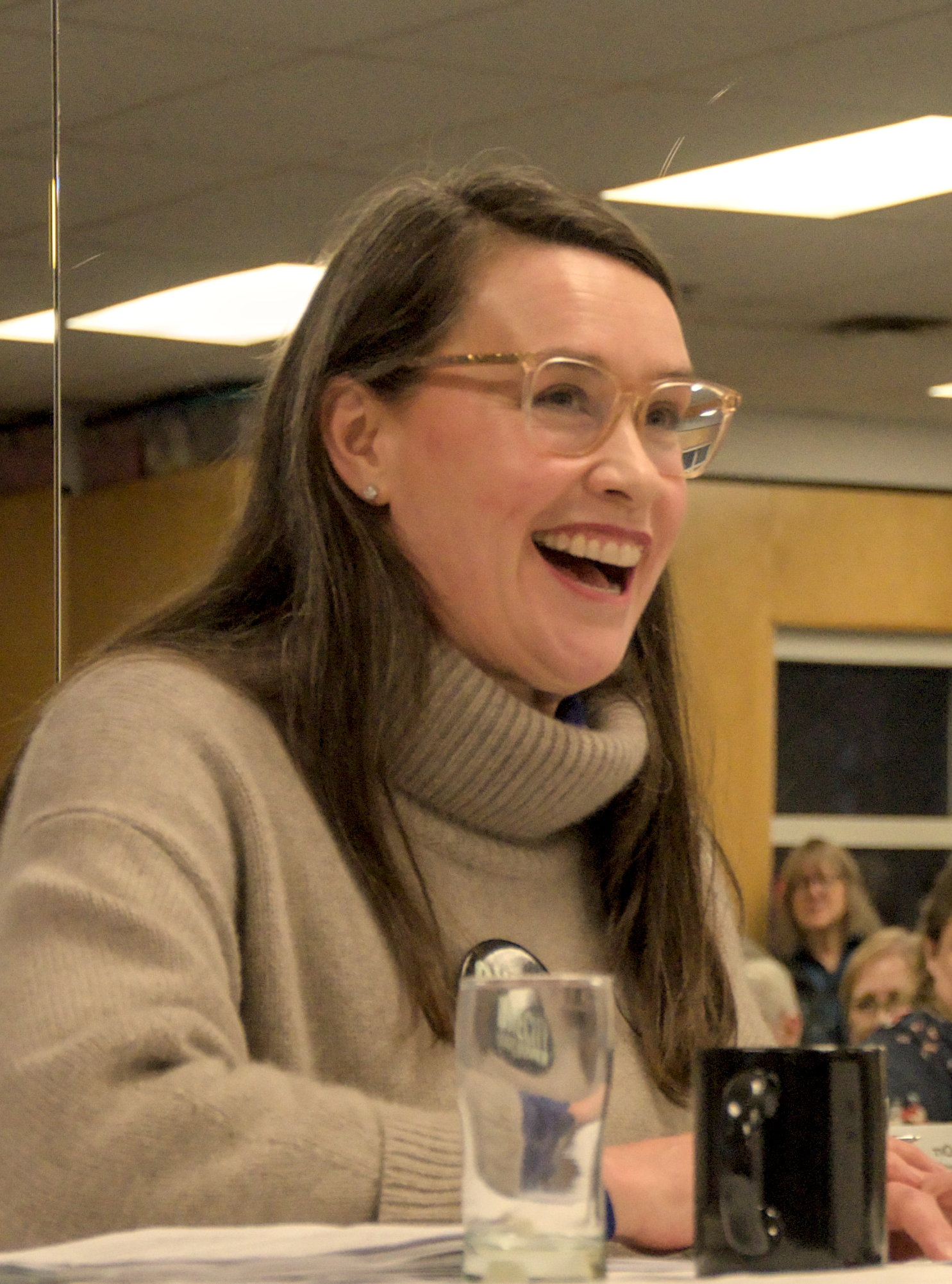
- Maloney in 2025

Vancouver City Councillor
- Incumbent
- Assumed office April 15, 2025

Personal details
- Born: Melbourne, Victoria, Australia
- Party: OneCity

Lucy Maloney is a Canadian politician and road safety advocate who has served on Vancouver City Council since being elected in the 2025 Vancouver City Council by-election.

== Biography ==
Lucy Maloney was born in Melbourne, Victoria, Australia. She studied law and arts (environmental science) in university and obtained a law degree and an MBA. Maloney worked as a lawyer for the Victoria State State Environment Protection Authority. After ten years at the EPA, she worked for BHP Billiton Worsley Alumina’s Sourcing and Contracts team.

Maloney then moved to Singapore while still working for BHP as a risk management specialist for the Minerals Exploration team. She completed her MBA in 2011.

After briefly living in Santiago, Chile, Maloney and her family moved to Vancouver in 2017, where she resides with her husband and two children in the West End neighbourhood. In Vancouver, Maloney chaired the Lord Roberts Elementary School Parent Advisory Committee, with a focus on safe routes for children to get to school. She was a volunteer with the road safety advocacy group Vision Zero Vancouver.

== Politics ==
Following the resignation of Vancouver councillors Christine Boyle and Adriane Carr in late 2024, Maloney secured the nomination of OneCity Vancouver and ran in the 2025 by-election to fill one of the two vacant council seats. She was elected, finishing with 49.63% or second place in voting with 33,732 votes. In council, she has continued to advocate for pro-housing policies and road safety.

== Electoral record ==
2026 Vancouver municipal election: Vancouver City Council
Party	Candidate	Votes	%	Elected
COPE	Sean Orr (X)	83,038	5.02	✓
Green	Annette Reilly	78,476	4.75	✓
COPE	Chloe Leslie	67,791	4.10	✓
COPE	Devyani Singh	65,473	3.96	✓
Green	Stephanie Smith	64,070	3.88	✓
OneCity	Lucy Maloney (X)	63,143	3.82	✓
Green	Camil Dumont	62,540	3.78	✓
COPE	Solomon Yi-Kieran	60,361	3.65	✓
ABC Vancouver	Mike Klassen (X)	57,798	3.50	✓
Green	Bridget Burns	57,788	3.50	✓
ABC Vancouver	Joyce Gillespie	54,981	3.33	
ABC Vancouver	Peter Meiszner (X)	54,507	3.30	
ABC Vancouver	Sarah Kirby-Yung (X)	54,453	3.29	
ABC Vancouver	Lisa Dominato (X)	54,446	3.29	
OneCity	Iona Bonamis	54,366	3.29	
OneCity	Frances Bula	51,498	3.12	
ABC Vancouver	Lenny Zhou (X)	49,874	3.02	
OneCity	Jarrett Hagglund	48,798	2.95	
OneCity	Caitlin Stockwell	48,715	2.95	
ABC Vancouver	Lorraine Lowe	48,095	2.91	
ABC Vancouver	David Grewal	48,086	2.91	
ABC Vancouver	Arezo Zarrabian	44,008	2.66	
Liberal	Victoria Jung	23,791	1.44	
TEAM	Kathleen Larsen	23,141	1.40	
TEAM	Amanda Boggan	22,303	1.35	
TEAM	Charles Kelly	21,895	1.32	
TEAM	Josh Gordon	21,294	1.29	
Liberal	Moira Stilwell	20,844	1.26	
TEAM	Jonathan Weisman	19,746	1.19	
Liberal	Jessica Walton	18,970	1.15	
Liberal	John Coupar	17,362	1.05	
Vote Vancouver	Rebecca Hasdell	17,043	1.03	
TEAM	Raj Mundra	16,177	0.98	
Liberal	Michael Wu	15,748	0.95	
TEAM	Patrick Sauriol	15,356	0.93	
Liberal	Devin Clemens	14,373	0.87	
Liberal	Armor Valor	14,270	0.86	
Vote Vancouver	Geoff Teoli	11,086	0.67	
Vote Vancouver	John Boychuk	9,945	0.60	
Affordable Housing	Eric Redmond	9,543	0.58	
Vote Vancouver	Keerit Jutla	8,974	0.54	
Vote Vancouver	Steve Jedreicich	8,438	0.51	
Vote Vancouver	Bhavna Solecki	7,201	0.44	
Bright Future	Andy Lin	6,122	0.37	
Independent	John Jones	5,088	0.31	
Independent	Rollergirl	4,910	0.30	
Independent	Job Zhao	3,731	0.23	
Bright Future	Yadwinder Mangat	3,613	0.22	
Bright Future	Judith Kasiama	3,568	0.22	
TrueBlue	Naomi Chocyk	3,566	0.22	
Bright Future	Bilal Khan	2,989	0.18	
Independent	Guy Dubé	2,231	0.13	
Independent	Parris J. Williams	2,229	0.13	
Bright Future	Mohadeseh Gharib P. Arasi	2,185	0.13	
Bright Future	Ibrahima Cisse	2,122	0.13	
Independent	Noi Soudarack	838	0.05	
