= Melanie Mark =

Canadian politician

- Hli Haykwhl Ẃii Xsgaak
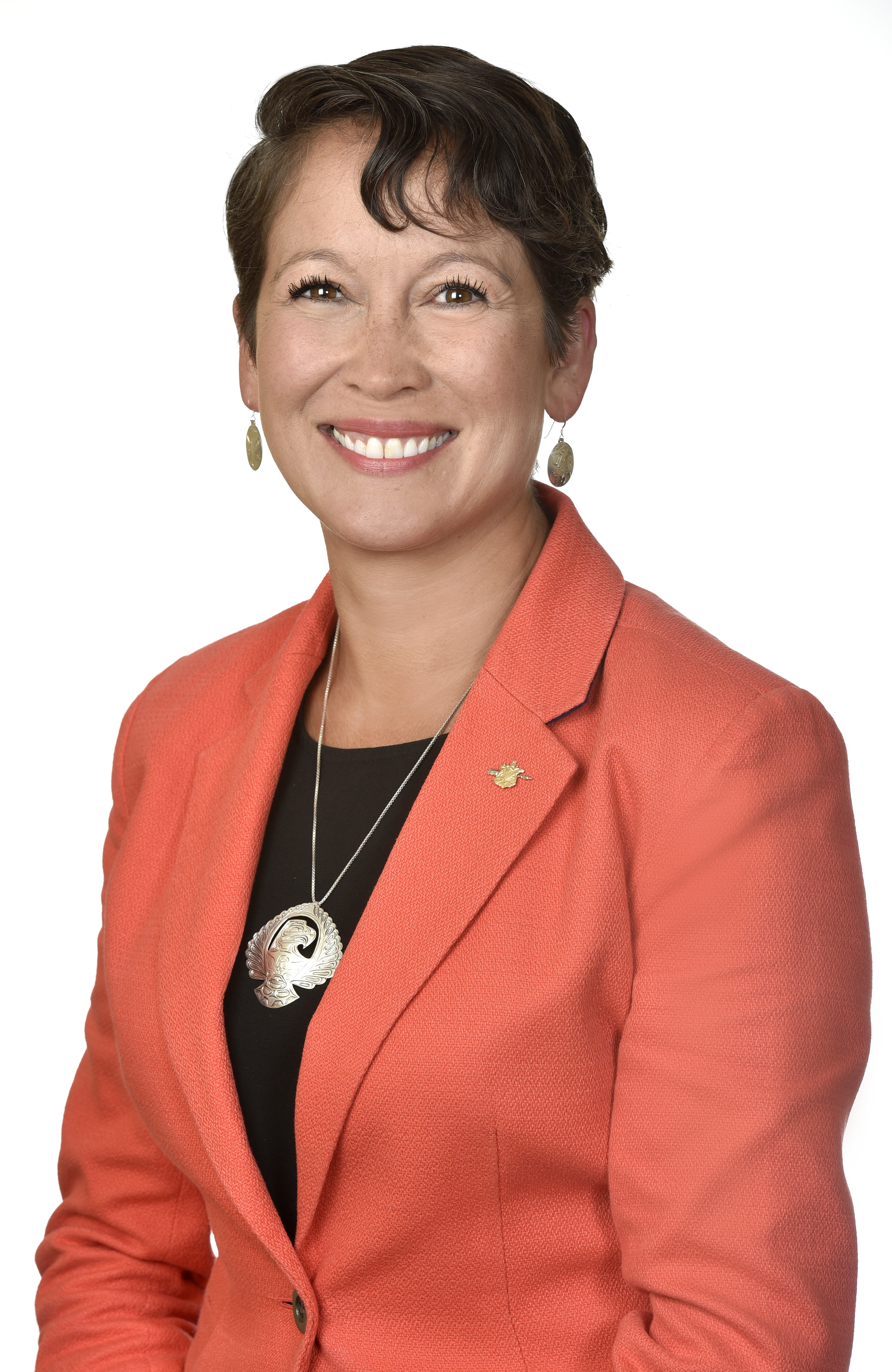

Minister without Portfolio
- In office September 28, 2022 – April 14, 2023
- Premier: John Horgan; David Eby
- Preceded by: Position established
- Succeeded by: Position abolished

Minister of Tourism, Arts, Culture and Sport of British Columbia
- In office November 26, 2020 – September 28, 2022
- Premier: John Horgan
- Preceded by: Lisa Beare (Tourism, Arts and Culture)
- Succeeded by: Lisa Beare

Minister of Advanced Education and Skills Training of British Columbia
- In office July 18, 2017 – November 26, 2020
- Premier: John Horgan
- Preceded by: Linda Reid (Advanced Education); Shirley Bond (Jobs, Tourism and Skills Training)
- Succeeded by: Anne Kang

Member of the British Columbia Legislative Assembly for Vancouver-Mount Pleasant
- In office February 2, 2016 – April 14, 2023
- Preceded by: Jenny Kwan
- Succeeded by: Joan Phillip

Personal details
- Born: 1975 (age 50–51)
- Party: New Democrat
- Children: 2
- Education: Simon Fraser University

Melanie Joy Mark (born 1975), also known by her Nisga'a name Hli Haykwhl Ẃii Xsgaak, is a Canadian politician in the province of British Columbia. A member of the New Democratic Party (NDP), she served as the Member of the Legislative Assembly (MLA) for Vancouver-Mount Pleasant from 2016 to 2023. She was Minister of Advanced Education and Skills Training from 2017 to 2020, and Minister of Tourism, Arts, Culture and Sport from 2020 to 2022. Mark is the first First Nations woman elected to the Legislative Assembly of British Columbia, and the first First Nations woman to serve in the Cabinet of British Columbia. On February 22, 2023, Mark announced her intention to resign as MLA and cabinet minister; her resignation took effect April 14 of the same year.

== Background ==
Born of Nisga'a, Gitxsan, Cree, and Ojibwe ancestry, Mark was raised in Vancouver's Downtown Eastside neighbourhood. She credits her aunts and grandparents with helping her get through the death of her younger brother who was killed by a semi trailer while riding a bicycle, her mother's addiction and homelessness, and her father's overdose.

After attending six different high schools, including Van Tech, Charles Tupper, and Ladysmith, she became the first person in her family to graduate from high school and attend college and university. She received a diploma in criminology from a joint program offered by Native Education College and Douglas College, then went on to major in political science and minor in sociology at Simon Fraser University (SFU), earning a Bachelor of Arts degree in 2005. She also received an advanced executive certificate from Queen's School of Business. She worked with the Native Court Workers' Association, Covenant House, the Royal Canadian Mounted Police in Hazelton as a summer student, and as the national aboriginal project coordinator for Save the Children Canada's Sacred Lives Project.

From 2000 to 2006, Mark served as president of the Urban Native Youth Association. She is the co-founder of the Vancouver Aboriginal Community Policing Centre. Beginning in 2007, she worked for eight years in the Office of the Representative for Children and Youth, becoming an associate deputy representative in 2013. The Office is the supporting agency for the Representative for Children and Youth, a non-partisan officer of the BC Legislature reporting directly to the BC Legislative Assembly, mandated to advocate for young people and families going through the provincial child and youth welfare system.

In 2006, Mark received the YWCA Vancouver Young Woman of Distinction Award, and in 2015, she received the Chief Joe Mathias Leadership Award from the Native Education College. In 2016, she was the recipient of the inaugural Janusz Korczak Medal for Children's Rights Advocacy and in 2018, she was the recipient of the Stenberg College, Be the Change, Community Leadership Award.

Mark has attention deficit hyperactivity disorder (ADHD).

== Politics ==
After Jenny Kwan announced she would be resigning as MLA of Vancouver-Mount Pleasant to stand in the 2015 federal election, Melanie Mark entered the nomination contest to be the NDP's candidate for the ensuing by-election. On June 14, 2015, she defeated Diana Day for the NDP nomination. When the by-election was held on February 2, 2016, Mark was elected with 61% of the vote, defeating Liberal candidate Gavin Dew and Green candidate Pete Fry; she became the first Indigenous woman elected to the Legislature of British Columbia. She was re-elected in the 2017 general election, and was named Minister of Advanced Education that July in the NDP minority government.

As Minister of Advanced Education, Skills and Training, Mark oversaw policy changes that made college and university more accessible to more British Columbians. She created the Provincial Tuition Waiver program, which supports youth in and from the foster system to access post secondary education tuition free. She oversaw the creation of the B.C. Access Grant, which provides upfront, non-repayable financial assistance to low- and middle-income students enrolled in full-time studies at B.C. colleges and universities, as well as the elimination of fees for Adult Basic Education and English language learning programs and interest on provincial student loans.

Following the 2020 election, Mark was named the Minister of Tourism, Arts, Culture and Sport on November 26. On September 28, 2022, Mark announced that she would step down from cabinet in order to take medical leave, and was appointed a minister without portfolio.

On February 22, 2023, Mark announced her resignation as MLA and cabinet minister. In her resignation speech, Mark criticized how "institutions fundamentally resist change ... particularly colonial institutions and government at large," and said that she would "continue to advocate and fight from outside of this House." Mark described the legislature as a "torture chamber" and the opposition as "absolutely awful", adding, "the nastiness from white men in here is awful." A by-election to replace Mark took place on June 24, 2023.

== Electoral record ==
2020 British Columbia general election: Vancouver-Mount Pleasant
Party	Candidate	Votes	%	±%	Expenditures
New Democratic	Melanie Mark	14,530	66.95	+1.63	$22,210.72
Green	Kelly Tatham	4,356	20.07	+3.14	$5,570.94
Liberal	George Vassilas	2,816	12.98	−3.06	$8,413.63
Total valid votes		21,702	99.03	–	
Total rejected ballots		212	0.97	−0.07	
Turnout		21,914	48.01	−9.61	
Registered voters		45,644			
New Democratic hold		Swing		−0.76	
Source: Elections BC

2017 British Columbia general election: Vancouver-Mount Pleasant
Party	Candidate	Votes	%	±%	Expenditures
New Democratic	Melanie Mark	15,962	65.33	+5.18	$40,109
Green	Jerry Kroll	4,136	16.93	−10.15	$68,641
Liberal	Conny Lin	3,917	16.03	+4.74	$32,647
Independent	Mike Hansen	212	0.87	–	$30
Communist	Peter Marcus	135	0.55	–	$0
Your Political Party	Shai Joseph Mor	72	0.29	−0.36	$85
Total valid votes		24,434	98.96	–	
Total rejected ballots		256	1.04	+0.57	
Turnout		24,690	57.62	+34.45	
Registered voters		42,848			
New Democratic hold		Swing		+7.67	
Source: Elections BC

British Columbia provincial by-election, February 2, 2016: Vancouver-Mount Pleasant Resignation of Jenny Kwan
Party	Candidate	Votes	%	±%	Expenditures
New Democratic	Melanie Mark	5,627	60.14	−5.69	$71,603
Green	Pete Fry	2,533	27.07	+15.16	$29,065
Liberal	Gavin Dew	1,056	11.29	−7.46	$66,547
Libertarian	Bonnie Boya Hu	79	0.84	–	$250
Your Political Party	Jeremy Gustafson	61	0.65	–	$454
Total valid votes		9,356	99.53	–	
Total rejected ballots		44	0.47	−0.51	
Turnout		9,400	23.17	−26.60	
Registered voters		40,561			
New Democratic hold		Swing		−10.42	

British Columbia provincial government of John Horgan
Cabinet posts (2)
Predecessor	Office	Successor
Lisa Beare	Minister of Tourism, Arts, Culture and Sport; November 26, 2020 – September 28, 2022	Lisa Beare
Linda Reid; Shirley Bond	Minister of Advanced Education and Skills Training; July 18, 2017 – November 26, 2020	Anne Kang
