= Amanda Burrows =

Canadian politician

Amanda Burrows MLA

Member of the Legislative Assembly for Vancouver-Strathcona
- Incumbent
- Assumed office October 24, 2026
- Preceded by: Joan Phillip

Personal details
- Party: New Democratic
- Other political affiliations: OneCity Vancouver

Amanda Burrows MLA is a Canadian politician who was elected the member of the British Columbia Legislative Assembly for Vancouver-Strathcona at the 2026 British Columbia general election. She is the executive director of the First United Church and has worked for nonprofits. Burrows was previously a candidate for the OneCity Vancouver nomination for mayor of Vancouver.

== Electoral record ==
2026 British Columbia general election: Vancouver-Strathcona
** Preliminary results — Not yet official **
Party	Candidate	Votes	%	±%
New Democratic	Amanda Burrows	10,684	54.54	
Green	Tanya Webking	5,680	29.00	
Conservative	Jordan Zheng McIntosh (Note: Removed by the party after the candidate deadline, but will remain on the ballot.)	2,878	14.69	
Communist	Robert Crooks	245	1.25	
Total valid votes		19,487	99.48	
Total rejected ballots		101	0.52	
Turnout		19,588		
Registered voters				
New Democratic hold		Swing		−14.49
Source: Elections BC
