= 2026 Vancouver municipal election =

- October 17, 2026

10 seats on Vancouver City Council + 1 mayor; 9 seats on Vancouver School Board; 7 seats on Vancouver Park Board
- Turnout: 43% (▲7 pp); 209,214
- Mayoral election
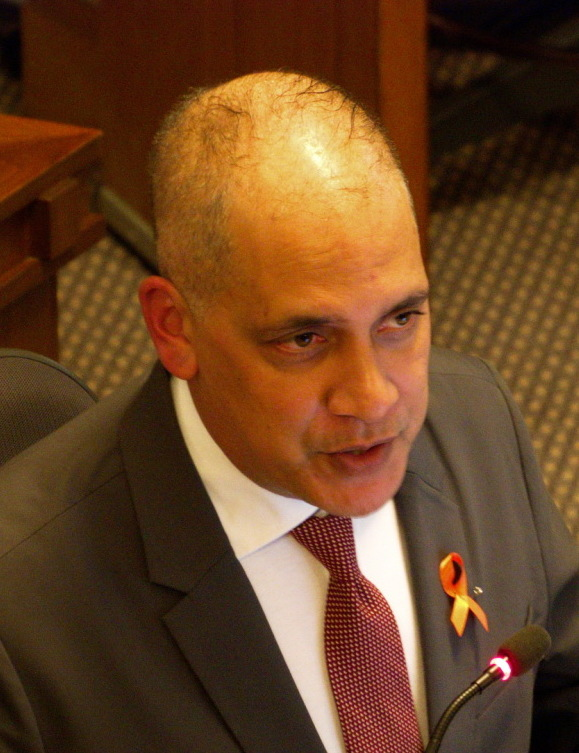

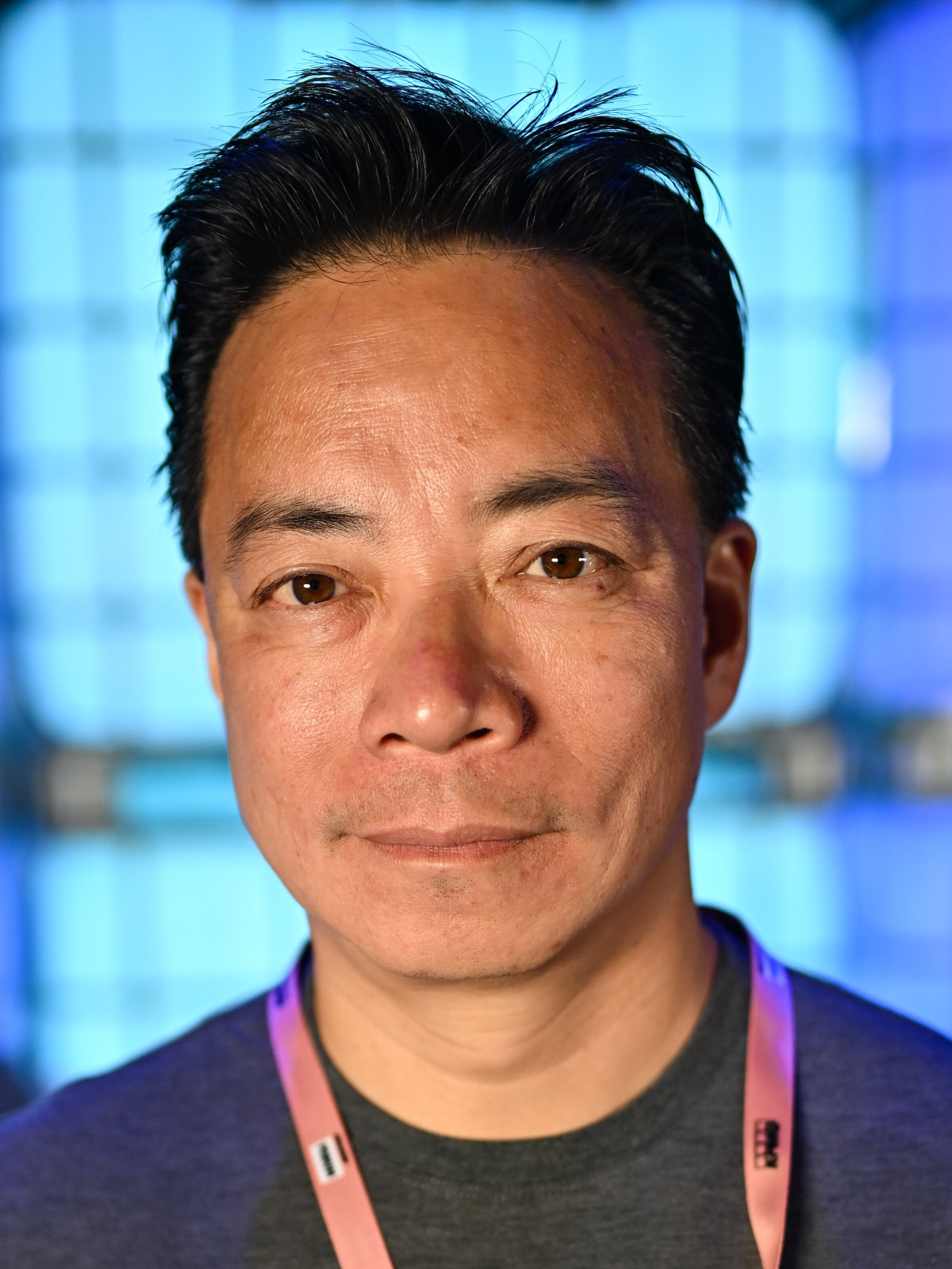

	First party	Second party
Candidate	Pete Fry	Ken Sim
Party	Green	ABC Vancouver
Alliance	COPE; OneCity
Popular vote	98,494	67,467
Percentage	47.76%	32.73%
Swing	N/A	▼18.23 pp
	Third party	Fourth party
Candidate	Colleen Hardwick	Kareem Allam
Party	TEAM	Vancouver Liberals
Popular vote	18,105	10,580
Percentage	8.78%	5.13%
Swing	▼1.19 pp	N/A
- Mayoral results on a Voronoi diagram of polling stations

- Council results on a Voronoi diagram of polling stations
Mayor before election
Ken Sim
ABC Vancouver
Mayor-elect
Pete Fry
Green
- City council election
Party	Seats	+/–
COPE	4	+3
Green	4	+3
ABC Vancouver	1	−6
OneCity	1	0
This lists parties that won seats. See the complete results below.
- Park board election
Party	Seats	+/–
COPE	4	+4
Green	3	+2
This lists parties that won seats. See the complete results below.
- School board election
Party	Seats	+/–
COPE	4	+3
OneCity	3	+2
Green	2	0
This lists parties that won seats. See the complete results below.

The 2026 Vancouver municipal election was held on October 17, 2026, on the same day as the municipal elections held throughout British Columbia. Voters elected the mayor of Vancouver along with 10 city councillors, 7 park board commissioners, and 9 school board trustees through plurality-at-large voting. In addition, voters voted on three capital plan questions and two plebiscite questions related to public safety.

Incumbent mayor Ken Sim ran for re-election and was defeated by councilmember Pete Fry of the Green Party. Fry is the first Green Party candidate to win a mayoral seat in Vancouver, the only major Canadian city with a municipal Green party.

== Background ==
Ken Sim defeated incumbent mayor Kennedy Stewart in the 2022 mayoral election. Sim was elected mayor with 51% of votes cast and was sworn in on November 7, 2022. The city council, park board, and school board elections, held on the same day, had Sim's ABC Vancouver winning outright majorities on all three.

In April 2026, COPE, OneCity Vancouver and the Green Party of Vancouver reached an agreement to limit the number of candidates each party would run in the October municipal election, seeking to reduce competition among progressive candidates. Each party could nominate up to five council candidates. COPE and the Greens could each run up to four candidates for both the school board and park board, while OneCity could run five for school board and three for park board. The agreement initially allowed each party to nominate a mayoral candidate while committing them to work towards identifying a single progressive contender.

COPE's mayoral candidate, Stephanie Allen, withdrew on September 2, citing the need to unite progressive voters against incumbent mayor Ken Sim. OneCity's William Azaroff withdrew on September 8 and endorsed the Greens' Pete Fry, leaving Fry as the only mayoral candidate from the three parties.

== Mayoral election ==
=== Candidates ===
==== Declared ====
- Muhammad Ahmad, Bright Future Vancouver, communications strategist and chair of the strategic advisory board at Alpharay Consulting
- Kareem Allam, Vancouver Liberals, former chief of staff to Mayor Ken Sim
- Rebecca Bligh, Vote Vancouver, Vancouver city councillor (2018–present)
- Amauri Caliman, independent
- Pete Fry, Green Party, Vancouver city councillor (2018–present)
- Scott Gilbert, independent
- Colleen Hardwick, TEAM for a Livable Vancouver, Vancouver city councillor (2018–2022)
- Ken Sim, ABC Vancouver, incumbent mayor (2022–present)

==== Withdrawn ====
- Stephanie Allen, COPE, co-founder of Hogan's Alley Society and a former vice-president at BC Housing
- William Azaroff, OneCity Vancouver, CEO of Brightside Community Homes

==== Results ====
2026 Vancouver municipal election: Mayor
Party	Candidate	Votes	%	Elected
Green	Pete Fry	98,494	47.78	✓
ABC Vancouver	Ken Sim (incumbent)	67,467	32.73	
TEAM	Colleen Hardwick	18,105	8.78	
Liberal	Kareem Allam	10,580	5.13	
Vote Vancouver	Rebecca Bligh	8,681	4.21	
Bright Future	Muhammad Ahmad	1,352	0.66	
Independent	Scott Gilbert	1,135	0.55	
Independent	Amauri Caliman	347	0.17	
Source: CBC

=== Opinion polling ===
==== Declared candidates ====
Polling firm	Dates	Sim	Fry	Allam	Hardwick	Allen	Azaroff	Bligh	Ahmad	Other	Undecided
Canada Pulse Insights	September 28 – October 6, 2026	27%	28%	19%	13%	—N/a	—N/a	7%	3%	—N/a	
Leger	September 23–30, 2026	19%	23%	6%	6%	—N/a	—N/a	5%	—N/a	—N/a	36%
Justason	August 31 – September 11, 2026	30%	45%	10%	11%	—N/a	—N/a	5%	—N/a	—N/a	
Research Co.	August 1, 2026	30%	19%	19%	14%	4%	5%	7%	—N/a	3%	—N/a
Research Co.	August 1, 2026	22%	14%	14%	10%	3%	4%	5%	—N/a	2%	26%
Pallas Data	July 20–24, 2026	13.8%	18.1%	11.5%	10.5%	6%	3.5%	2.9%	—N/a	33.8%	

==== Potential candidates ====
Polling firm	Date last conducted	Kareem Allam, Liberal	John Coupar, Conservative	Kirk LaPointe, Conservative	Sean Orr, COPE	Pete Fry, Green	Ken Sim, ABC	Colleen Hardwick, TEAM	Tim Louis, COPE	Amanda Burrows, OneCity	Fred Harding, NPA	Rebecca Bligh, Vote Vancouver	Other	Sample size	MOE	Polling method	Lead
Mainstreet Research	October 22, 2025	13%	25%	—N/a	20%	20%	13%	4%	—N/a	2%	1%	2%	—N/a	1,207	±2.8pp	IVR	5%
Mainstreet Research	October 22, 2025	16%	—N/a	26%	17%	20%	11%	4%	—N/a	2%	1%	3%	—N/a	1,207	±2.8pp	IVR	6%
Mainstreet Research	August 29, 2025	19%	18%	—N/a	—N/a	17%	15%	6%	8%	8%	8%	—N/a	—N/a	961	±3.2pp	IVR	1%

==== Parties ====
Polling firm	Date last conducted	Conservatives	Liberals	COPE	Greens	ABC	OneCity	TEAM	Vote Vancouver	NPA	Sample size	MOE	Polling method	Lead
Mainstreet Research	October 22, 2025	32%	22%	13%	11%	8%	5%	4%	4%	2%	1,207	±2.8pp	IVR	10%

== City council elections ==
=== Candidates ===
==== Declared ====
- Mohadeseh G.P. Arasi, Bright Future Vancouver, community advocate and entrepreneur
- Amanda Boggan, TEAM for a Livable Vancouver, former president of the Downtown Eastside Neighbourhood Council
- Iona Bonamis, OneCity, City of Vancouver transportation planner
- John Boychuk, Vote Vancouver, Vancouver Pride Society co-chair and small business owner
- Frances Bula, OneCity, civic journalist
- Bridget Burns, Green Party, Green Party of Canada national field manager
- Ibrahima Cisse, Bright Future Vancouver, entrepreneur and community builder
- Devin Clemens, Vancouver Liberals, UBC graduate program manager
- John Coupar, Vancouver Liberals, former Vancouver Park Board commissioner and Conservative Party of British Columbia candidate in the 2024 British Columbia election for Vancouver-Little Mountain
- Camil Dumont, Green Party, former Vancouver Park Board commissioner (2018–2022)
- Jarrett Hagglund, OneCity, managing director of the Co-Operative Housing Federation of BC
- Rebecca Hasdell, Vote Vancouver, BC Centre for Disease Control public health scientist and University of British Columbia adjunct professor
- Steve Jedreicich, Vote Vancouver, development and acquisitions specialist
- Victoria Jung, Vancouver Liberals, Vancouver School Board trustee (2022–present)
- Keerit Jutla, Vote Vancouver, lawyer and CEO of Invicta Metals
- Judith Kasiama, Bright Future Vancouver, founder of Colour the Trails and community advocate
- Charles Kelly, TEAM for a Livable Vancouver, UN Human Settlements advisor and pub owner
- Bilal Khan, Bright Future Vancouver, housing and homelessness advocate
- Kathleen Larsen, TEAM for a Livable Vancouver, Vancouver Heritage Foundation director and TEAM candidate in the 2022 Vancouver Park Board election
- Chloe Leslie, COPE, food redistribution nonprofits
- Andy Lin, Bright Future Vancouver, business founder and community advocate
- Lucy Maloney, OneCity, Vancouver city councillor (2025–present), lawyer and safe streets advocate; elected in the 2025 Vancouver City Council by-election
- Yadwinder Mangat, Bright Future Vancouver, realtor and former Vancouver cab driver
- Sean Orr, COPE, Vancouver city councillor (2025–present), housing activist and journalist; elected in the 2025 Vancouver City Council by-election
- Annette Reilly, Green Party, Green Party candidate in the 2025 Vancouver City Council by-election
- Patrick Sauriol, TEAM for a Livable Vancouver, digital entrepreneur, former DigiBC executive director
- Devyani Singh, COPE, climate scientist and researcher
- Bhavna Solecki, Vote Vancouver, scientific researcher and seniors' advocate
- Stephanie Smith, Green Party, housing, labour, and social justice activist
- Moira Stilwell, Vancouver Liberals, former provincial Cabinet minister
- Caitlin Stockwell, OneCity, Indigenous rights lawyer
- Geoff Teoli, Vote Vancouver, entrepreneur and former Vancouver film commissioner
- Armor Valor, Vancouver Liberals, entrepreneur, Hospital Employees Union member, Langara College board member and former OneCity council candidate
- Jessica Walton, Vancouver Liberals, political strategist and government copywriter
- Jonathan Weisman, TEAM for a Livable Vancouver, lawyer
- Michael Wu, Vancouver Liberals, entrepreneur, RCMP auxiliary constable, and 2024 BC Conservative candidate in Burnaby North
- Solomon Yi-Kieran, COPE, public transit activist, former AMS VP External

==== Declined ====
- Brian Montague, ABC Vancouver, Vancouver city councillor (2022–present)

=== Results ===
2026 Vancouver municipal election: Vancouver City Council
Party	Candidate	Votes	%	Elected
COPE	Sean Orr (X)	83,038	5.02	✓
Green	Annette Reilly	78,476	4.75	✓
COPE	Chloe Leslie	67,791	4.10	✓
COPE	Devyani Singh	65,473	3.96	✓
Green	Stephanie Smith	64,070	3.88	✓
OneCity	Lucy Maloney (X)	63,143	3.82	✓
Green	Camil Dumont	62,540	3.78	✓
COPE	Solomon Yi-Kieran	60,361	3.65	✓
ABC Vancouver	Mike Klassen (X)	57,798	3.50	✓
Green	Bridget Burns	57,788	3.50	✓
ABC Vancouver	Joyce Gillespie	54,981	3.33	
ABC Vancouver	Peter Meiszner (X)	54,507	3.30	
ABC Vancouver	Sarah Kirby-Yung (X)	54,453	3.29	
ABC Vancouver	Lisa Dominato (X)	54,446	3.29	
OneCity	Iona Bonamis	54,366	3.29	
OneCity	Frances Bula	51,498	3.12	
ABC Vancouver	Lenny Zhou (X)	49,874	3.02	
OneCity	Jarrett Hagglund	48,798	2.95	
OneCity	Caitlin Stockwell	48,715	2.95	
ABC Vancouver	Lorraine Lowe	48,095	2.91	
ABC Vancouver	David Grewal	48,086	2.91	
ABC Vancouver	Arezo Zarrabian	44,008	2.66	
Liberal	Victoria Jung	23,791	1.44	
TEAM	Kathleen Larsen	23,141	1.40	
TEAM	Amanda Boggan	22,303	1.35	
TEAM	Charles Kelly	21,895	1.32	
TEAM	Josh Gordon	21,294	1.29	
Liberal	Moira Stilwell	20,844	1.26	
TEAM	Jonathan Weisman	19,746	1.19	
Liberal	Jessica Walton	18,970	1.15	
Liberal	John Coupar	17,362	1.05	
Vote Vancouver	Rebecca Hasdell	17,043	1.03	
TEAM	Raj Mundra	16,177	0.98	
Liberal	Michael Wu	15,748	0.95	
TEAM	Patrick Sauriol	15,356	0.93	
Liberal	Devin Clemens	14,373	0.87	
Liberal	Armor Valor	14,270	0.86	
Vote Vancouver	Geoff Teoli	11,086	0.67	
Vote Vancouver	John Boychuk	9,945	0.60	
Affordable Housing	Eric Redmond	9,543	0.58	
Vote Vancouver	Keerit Jutla	8,974	0.54	
Vote Vancouver	Steve Jedreicich	8,438	0.51	
Vote Vancouver	Bhavna Solecki	7,201	0.44	
Bright Future	Andy Lin	6,122	0.37	
Independent	John Jones	5,088	0.31	
Independent	Rollergirl	4,910	0.30	
Independent	Job Zhao	3,731	0.23	
Bright Future	Yadwinder Mangat	3,613	0.22	
Bright Future	Judith Kasiama	3,568	0.22	
TrueBlue	Naomi Chocyk	3,566	0.22	
Bright Future	Bilal Khan	2,989	0.18	
Independent	Guy Dubé	2,231	0.13	
Independent	Parris J. Williams	2,229	0.13	
Bright Future	Mohadeseh Gharib P. Arasi	2,185	0.13	
Bright Future	Ibrahima Cisse	2,122	0.13	
Independent	Noi Soudarack	838	0.05	

== School board elections ==
=== Candidates ===
==== Declared ====
- Darren Boidman, Vancouver Liberals
- Sherry Breshears, OneCity, inclusive education expert
- Rory Brown, OneCity, teacher and union leader
- Joshua Cameron, Vancouver Liberals
- Steve Cardwell, OneCity, former Vancouver School Board superintendent
- Melanie Cheng, COPE, former DPAC chair and community organizer
- Ishi Dinim, Vancouver Liberals
- Gwen Giesbrecht, COPE, former Vancouver Park Board commissioner (2018–2022) and former DPAC chair
- Amarys Joseph, Vote Vancouver, post-secondary education manager
- Christopher Lee, OneCity, founder of Helping Hearts Youth Foundation
- Suzie Mah, COPE, Vancouver School Board trustee (2022–present)
- Alisha Masongsong, Green Party, community advocate and social planner
- Noosha Mehdian, Vancouver Liberals
- Isabel Ochoa, Vancouver Liberals
- Derrick O'Keefe, COPE, journalist and writer
- Mandy Potter, Vote Vancouver
- Krista Sigurdson, OneCity, health researcher
- Julie Strilesky, Green Party

==== Declined ====
- Jennifer Reddy, OneCity, Vancouver School Board trustee (2022–present)

== Park board elections ==
=== Candidates ===
==== Declared ====
- Summit Ambeault-Wannamaker, Vote Vancouver, wildland firefighter
- Amanda Bains, Vancouver Liberals, community leader
- Amir Bajehkian, Vancouver Liberals, flight data analyst and civic engagement advocate
- Amee Barber, Vote Vancouver, regulated industries policy advocate
- Tricia Barker, Vancouver Liberals, personal trainer and former Vancouver Park Board commissioner (2018–2022)
- Shayla Bird, Vancouver Liberals, educator and public historian
- Sacia Burton, COPE, co-director of BC Poverty Reduction Coalition
- Dominic Denofrio, OneCity, constituency advisor with the BC NDP
- Tom Digby, Green Party, current chair of the Vancouver Park Board and commissioner (2022–present)
- Mark Halyk, Vancouver Liberals
- Jamie Han, COPE, youth organizer
- John Irwin, OneCity, former Vancouver Parks Board commissioner (2018–2022)
- Scott Jensen, Vancouver Liberals, Vancouver Park Board commissioner (2022–present)
- Stephen Menon, Vote Vancouver, product development leader and Qmunity board member
- Tyler Petersen, OneCity, biologist and labour activist
- Breanne Smart, Green Party, chef
- Tamiko Suzuki, COPE, healthcare worker and environmental activist
- Spencer Van Vloten, Green Party, writer and accessibility expert
- Tʼuyʼtʼtanat-Cease Wyss, COPE, ethnobotanist

== Referendum ==
Voters also answered to three referendum questions:

=== Question 1 ===
1. Are you in favour of Council having the authority, without further assent of the electors, to pass by-laws between January 1, 2027, and December 31, 2030, to borrow an aggregate $292,000,000 for the following purposes? A. Bridge and structure infrastructure To provide for major maintenance, rehabilitation, reconstruction, and enhancement of the City’s bridge and structure infrastructure, including repairs and structural work on the Granville Bridge and Cambie Bridge. $154,000,000 B. Pavement and sidewalk infrastructure To provide for major maintenance, reconstruction, and enhancement of the arterial and neighbourhood transportation networks, and sidewalks. $92,000,000 C. Traffic signals and street lighting To provide for major maintenance, replacement, and enhancement of traffic signals and street lighting that are beyond economical repair or no longer meet operational requirements. $46,000,000 Total: $292,000,000

Results
Response	Votes	%
Yes	141,171	77.3
No	41,572	22.7
TOTAL	182,743	100.0

=== Question 2 ===
2. Are you in favour of Council having the authority, without further assent of the electors, to pass by-laws between January 1, 2027, and December 31, 2030, to borrow an aggregate $438,000,000 for the following purposes?

A. Renewal and upgrades of community facilities

To provide for replacement, renewal, or rehabilitation of community facilities, including aging community centres, pools, or other community facility projects, including buildings such as rinks, libraries, childcare facilities and social facilities.

$338,000,000

B. Renewal and upgrades of other community serving and civic facilities

To provide for replacement, renewal, or rehabilitation of other civic essential facilities, including fire halls, service yards, and other cultural facilities, including Vancouver Civic Theatres.

$100,000,000

Total: $438,000,000

Important note If this question receives the assent of the electors, Council has the power, without further assent of the electors, to pass by-laws, as and when Council considers appropriate, to borrow money for the projects described up to $438,000,000.

Explanatory note:

• Community facilities include buildings such as community centres, pools, rinks, libraries, childcare facilities, cultural facilities, and social facilities.

• Civic facilities include buildings such as fire halls, police buildings, administrative facilities, and service yards.

Results

Response	Votes	%
Yes	149,938	79.4
No	38,802	20.6
TOTAL	188,740	100.0

=== Question 3 ===
3. Are you in favour of Council having the authority, without further assent of the electors, to pass by-laws between January 1, 2027, and December 31, 2030, to borrow an aggregate $60,000,000 for the following purposes?

A. Renewal, maintenance, and upgrades of parks

To provide for renewal, ongoing capital maintenance, renovations, or other upgrades of parks, park buildings, and features within parks such as the seawall, pathways, playgrounds, playfields, and sport courts.

$60,000,000

Total: $60,000,000

Important note: If this question receives the assent of the electors, Council has the power, without further assent of the electors, to pass by-laws, as and when Council considers appropriate, to borrow money for the projects described up to $60,000,000.

Results

Response	Votes	%
Yes	152,587	80.7
No	36,489	19.3
TOTAL	189,076	100.0

== Gallery ==
Unmarked ballots for the 2026 Vancouver municipal election
