= Jenny Kwan =

Canadian politician (born 1967)

Jenny Kwan MP
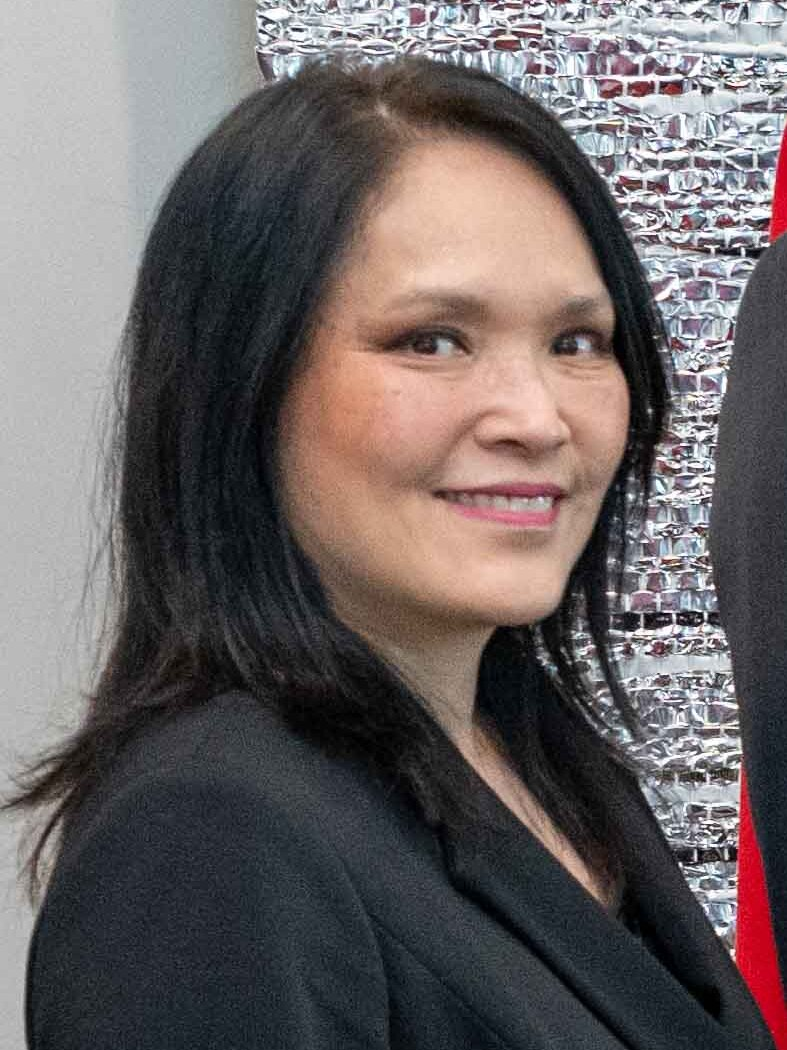
- Kwan in 2024

Member of Parliament for Vancouver East
- Incumbent
- Assumed office October 19, 2015
- Preceded by: Libby Davies

Member of the British Columbia Legislative Assembly for Vancouver-Mount Pleasant
- In office May 28, 1996 – August 4, 2015
- Preceded by: Mike Harcourt
- Succeeded by: Melanie Mark

Minister of Community Development, Cooperatives and Volunteers of British Columbia
- In office February 29, 2000 – June 5, 2001
- Premier: Ujjal Dosanjh
- Preceded by: Jan Pullinger
- Succeeded by: George Abbott

Minister of Women's Equality of British Columbia
- In office July 21, 1999 – February 24, 2000
- Premier: Glen Clark; Dan Miller
- Preceded by: Sue Hammell
- Succeeded by: Evelyn Gillespie

Minister of Municipal Affairs of British Columbia
- In office February 18, 1998 – July 21, 1999
- Premier: Glen Clark
- Preceded by: Michael Farnworth
- Succeeded by: Jim Doyle

Personal details
- Born: Jenny Wai Ching Kwan; 1967 (age 58–59) British Hong Kong
- Party: New Democratic
- Spouse: Dan Small (m. 2001, divorced)
- Education: Simon Fraser University (BA)
- Website: www.jennykwanndp.ca

Chinese name
- Traditional Chinese: 關慧貞
- Simplified Chinese: 关慧贞
Transcriptions
Standard Mandarin
- Hanyu Pinyin: Guān Huìzhēn
Yue: Cantonese
- Jyutping: Gwaan^{1} Wai^{6}-zing^{1}

Jenny Wai Ching Kwan MP (Chinese: 關慧貞; born 1967) is a Canadian politician who is the member of Parliament (MP) for Vancouver East. A member of the New Democratic Party (NDP), Kwan was first elected to the House of Commons in 2015.

She was previously a member of the Legislative Assembly of British Columbia (MLA), representing Vancouver-Mount Pleasant from 1996 to 2015 with the British Columbia (BC) NDP, and together with Liberal MLA Ida Chong became the first Chinese-Canadian members of the BC legislature. Kwan was also the province's first Chinese-Canadian cabinet minister, serving from 1998 to 2001. Kwan entered politics in 1993, when she was elected to the Vancouver City Council.

== Background ==
Kwan immigrated to Canada at age nine with her family from British Hong Kong. She speaks English, French, and Cantonese. She graduated from Simon Fraser University in 1990 with a Bachelor of Arts in criminology, then started her career as a community legal advocate in Vancouver's Downtown Eastside before entering politics.

She married Dan Small in 2001; they have two children together. After separating from Small, Kwan moved to Vancouver's Kitsilano neighbourhood with her children in 2013.

== Political career ==
=== Municipal politics (1993–1996) ===
In 1993, Kwan at age 26 was elected as the youngest-ever member of Vancouver City Council. She was the sole representative of the Coalition of Progressive Electors throughout her term on council.

=== Provincial politics (1996–2015) ===
In the 1996 British Columbia general election, Kwan entered provincial politics. After being nominated, she was elected as the MLA for Vancouver-Mount Pleasant, in East Vancouver. She succeeded Premier Mike Harcourt, who at the time had just resigned over a series of serious fundraising scandals, including Bingogate. She served as the government caucus deputy whip, parliamentary secretary to the Minister of Health, and member of the Select Standing Committee for Public Accounts in the 36th Parliament. She was named Minister of Municipal Affairs by Premier Glen Clark in February 1998, and was re-assigned as Minister of Women's Equality in July 1999. After Ujjal Dosanjh took over as premier in February 2000, Kwan was named Minister of Community Development, Cooperatives and Volunteers.

In 2001, Kwan, along with Joy MacPhail, was one of only two NDP MLAs to survive the party's electoral collapse in the 2001 British Columbia general election due to a BC Liberal landslide upset. She served as a member of the Select Standing Committee on Education and chair of the Select Standing Committee on Public Accounts in the 37th Parliament. She was re-elected in 2005, 2009, and 2013, continuing to serve as an opposition MLA.

==== Leadership controversy, December 2010 ====
In December 2010, Kwan released a statement to the media criticizing NDP leader Carole James, and calling for an immediate leadership convention, after party candidates suffered defeat in the 2009 election. In response to Kwan's statement, James called an emergency caucus session to address opposition to her continued leadership. Before the caucus meeting was held, however, James announced her resignation as party leader. While Kwan was accused of self-interest, at the time she claimed to have no plans to run for the leadership of the party.

==== Portland Hotel Society controversy, March 2014 ====
In March 2014, an audit of the Portland Hotel Society showed that Kwan's ex-husband, Dan Small, had improperly expensed the cost of a family Disneyland trip to the society. At the time of the trip, Kwan had still been married to Small and had participated in the trip with their children. When the audit became public, Kwan held a press conference where she denied any knowledge that the society had paid for the trip, and said she would reimburse the society. Following the conference, Kwan took a brief leave of absence.

=== Member of Parliament (2015–present) ===
In January 2015, Kwan announced her plan to seek the NDP nomination in Vancouver East for the forthcoming federal election, after NDP MP Libby Davies, who had served since 1997, chose not to seek another term. Mable Elmore, her legislative colleague from Vancouver-Kensington, was also seeking the party's nomination in the riding. Supporters of Kwan's candidacy included Union of British Columbia Indian Chiefs president Stewart Philip, Chinese Freemasons Association president Herbert Yiu, former British Columbia natural resources minister Robert Arthur Williams, and United Steelworkers official Steve Hunt. She was nominated on March 22. Vancouver East had elected an MP from the NDP or its predecessor, the Co-operative Commonwealth Federation, in all but two elections since it was first contested in 1935; it voted for Liberal candidates in 1974 and 1993.

She was elected to the House of Commons in October 2015, defeating candidates Edward Wong (Liberal) and James Low (Conservative) by wide margins. On November 12, NDP leader Tom Mulcair appointed her to be the party's critic for immigration, refugees and citizenship. Kwan supported Jagmeet Singh in his successful campaign in the 2017 NDP leadership election.

She was re-elected in the 2019, 2021 and 2025 federal elections.

On May 12, 2023, it was reported that the Canadian Security Intelligence Service approached Kwan about a meeting concerning Chinese diplomats threatening her.

As the NDP's critic for immigration and public safety, Kwan has advocated for asylum seekers and opposed legislation seeking to increase border enforcement.

== Electoral record ==
=== Federal ===
2025 Canadian federal election: Vancouver East
Party	Candidate	Votes	%	±%	Expenditures
New Democratic	Jenny Kwan	24,945	43.65	–12.75	$105,327.15
Liberal	Mark Wiens	20,287	35.50	+15.74	$81,558.63
Conservative	Lita Cabal	10,162	17.78	+6.89	$49,685.80
Green	Nikida Steel	1,099	1.92	–5.80	$5,921.43
People's	Meghan Emily Murphy	329	0.58	–2.21	$1,941.84
Communist	Kimball Cariou	329	0.58	–0.20	none listed
Total valid votes/expense limit		57,151	99.40	–	$136,600.15
Total rejected ballots		347	0.60	–0.45	
Turnout		57,498	62.70	+7.85	
Eligible voters		91,705			
New Democratic hold		Swing		–14.25	
Source: Elections Canada

2021 Canadian federal election: Vancouver East
Party	Candidate	Votes	%	±%	Expenditures
New Democratic	Jenny Kwan	27,969	56.40	+3.83	$67,138.66
Liberal	Josh Vander Vies	9,797	19.76	+1.62	$42,946.92
Conservative	Mauro Francis	5,399	10.89	–1.20	$9,491.11
Green	Cheryl Matthew	3,826	7.72	–6.78	$5,835.22
People's	Karin Litzcke	1,382	2.79	+1.57	$3,823.14
Libertarian	Gölök Buday	831	1.68	+0.67	none listed
Communist	Natasha Hale	387	0.78	+0.46	none listed
Total valid votes/expense limit		49,591	98.95	–	$119,373.85
Total rejected ballots		528	1.05	+0.10	
Turnout		50,119	54.85	–5.43	
Eligible voters		91,371			
New Democratic hold		Swing		+1.10	
Source: Elections Canada

2019 Canadian federal election: Vancouver East
Party	Candidate	Votes	%	±%	Expenditures
New Democratic	Jenny Kwan	29,236	52.57	+2.64	$84,286.14
Liberal	Kyle Demes	10,085	18.13	–10.02	$25,852.88
Green	Bridget Burns	8,062	14.50	+5.31	$51,975.81
Conservative	Chris Corsetti	6,724	12.09	+1.32	$4,528.19
People's	Karin Litzcke	679	1.22	–	$5,873.34
Libertarian	Gölök Buday	562	1.01	–	$182.20
Communist	Peter Marcus	177	0.32	–0.58	$476.56
Marxist–Leninist	Anne Jamieson	86	0.15	–0.21	none listed
Total valid votes/expense limit		55,611	99.04	–	$116,776.71
Total rejected ballots		537	0.96	+0.27	
Turnout		56,148	60.28	–5.90	
Eligible voters		93,146			
New Democratic hold		Swing		+6.33	
Source: Elections Canada

2015 Canadian federal election: Vancouver East
Party	Candidate	Votes	%	±%	Expenditures
New Democratic	Jenny Kwan	29,316	49.94	–12.89	$107,948.45
Liberal	Edward Wong	16,532	28.16	+18.25	$103,236.57
Conservative	James Low	6,322	10.77	–8.13	$10,430.75
Green	Wes Regan	5,395	9.19	+1.54	$29,914.97
Communist	Peter Marcus	525	0.89	–	none listed
Independent	D. Alex Millar	216	0.37	–	$487.05
Marxist–Leninist	Anne Jamieson	214	0.36	–0.35	none listed
Pirate	Shawn Vulliez	188	0.32	–	none listed
Total valid votes/expense limit		58,708	99.31	–	$226,454.95
Total rejected ballots		405	0.69	+0.07	
Turnout		59,113	66.18	+11.76	
Eligible voters		89,324			
New Democratic hold		Swing		−15.57	
Source: Elections Canada

=== Provincial ===
2013 British Columbia general election: Vancouver-Mount Pleasant
Party	Candidate	Votes	%	±%	Expenditures
New Democratic	Jenny Wai Ching Kwan	13,845	65.83	+1.88	$78,020
Liberal	Celyna Sia Sherst	3,942	18.74	−2.06	$18,622
Green	Barinder Hans	2,506	11.92	−2.36	$7,727
Marijuana	William Austin	349	1.66	–	$250
Independent	Jeremy Gustafson	260	1.24	–	$480
Communist	Peter Marcus	129	0.61	−0.36	$344
Total valid votes		21,031	99.03	–	
Total rejected ballots		207	0.97	−0.25	
Turnout		21,238	49.77	+3.30	
Registered voters		42,672			
New Democratic hold		Swing		+1.97	
Source: Elections BC

2009 British Columbia general election: Vancouver-Mount Pleasant
Party	Candidate	Votes	%	±%	Expenditures
New Democratic	Jenny Kwan	11,232	63.95	−0.29	$79,796
Liberal	Sherry Darlene Wiebe	3,654	20.80	−0.48	$41,506
Green	John T. Boychuck	2,507	14.28	+4.05	$7,013
Communist	Peter Marcus	171	0.97	+0.48	$1,565
Total valid votes		17,564	100		
Total rejected ballots		218	1.23		
Turnout		17,782	46.47		
New Democratic hold		Swing		+0.10	

2005 British Columbia general election: Vancouver-Mount Pleasant
Party	Candidate	Votes	%	±%	Expenditures
New Democratic	Jenny Kwan	12,974	64.24	+19.76	$98,030
Liberal	Juliet Andalis	4,298	21.28	-11.90	$34,819
Green	Raven Bowen	2,066	10.23	-5.99	$1,882
Marijuana	Christopher Patrick Bennett	308	1.53	-1.50	$100
Independent	Mike Hansen	205	1.02	–	$406
Work Less	Niki Westman	187	0.93	–	$100
Communist	Peter Marcus	98	0.49	-0.39	$2,928
Democratic Reform	Imtiaz Popat	43	0.21	–	$100
Platinum	Kirk Anton Moses	17	0.08	–	$130
Total valid votes		20,196	100		
Total rejected ballots		312	1.54		
Turnout		20,508	49.93		
New Democratic hold		Swing		+15.83	

2001 British Columbia general election: Vancouver-Mount Pleasant
Party	Candidate	Votes	%	±%	Expenditures
New Democratic	Jenny Kwan	7,163	44.48	-19.57	$60,582
Liberal	Gail Sparrow	5,343	33.18	+8.82	$56,796
Green	Dale Hofmann	2,612	16.22	+11.86	$3,276
Marijuana	David Malmo-Levine	489	3.03	–	$721
Unity	Ken Wright	166	1.03	–	$185
No Affiliation	Liar Liar	148	0.92	–	–
Communist	Kimball Cariou	142	0.88	+0.19	$332
Party of Citizens	Franklin Wayne Poley	42	0.26	–	331
Total valid votes		16,105	100.00		
Total rejected ballots		208	1.29		
Turnout		16,313	59.36		
New Democratic hold		Swing		-14.2	

1996 British Columbia general election: Vancouver-Mount Pleasant
Party	Candidate	Votes	%	±%	Expenditures
New Democratic	Jenny Kwan	11,155	64.05	+0.72	$41,905
Liberal	Anne Beer	4,243	24.36	+4.71	$32,735
Green	Paul Alexander	759	4.36	+1.65	$100
Progressive Democrat	John Spark	584	3.35		$100
Reform	Wayne Marsden	354	2.03	+1.53	
Communist	Kimball Cariou	121	0.69		$319
Natural Law	John S.W. Kent	114	0.65		$120
Social Credit	Agnes Kokko	86	0.49	-12.93	$526
Total valid votes		17,416	98.40		
Total rejected ballots		284	1.60	-2.02	
Turnout		17,700	60.50	-3.52	
Registered voters		29,255			
New Democratic hold		Swing		-1.99	

== See also ==
- Chinese Canadians in Greater Vancouver
