= Joan Phillip =

Canadian politician (1952–2026)

- Amshen
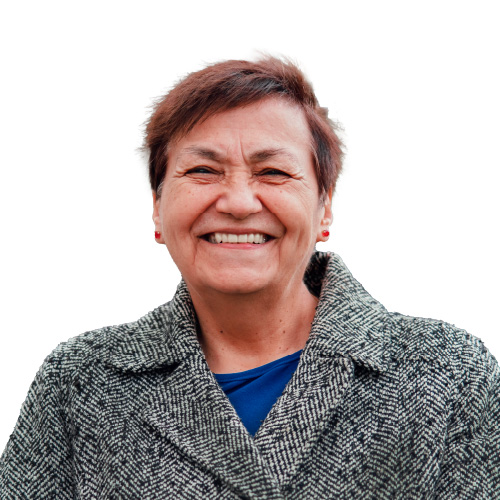
- Campaign portrait, 2023 (Note: Used as the campaign portrait in 2024)

Parliamentary Secretary for Community Development and Non-profits of British Columbia
- In office November 18, 2024 – August 28, 2026
- Premier: David Eby
- Preceded by: Megan Dykeman

Member of the British Columbia Legislative Assembly for Vancouver-Strathcona Vancouver-Mount Pleasant (2023–2024)
- In office June 24, 2023 – August 28, 2026
- Preceded by: Melanie Mark
- Succeeded by: Amanda Burrows

Personal details
- Born: Joan Carter; June 12, 1952 North Vancouver, British Columbia, Canada
- Died: August 28, 2026 (aged 74)
- Party: New Democratic
- Spouse: Stewart Phillip
- Relations: Chief Dan George (grandfather); Lee Maracle (sister)

Joan Phillip (née Carter, formerly Stewart; June 12, 1952 – August 28, 2026) was a Canadian politician, Indigenous leader, and climate activist who served as a member of the Legislative Assembly of British Columbia (MLA) representing the electoral district of Vancouver-Strathcona from 2023 until her death in 2026. She was a member of the British Columbia New Democratic Party.

Phillip grew up in North Vancouver and Vancouver's Downtown Eastside. She worked as a land manager for the Penticton Indian Band, and ran for the federal New Democrats during the 2019 and 2021 federal elections in the riding of Central Okanagan—Similkameen—Nicola.

Following the resignation of Vancouver-Mount Pleasant MLA Melanie Mark in 2023, Phillip was acclaimed as the BC NDP's candidate and went on to win the June 24, 2023 by-election. She was re-elected in Vancouver-Strathcona during the 2024 general election.

== Early life and activism ==
Phillip was born Joan Carter on June 12, 1952, and raised in the city of North Vancouver, British Columbia, spending her childhood there and in Vancouver's Downtown Eastside. Her Indigenous name was Amshen. She was the daughter of Bob George, a Tsleil-Waututh elder; his father was Dan George, an actor, writer, and Tsleil-Waututh chief. She was born alongside her twin sister, Joyce. Among her siblings is author Lee Maracle.

Involved in political activism from the age of sixteen, Phillip, then Carter, was a member of the Native Alliance for Red Power (NARP), an Indigenous militant organization established in the 1960s. Glen Coulthard described Phillip, then Carter, in the Routledge Handbook of Critical Indigenous Studies as one of the core NARP members alongside Ray Bobb, Willie Dunn, David Hanuse, and Henry Jack. As an activist, she allied herself with the Palestine Liberation Organization and Black Panthers. In 1975, Carter led a delegation of 18 Western Canadian Indigenous representatives, called the Native Peoples Friendship Delegation, to the People's Republic of China.

She had an extensive career as an environmental activist, having previously worked to oppose the Trans Mountain pipeline, Ajax mine, Site C dam, and the salmon farm industry. In solidarity with the ongoing Oka Crisis in 1990, Phillip and her husband Stewart organized a rail blockade of Seton Portage, being arrested by the RCMP in the process. Phillip alongside her husband were closely associated with one another in activist circles, having protested together since the 1970s. Climate organization 350 degrees Canada dubbed Phillip one of seven candidates to watch during her previous runs for federal office.

Phillip studied Indigenous peoples' resource management at the University of Saskatchewan and at the National Aboriginal Land Managers Association.

== Career ==
Before elected to political office, Phillip worked for a various First Nations organizations including as a youth counsellor at the Outreach Alternate School through Britannia Secondary School, program director at the Aboriginal Friendship Centre (then the Vancouver Indian Centre), as part of the native police liaison committee in Vancouver, at the First United Church's outreach alternative school, and as the lands manager for the Penticton Indian Band. Phillip was elected as a member of the Penticton Band Council. Phillip retired as land manager for the Penticton Indian Band in September 2019, having served in the position for 20 years.

=== Political career ===
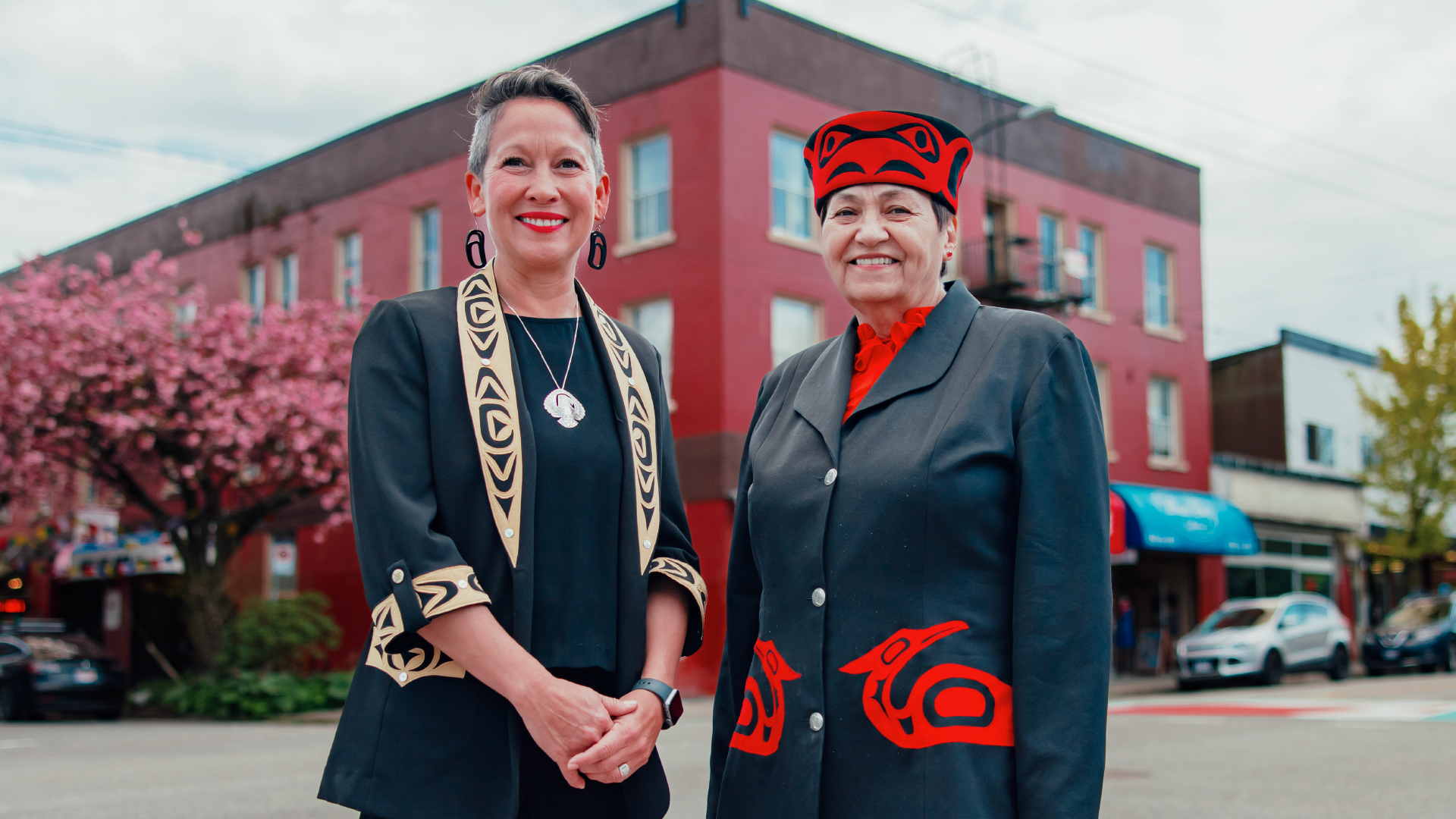
Phillip alongside outgoing Vancouver-Mount Pleasant MLA Melanie Mark

Phillip ran twice for the federal New Democratic Party during the 2019 and 2021 Canadian federal elections before her subsequent win during the 2023 Vancouver-Mount Pleasant provincial by-election. Phillip was a supporter of the New Democrats since "about 1972", during the premiership of Dave Barrett. According to Phillip, she ran for the party twice previously prior to her 2019 run, once provincially and once federally.

She entered federal politics as the New Democratic Party's candidate for the Central Okanagan—Similkameen—Nicola riding during the 2019 election. The seat was held by Dan Albas of the Conservative Party. Phillip was acclaimed as the New Democrats' nominee for the seat on May 4, 2019. She lost to the incumbent, ultimately placing in third.

Phillip ran for the seat of Central Okanagan—Similkameen—Nicola for a second time during the 2021 federal election for a rematch against Albas. She ultimately lost, but moved the New Democrats into second place in the riding. Phillip conceded that her campaign was a long shot, citing the conservative lean of the riding.

Following two unsuccessful runs for federal office in Central Okanagan—Similkameen—Nicola, Phillip was parachuted in to the riding of Vancouver-Mount Pleasant as the nominee for the provincial British Columbia New Democratic Party. The seat was vacated upon the resignation of former cabinet minister Melanie Mark. Despite her connections with the Penticton Indian Band, Phillip touted her long-term, ancestral connections to Vancouver's Downtown Eastside including previous employment, experiences in the riding, and family relations. She ran against four candidates, Jackie Lee of B.C. United, Wendy Hayko of the B.C. Greens, Karin Litzcke of the B.C. Conservatives, and Kimball Cariou of the B.C. Communist Party. Phillip ultimately won with 68 percent of the vote, becoming the next MLA for Vancouver-Mount Pleasant.

Her victory was celebrated by the First Nations Leadership Council, a council composed of representatives from the BC Assembly of First Nations, First Nations Summit, and Union of BC Indian Chiefs. Upon her victory, she became the second ever First Nations woman to serve in British Columbia's Legislative Assembly, after Melanie Mark, her predecessor. Her predecessor, Melanie Mark, stated that a "toxic culture" at the Legislative Assembly contributed to her resignation. In response, Phillip asserted that she would choose to "give any MLAs who are rude to her a good whack with her SIA stick", a stick from a Saskatoon berry tree.

Phillip endorsed Alberta MP Heather McPherson in the 2026 New Democratic Party leadership election.

== Political positions ==
Phillip was a supporter of Premier of British Columbia David Eby's proposed rental protection fund, which provided greater abilities for non-profit housing providers to purchase rental buildings slated for redevelopment.

Citing her stepson's death as a result of a Carfentanil overdose, Phillip supported access to safe supply and easy to access support services. According to the Vancouver Sun, Phillip was dismayed at BC United's assertions that prescribed opioids contributed to human deaths. Phillip also supported the federal New Democrats' proposal for a universal pharmacare program, and opposed the Eby government's decision to pause DRIPA, with the NDP ultimately backing down.

== Personal life ==
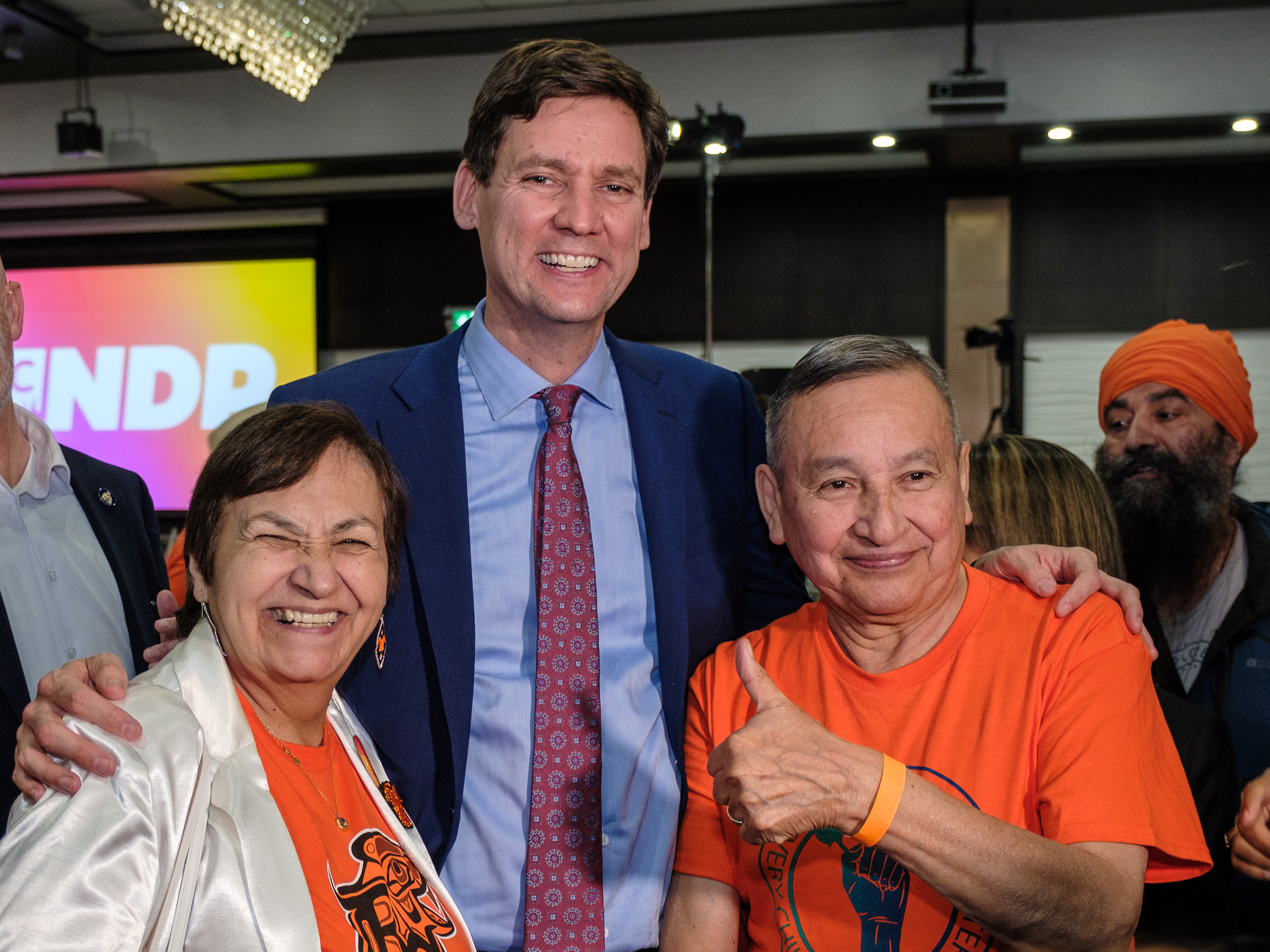
Phillip alongside her husband, Stewart Phillip, and Premier of British Columbia David Eby

Phillip was married to Chief Stewart Phillip, the president of the Union of British Columbia Indian Chiefs (UBCIC), until her death. Both were previously married and had children from their previous relationships. The two of them have five surviving children, fifteen grandchildren, and one great-grandchild. Phillip raised three of her children in Vancouver's Downtown Eastside. In 2018, Phillip's stepson, Kenny Phillip, died of a carfentanil overdose, leaving behind six children.

Stewart Phillip first encountered Joan Carter after reading Lee Maracle's Bobbi Lee: Indian Rebel and seeing her headshot featured in the book. The two met during their time at the Vancouver Indian Centre Society as members of the board. The relationship between the two was strained as a result of Stewart's struggles with alcoholism. Phillip stated that she was clean and sober for 34 years as of May 2023.

Phillip owned an apartment in Vancouver's Downtown Eastside along with a home in Penticton.

=== Health and death ===
In December 2025, the BC NDP caucus announced that Phillip had been diagnosed with an illness that needed treatment, with her taking a leave of absence as an MLA. In April 2026, Premier David Eby described Phillip as "very ill" and wished her a "quick recovery".

Phillip died on August 28, 2026, at the age of 74 from an undisclosed illness. The UBCIC asked for donations to be directed to the BC Cancer Society.

== Electoral history ==
=== Provincial elections ===
2024 British Columbia general election: Vancouver-Strathcona
Party	Candidate	Votes	%	±%	Expenditures
New Democratic	Joan Phillip	13,673	68.17	+0.38	$25,594.73
Conservative	Scott Muller	3,430	17.10	+12.19	$224.00
Green	Simon de Weerdt	2,618	13.05	+1.49	$4,690.73
Communist	Kimball Cariou	336	1.68	–0.39	$1,088.46
Total valid votes		20,057	99.68	–	
Total rejected ballots		64	0.32	+0.06	
Turnout		20,121	51.36		
Registered voters		39,177			
New Democratic hold		Swing		−5.91	
Source: Elections BC

British Columbia provincial by-election, June 24, 2023: Vancouver-Mount Pleasant Resignation of Melanie Mark
Party	Candidate	Votes	%	±%	Expenditures
New Democratic	Joan Phillip	5,459	67.79	+0.84	$52,059.61
BC United	Jackie Lee	1,101	13.67	+0.69	$57,476.94
Green	Wendy Hayko	931	11.56	–8.51	$7,328.43
Conservative	Karin Litzcke	395	4.91	New	$9,705.81
Communist	Kimball Cariou	167	2.07	New	$0.00
Total valid votes/expenses limit		8,053	99.74	—	$69,086.25
Total rejected ballots		21	0.26	–0.71	
Turnout		8,074	17.73	–30.28	
Registered voters		45,533			
New Democratic hold		Swing		+0.08	
Source: Elections BC

=== Federal elections ===
2021 Canadian federal election: Central Okanagan—Similkameen—Nicola
Party	Candidate	Votes	%	±%	Expenditures
Conservative	Dan Albas	30,563	47.60	–0.35	$56,271.94
New Democratic	Joan Phillip	13,813	21.51	+4.72	$22,670.21
Liberal	Sarah Eves	13,291	20.70	–4.33	$46,717.01
People's	Kathryn Mcdonald	4,788	7.46	+5.39	$9,005.35
Green	Brennan Wauters	1,755	2.73	–5.10	$93.76
Total valid votes/expense limit		64,210	99.28	–	$134,576.18
Total rejected ballots		466	0.72	+0.20	
Turnout		64,676	64.53	–3.75	
Eligible voters		100,229			
Conservative hold		Swing		–	
Source: Elections Canada

2019 Canadian federal election: Central Okanagan—Similkameen—Nicola
Party	Candidate	Votes	%	±%	Expenditures
Conservative	Dan Albas	31,135	47.95	+8.39	$37,003.45
Liberal	Mary Ann Murphy	16,252	25.03	–12.18	$46,702.69
New Democratic	Joan Phillip	10,904	16.79	–2.51	$29,000.61
Green	Robert Mellalieu	5,086	7.83	+3.90	$800.00
People's	Allan Duncan	1,345	2.07	–	$3,071.16
Libertarian	Jesse Regier	213	0.33	–	none listed
Total valid votes/expense limit		64,935	99.48	–	$126,719.22
Total rejected ballots		341	0.52	+0.22	
Turnout		65,276	68.28	–2.68	
Eligible voters		95,597			
Conservative hold		Swing		+10.28	
Source: Elections Canada
