= Vancouver-Strathcona =

Provincial electoral district in British Columbia, Canada

British Columbia electoral district
- Interactive map of riding boundaries

Provincial electoral district
- Legislature: Legislative Assembly of British Columbia
MLA
Amanda Burrows
New Democratic
- First contested: 1991
- Last contested: 2026

Demographics
- Population (2021): 54,588
- Area (km²): 12
- Pop. density (per km²): 4,549
- Census division: Metro Vancouver
- Census subdivision: Vancouver

Vancouver-Strathcona (formerly Vancouver-Mount Pleasant) is a provincial electoral district in British Columbia that has been represented in the Legislative Assembly of British Columbia since 1991.

Created under the 1991 British Columbia electoral redistribution, the district was first contested in the 1991 general election. Formed from parts of Vancouver Centre and Vancouver East, the district adopted its current name and underwent modest boundary adjustments for the 2024 election, which implemented the results of the 2021 redistribution.

The district is widely considered one of the safest New Democratic seats in the province.

== Demographics ==
Population, 2021	54,588
Area (km^{2})	12
Pop. density (people per km^{2})	4,549
Source: BC Electoral Boundaries Commission

== Geography ==
Located in the east end of Vancouver, the district comprises the eastern part of Downtown and parts of Mount Pleasant, Grandview-Woodland, Kensington-Cedar Cottage, and Chinatown, as well as all of Strathcona, Downtown Eastside, and Gastown.

== Members of the Legislative Assembly ==
Assembly	Years	Member	Party
Vancouver-Mount Pleasant; Riding created from Vancouver Centre and Vancouver East
35th	1991–1996	Mike Harcourt	New Democratic
36th	1996–2001	Jenny Kwan	New Democratic
37th	2001–2005	Jenny Kwan	New Democratic
38th	2005–2009	Jenny Kwan	New Democratic
39th	2009–2013	Jenny Kwan	New Democratic
40th	2013–2015	Jenny Kwan	New Democratic
40th	2016–2017	Melanie Mark	New Democratic
41st	2017–2020	Melanie Mark	New Democratic
42nd	2020–2023	Melanie Mark	New Democratic
42nd	2023–2024	Joan Phillip	New Democratic
Vancouver-Strathcona
43rd	2024–2026	Joan Phillip	New Democratic
44th	2026–present	Amanda Burrows	New Democratic

== Election results ==
2026 British Columbia general election
** Preliminary results — Not yet official **
Party	Candidate	Votes	%	±%
New Democratic	Amanda Burrows	9,484	55.09	-13.08
Green	Tanya Webking	4,985	28.96	+15.90
Conservative	Jordan Zheng McIntosh (Note: Removed by the party after the candidate deadline, but will remain on the ballot.)	2,531	14.70	-2.40
Communist	Robert Crooks	216	1.25	-0.42
Total valid votes		17,216	99.51	
Total rejected ballots		85	0.49	+0.17
Turnout		17,301		
Registered voters				
New Democratic hold		Swing		-14.49
Source: Elections BC

2024 British Columbia general election
Party	Candidate	Votes	%	±%	Expenditures
New Democratic	Joan Phillip	13,673	68.17	+0.38	$25,594.73
Conservative	Scott Muller	3,430	17.10	+12.19	$224.00
Green	Simon de Weerdt	2,618	13.05	+1.49	$4,690.73
Communist	Kimball Cariou	336	1.68	–0.39	$1,088.46
Total valid votes		20,057	99.68	–	
Total rejected ballots		64	0.32	+0.06	
Turnout		20,121	51.36		
Registered voters		39,177			
New Democratic hold		Swing		−5.91	
Source: Elections BC

British Columbia provincial by-election, June 24, 2023: Vancouver-Mount Pleasant Resignation of Melanie Mark
Party	Candidate	Votes	%	±%	Expenditures
New Democratic	Joan Phillip	5,459	67.79	+0.84	$52,059.61
BC United	Jackie Lee	1,101	13.67	+0.69	$57,476.94
Green	Wendy Hayko	931	11.56	–8.51	$7,328.43
Conservative	Karin Litzcke	395	4.91	New	$9,705.81
Communist	Kimball Cariou	167	2.07	New	$0.00
Total valid votes/expenses limit		8,053	99.74	—	$69,086.25
Total rejected ballots		21	0.26	–0.71	
Turnout		8,074	17.73	–30.28	
Registered voters		45,533			
New Democratic hold		Swing		+0.08	
Source: Elections BC

2020 British Columbia general election: Vancouver-Mount Pleasant
Party	Candidate	Votes	%	±%	Expenditures
New Democratic	Melanie Mark	14,530	66.95	+1.63	$22,210.72
Green	Kelly Tatham	4,356	20.07	+3.14	$5,570.94
Liberal	George Vassilas	2,816	12.98	−3.06	$8,413.63
Total valid votes		21,702	99.03	–	
Total rejected ballots		212	0.97	−0.07	
Turnout		21,914	48.01	−9.61	
Registered voters		45,644			
New Democratic hold		Swing		−0.76	
Source: Elections BC

2017 British Columbia general election: Vancouver-Mount Pleasant
Party	Candidate	Votes	%	±%	Expenditures
New Democratic	Melanie Mark	15,962	65.33	+5.18	$40,109
Green	Jerry Kroll	4,136	16.93	−10.15	$68,641
Liberal	Conny Lin	3,917	16.03	+4.74	$32,647
Independent	Mike Hansen	212	0.87	–	$30
Communist	Peter Marcus	135	0.55	–	$0
Your Political Party	Shai Joseph Mor	72	0.29	−0.36	$85
Total valid votes		24,434	98.96	–	
Total rejected ballots		256	1.04	+0.57	
Turnout		24,690	57.62	+34.45	
Registered voters		42,848			
New Democratic hold		Swing		+7.67	
Source: Elections BC

British Columbia provincial by-election, February 2, 2016: Vancouver-Mount Pleasant Resignation of Jenny Kwan
Party	Candidate	Votes	%	±%	Expenditures
New Democratic	Melanie Mark	5,627	60.14	−5.69	$71,603
Green	Pete Fry	2,533	27.07	+15.16	$29,065
Liberal	Gavin Dew	1,056	11.29	−7.46	$66,547
Libertarian	Bonnie Boya Hu	79	0.84	–	$250
Your Political Party	Jeremy Gustafson	61	0.65	–	$454
Total valid votes		9,356	99.53	–	
Total rejected ballots		44	0.47	−0.51	
Turnout		9,400	23.17	−26.60	
Registered voters		40,561			
New Democratic hold		Swing		−10.42	

2013 British Columbia general election: Vancouver-Mount Pleasant
Party	Candidate	Votes	%	±%	Expenditures
New Democratic	Jenny Wai Ching Kwan	13,845	65.83	+1.88	$78,020
Liberal	Celyna Sia Sherst	3,942	18.74	−2.06	$18,622
Green	Barinder Hans	2,506	11.92	−2.36	$7,727
Marijuana	William Austin	349	1.66	–	$250
Independent	Jeremy Gustafson	260	1.24	–	$480
Communist	Peter Marcus	129	0.61	−0.36	$344
Total valid votes		21,031	99.03	–	
Total rejected ballots		207	0.97	−0.25	
Turnout		21,238	49.77	+3.30	
Registered voters		42,672			
New Democratic hold		Swing		+1.97	
Source: Elections BC

2009 British Columbia general election
Party	Candidate	Votes	%	±%	Expenditures
New Democratic	Jenny Kwan	11,232	63.95	-0.29	$79,796
Liberal	Sherry Darlene Wiebe	3,654	20.80	-0.48	$41,506
Green	John T. Boychuck	2,507	14.27	+4.04	$7,013
Communist	Peter Marcus	171	0.97	+0.49	$1,565
Total valid votes		17,564	98.77		
Total rejected ballots		218	1.23	-0.30	
Turnout		17,782	46.47	-3.46	
Registered voters		38,267			
New Democratic hold		Swing		+0.09	

2005 British Columbia general election
Party	Candidate	Votes	%	±%	Expenditures
New Democratic	Jenny Kwan	12,974	64.24	+19.76	$98,030
Liberal	Juliet Andalis	4,298	21.28	-11.89	$34,819
Green	Raven Bowen	2,066	10.23	-5.99	$1,882
Marijuana	Christopher Patrick Bennett	308	1.53	-1.51	$100
Independent	Mike Hansen	205	1.02		$406
Work Less	Niki Westman	187	0.93		$100
Communist	Peter Marcus	98	0.49	-0.40	$2,928
Democratic Reform	Imtiaz Popat	43	0.21		$100
Platinum	Kirk Anton Moses	17	0.08		$130
Total valid votes		20,196	98.48		
Total rejected ballots		312	1.52	+0.25	
Turnout		20,508	49.93	-9.43	
Registered voters		41,071			
New Democratic hold		Swing		+15.83	

2001 British Columbia general election
Party	Candidate	Votes	%	±%	Expenditures
New Democratic	Jenny Kwan	7,163	44.48	-19.57	$60,582
Liberal	Gail Sparrow	5,343	33.18	+8.81	$56,796
Green	Dale Hofmann	2,612	16.22	+11.86	$3,276
Marijuana	David Malmo-Levine	489	3.04		$721
Unity	Ken Wright	166	1.03		$185
No Affiliation	Liar Liar	148	0.92		
Communist	Kimball Cariou	142	0.88	+0.19	$332
Party of Citizens	Franklin Wayne Poley	42	0.26		$331
Total valid votes		16,105	98.72		
Total rejected ballots		208	1.28	-0.33	
Turnout		16,313	59.36	-1.14	
Registered voters		27,480			
New Democratic hold		Swing		-14.19	

1996 British Columbia general election: Vancouver-Mount Pleasant
Party	Candidate	Votes	%	±%	Expenditures
New Democratic	Jenny Kwan	11,155	64.05	+0.72	$41,905
Liberal	Anne Beer	4,243	24.36	+4.71	$32,735
Green	Paul Alexander	759	4.36	+1.65	$100
Progressive Democrat	John Spark	584	3.35		$100
Reform	Wayne Marsden	354	2.03	+1.53	
Communist	Kimball Cariou	121	0.69		$319
Natural Law	John S.W. Kent	114	0.65		$120
Social Credit	Agnes Kokko	86	0.49	-12.93	$526
Total valid votes		17,416	98.40		
Total rejected ballots		284	1.60	-2.02	
Turnout		17,700	60.50	-3.52	
Registered voters		29,255			
New Democratic hold		Swing		-1.99	

1991 British Columbia general election: Vancouver-Mount Pleasant
Party	Candidate	Votes	%	Expenditures
New Democratic	Mike Harcourt	10,108	63.33	$105,044
Liberal	Todd Gnissios	3,137	19.65	$3,341
Social Credit	Randy Vannatter	2,143	13.43	$11,663
Green	Grant Watson	432	2.71	$579
Libertarian	John Wayne Marsden	80	0.50	
Interdependence	Jack Latek	62	0.39	
Total valid votes		15,962	96.38	
Total rejected ballots		600	3.62	
Turnout		16,562	64.03	
Registered voters		25,868		

== Student vote results ==
Student Vote Canada is a non-partisan program that holds mock elections in Canadian elementary and secondary schools alongside general elections, with the same candidates and electoral system.

2024 British Columbia general election
Party	Candidate	Votes	%	±%
Communist	Kimball Cariou	113	9.05	–
Green	Simon de Weerdt	411	32.93	–
Conservative	Scott Muller	197	15.79	–
New Democratic	Joan Phillip	527	42.23	–
Total valid votes		1,248	100.0	–
Source: Student Vote Canada

== See also ==
- List of British Columbia provincial electoral districts
- Canadian provincial electoral districts

Legislative Assembly of British Columbia
Preceded by Surrey-Newton	Constituency represented by the premier 1991–1996	Succeeded by Vancouver-Kingsway
