= 2023 Vancouver-Mount Pleasant provincial by-election =

2023 Vancouver-Mount Pleasant by-election
- June 24, 2023

Riding of Vancouver-Mount Pleasant
- Turnout: 17.73% (▼30.28 pp)
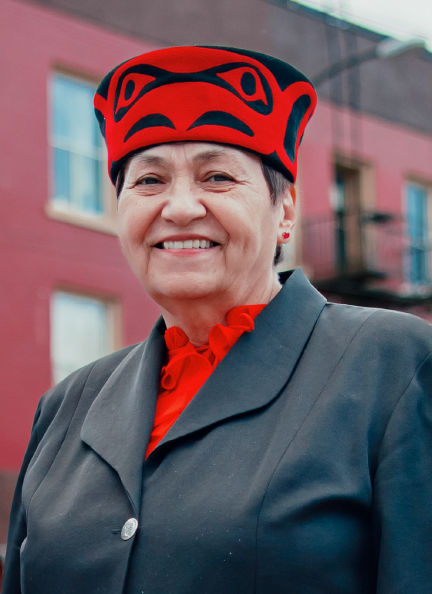
	First party	Second party	Third party
		BCU	GRN
Candidate	Joan Phillip	Jackie Lee	Wendy Hayko
Party	New Democratic	BC United	Green
Last election	66.95%	12.98%	20.07%
Popular vote	5,459	1,101	931
Percentage	67.79%	13.67%	11.56%
Swing	▲0.84 pp	▲0.69 pp	▼8.51 pp
MLA before election
Melanie Mark
New Democratic
Elected MLA
Joan Phillip
New Democratic

A by-election was held on June 24, 2023, to elect a member of the Legislative Assembly (MLA) to represent Vancouver-Mount Pleasant in the Legislative Assembly of British Columbia following the resignation of New Democratic MLA Melanie Mark.

The by-election was held on the same day as one in Langford-Juan de Fuca.

== Background ==
New Democratic MLA Melanie Mark was first elected to the Legislative Assembly in a 2016 by-election and was re-elected in the 2017 and 2020 provincial elections. She was the first First Nations woman to serve in the British Columbia legislature and the first to serve as a cabinet minister.

On February 22, 2023, Mark announced that she would resign as an MLA and cabinet minister and retire from provincial politics, citing the personal toll of her time in office. Her resignation took effect on April 14, 2023.

On May 27, 2023, Premier David Eby called the by-election for June 24, 2023, alongside a by-election in Langford-Juan de Fuca.

== Constituency ==
Located in Vancouver, the district comprises the Mount Pleasant neighbourhood and the eastern parts of Downtown Vancouver, including Chinatown and the Downtown Eastside.

== Candidates ==
- Kimball Cariou (Communist), leader of the Communist Party; previously the Communist candidate in Vancouver-Hastings during the 2020 provincial election
- Wendy Hayko (Green), emergency management expert; previously the Green candidate in Vancouver-Quilchena during the April 2022 provincial by-election
- Jackie Lee (United), businessman
- Karin Litzcke (Conservative), education advocate; previously the People's Party candidate in Vancouver East during the 2021 Canadian federal election and the Libertarian candidate in Vancouver-Kingsway during the 2020 provincial election
- Joan Phillip (New Democratic), Indigenous leader; previously the NDP candidate in Central Okanagan—Similkameen—Nicola during the 2021 Canadian federal election

== Result ==
British Columbia provincial by-election, June 24, 2023: Vancouver-Mount Pleasant Resignation of Melanie Mark
Party	Candidate	Votes	%	±%	Expenditures
New Democratic	Joan Phillip	5,459	67.79	+0.84	$52,059.61
BC United	Jackie Lee	1,101	13.67	+0.69	$57,476.94
Green	Wendy Hayko	931	11.56	–8.51	$7,328.43
Conservative	Karin Litzcke	395	4.91	New	$9,705.81
Communist	Kimball Cariou	167	2.07	New	$0.00
Total valid votes/expenses limit		8,053	99.74	—	$69,086.25
Total rejected ballots		21	0.26	–0.71	
Turnout		8,074	17.73	–30.28	
Registered voters		45,533			
New Democratic hold		Swing		+0.08	
Source: Elections BC

== Previous result ==
2020 British Columbia general election: Vancouver-Mount Pleasant
Party	Candidate	Votes	%	±%	Expenditures
New Democratic	Melanie Mark	14,530	66.95	+1.63	$22,210.72
Green	Kelly Tatham	4,356	20.07	+3.14	$5,570.94
Liberal	George Vassilas	2,816	12.98	−3.06	$8,413.63
Total valid votes		21,702	99.03	–	
Total rejected ballots		212	0.97	−0.07	
Turnout		21,914	48.01	−9.61	
Registered voters		45,644			
New Democratic hold		Swing		−0.76	
Source: Elections BC

== See also ==
- List of British Columbia by-elections
