= Solomon Yi-Kieran =

Canadian student leader and political activist

Vancouver City Councillor
- Incumbent
- Assumed office November 2, 2026

Personal details
- Party: Coalition of Progressive Electors (COPE)
- Other political affiliations: New Democratic
- Education: University of British Columbia
- Occupation: Politician; student

Solomon Yi-Kieran is a Canadian student leader and politician serving as a Vancouver city councillor. They were elected in the 2026 Vancouver municipal election as a member of the Coalition of Progressive Electors. They are known for their activism regarding the extension of the Millennium Line SkyTrain route and their involvement in student government at the University of British Columbia, serving as a student senator and as vice-president external of the Alma Mater Society of the University of British Columbia. Their advocacy has focused on housing affordability, public transit, student rights, accessibility, climate initiatives, and post-secondary education policy.

== Early life and education ==
Yi-Kieran completed their high school at Glenlyon Norfolk School before studying history and linguistics at the University of British Columbia (UBC). During their time at UBC, they became involved in student governance and advocacy organisations, including the UBC Disabilities United Collective, where they served in a leadership role. They later served as a student senator on the UBC Senate, the university's academic governing body.

== Student politics ==
=== UBC Senate ===
Yi-Kieran was elected as a student senator at UBC. During their tenure, they advocated for academic accessibility, increased transparency in university governance, improved accommodation procedures for students with disabilities, expanded lecture recording policies, and reforms to academic support systems.

As a senator, they also participated in the Student Senate Caucus and were involved in discussions relating to academic policy, student services, and governance reform.

=== AMS vice-president external ===
In 2025, Yi-Kieran was elected vice-president external of the Alma Mater Society (AMS), the student society representing UBC students.

As vice-president external, they represented students before municipal, provincial, and federal governments. Their platform focused on affordability, housing rights, public transit, and government relations. During their campaign, they advocated for applying provincial tenancy protections to student housing and expanding student affordability programs.

Throughout their term, Yi-Kieran worked with student organisations, labour groups, and advocacy coalitions on issues affecting post-secondary students across British Columbia.

== Advocacy ==
=== SkyTrain to UBC campaign ===
Yi-Kieran's tenure as AMS vice-president external was prominently known for their advocacy for extending the Millennium Line SkyTrain route to the University of British Columbia.

Yi-Kieran launched and promoted a petition campaign supporting rapid transit expansion to UBC, which collected more than 15,000 signatures. They also organised public rallies and lobbying efforts intended to increase public and governmental support for the project.

The campaign sought to renew political attention on the proposed extension, which had been discussed for many years but had not advanced to construction.

In January 2026, Yi-Kieran and the AMS organised a symbolic event marking the eighteenth anniversary of the provincial government's commitment to extend SkyTrain service to UBC. At the event, Yi-Kieran called for the provincial government to release a timeline for the planning, construction and completion of the project, and argued that the extension could increase transport capacity and support transit-oriented housing development along the corridor.

=== Housing advocacy ===
Yi-Kieran advocated for housing affordability and tenant protections, calling for stronger tenancy protections for students living in university-operated housing and increased construction of affordable and non-market housing in the University Endowment Lands. They also supported policies encouraging rent-controlled and below-market housing developments near UBC.

=== Government relations and lobbying ===
As AMS vice-president external, Yi-Kieran participated in provincial and federal lobbying efforts on behalf of students. During the AMS's 2025 provincial lobbying trip, they met with approximately 50 members of the Legislative Assembly of British Columbia to advocate for student priorities, including food-security grants for campus food banks, increased student financial aid, expansion of the B.C. Access Grant, a proposed $10 BC Ferries student fare, and the extension of the Millennium Line SkyTrain to UBC.

During the lobbying campaign, Yi-Kieran advocated for provincial support for campus food banks, citing rising food insecurity among post-secondary students. They also voiced concerns regarding the Government of British Columbia's review of the public post-secondary education system and advocated for maintaining domestic tuition protections.

Yi-Kieran additionally led a campaign promoting the extension of SkyTrain service to UBC. In November 2025, a petition organized by the AMS was presented in the Legislative Assembly of British Columbia by Nanaimo–Lantzville MLA George Anderson during Question Period.

== Municipal politics ==
Yi-Kieran was elected to Vancouver city council as a member of the Coalition of Progressive Electors (COPE) during the 2026 municipal election, becoming the youngest city councilor in Vancouver's history. They campaigned on issues including housing affordability, public transit, labour rights, climate action, and municipal governance reform.
