= Vancouver Liberal Electors Association =

Municipal political party in Canada

- Leader: Kareem Allam
- Founded: July 3, 2025
- Split from: ABC Vancouver
- Ideology: Liberalism (Canadian)
- Political position: Centre
- Colours: Red
- City council: 0 / 11
- Park board: 0 / 7
- School board: 0 / 9

Website
- www.vancouverliberals.com

The Vancouver Liberal Electors Association, commonly known as the Vancouver Liberals, is a municipal political party in Vancouver, British Columbia, Canada. It is not affiliated with either the provincial BC United (formerly known as the BC Liberals) or the federal Liberal Party of Canada.

The party was founded by political strategist and lobbyist Kareem Allam, the former chief of staff to ABC Vancouver leader Ken Sim. He left his role in Sim's mayoral office in February 2023, following a dispute with the mayor. Allam was the campaign manager for ABC Vancouver in 2022. He was also the campaign manager for Erin O'Toole and Kevin Falcon's respective party leadership campaigns. Sim filed a lawsuit against Allam in 2025 over alleged defamatory comments that claimed he had been pulled over by police for driving under the influence and used his position as mayor to cover it up. Allam became the party's candidate for mayor in the 2026 Vancouver municipal election. He had endorsed the BC NDP in the 2024 provincial election, describing himself as an opponent of Trumpism and a supporter of big-tent political parties. Park board commissioner Scott Jensen joined the party in January 2026. School Board chair Victoria Jung announced that she would seek the party's nomination to run for city council in late January 2026. On February 17, 2026, independent park board commissioner Brennan Bastyovanszky announced that he had joined the party in advance of the 2026 elections. On August 27, 2026, the party announced former MLA and provincial cabinet minister Michelle Mungall and advocate Arminder Randhawa as honorary co-chairs of its 2026 campaign.

The party contested its first municipal election in 2026, with Allam finishing fourth in the mayoral race. None of its candidates were elected to city council, the park board or the school board.

== 2026 municipal election ==
The party ran candidates for mayor, city council, the park board and the school board in the 2026 Vancouver municipal election, held on October 17, 2026.

=== Candidates ===
The party ran the following candidates in the 2026 Vancouver municipal election.

==== Mayor ====
- Kareem Allam

==== City council ====
- Devin Clemens, a graduate programs manager at the University of British Columbia
- John Coupar, former Non-Partisan Association Vancouver Park Board commissioner and Conservative Party of British Columbia candidate in the 2024 British Columbia election for Vancouver-Little Mountain
- Victoria Jung, the outgoing chair of the Vancouver School Board
- Moira Stilwell, a physician and former provincial cabinet minister
- Armor Valor, a cook at BC Children's Hospital and Hospital Employees' Union member
- Jessica Walton, a political strategist and government copywriter
- Michael Wu, an entrepreneur and 2024 BC Conservative candidate in Burnaby North

==== Park board ====
- Amanda Bains, a small business owner and Hospital Employees' Union member
- Amir Bajehkian, a Vancouver International Airport flight data analyst and civic engagement advocate for new Canadians
- Tricia Barker, a personal trainer and former Vancouver Park Board commissioner (2018–2022) with the NPA and park board candidate for TEAM for a Livable Vancouver in the 2022 election
- Brennan Bastyovanszky, an outgoing Vancouver Park Board commissioner and former chair originally elected as part of ABC Vancouver
- Shayla Bird, an educator and public historian specializing in Black history in British Columbia
- Mark Halyk, a former senior leader in Commercial Services at the Vancouver Park Board
- Scott Jensen, an outgoing park board commissioner and the board's first Indigenous chair

==== School board ====
- Joshua Cameron, a hospitality industry worker and University of Victoria political science graduate
- Isabel Ochoa, who works in Vancouver's sport and culture sector
- Ishi Dinim, a longtime member of the Vancouver School Board's District Parent Advisory Council
- Darren Boidman, a talent manager in the film and television industry
- Noosha Mehdian, an educator and researcher in higher education

== Electoral results ==
=== Mayoral elections ===
Election	Candidate	Votes	%	Position	Result
2026	Kareem Allam	10,580	5.13	4th	Not elected

=== Council elections ===
Vancouver City Council
Election	Seats	+/–	Votes	%	Change (pp)	Status
2026	0 / 11	–	125,358	7.58	–	No seats
