= Stewart Phillip =

Okanagan Aboriginal leader

Grand Chief Stewart Phillip
- ʔaʔsiwɬ
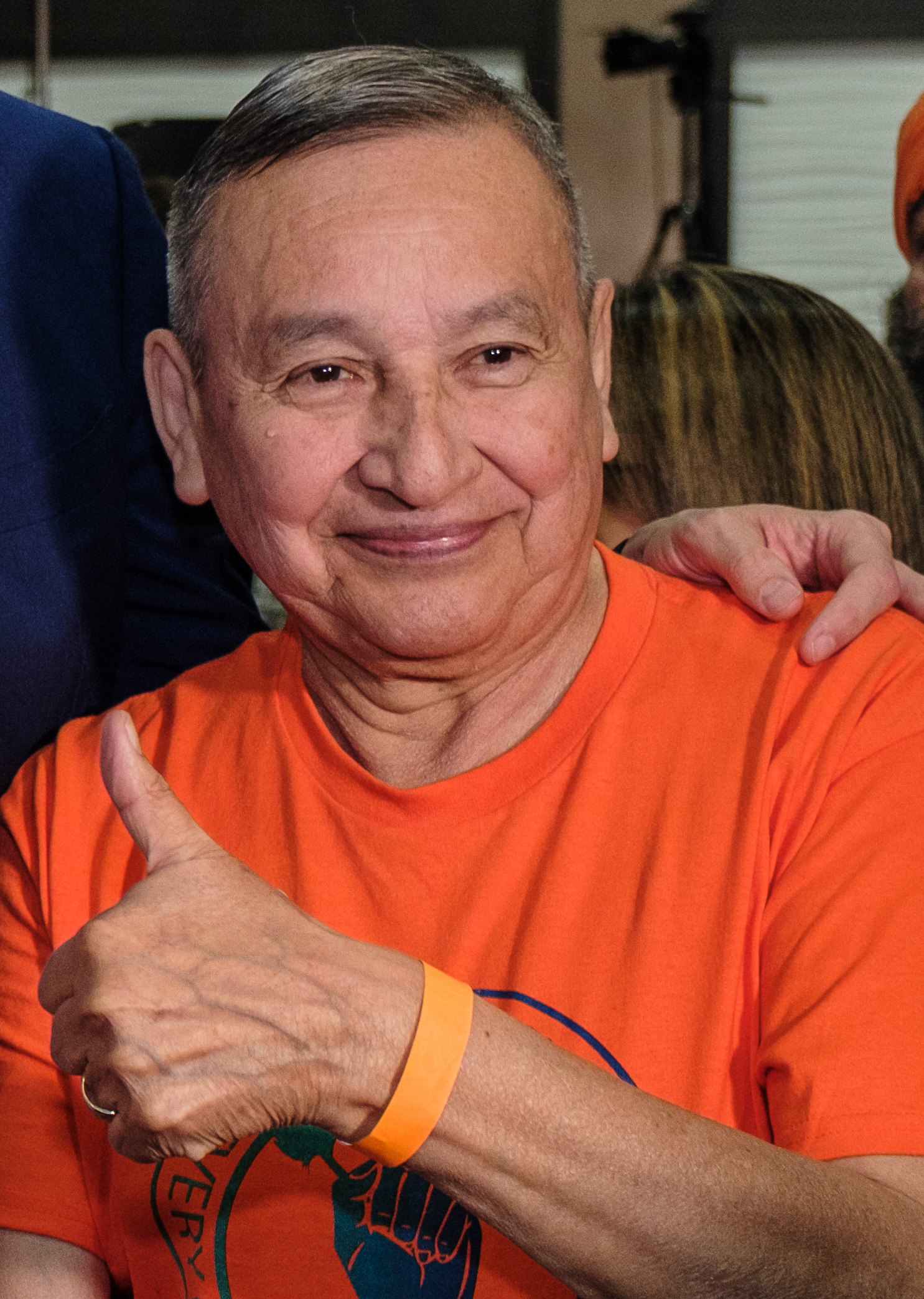
- Phillip in 2024
- Citizenship: Syilx/Okanagan
- Spouse: Joan Phillip (died 2026)

Grand Chief Stewart Phillip is an Okanagan Aboriginal leader who has served as president of the Union of British Columbia Indian Chiefs since 1998. As chief of the Penticton Indian Band in British Columbia from 1994 until 2008, as well as chair of the Okanagan Nation Alliance, he has advocated for Aboriginal rights for the First Nations in that province, particularly in the Okanagan region. He was awarded the title Grand Chief by the Okanagan Nation in 2006 in honour of his lifetime of commitment to and work for Indigenous rights and title.

== Activism ==
In 2002, Phillip drew media attention when he successfully forced a film project about the Aboriginal legend of the Ogopogo to be renamed Mee-Shee: The Water Giant. He did so by claiming, "It's an international concern among indigenous people about the exploitation of spiritual entities... for commercial purposes."

On November 26, 2014, Phillip told delegates at the British Columbia Federation of Labour convention that he would get arrested as a matter of principle to protest Kinder Morgan’s plans to expand the Trans Mountain pipeline. The following day, Phillip joined protesters at a Kinder Morgan borehole site on Burnaby Mountain. "We are making a very clear public statement that we do not support the Harper and Clark governments when it comes to resources," he said before his arrest. He has been arrested four other times while fighting for Indigenous rights.

In 2026, Phillip endorsed Heather McPherson in that year's federal NDP leadership race.

In 2026, Phillip endorsed David Eby for premier and Emily Lowan in her riding during the 2026 British Columbia general election.

In an interview with Global News following the 2026 British Columbia general election, which saw a Conservative majority, Phillip described any attempt at repealing DRIPA by the government-elect as, "a declaration of war."

== Awards ==
In 2017, Grand Chief Stewart Phillip and his wife, Joan Phillip, were awarded the Eugene Rogers Environmental Award by the Wilderness Committee "for their decades of commitment to preserving and protecting lands, waters and the environment for future generations." In November 2018, Phillip will receive an honorary Doctor of Laws from the University of British Columbia.

== Family ==
Phillip was married to Joan Phillip until she died in 2026, whom he described as having "it all. Courage, principles, integrity, hard-working and dedicated." He has six children and 15 grandchildren. He loves fishing, camping, and hunting.
