= Communist Party of British Columbia =

Provincial political party in Canada

- Leader: Robert Crooks
- Founded: 1924
- Headquarters: 706 Clark Drive; Vancouver, BC; V5L 3J1
- Ideology: Communism; Marxism–Leninism
- Political position: Far-left
- National affiliation: Communist Party of Canada
- Seats in the Legislative Assembly: 0 / 93

Website
- www.cpcbc.ca

The Communist Party of British Columbia (CPC BC) is the provincial section of the Communist Party of Canada in British Columbia. From the 1945 election to the 1956 election, it was known as the Labor-Progressive Party, initially due to the Communist Party having been banned under the Defence of Canada Regulations.

== Leadership ==
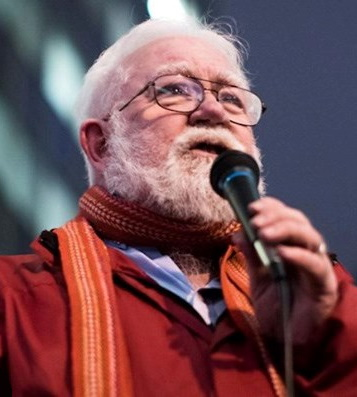
Kimball Cariou, party leader from 2020 to 2025

Kimball was the long-time editor of People's Voice, the newspaper of the federal CPC, before he was elected as the leader of the BC section in December 2020. He was succeeded by Robert Crooks, who was elected party leader at the party's provincial convention from July 5 to 6, 2025. Cariou was elected to a newly-created, five-member executive body at the same convention.

== Newspapers ==
In contrast to other provincial sections of the Communist Party of Canada, the Communist Party of British Columbia published its own newspapers for nearly six decades, including the B.C. Worker's News (1935–1937), People's Advocate (1937–1940), Vancouver Clarion (1940–1941), Pacific Advocate (1942–1945), and Pacific Tribune (1946–1992).

== Election history ==
Election	Candidates	Seats won	Votes	%
1937	1	0	567	0.14
1945	21	0	16,479	3.52
1949	2	0	1,660	0.24
1952	5	0	2,514	0.33
1953	25	0	7,496	1.03
1956	14	0	3,381	0.41
1960	19	0	5,675	0.57
1963	4	0	849	0.09
1966	6	0	1,097	0.14
1969	4	0	482	0.05
1972	5	0	862	0.08
1975	13	0	1,441	0.11
1979	7	0	1,159	0.08
1983	4	0	837	0.05
1986	3	0	722	0.03
1991	3	0	92	0.01
1996	3	0	218	0.01
2001	4	0	381	0.02
2005	3	0	244	0.01
2009	3	0	433	0.03
2013	4	0	388	0.02
2017	6	0	802	0.04
2020	5	0	786	0.04
2024	3	0	617	0.03
2026	4	0	559	0.00
