= List of LGBTQ politicians in Canada =

The following is a non-exhaustive list of LGBTQ politicians in Canada who have been identified or acknowledged on public record. The list is grouped by members of the two houses of the federal parliament, provincial legislatures, mayors, municipal councillors, and others.

== Federal politicians ==
=== House of Commons ===
Canada got its first openly gay MP in February 1988 when Svend Robinson, an NDP MP first elected in 1979 representing the riding of Burnaby, came out publicly. Despite facing much abuse after the announcement, he went on to become one of the longest-serving MPs with 25 years in parliament. In the following 16 years until Robinson stepped down in 2004, three other sitting MPs came out while in office - Réal Ménard of the Bloc, Robinson's close ally and fellow BC NDP MP Libby Davies, and Nova Scotia Progressive Conservative MP Scott Brison who crossed the floor to the Liberals a year after coming out and went on to become the first openly LGBTQ cabinet minister, serving in the cabinet of both Paul Martin and Justin Trudeau. The 2004 general election returned the first two MPs who were openly gay when first elected: Robinson's aide and successor Bill Siksay and Ontario Liberal MP Mario Silva, and brought the number of openly LGBTQ sitting MPs to five. The 2021 general election returned nine openly LGBTQ MPs, the high watermark for LGBT representation in parliament and with representation from the three main national parties (four Liberals, three NDPs, and two Conservatives). Three of those MPs served in cabinet concurrently between 2021 and 2024, the highest number of LGBTQ cabinet members to date.

==== Number of openly LGBTQ MPs in each Parliament ====
Parliament		Openly LGBT MPs					Ministry / Openly LGBT cabinet members	
Duration	Seats	Lib	Con /P.C.	NDP	BQ	Total	Ministry / Openly LGBT cabinet members	
33rd (1984 - 1988)	282			1 Robinson (Note: Robinson announced that he was gay in toward the end of the 33rd parliament, in February 1988.)		1	24th (Mulroney)	0
34th (1988 - 1993)	295			1 Robinson		1	24th (Mulroney)	0
34th (1988 - 1993)	295			1 Robinson		1	25th (Campbell)	0
35th (1993 - 1997)	295			1 Robinson	1 Ménard (Note: Menard acknowledged his own sexuality for the first time during debate on April 26, 1995 by stating in the middle of a speech "(l)a communauté gaie à laquelle j'appartiens est une belle communauté." ("the gay community, to which I belong, is a fine community"). Prior to this date, he participated in debate referring the LGBT community as a third party.)	2	26th (Chrétien)	0
36th (1997 - 2000)	301			2 Robinson; Davies	1 Ménard	3	26th (Chrétien)	0
37th (2000 - 2004)	301		~~1~~; ~~Brison~~	2 Robinson; Davies	1 Ménard	4	26th (Chrétien)	0
37th (2000 - 2004)	301	1 Brison (Note: Brison came out in December 2002 in advance of his 2003 Progressive Conservative leadership bid. He crossed the floor to the Liberal Party on December 10, 2003 following the merger of the Progressive Conservative Party and Canadian Alliance.)		2 Robinson; Davies	1 Ménard	4	27th (Martin)	0
38th (2004 - 2006)	308	2 Brison, Silva		2 Davies; Siksay	1 Ménard	5	27th (Martin)	1 Brison
39th (2006 - 2008)	308	2 Brison, Silva		2 Davies; Siksay	1 Ménard	5	28th (Harper)	0
40th (2008 - 2011)	308	3 Brison, Silva; Oliphant		2 Davies; Siksay	1 ➘ 0 Ménard (Note: Ménard resigned September 16, 2009 to run as a Vision Montreal candidate for borough mayor of Mercier–Hochelaga-Maisonneuve in Montreal and was elected.)	6 ➘ 5	28th (Harper)	0
41st (2011 - 2015)	308	1 Brison		4 ➚ 5 (Note: Scott elected in a byelection triggered by the death of NDP leader Jack Layton); Davies, Garrison; Morin, Toone, Scott		5 ➚ 6	28th (Harper)	0
42nd (2015 - 2019)	338	4 ➘ 3 (Note: Resigned from cabinet on January 14 and from parliament on February 10, 2019.); Brison, Oliphant; Boissonnault; O'Regan		2 Garrison, Benson		6 ➘ 5	29th (J.Trudeau)	2 ➘ 1 Brison; O'Regan
43rd (2019 - 2021)	338	2 Oliphant, O'Regan	1 Duncan	1 Garrison		4	29th (J.Trudeau)	1 O'Regan
44th (2021 - 2025)	338	4 Oliphant, O'Regan; Boissonnault; St-Onge	2 Duncan; Lastman	3 Garrison, Barron; Desjarlais		9	29th (J.Trudeau)	3 O'Regan; Boissonnault; St-Onge
45th (Elected 2025)	343	3 Oliphant; Klassen; Chang	2 Duncan; Lastman			4	30th (Carney)	0

LEGEND

Light purple background : indicates the person was not openly LGBT while in office (entire row) or when first elected (first elected cell).
Term of Office: Year without specific date indicates at general election held that year

Party affiliation:

█ Liberal █ Conservative █ New Democratic	█ Bloc Québécois █ Progressive Conservative

==== Incumbent MPs ====
Member	Province (electoral district)	First elected	Notes
Hon. Rob Oliphant (b. 1956)	Ontario (Don Valley West)	2008 (out of office 2011-15)	Privy Counsellor (since 2021), Parliamentary Secretary to the Minister of Foreign Affairs (since 2019). The most senior out legislator (by first election) currently in office (as of October 2024) (Note: Upon the retirement of BC NDP MLA Nicholas Simons from the legislature at dissolution in advance of the 2024 BC provincial election. Ontario MP Rob Oliphant was first elected in the 2008 federal election which took place two weeks prior to the provincial byelection that elected Spencer Chandra Herbert. Chandra Herbert's tenure is however continuous, while Oliphant was out of office from 2011 to 2015.)
Eric Duncan (b. 1987)	Ontario (Stormont—Dundas—Glengarry)	2019	
Melissa Lantsman (b. 1984)	Ontario (Thornhill)	2021	Deputy Leader of the Official Opposition (since September 2022)
Wade Chang (b. 1985/86)	British Columbia (Burnaby Central)	2025	
Ernie Klassen	British Columbia (South Surrey—White Rock)	2025	Parliamentary Secretary to the Minister of Fisheries (since June 2025)

==== Former MPs ====
Member	Province (electoral district)	Term		Notes
Member	Province (electoral district)	Start	End	Notes
Hon. Heward Grafftey (1928–2010)	Quebec (Brome—Missisquoi)	1958	1968 (defeated)	Came out publicly after retirement from parliament. Cabinet minister in the Clark ministry
Hon. Heward Grafftey (1928–2010)	Quebec (Brome—Missisquoi)	1972	1980 (defeated)	Came out publicly after retirement from parliament. Cabinet minister in the Clark ministry
Hon. Charles Lapointe (b. 1944)	Quebec (Charlevoix)	1974	1984 (defeated)	Came out after retirement from parliament Cabinet minister in both of P.E. Trudeau ministries (20th & 22nd)
Svend Robinson (b. 1952)	British Columbia (Burnaby—Douglas)	1979	2004 (stood down)	Became the first openly LGBT sitting MP when came out publicly while in office in 1988
Ian Waddell (1942–2021)	British Columbia (Vancouver Kingsway 1979–1988, Port Moody—Coquitlam—Port Coquitlam 1988–93)	1979	1993 (defeated)	Later BC MLA (1996–2001) and minister (1998–2001). Came out as bisexual during his 2004 bid to return to parliament.
Réal Ménard (b. 1962)	Quebec (Hochelaga)	1993	2009-09-16 (resigned)	First LGBT MP from Quebec.
Hon. Scott Brison (b. 1967)	Nova Scotia (Kings—Hants)	1997	2000-07-24 (resigned)	Came out publicly while in office in 2002; First openly LGBTQ member of cabinet, minister in the Martin and J. Trudeau ministries First openly LGBT MP from Nova Scotia; First openly LGBT candidate for the leadership of the Progressive Conservative (2003) and the Liberal (2006) parties Crossed the floor from Progressive Conservative to the Liberal in 2003.
Hon. Scott Brison (b. 1967)	Nova Scotia (Kings—Hants)	2000	2019-02-10 (resigned)	Came out publicly while in office in 2002; First openly LGBTQ member of cabinet, minister in the Martin and J. Trudeau ministries First openly LGBT MP from Nova Scotia; First openly LGBT candidate for the leadership of the Progressive Conservative (2003) and the Liberal (2006) parties Crossed the floor from Progressive Conservative to the Liberal in 2003.
Libby Davies (b. 1953)	British Columbia (Vancouver East)	1997	2015 (stood down)	Became the first openly LGBT woman in parliament when she publicly revealed in 2001 that she was in a same-sex relationship.
Bill Siksay (b. 1955)	British Columbia (Burnaby—Douglas)	2004	2011 (stood down)	First LGBT MP who was openly LGBT when first elected (along with Mario Silva)
Mario Silva (b. 1966)	Ontario (Davenport)	2004	2011 (defeated)	First LGBT MP who was openly LGBT when first elected (along with Bill Siksay); First LGBT MP from Ontario
Raymond Gravel (1952–2014)	Quebec (Repentigny)	2006-11-27	2008 (stood down)	As a Catholic priest received bishop's dispensation to seek election, but was later ordered by the Vatican to stand down. Did not came out publicly during his lifetime, acknowledged his homosexuality to biographer.
Randall Garrison (b. 1950)	British Columbia (Esquimalt—Saanich—Sooke)	2011	2025 (stood down)	
Dany Morin (b. 1985)	Quebec (Chicoutimi—Le Fjord)	2011	2015 (defeated)	
Philip Toone (b. 1965)	Quebec (Gaspésie—Îles-de-la-Madeleine)	2011	2015 (defeated)	
Craig Scott (b. 1962)	Ontario (Toronto Danforth)	2012-03-19	2015 (defeated)	
Sheri Benson (b. 1963)	Saskatchewan (Saskatoon West)	2015	2019 (defeated)	First LGBT MP from Saskatchewan; Deputy leader of the NDP (2019)
Hon. Randy Boissonnault (b. 1970)	Alberta (Edmonton Centre)	2015	2019 (defeated)	First LGBT MP from Alberta; Cabinet minister in the J. Trudeau ministry (2021–24)
Hon. Randy Boissonnault (b. 1970)	Alberta (Edmonton Centre)	2021	2025 (stood down)	First LGBT MP from Alberta; Cabinet minister in the J. Trudeau ministry (2021–24)
Hon. Seamus O'Regan (b. 1971)	Newfoundland and Labrador (St. John's South—Mount Pearl)	2015	2025 (stood down)	First LGBT MP from Newfoundland and Labrador; Cabinet minister in the J. Trudeau ministry (2017–24)
Lisa Marie Barron	British Columbia (Nanaimo—Ladysmith)	2021	2025 (defeated)	
Blake Desjarlais (b. 1993)	Alberta (Edmonton Griesbach)	2021	2025 (defeated)	First MP to be identified as two-spirit
Hon. Pascale St-Onge (b. 1977)	Quebec (Brome—Missisquoi)	2021	2025 (stood down)	First lesbian cabinet minister, minister in the J. Trudeau ministry (2021–24)

=== Senate ===
Party affiliation or grouping: █ Liberal █ Conservative █ Independent Senators Group █ Progressive Senate Group

==== Incumbent Senators ====
Senator	Province (division)	Term		Notes
Senator	Province (division)	Appointed on advice of	Mandatory Retirement	Notes
Hon. René Cormier (b. 1956)	New Brunswick	2016-11-10 (J. Trudeau)	2031-04-27	
Hon. Kim Pate (b. 1959)	Ontario	2016-11-10} (J. Trudeau)	2034-11-10	
Hon. Marnie McBean (b. 1968)	Ontario	2023-12-20 (J. Trudeau)	2043-01-28	
Hon. Kristopher Wells (b. 1971)	Alberta	2024-08-31 (J. Trudeau)	2046-10-07	
Hon. Martine Hébert (b. 1965)	Quebec (Victoria)	2025-02-27 (J. Trudeau)	2040-10-07	
Hon. Duncan Wilson (b. 1967)	British Columbia	2025-02-28 (J. Trudeau)	2042-09-26	

==== Former senators ====
Senator	Province (division)	Term		Notes
Senator	Province (division)	Appointed on advice of	End	Notes
Hon. Laurier LaPierre (1929–2012)	Ontario	2001-06-13; Chrétien	2004-11-21	First openly LGBT person to be appointed senator
Hon. Nancy Ruth (b. 1942)	Ontario (Cluny) (Note: Senators from provinces other than Quebec may name a senatorial designation of their own choosing, or use their province as their senatorial division by default.)	2005-03-24 (Martin)	2017-01-06	First out lesbian to be appointed to senator. Initially affiliated with the Progressive Conservative (2005–08), joined the Conservative caucus in March 2008.

=== List of openly LGBTQ party leaders ===
Leader	Leadership	In Office		Notes
Leader	Leadership	Start	End	Notes
Amita Kuttner (b. 1990) not elected to the House of Commons	Interim Leader of the Green Party of Canada	November 2021	November 2022	First transgender person to lead a federal party in Canada.
Jonathan Pedneault (b. 1990) not elected to the House of Commons	Co-leader of the Green Party of Canada	February 2025	April 2025	Led party in the 2025 federal election with Elizabeth May.

== Provincial/territorial politicians ==
Peter Maloney was Canada's first known openly gay candidate for political office. The first locatable media reference to Maloney publicly identifying as gay is of a national Liberal Party policy conference in early 1972, several months after his unsuccessful candidacy in the 1971 Ontario general election; later the same year, he unequivocally earned the distinction regardless, when he ran as an out gay candidate for the Toronto Board of Education in the 1972 municipal election. Robert Douglas Cook, a Gay Alliance Toward Equality candidate for the electoral district of West Vancouver-Howe Sound in the 1979 British Columbia provincial election, has also been credited as Canada's first openly LGBTQ political candidate by some media outlets, but was in fact merely the first to run as a candidate of an explicitly gay-identified advocacy organization rather than a traditional political party or for a non-partisan office. Other confirmed LGBTQ candidates who preceded Cook included Ian Maclennan running for a seat on the Ottawa Board of Education in 1976; Therese Faubert running as a League for Socialist Action candidate in Brampton and Frank Lowery running as an Ontario New Democratic Party candidate in Scarborough North in the 1977 Ontario provincial election; Dean Haynes running for Toronto City Council in 1978, although he withdrew from the race before election day; and Jim Monk running for the Windsor Board of Education in 1978. George Hislop was a candidate for Toronto City Council in 1980, and later ran as an independent candidate for St. George in the 1981 Ontario general election.

The first documented LGBT provincial politician actually predated confederation. George Herchmer Markland, a protegee of Bishop John Strachan, was first appointed to the Legislative Council of Upper Canada in 1820, and to the Executive Council in 1822 when he was only 32. A leading figure of the Family Compact by the late 1830s, he resigned from all public offices in 1838 in exchange for having the investigation into his potential liaisons with several young men dropped. Richard Hatfield of the Progressive Conservative Party of New Brunswick never acknowledged his sexuality to the public during his lifetime and it was not until three years after his death that his sexuality was formally confirmed in the press by cabinet colleagues and journalists.

Quebec is the home of the first openly LGBTQ legislator in Canada, electing in 1985 Liberal MNA Maurice Richard (who also has the distinction of being the first openly LGBTQ person elected to any public office in Canada, having been elected mayor of Bécancour in 1976). The province further produced Canada's next two out provincial legislators when it elected André Boisclair and André Boulerice in 1989. Boisclair, the record holder as the youngest MNA until 2007, has the distinction of being the first out LGBTQ Cabinet minister anywhere in Canada, having been tapped to join Lucien Bouchard's cabinet as immigration minister in 1996. Boulerice joined the Landry ministry as a secretary of state (junior minister) in March 2001, which made him the third out cabinet minister in Canada.

In the English-speaking provinces, British Columbia in 1996 elected its first two openly gay MLAs, NDPer Tim Stevenson and Liberal Ted Nebbeling; both of whom went on to serve in provincial cabinet later. Stevenson became employment minister in 2000, toward the end of the NDP time in power, making him the second out cabinet minister in Canada, and Nebbeling joined the Campbell ministry as a minister of state when the Liberals ousted the NDP in June 2001. Ontario and Manitoba both elected their first out legislator in 1999, with Ontario Liberal George Smitherman in June and Manitoba NDPer Jim Rondeau in September. They would both become their respective province's first out cabinet member in 2003, Smitherman in June as health minister when the Liberals formed government and Rondeau in November as a junior minister of health after a term on the backbench.

First elected as an Ontario Liberal MPP in October 2003, Kathleen Wynne was the first out woman to serve in a provincial legislature, and the first out woman to be elected at either the federal or provincial levels. (NDP MP Libby Davies came out in 2001 but did not face re-election as an out woman until 2004) Parti Quebecois MNA Agnès Maltais, who was first elected in 1998, became the second out woman in a provincial legislature when she came out in November 2003, and secured her first reelection as an out women in March 2007, just two months ahead of Manitoba's NDP MLA Jennifer Howard, the third out women in a provincial legislature. Wynne was also the first out woman cabinet minister anywhere in Canada, having been appointed education minister in the in McGuinty ministry in September 2006. Howard joined the Doer ministry in Manitoba in 2009 as labour and immigration minister, which made her the second out woman cabinet minister in Canada, and would later serve as finance minister in the Selinger ministry before resigning with four other cabinet members in 2014 to call for Selinger's ouster. While Maltais previously served in cabinet under Premiers Bouchard and Landry, the PQ did not return to power until the third election after her coming out (slipping briefly to third place under out leader Bosclair), delaying her chance to serve as an out woman cabinet minister until September 2012, when she joined the Marois government as employment and labour minister.

With the election of New Brunswick Liberal MLA Luke Randall in 2024, all Canadian provinces and territories have elected at least one openly LGBTQ member to their legislature. Two Canadian provinces have been governed by openly LGBTQ premiers: Kathleen Wynne was premier of Ontario from 2013 to 2018, while Wade MacLauchlan was premier of Prince Edward Island from 2015 to 2019. Openly LGBTQ politicians have been Cabinet ministers in Alberta, British Columbia, Ontario, Manitoba, Nova Scotia, New Brunswick, Prince Edward Island, and Quebec. There are two openly LGBTQ people serving as leaders of provincial or territorial parties: the Conservative Party of Quebec's Éric Duhaime and the Quebec Liberal Party's Charles Milliard.

=== Overview ===
LEGEND

Light purple background : indicates the person was not openly LGBT while in office (entire row) or when first elected (first elected cell)
Term of Office: Year without specific date indicates at general election held that year
Party affiliation:

All provinces not otherwise specified:
█ Liberal
█ Progressive Conservative
█ New Democratic

Specific to Quebec:
█ Coalition Avenir Québec
█ Québec solidaire
█ Parti Québécois

Specific to British Columbia:
█ Conservative
█ Liberal

(As of the conclusion of the November 2025 Newfoundland & Labrador election)

Status of Members	BC	AB	SK	MB	ON	QC	NB	NS	PE	NL	YK	NT	NU	Total	Fed
Latest election	2024	2023	2024	2023	2025	2022	2024	2024	2023	2025	2025	2023	2021		2025
in cabinet	2			2			1							5	
in government caucus	1			2						1				4	2
in opposition	1	3	1		4	1		2		1	2		1	18	2
in opposition	1	3	1		4	1		2		1	2		1	18	2
in opposition	1	3	1		1	1		2		1	2		1	18	2
Total	4	3	1	4	5	3	1	2	0	2	1	0	1	27	4

==== Incumbent MLAs/MPPs/MNAs/MHAs ====
Member	Province (electoral district)	First Elected	Notes
Mike Farnworth	British Columbia (Port Coquitlam)	1991 (out of office 2001 to 2005)	Publicly acknowledged being gay during his 2011 bid for NDP leadership (was runner up to Adrian Dix), also a contestant in 2014 leadership contest (withdraw resulting in the acclaimation of John Horgan); Currently the longest serving MLA in the Legislative Assembly of British Columbia, and the longest serving elected public office holder among all out politicians currently in office. (Note: Since Farnworth did not come out publicly until 2011, his tenure as an out public office holder would rank behind those of his two out caucus colleagues Spencer Chandra Herbert and Mable Elmore, and Liberal MP Rob Oliphant, the three current office holders elected before 2011 and were out at the start of their time in public offices.); Cabinet Member: G. Clark, Miller, Dosanjh ministries 1997–2001 and the Horgan and Eby ministries since 2017, served as Deputy Premier 2021–24
Spencer Chandra Herbert	British Columbia (Vancouver-West End)	2008-10-29	The most senior out legislator with continuous tenure currently in office (as of October 2024). Served three additional years as an elected Vancouver Park Board Commissioner prior to being elected MLA. Cabinet Member: Eby ministry since 2024
Mable Elmore	British Columbia (Vancouver-Kensington)	2009	The most senior out woman legislator currently in office (as of May 2022) (Note: Upon the retirement of former Ontario Premier Kathleen Wynne at the dissolution of the Ontario Legislative Assembly prior to the 2022 Ontario election)
Manon Massé	Quebec (Sainte-Marie–Saint-Jacques)	2014	Party Leader: Co-spokesperson (co-leader) of the Québec solidaire 2017–23
Terence Kernaghan	Ontario (London North Centre)	2018	
Youri Chassin	Quebec (Saint-Jérôme)	2018	
Jennifer Maccarone	Quebec (Westmount–Saint-Louis)	2018	
Janis Irwin	Alberta (Edmonton-Highlands-Norwood)	2019	
Lela Evans	Newfoundland and Labrador (Torngat Mountains)	2019	Left the PCs to sit as an independent in 2021, joined the NDP in 2022, and returned to the PCs in 2024
Uzoma Asagwara	Manitoba (Union Station)	2019	Cabinet member: Deputy Premier and minister in the Kinew ministry since 2023
Lisa Naylor	Manitoba (Wolseley)	2019	Cabinet member: Kinew ministry since 2023
Lane Tredger	Yukon (Whitehorse Centre)	2021	Yukon's first out non-binary MLA, formally changed name while in office in 2023; House leader of the Yukon NDP (since 2021)
Lisa Lachance	Nova Scotia (Halifax Citadel-Sable Island)	2021	
Janet Brewster	Nunavut (Iqaluit-Sinaa)	2021	
Lise Vaugeois	Ontario (Thunder Bay—Superior North)	2022	
Kristyn Wong-Tam	Ontario (Toronto Centre)	2022	
Elenore Sturko	British Columbia (Surrey-Cloverdale)	2022-09-10	
Nathaniel Teed	Saskatchewan (Saskatoon Meewasin)	2022-09-26	First out MLA of Saskatchewan
Brooks Arcand-Paul	Alberta (Edmonton-West Henday)	2023	
Court Ellingson	Alberta (Calgary-Foothills)	2023	
Tyler Blashko	Manitoba (Lagimodière)	2023	
Logan Oxenham	Manitoba (Kirkfield Park)	2023	
Luke Randall	New Brunswick (Fredericton North)	2024	First out MLA of New Brunswick; Cabinet Member: Holt ministry since 2024
Rod Wilson	Nova Scotia (Halifax Armdale)	2024	
Catherine McKenney	Ontario (Ottawa Centre)	2025	
Tyler Watt	Ontario (Nepean)	2025	
Keith White	Newfoundland and Labrador (St. John's West)	2025	
Justin Ziegler	Yukon (Riverdale South)	2025	
Éric Duhaime	Quebec (Bellechasse)	2026	
Charles Milliard	Quebec (Orford)	2026	

==== Former MLAs/MPPs/MNAs/MHAs ====
Member	Province (electoral district)	In Office		Notes
Member	Province (electoral district)	Start	End	Notes
Richard Hatfield (1931–1991)	New Brunswick (Carleton Centre)	1961-06-19	1987	Never publicly acknowledged being gay during his lifetime, but generally known and assumed, and Hatfield generally did not bother to deny while Premier, his sexuality has been more formally discussed on the record by contemporaries after his death Cabinet Member: Premier of New Brunswick 1970–87
Claude Charron (b. 1946)	Quebec (Saint-Jacques)	1970	1982-04-13	Confirmed being gay in his memoir published in 1983. Cabinet Member: Lévesque government 1976-82
Guy Joron (1940–2017)	Quebec (Gouin)	1970	1973	Out among his caucus colleagues in the legislature, but not to the general public while in office. Cabinet Member: Lévesque government 1976-80
Guy Joron (1940–2017)	Quebec (Mille-Îles)	1976	1981	Out among his caucus colleagues in the legislature, but not to the general public while in office. Cabinet Member: Lévesque government 1976-80
Jan Dukszta (1932–2025)	Ontario (Parkdale)	1971	1981	Not out during his political career; sexuality became known on the public record only when his obituary upon his death in 2025 named his husband Max.
Keith Norton (1941–2010)	Ontario (Kingston and the Islands)	1975	1985	Came out in 1990 while seeking a comeback in the district that included Toronto's gay village Cabinet Member: Davis & Miller ministries 1977-85, held key portfolio including education, health
Dave Cooke (b. 1952)	Ontario (Windsor—Riverside)	1977	1997-01-19	Came out after retirement from the legislature Cabinet Member: Rae ministry 1990-95, held key portfolio including education, municipal affairs
Phil Gillies (b. 1954)	Ontario (Brantford)	1981	1987	Came out after retirement from the legislature Cabinet Member: Miller ministry 1985
Maurice Richard (b. 1946)	Quebec (Nicolet—Yamaska)	1985	1994	First provincial legislator in Canada to be out as gay during his career in politics.
Ian Scott (1934–2006)	Ontario (St. George—St. David)	1985	1992-04-04	Openly gay to political colleagues while in office, first public acknowledgement via partner's obituary a year after leaving public office. Cabinet Member: Attorney General in the Peterson ministry (1985–90)
André Boisclair (b. 1966)	Quebec (Gouin)	1989	2004-08-17	First openly LGBT person in Canada to lead a party represented in a legislature First openly LGBTQ person appointed to a cabinet in Canada (in 1996), held record as the youngest person elected MNA until 2007 Cabinet Member: Bouchard and Landry governments 1996-2003 Party Leader: Parti Québécois and Quebec's Leader of the Opposition(2005–07, )
André Boisclair (b. 1966)	Quebec (Pointe-aux-Trembles)	2006-08-14	2007-11-15	First openly LGBT person in Canada to lead a party represented in a legislature First openly LGBTQ person appointed to a cabinet in Canada (in 1996), held record as the youngest person elected MNA until 2007 Cabinet Member: Bouchard and Landry governments 1996-2003 Party Leader: Parti Québécois and Quebec's Leader of the Opposition(2005–07, )
André Boulerice (b. 1946)	Quebec (Sainte-Marie–Saint-Jacques)	1989	2005-09-12	Cabinet Member: Landry governments as secretary of state/minister delegate (junior Cabinet Minister) 2001-03
Dominic Agostino (1959–2004)	Ontario (Hamilton East)	1995	2004-03-24	Openly gay to political colleagues while in office.
Andrew Thomson (b. 1967)	Saskatchewan (Regina South)	1995	2007	Came out after retirement from the legislature Cabinet Member: Calvert ministry (2001–07), held key portfolios including finance
Ted Nebbeling (1943–2009)	British Columbia (West Vancouver-Garibaldi)	1996	2005	First openly LGBT MLA in British Columbia (along with Tim Stevenson); Cabinet Member: Campbell ministry
Ian Waddell (1942–2021)	British Columbia (Vancouver-Fraserview)	1996	2001	Came out after retirement from the legislature Served as MP 1979–88 Cabinet Member: Clark & Dosanjh ministries 1998-2001
Tim Stevenson (b. 1945)	British Columbia (Vancouver-Burrard)	1996	2001	First openly LGBT MLA in British Columbia (along with Ted Nebbeling); Cabinet Member: Dosanjh ministry 2000-01 as a minister of state
Agnès Maltais (b. 1956)	Quebec (Taschereau)	1998	2018	First lesbian MNA of Quebec, came out while in office in 2003; Cabinet Member: Bouchard, Landry and Marois governments 1998-2003, 2012–14
Jim Rondeau (b. 1959)	Manitoba (Assiniboia)	1999	2016	Manitoba's first openly LGBTQ MLA and cabinet minister Cabinet Member: Doer and Selinger ministries 2003-13
George Smitherman (b. 1964)	Ontario (Toronto Centre)	1999	2010-01-04	Ontario's First openly LGBT MPP (elected or being in office) and cabinet minister Cabinet Member: McGuinty ministry 2003-10, held key portfolios including health and energy, named Deputy Premier 2007-10
Dale Eftoda (b. 1949)	Yukon (Riverdale North)	2000	2002	
Cecil Clarke (b. 1968)	Nova Scotia (Cape Breton North)	2001-03-06	2011-03-25	Not out during his term in the legislature; came out later while serving as a mayor Speaker of the Nova Scotia House of Assembly (2006–07); Cabinet Member: Rodney MacDonald ministry
Lorne Mayencourt (b. 1957)	British Columbia (Vancouver-Burrard)	2001	2008-09-13	
Jim Watson (b. 1961)	Ontario (Ottawa West—Nepean)	2003	2010-02-01	Came out in 2019 while serving his fourth term as Mayor of Ottawa; Cabinet Member: McGuinty ministry
Kathleen Wynne (b. 1953)	Ontario (Don Valley West)	2003-10-02	2022	Canada's first openly LGBT first minister (2013–18); Ontario's first lesbian MPP and cabinet minister, Ontario's first women premier Ontario held the record as largest population with a LGBT government leader until 2024 (when Gabriel Attal was appointed Prime Minister of France); Cabinet Member: McGuinty and Wynne ministries 2006-18; Party Leader: Ontario Liberal Party (while in power 2013-18)
Doug Routley (b. 1961)	British Columbia (Nanaimo-North Cowichan)	2005	2024	Came out as bisexual in 2018 while in office
Nicholas Simons (b. 1964/65)	British Columbia (Powell River-Sunshine Coast)	2005	2024	Cabinet Member: Horgan and Eby ministries 2020-22
Cheri DiNovo (b. 1951)	Ontario (Parkdale—High Park)	2006-09-14	2017-12-31	
Paul Ferreira (b. 1973)	Ontario (York South—Weston)	2007-02-28	2007	
Sylvain Gaudreault (b. 1970)	Quebec (Jonquière)	2007	2022	Cabinet Member: Marois government 2012-14; Party Leader: Leader of the Opposition in Quebec & Interim Leader of the Parti Québécois (2016)
Jennifer Howard	Manitoba (Fort Rouge)	2007	2016	Cabinet Member: Selinger ministry 2009-14, held key portfolios including finance.
Jenn McGinn	British Columbia (Vancouver-Fairview)	2008-10-29	2009	British Columbia's first openly lesbian MLA
Glen Murray (b. 1957)	Ontario (Toronto Centre)	2010-02-04	2017-09-01	Cabinet Member: McGuinty & Wynne ministries 2010-17
Gerry Rogers (b. 1956)	Newfoundland and Labrador (St. John's Centre)	2011	2019	Newfoundland and Labrador's first openly LGBTA MHA
Réjean Hébert (b. 1955)	Quebec (Saint-François)	2012	2014	Cabinet Member: Marois government 2012-14 as Minister of Health and Social Services
Jennifer Rice (b. 1973/74)	British Columbia (North Coast)	2013	2024	
Joanne Bernard (b. 1963)	Nova Scotia (Dartmouth North)	2013	2017	Cabinet Member: McNeil ministry 2013-17
Wade MacLauchlan (b. 1954)	Prince Edward Island (York-Oyster Bed)	2015	2019	PEI's first openly LGBTQ Premier (2015–19) and MLA Cabinet Member: headed MacLauchlan ministry 2015-19
Michael Connolly (b. 1994)	Alberta (Calgary-Hawkwood)	2015	2019	
Ricardo Miranda (b. 1976)	Alberta Calgary-Cross)	2015	2019	Cabinet Member: Notley ministry 2016-19
Estefan Cortes-Vargas (b. 1991)	Alberta (Strathcona-Sherwood Park)	2015	2019	
Julie Green	Northwest Territories (Yellowknife Centre)	2015	2023	Cabinet Member: Member of the Executive Council of the Northwest Territories 2020-23
Jill Andrew	Ontario (Toronto—St. Paul's)	2018	2025	
Suze Morrison (b. 1988)	Ontario (Toronto Centre)	2018	2022	
Jeremy Roberts (b. 1991)	Ontario (Ottawa West—Nepean)	2018	2022	
Michael Ford (b. 1994)	Ontario (York South—Weston)	2022	2025	Cabinet Member: Ford ministry 2022-25

==== List of openly LGBTQ party leaders ====
Light purple background : indicates the person was not openly LGBT while in office (entire row) or when first elected (first elected cell)

Light red background : indicates the person served as first minister

Leader	Leadership	In Office		Notes
Leader	Leadership	Start	End	Notes
Richard Hatfield (1931–1991); MLA for Carleton Centre (1961-87)	Leader of the Progressive Conservative Party of New Brunswick; Premier of New Brunswick (1970-87)	June 1969	October 1987	Led party to majority victories in 1970, 1974, 1978, 1982 elections, and to losing every seats in the 1987 election. Never publicly acknowledged being gay during his lifetime. See Prominent provincial office holders known to be LGBTQ
André Boisclair (b. 1966); MNA for Gouin (1989-2004); for Pointe-aux-Trembles (2006-07)	Leader of the Parti Quebecois; Leader of the Opposition of Quebec	November 2005	May 2007	The first openly LGBT person in Canada to lead a party represented in a legislature, led party in the 2007 election to third place defeat; also the first openly LGBTQ person appointed (in 1996) to a cabinet in Canada, cabinet minister in the Bouchard and Landry governments
Allison Brewer (b. 1954) not elected to legislature	Leader of the New Brunswick New Democratic Party	September 2005	November 2006	Led party in 2006 election, won no seat.
Kathleen Wynne (b. 1953); MPP for Don Valley West (2003-22)	Leader of the Ontario Liberal Party; Premier of Ontario	January 2013	June 2018	The first openly LGBTQ first minister in Canada, first out party leader to lead a party to electoral victory (2014), led party to defeat in 2018 election. The first out woman appointed to a cabinet in Canada when appointed to the McGuinty ministry in 2006
Wade MacLauchlan (b. 1954); MLA for York-Oyster Bed (2015-19)	Leader of the Liberal Party of Prince Edward Island Premier of Prince Edward Island	February 2015	May 2019	First openly gay man to become first minister, led party to majority victory in the 2015 election, and to defeat in the 2019 election PEI's first openly LGBTQ MLA (and only to date)
Sylvain Gaudreault (b. 1970); MNA for Jonquière (2007-22)	Interim Leader of the Parti Quebecois; Leader of the Opposition of Quebec	May 2016	October 2016	Cabinet minister in the Marois government
Manon Massé (b. 1963); MNA for Sainte-Marie–Saint-Jacques (since 2014)	Co-spokesperson (co-leader) of the Québec solidaire	May 2017	November 2023	The party's lead candidate in the 2018 election
David Khan (b. 1974) not elected to legislature	Leader of the Alberta Liberal Party	June 2017	November 2020	Led party in the 2019 Alberta election to its worst electoral results in history.
Éric Duhaime (b. 1969); MNA for Bellechasse (2026-)	Leader of the Conservative Party of Quebec	April 2021	incumbent	Led party in 2022 election, the party's vote share increased ninefold to 13% but won no seat.
Charles Milliard (b. 1979); MNA for Orford (2026-)	Leader of the Quebec Liberal Party	February 2026	incumbent	

== Municipal politicians ==
=== Mayors ===
Mayor	City	Term	Notes
Marianne Alto	Victoria, British Columbia	2022–present	
David Bailey	County of Brant, Ontario	2018–present	
Cecil Clarke	Cape Breton Regional Municipality, Nova Scotia	2012–2020; 2024–present	
Eric Duncan	North Dundas, Ontario	2010–2018	
Jeromy Farkas	Calgary, Alberta	2025–present	
Charlotte Gauthier	Gillams, Newfoundland and Labrador	2025–present	Newfoundland's first transgender mayor
Kevin Haché	Caraquet, New Brunswick	2015–2021	
Lisa Helps	Victoria, British Columbia	2014–2022	
Julie Lemieux	Très-Saint-Rédempteur, Quebec	2017–present	First transgender mayor in Canada
Réal Ménard	Mercier–Hochelaga-Maisonneuve, Quebec	2010–2017	
Kevin Morrison	Goderich, Ontario	2014–2018	
Glen Murray	Winnipeg, Manitoba	1998–2004	
Ted Nebbeling	Whistler, British Columbia	1990–1996	
Colin Ratushniak	La Ronge, Saskatchewan	2020–2022	
Maurice Richard	Bécancour, Quebec	1975–1985; 1995–2013	
Luke Strimbold	Burns Lake, British Columbia	2011-2016	
Jim Watson	Ottawa, Ontario	1997–2000; 2010–2022	

=== Municipal councillors ===
Councillor	City	Term	Notes	Ref
Dominic Agostino	Hamilton City Council	1987–1995		
Marianne Alto	Victoria City Council	2018–2022		
Sam Austin	Halifax Regional Council	2016–present	Came out during his 2nd term	
Keenan Aylwin	Barrie City Council	2018–2022		
Carle Bernier-Genest	Montreal City Council	2006–2009		
Raymond Blain	Montreal City Council	1986–1992		
Rebecca Bligh	Vancouver City Council	2018–present		
Evert Botha	Prince Albert City Council	2016–2020		
Paul Butler	Trail, British Columbia	2018–present		
Robin Buxton Potts	Toronto City Council	2022–2022		
Garett Cochrane	Yellowknife City Council	2022–present		
Conner Copeman	Cumberland, British Columbia	2011–present		
Noah Donovan	Quispamsis, New Brunswick	2021–present		
Dakota Ekman	Biggar, Saskatchewan	2020–present		
Stéphane Émard-Chabot	Ottawa City Council	1994–2000		
Jeromy Farkas	Calgary City Council	2017–2021		
Brian Fralic	Region of Queens Municipality, Nova Scotia	2012–present		
Cameron Frye	Tecumseh	1972–1980	Came out at final council meeting in 1980	
Randall Garrison	Esquimalt, British Columbia	2008–2011		
Charlotte Gauthier	Gillams, Newfoundland and Labrador	2020–present	2020-2021 Councilor,2021-2025 Deputy Mayor, 2025-present Mayor	
Joy Guyot	Golden, British Columbia	2022–present		
Paul Harris	Red Deer City Council	2010–2017		
Julien Hénault-Ratelle	Montreal City Council	2021–present		
Alan Herbert	Vancouver City Council	1996–1999		
Darren Hill	Saskatoon City Council	2006–2024		
Aidan Johnson	Hamilton City Council	2014–2018		
Reece Van Breda	Sioux Lookout, Ontario	2022–present		
Helen Kennedy	East York Borough Council	1988–1991		
Cameron Kroetsch	Hamilton City Council	2022–present		
Joy Lachica	Peterborough City Council	2022–present		
Robert Laramée	Montreal City Council	1994–1998; 2001–2005		
Howard Levine	Toronto City Council	1988–1994	Not out during his political career.	
Shawn Lewis	London City Council	2018–present	Deputy mayor 2022–present	
Christopher McCray	Montreal City Council	2025–present		
Cat McGurk	Yellowknife City Council	2022–present		
Catherine McKenney	Ottawa City Council	2014–2022		
Sherry McKibben	Edmonton City Council	1994–1995		
Peter Meiszner	Vancouver City Council	2022–present		
Chris Moise	Toronto City Council	2022–present		
Alex Munter	Kanata City Council; Ottawa-Carleton Regional Council	1991–1994 (Kanata); 1994–2000 (Ottawa-Carleton)		
Michael Phair	Edmonton City Council	1992–2007		
Sarah Potts-Halpin	Victoria City Council	2018–2022		
Jasmin Parker	Saskatoon City Council	2024–Present		
Gordon Price	Vancouver City Council	1986–2002		
Kyle Rae	Toronto City Council	1991–2010		
Ophelia Ravencroft	St. John's City Council	2021–present		
Mark Renaud	Tillsonburg, Ontario	2003–2014		
Richard Ryan	Montreal City Council	2013–2021		
Serge Sasseville	Montreal City Council	2021–present		
Mario Silva	Toronto City Council	1994–2003		
Krista Snow	Halifax City Council	2003–2012		
Tim Stevenson	Vancouver City Council	2002–2018		
Lenore Swystun	Saskatoon City Council	2000–2003		
Donovan Taplin	Wabana, Newfoundland and Labrador	2013–2017		
Ariel Troster	Ottawa City Council	2022–present		
Sonia Williams	Harbour Grace, Newfoundland and Labrador	2013–present		
Alex Wilson	Hamilton City Council	2022–present		
Kristyn Wong-Tam	Toronto City Council	2010–2022		
Ellen Woodsworth	Vancouver City Council	2002–2011		
Russ Wyatt	Winnipeg City Council	2002–2018; 2022–2026		

== Other ==
People who did not hold a political office at the federal, provincial or municipal levels, but have some other form of political significance.

Person	Role	Notes	Ref
Enza Anderson	Candidate for Mayor of Toronto, 2000		
Penny Ballem	City manager of Vancouver, British Columbia, 2008-2015		
Betty Baxter	Federal election candidate for the New Democratic Party, 1993		
Pierre Bourgault	Leader of the Rassemblement pour l'Indépendance Nationale, 1964-1968		
Allison Brewer	Leader of the New Brunswick New Democratic Party, 2005-2006		
Lori Campbell	Federal election candidate for the New Democratic Party, 2019		
Keith Cole	Candidate for Mayor of Toronto, 2010		
Robert Douglas Cook	Sole electoral candidate of the Gay Alliance Toward Equality, 1979		
Ross Dowson	Socialist political candidate		
Jim Egan	Representative for Electoral Area B (Comox North) on the Comox-Strathcona Regional District board, 1981-1993	See also Egan v Canada	
Norman Elder	Candidate for Toronto City Council		
Jamie Lee Hamilton	First known transgender candidate for political office		
Kaj Hasselriis	Candidate for Mayor of Winnipeg, 2006		
Brent Hawkes	Provincial election candidate for the Ontario New Democratic Party, 1995	See also Operation Soap, Metropolitan Community Church of Toronto	
Jamey Heath	New Democratic Party of Canada strategist		
George Hislop	Toronto City Council candidate, 1980	See also We Demand Rally, Operation Soap	
El-Farouk Khaki	Activist, federal election candidate for the New Democratic Party in 2008		
Trevor Kirczenow	Activist, academic, federal election candidate for the Liberal Party of Canada in 2019 and 2021		
David Khan	Leader of the Alberta Liberal Party, 2019-2021		
Khelsilem	First Nations band councillor		
Amita Kuttner	Interim leader of the Green Party of Canada, 2021-2022		
Chris Lea	Leader of the Green Party of Canada, 1990-1996		
John Alan Lee	Federal election candidate for the Cooperative Commonwealth Federation, 1958		
Greg Malone	Federal election candidate for the New Democratic Party, 2000, and the Green Party of Canada, 2019		
Peter Maloney	First known gay candidate for political office		
Christin Milloy	Provincial election candidate for the Ontario Libertarian Party, 2011		
Micheline Montreuil	Federal candidate in 1984 and municipal candidate in 1993		
Brenda Murphy	First out LGBTQ Lieutenant-Governor of a province		
Peg Norman	Two-time federal election candidate for the New Democratic Party		
Jeff Rock	Federal election candidate for the Liberal Party of Canada	See also Metropolitan Community Church of Toronto	
Mary-Woo Sims	Federal election candidate for the New Democratic Party, 2006; Chief commissioner of the British Columbia Human Rights Tribunal, 1996-2001		
Douglas Wilson	Federal election candidate for the New Democratic Party		
