= List of the first openly LGBTQ holders of political offices in Canada =

The following is a list of the first openly LGBT (lesbian, gay, bisexual or transgender) holders of elected or appointed political office in Canada.

LGBT people have served at all three main levels of political office in Canada: municipal, provincial and federal. As of 2022, every Canadian province and territory has been represented by at least one out LGBTQ officeholder.

In addition to the milestones noted below, Canada has also had a number of prominent politicians who were not out as LGBT during their careers in politics, either coming out after they retired or being officially outed only in posthumous biographical sources, as well as openly LGBT politicians whose election or appointment to office was not a historically significant first as other LGBT people had already held the same office before them. For a more thorough list of Canadian LGBTQ politicians regardless of whether they represented historic firsts or not, see also List of LGBT politicians in Canada.

== First overall ==
- First openly gay political candidate, regardless of electoral status: Peter Maloney ran for a seat on the Toronto Board of Education in the 1972 Toronto municipal election as an openly gay candidate. (He had previously been an Ontario Liberal Party candidate in St. George in the 1971 Ontario provincial election, and some later biographical sources have stated that he ran as an openly gay candidate at that time as well, but no indication of his sexuality is seen in any media coverage of the 1971 election. The first known coverage of Maloney which makes any reference to his sexuality is of a party policy conference in early 1972, several months after the election was over.) Robert Douglas Cook, a Gay Alliance Toward Equality candidate for the electoral district of West Vancouver-Howe Sound in the 1979 British Columbia provincial election, has been credited with this distinction by some media outlets, but was in fact merely the first to run as a candidate of an explicitly gay-identified political organization rather than a traditional political party or for a non-partisan office.
- First transgender candidate, regardless of electoral status: Jamie Lee Hamilton ran for Vancouver's Park Board in 1996. Christin Milloy, an Ontario Libertarian Party candidate in the 2011 provincial election in Ontario, was the first transgender candidate in a provincial election. Jennifer McCreath, a Strength in Democracy candidate in Avalon in the 2015 federal election, was the first transgender candidate in a federal election. Trevor Kirczenow was Liberal candidate in Provencher in the 2019 federal election, becoming the first openly transgender candidate nominated by a major party in a federal election.
- First openly gay person elected to office: Raymond Blain (Montreal City Council, 1986) is commonly credited with this distinction, although Maurice Richard, who was elected to the National Assembly of Quebec in 1985 after coming out as gay sometime during his term as mayor of Bécancour, Quebec from 1976 to 1985, predated him and the story was simply not picked up by national media until later on. Out lesbian Sue Harris won election to the Vancouver Park Board in 1984. Jim Egan (Comox-Strathcona Regional District board, 1981) may also have predated all of them, although sources are unclear on whether he ran as an openly gay candidate at the time.
- First transgender person elected to office: Julie Lemieux was elected to the municipal council of Très-Saint-Rédempteur in the 2013 municipal election, and later ran for and won the mayoralty of the village in the subsequent 2017 municipal election. Although reported as a lesbian-identified woman at the time of their election to the Legislative Assembly of Alberta in 2015, Estefan Cortes-Vargas came out as non-binary in an assembly debate later in the year.

== Federal ==
=== Parliament ===
- Member of Parliament:
  - Male: Svend Robinson, MP (NDP) – elected 1979 [Came out: 1988]
  - Female: Libby Davies, MP (NDP) – elected 1997 [Came out: 2001]
- Two-spirit: Blake Desjarlais, MP (NDP) – elected 2021
- Senator:
  - Male: Laurier LaPierre – 2001
  - Female: Nancy Ruth – 2005

At least two federal MPs who predated Robinson, Heward Grafftey and Charles Lapointe, and one who was first elected alongside him in 1979, Ian Waddell, are known to have come out as gay or bisexual after their retirement from politics.

==== By provincial delegation ====
As of 2024, seven of Canada's ten provinces have elected at least one LGBT MP to the House of Commons or had an LGBT senator appointed from their province.

- British Columbia
  - Male: Svend Robinson, MP (NDP) – elected 1979 [Came out: 1988]
  - Female: Libby Davies, MP (NDP) – elected 1997 [Came out: 2001]
  - Already out at first election: Bill Siksay, MP (NDP) – 2004
- Nova Scotia
  - Scott Brison, MP (Progressive Conservative, later Liberal) – elected 1997 [Came out: 2002]
- Ontario
  - Mario Silva, MP (Liberal) – 2004
  - Senator Nancy Ruth (Progressive Conservative, later Conservative) – 2005
- Quebec
  - Senator Laurier LaPierre (Liberal) – 2001
  - Réal Ménard, MP (Bloc Québécois) – elected 1993 [Came out: 1994]
- Saskatchewan
  - Sheri Benson, MP (NDP) – 2015
- Alberta
  - Randy Boissonnault, MP (Liberal) – 2015
  - Two-spirit: Blake Desjarlais, MP (NDP) – elected 2021
  - Senator Kristopher Wells - appointed 2024
- Newfoundland and Labrador
  - Seamus O'Regan, MP (Liberal) – 2015

=== Cabinet ===
- Federal cabinet minister:
  - Male: Scott Brison, 2004
  - Female: Pascale St-Onge, 2021

=== Parties ===
- Leader of a federal political party: Chris Lea (Green) – 1990
- Deputy leader of a federal political party represented in Parliament: Libby Davies (NDP) – 2007

== Provincial and territorial ==
As of 2024, every Canadian province and territory has elected at least one out LGBTQ member to its provincial or territorial legislature.

The provinces of British Columbia, Alberta, Manitoba, Ontario, Nova Scotia and Quebec and the territory of Yukon have had more than one LGBT member, and all have had both gay men and lesbian women serve in the legislatures. The other provinces and territories have had only one each to date. Alberta, Manitoba, Nova Scotia, Ontario, and Yukon have also had elected MLAs who identified as non-binary.

Some figures, including Ian Scott, Keith Norton, Phil Gillies, Dave Cooke and Dominic Agostino in Ontario, Claude Charron and Guy Joron in Quebec, Andrew Thomson in Saskatchewan and Richard Hatfield in New Brunswick, predated the firsts listed here but were not out to the general public during their time in politics.

To date, most LGBT people who have served in provincial or territorial legislatures have represented urban districts in larger cities, while very few have ever served in a purely rural district.

- Lieutenant Governor
  - Brenda Murphy (New Brunswick) – 2019
- Provincial Premier
  - Female: Kathleen Wynne (Ontario) – 2013 (First female premier of Ontario, first openly LGBT premier in Canada)
  - Male: Wade MacLauchlan (Prince Edward Island) – 2015
  - One provincial premier, Richard Hatfield in New Brunswick, predated Wynne but was not out as gay during his political career, instead being outed only after his death.
- Provincial Deputy Premier
  - Male: George Smitherman (Ontario) (Liberal) – 2006
  - Genderqueer: Uzoma Asagwara Manitoba NDP - 2023
- Provincial cabinet minister:
  - British Columbia – Tim Stevenson – 2000
  - Quebec – André Boisclair – 2002
  - Ontario – George Smitherman – 2003
  - Manitoba – Jim Rondeau – 2004
  - Nova Scotia – Joanne Bernard – 2013
  - Alberta – Ricardo Miranda – 2016
- Leader of a provincial party: Allison Brewer (New Brunswick New Democratic Party) – 2005
- Leader of a provincial party with seats in a legislature: André Boisclair (Parti Québécois) – 2005
- Provincial and territorial legislators:
  - British Columbia
    - Male: Mike Farnworth, 1991 (came out during leadership run in 2010); Ted Nebbeling and Tim Stevenson, 1996 (both out when elected)
    - Female: Jenn McGinn, 2008
  - Alberta
    - Male: Michael Connolly and Ricardo Miranda, 2015
    - Genderqueer: Estefan Cortes-Vargas, 2015 Cortes-Vargas publicly identified as a lesbian woman at the time of their election to the legislature, and came out as non-binary during a debate in the legislature later in the year.
    - Female: Janis Irwin, 2019
    - Two-spirit: Brooks Arcand-Paul, 2023
  - Manitoba
    - Male: Jim Rondeau, 1999
    - Female: Jennifer Howard, 2007
    - Genderqueer: Uzoma Asagwara, 2019
  - Ontario
    - Male: George Smitherman, (Liberal)
    - Female: Kathleen Wynne, MPP 2003 (Liberal)
    - Non-binary: Kristyn Wong-Tam, MPP 2022 (NDP)
    - Bisexual: Suze Morrison, MLA (NDP) elected 2018, came out 2021
  - Quebec
    - Male: Maurice Richard and André Boulerice, 1985
    - Female: Agnès Maltais, 2003 (came out)
  - Newfoundland and Labrador: Gerry Rogers, 2011
  - Nova Scotia
    - Male: Rod Wilson, 2024
      - Note: Although Wilson was the first openly gay man elected, Cecil Clarke previously served from 2001 to 2011 in the Nova Scotia House of Assembly, but was not out at that time and came out during his later stint as a mayor.
    - Female: Joanne Bernard, 2013
    - Genderqueer: Lisa Lachance, 2021 (NDP)
  - Prince Edward Island: Wade MacLauchlan, 2015
  - Saskatchewan
    - Nathaniel Teed, 2022
  - Yukon
    - Male: Dale Eftoda, 2001
    - Non-binary: Lane Tredger, 2021
  - Northwest Territories: Julie Green, 2015
  - Nunavut: Janet Brewster, elected 2021, came out 2022
  - New Brunswick: Luke Randall, 2024
    - Note: Although Randall was the first out LGBTQ person elected to the assembly, Richard Hatfield previously served from 1961 to 1987, but was not openly gay during his political career and was outed only after his death.

== Municipal ==
=== Overall firsts ===
==== Mayors ====
- Mayor of any municipality: Maurice Richard served as mayor of Bécancour, Quebec from 1975 to 1985. Contemporary biographical sources indicate that he came out as gay sometime during his mayoralty, but are not clear about when; it is known, however, that he was out as gay by the time of his campaign for election to the National Assembly of Quebec in 1985. After serving in the provincial legislature from 1985 to 1994 as its first openly LGBT member, he was reelected to another stint as mayor of Bécancour in 1995.
- Mayor of a major city: Glen Murray (Winnipeg) – 1998 (credited as first openly gay major of a major city in North America)
- Transgender mayor: Julie Lemieux was elected mayor of Très-Saint-Rédempteur in the 2017 municipal election.

One mayor, Charlotte Whitton in Ottawa (1951–56, 1961–64), has been the subject of unresolved debate about her sexual orientation. Whitton spent much of her adult life in a Boston marriage-style living arrangement with another woman, Margaret Grier; in 1999, 24 years after Whitton's death, the National Archives of Canada publicly released many intimate personal letters between Whitton and Grier. The release of these papers sparked much debate in the Canadian media about whether Whitton and Grier's relationship could be characterized as lesbian, or merely as an emotionally intimate friendship between two unmarried women. Whitton never publicly identified herself as lesbian during her lifetime, and thus could not be considered Canada's first out LGBT mayor regardless of the status of her relationship with Grier.

==== City councillors ====
- First city councillor: At the last caretaker meeting of Tecumseh, Ontario's municipal council following the 1980 municipal elections, outgoing councillor and unsuccessful mayoral candidate Cameron Frye acknowledged that he was gay. The campaign had been marked by rumours about Frye's sexuality, including the distribution of hate literature claiming that Frye would promote a "gay lifestyle" as mayor and would lead the town into "moral decay", although Frye refused to confirm or deny the claims about his sexuality during the campaign. Frye was first elected to the municipal council in 1972.
- First city councillor already out at first election: Raymond Blain (Montreal), 1986

==== School Board Trustee ====
- First trans school board trustee: Lyra Evans was elected in October 2018.

=== By province ===
==== Alberta ====
- City councillor in Edmonton:
  - Male: Michael Phair – 1992
  - Female: Sherry McKibben – 1994
- City councillor in Red Deer: Paul Harris – 2010
- Mayor and city councillor in Calgary: Jeromy Farkas – 2025, 2017

==== British Columbia ====
- City councillor in Trail: Paul Butler – 2018 to present
- Town councillor in Golden: Joy Guyot – 2022 to present
- City councillor in Vancouver:
  - Male: Gordon Price – 1986 to 2002
  - Female: Ellen Woodsworth – 2002
  - Genderqueer: Solomon Yi-Kieran – 2026
- City councillor in Esquimalt: Randall Garrison – 2008
- City councillor in Cumberland: Conner Copeman – 2011
- Mayor of Victoria: Lisa Helps – 2014 to 2022
- Mayor of Whistler: Ted Nebbeling – 1990 to 1996

==== Manitoba ====
- City councillor in Winnipeg: Glen Murray – 1989

==== New Brunswick ====
- Mayor of Caraquet: Kevin Haché – 2012
- Municipal councillor in City of Miramichi: Adam Lordon - 2015

==== Newfoundland and Labrador ====
- Deputy mayor in Harbour Grace, Newfoundland and Labrador: Sonia Williams – 2013
- Municipal councillor in Wabana, Bell Island: Donovan Taplin – 2013.
- Transgender municipal councillor: Charlotte Gauthier, Gillams – 2020

==== Nova Scotia ====
- City councillor in Halifax: Krista Snow – 2003
- Municipal Councillor in Region of Queens: Brian Fralic – 2012
- Mayor of Cape Breton Regional Municipality: Cecil Clarke – elected 2012 [Came out: 2018]

==== Ontario ====
- Barrie: Keenan Aylwin – city councillor, elected 2018
- Brant: David Bailey – mayor, elected 2018
- Fort Frances: Douglas Judson – town councillor, elected 2018
- Goderich: Kevin Morrison – mayor, elected 2014
- Guelph: Erin Caton, nonbinary City Councillor Ward 1, elected 2022
- Hamilton: Aidan Johnson – city councillor, elected 2014
- London: Shawn Lewis - city councillor, elected 2018
- North Dundas: Eric Duncan – mayor; elected 2010, came out 2017
- Ottawa:
  - Male: Alex Munter – Kanata city councillor, elected 1991, came out 1993; Stéphane Émard-Chabot – Ottawa city councillor, elected 1994
  - Non-Binary: Catherine McKenney – city councillor, elected 2014
  - Mayor: Jim Watson – elected 2010, came out 2019
- Sioux Lookout: Reece Van Breda - town councillor, elected 2022
- Tillsonburg: Mark Renaud – city councillor, elected 2003
- Toronto:
  - Male: Kyle Rae – city councillor, elected 1991
  - Female: Kristyn Wong-Tam – city councillor, elected 2010 (Note: Wong-Tam later came out as non-binary after moving to provincial politics, but identified as a lesbian woman throughout their municipal career.)
  - Howard Levine, who was first elected to Toronto City Council in 1988, technically preceded Rae, but did not publicly identify himself as gay at the time.

==== Quebec ====
- City councillor in Montreal:
  - Male: Raymond Blain – 1986

==== Saskatchewan ====
- City councillor in Prince Albert:
  - Male: Evert Botha – 2016
- City councillor in Saskatoon:
  - Male: Darren Hill – 2006
  - Female: Lenore Swystun – 2000
- Mayor of La Ronge: Colin Ratushniak – 2020
- Town councillor in Biggar: Dakota Ekman – 2020

== See also ==
- List of lesbian, gay, bisexual, or transgender firsts by year
- List of non-binary political office-holders
- List of the first LGBT holders of political offices
- List of the first LGBT holders of political offices in the United States
- List of the first LGBT holders of political offices in the United Kingdom
