= Martin Lemay =

Canadian politician (born 1964)

MNA for Sainte-Marie–Saint-Jacques
- In office April 10, 2006 – 2012
- Preceded by: André Boulerice
- Succeeded by: Daniel Breton

Personal details
- Born: March 19, 1964 (age 62) Amos, Quebec
- Party: Parti Québécois
- Portfolio: Immigration, cultural communities, Citizenship, Metropole

Martin Lemay (born March 19, 1964, in Amos, Quebec) is a Canadian politician in Quebec. He is the Parti Québécois (PQ) Member of the National Assembly (MNA) for Sainte-Marie–Saint-Jacques in the National Assembly of Quebec.

== Background ==
He studied history and sociology at the Université du Québec à Montréal. He also received a post graduate certificate in public management at the École nationale d'administration publique.

== Montreal city politics ==
Lemay began his political career in municipal politics being a councilor for the district of Sainte-Marie in the Montreal region from 1994 to 1998. In 2000, he was president of the Ville-Marie borough. When Pierre Bourque tried to be elected MNA for the Action démocratique du Québec (ADQ), he became leader of Vision Montréal, which was then the Official Opposition party against Gérald Tremblay.

== Member of the legislature ==
In April 2006, he was elected in Sainte-Marie–Saint-Jacques, the former stronghold of Claude Charron and André Boulerice, in a by-election, defeating the Liberal candidate Nathalie Malépart, who was the daughter of former MNA Jean-Claude Malépart.

This was the first election in which the Québec Solidaire party took part. Lemay had received the support of the SPQ Libre of Pierre Dubuc.

At the time of his assembly nomination, Lemay asked Jean Charest to legislate on climate change, trying to benefit from the recent resignation of Thomas Mulcair. He was named spokesperson on Housing, replacing Nicole Léger.

After his 2007 re-election, he was named the PQ critic for Immigration and Cultural Communities.

== See also ==
- Vision Montreal Crisis, 1997

== Electoral record (partial) ==
Quebec provincial by-election, April 10, 2006: Sainte-Marie–Saint-Jacques
Party	Candidate	Votes	%	±%
Parti Québécois	Martin Lemay	5,462	41.21	-8.63
Liberal	Nathalie Malépart	3,700	27.91	-2.56
Québec solidaire	Manon Massé	2,943	22.20	+15.72*
Green	Jean-Christophe Mortreux	815	6.15	+3.52
Action démocratique	Catherine Goyer	257	1.94	−6.39
Independent	Jocelyne Leduc	50	0.38	–
Independent	Régent Millette	28	0.21	–
Total valid votes		13,255	99.24	–
Total rejected ballots		101	0.76	–
Turnout		13,356	31.47	-30.04
Electors on the lists		42,437	–	–
Parti Québécois hold		Swing		-3.04
* Quebec solidaire vote is compared to the UFP vote in the 2003 election.
