= Malépart =

Malépart is a surname. Notable people with the surname include:

- Germaine Malépart (1898–1963), Canadian pianist and music educator
- Jean-Claude Malépart (1938–1989), French Canadian politician
- Nathalie Malépart (born c. 1973), Canadian politician
