= Daniel Breton =

Canadian politician

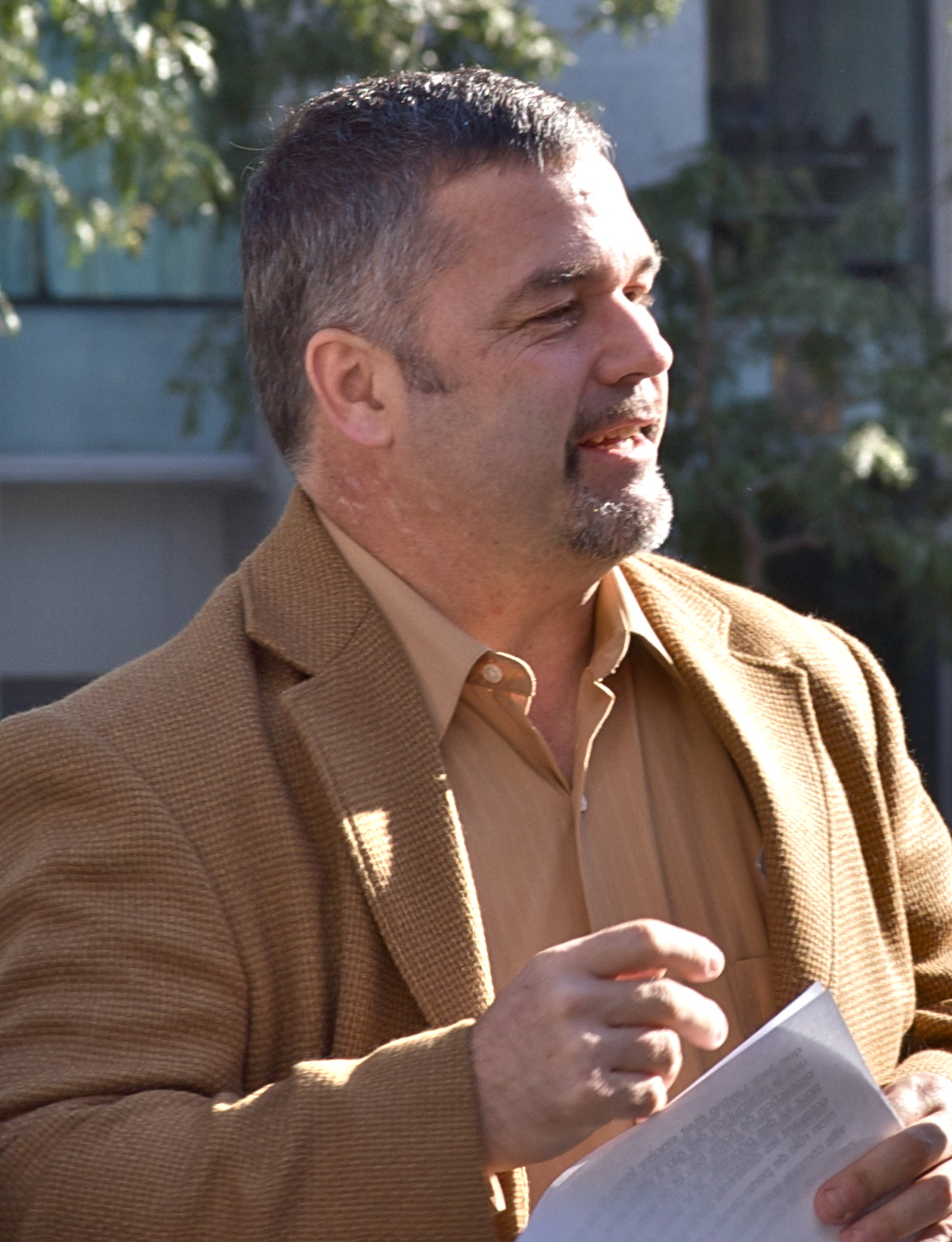
- Daniel Breton in 2008

MNA for Sainte-Marie–Saint-Jacques
- In office September 4, 2012 – April 7, 2014
- Preceded by: Martin Lemay
- Succeeded by: Manon Massé

Minister of Sustainable Development, Environment, Wildlife and Parks
- In office September 19 – November 29, 2012
- Preceded by: Pierre Arcand
- Succeeded by: Yves-François Blanchet

Personal details
- Born: June 18, 1962 (age 63) Montreal, Quebec
- Party: Parti Québécois

Daniel Breton (born June 18, 1962) is an environmental activist and politician in the Canadian province of Quebec. He was the member of the National Assembly of Quebec for the riding of Sainte-Marie—Saint-Jacques between 2012 and 2014.

== Early life and activism ==
Breton was born in Montreal and studied political science at the University of Montreal and the University of Quebec at Montreal. He was a principal organizer of a November 2001 march in Montreal against Canada's military intervention in Afghanistan. During the march, he was quoted as saying, "We held this demonstration because we are against a military solution to settle the conflict and the fight against terrorism. We are against terrorism, but war is not the solution."

Breton subsequently founded Québec-Vert-Kyoto (later known as QuébecKyoto), which advocated in favour of the Kyoto Accord on climate change. In 2004, he led an ultimately successful protest against Hydro-Quebec's plans to launch the Suroit natural gas power project near Beauharnois. The following year, he called for the Montreal Transit Corporation to invest in suburban commuter trains rather than building a new bridge between Laval and Montreal.

In June 2007, Breton called on Canadian environment minister John Baird to resign over the Stephen Harper government's handling of the Kyoto Accord. Breton described Baird as "neither competent nor willing to carry in a serious, non-partisan manner, the heavy burden of the environment portfolio."

Breton spoke against Quebec's plans for shale gas exploration in 2010.

On November 29, 2012, Daniel Breton resigned from his post as environment minister less than two months after taking office. He was an unsuccessful candidate during the 2018 election.

== Political activism ==
Breton helped re-launch the dormant Green Party of Quebec for the 2003 Quebec general election and was the party's candidate in Hochelaga-Maisonneuve. He finished sixth against Parti Québécois incumbent Louise Harel. Breton also worked for the Green Party of Canada. He supported the sovereigntist option in the 1995 Quebec referendum on sovereignty and signed a joint statement in favour of Quebec independence in 2007.

In 2008, Breton left the Green Party to join the Canadian New Democratic Party (NDP). In joining the NDP, he was quoted as saying, "what is at stake in 2008 is not the sovereignty of Quebec but the sovereignty of Canada. We are in the process of losing control over our natural resources, over our economy, of our big businesses and our political sovereignty." He ran as a star candidate for the party in the 2008 federal election and finished third in Jeanne-Le Ber. He was not a candidate in the 2011 federal election, in which the NDP made a historic breakthrough to become the dominant federal party in Quebec.

In 2012, Breton joined the Parti Québécois and ran successfully for the party in the 2012 election, retaining the riding of Sainte-Marie–Saint-Jacques for the PQ. He was the minister of Sustainable Development, Environment, Wildlife and Parks from September 19 to November 29, 2012 in the government of Pauline Marois. He was defeated in the 2014 election by Manon Massé of Québec Solidaire.

== Electoral record ==
2014 Quebec general election
Party	Candidate	Votes	%	±%
Québec solidaire	Manon Massé	8,437	30.60	+5.17
Liberal	Anna Klisko	8,346	30.27	+10.96
Parti Québécois	Daniel Breton	7,612	27.61	-8.07
Coalition Avenir Québec	Patrick Thauvette	2,364	8.57	-6.21
Green	Stewart Wiseman	393	1.43	–
Option nationale	Nic Payne	210	0.76	-2.33
Bloc Pot	Marc Bissonnette	164	0.59	–
Marxist–Leninist	Serge Lachapelle	47	0.17	-0.04
Total valid votes		27,573	98.86	–
Total rejected ballots		318	1.14	–
Turnout		27,891	65.96	-2.22
Electors on the lists		42,287	–	–
Québec solidaire gain from Parti Québécois		Swing		

2012 Quebec general election
Party	Candidate	Votes	%	±%
Parti Québécois	Daniel Breton	10,199	35.76	-10.86
Québec solidaire	Manon Massé	7,253	25.43	+10.03
Liberal	Étienne Collins	5,531	19.39	-8.83
Coalition Avenir Québec	Cédrick Beauregard	4,216	14.78	+10.76*
Option nationale	Denis Monière	880	3.09	–
Middle Class	Louis Provencher	143	0.50	–
Independent	Jean-Marc Labrèche	123	0.43	–
Quebec Citizens' Union	Edson Emilio	87	0.31	–
Marxist–Leninist	Serge Lachapelle	60	0.21	-0.17
Independent	Dimitri Mourkes	31	0.11	–
Total valid votes		28,523	98.94	–
Total rejected ballots		305	1.06	–
Turnout		28,828	68.18	+20.94
Electors on the lists		42,283	–	–

* Result compared to Action démocratique

2008 Canadian federal election: Jeanne-Le Ber
Party	Candidate	Votes	%	±%	Expenditures
Bloc Québécois	Thierry St-Cyr	17,144	34.91		$88,605
Liberal	Christian P. Feuillette	15,841	32.26	–	$58,773
New Democratic	Daniel Breton	7,708	15.70		$28,413
Conservative	Daniel Beaudin	5,494	11.19		$25,712
Green	Véronik Sansoucy	2,345	4.78	–	$353
Independent	Darryl Gray	577	1.17		
Total valid votes		49,109	100.00		
Total rejected ballots		595			
Turnout		49,704	57.66		
Electors on the lists		86,201			
Sources: Official Results, Elections Canada and Financial Returns, Elections Canada.

2003 Quebec general election: Hochelaga-Maisonneuve
Party	Candidate	Votes	%	±%
Parti Québécois	Louise Harel	13,138	55.77	−4.84
Liberal	Richer Dompierre	6,210	26.36	+0.83
Action démocratique	Louise Blackburn	2,449	10.40	−1.11
UFP	Lise Alarie	788	3.34	–
Bloc Pot	Alex Néron	476	2.02	–
Green	Daniel Breton	367	1.56	–
Marxist–Leninist	Christine Dandenault	79	0.34	−0.28
Christian Democracy	Mario Richard	52	0.22	–
Total valid votes		23,559	98.40	–
Total rejected ballots		383	1.60	–
Turnout		23,942	60.09	−7.92
Electors on the lists		39,843	–	–
Source: Official Results, Le Directeur général des élections du Québec.
