= Manon Massé =

Canadian politician (born 1963)

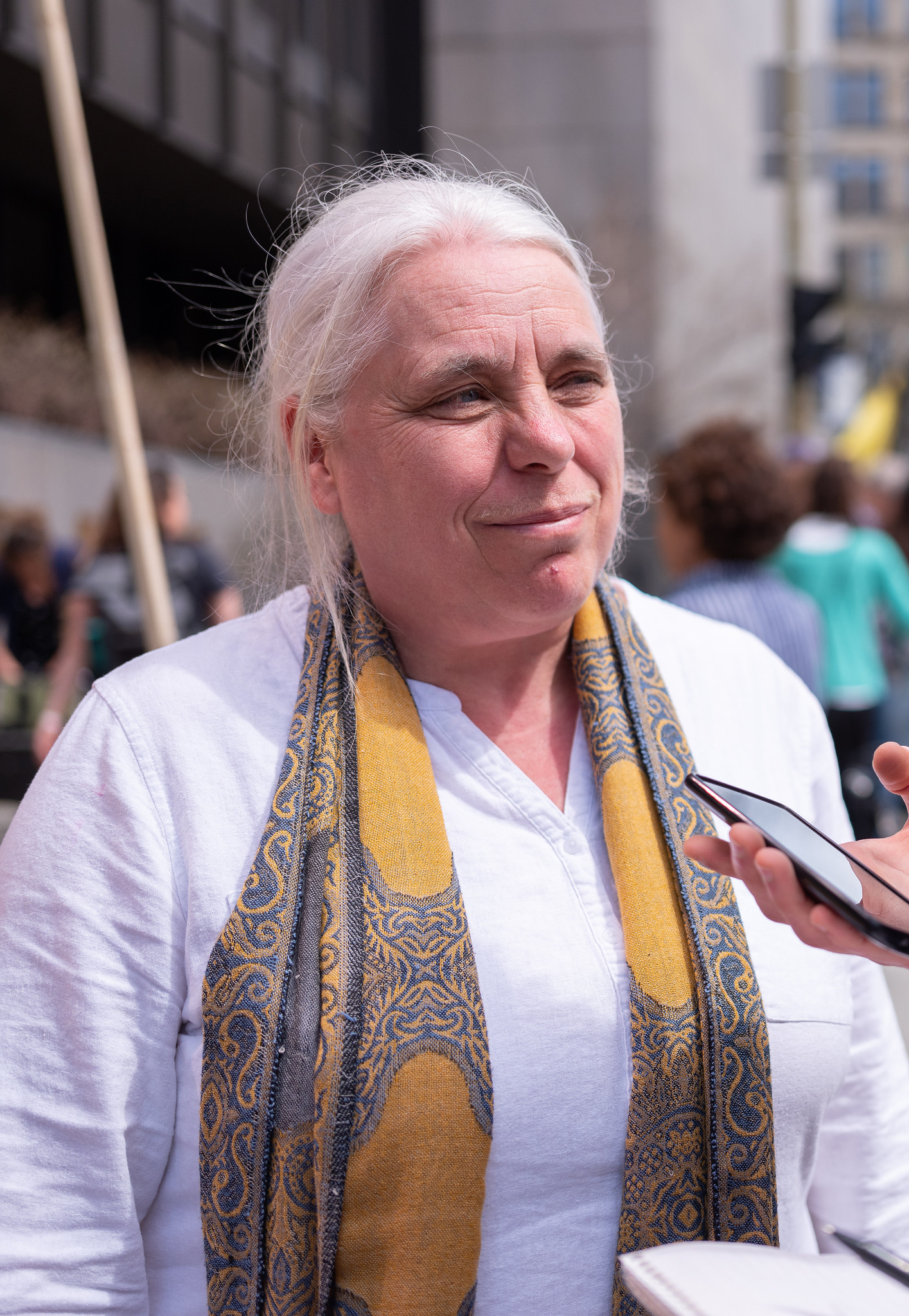
- Massé in 2019

Co-spokesperson for Québec solidaire
- In office 21 May 2017 – 26 November 2023 Serving with Gabriel Nadeau-Dubois
- Preceded by: Françoise David
- Succeeded by: Émilise Lessard-Therrien

Member of the National Assembly for Sainte-Marie–Saint-Jacques
- In office 7 April 2014 – 27 August 2026
- Preceded by: Daniel Breton
- Succeeded by: Roxane Milot

Personal details
- Born: 22 May 1963 (age 63) Windsor, Quebec, Canada
- Party: Québec solidaire
- Education: Université de Montréal

Manon Massé (born 22 May 1963) is a Canadian politician in Quebec and was one of the co-spokespersons for Québec solidaire from 2017 to 2023. She represented Sainte-Marie–Saint-Jacques in the National Assembly of Quebec from 2014 to 2026. Before her time in political office, she was a community organizer and one of the co-founders for the political movement Option citoyenne.

== Biography ==
Massé was born on 22 May 1963 in Windsor, Quebec, to Fernande Migneault and Gilles Massé, both factory workers by profession. She spent the first seven years of her childhood in Windsor until her family moved to Boucherville, a suburb of Montreal.

She studied at Cégep Édouard-Montpetit before pursuing a major in theology at the Université de Montréal.

Massé worked with various community organisations, social causes, and political movements, including the Comité social Centre-Sud and Fédération des femmes du Québec (trans. Women's Federation of Québec). She was also on the coordinating committees for the Marche mondiale des Femmes in 2000 and the Marche du pain et des roses in 1995. In 2011, she was also part of the Freedom Flotilla II, representing Québec solidaire on the Canadian Boat for Gaza, Tahrir.

== Political career ==
Manon Massé was the first-ever candidate to stand for political office under the Québec Solidaire banner, doing so in the 2006 by-election for the Sainte-Marie–Saint-Jacques constituency she now represents. She received 22% of the vote.

She was elected to the National Assembly of Quebec in the 2014 election, her fifth attempt and winning the party its third seat.

Due to her narrow margin of victory over Quebec Liberal Party candidate Anna Klisko of 91 votes, a request for a judicial recount was filed by Klisko. The request was rejected by the presiding judge on 11 April, on the grounds that Klisko did not have sufficient evidence of any irregularities in the election process.

=== Québec solidaire co-spokesperson, 2017–2023 ===
Massé, along with activist Gabriel Nadeau-Dubois, was elected co-spokesperson for Québec solidaire at the party's conference in May 2017. This is a continuation the party's tradition of allocating the role to a woman and a man to serve concurrently.

In her role, Massé was proposed by the party as their candidate for Premier of Quebec in the 2018 Quebec general election. In this election, the party tripled its seat count from three members to ten, the party's best performance to date and bringing the party to third party status, ahead of the traditional major sovereigntist party, Parti Québécois.

In the trial of Catalonia independence leaders, Massé testified at the Supreme Court of Spain on 29 April 2019 due to her role as international observer in the 2017 Catalan independence referendum.

Following the 2022 provincial election, she was chosen to lead the issues of Relations with First Nations and Inuit, Social Services for people living with an intellectual disability or autism spectrum disorder, Social Solidarity and Community Action, Homelessness, and LGBTQ+ community issues.

In May 2023, Massé announced that she was stepping down from her co-spokesperson role. In November 2023, she was succeeded as co-spokesperson by Émilise Lessard-Therrien. She did not seek re-election in the 2026 general election.

== Electoral history ==
2022 Quebec general election: Sainte-Marie-Saint-Jacques
Party	Candidate	Votes	%	±%
Québec solidaire	Manon Massé	10,892	47.69	-1.59
Liberal	Christopher Baenninger	3,621	15.85	-5.30
Parti Québécois	Phoeby Laplante	3,362	14.72	+0.73
Coalition Avenir Québec	Aurélie Diep	3,268	14.31	+3.32
Conservative	Stefan Marquis	1,138	4.98	+4.46
Green	Hailey Roop	450	1.97	-1.52
Marxist–Leninist	Linda Sullivan	64	0.28	–
Climat Québec	Jency Mercier	46	0.20	–
Total valid votes		22,841	99.11	–
Total rejected ballots		205	0.89	-0.15
Turnout		23,046	56.23	-3.19
Electors on the lists		40,988	–	–

2018 Quebec general election: Sainte-Marie-Saint-Jacques
Party	Candidate	Votes	%	±%
Québec solidaire	Manon Massé	12,429	49.28	+18.68
Liberal	Louis Charron	5,335	21.15	-9.12
Parti Québécois	Jennifer Drouin	3,528	13.99	-13.62
Coalition Avenir Québec	Anna Klisko	2,773	10.99	+2.42
Green	Anna Calderon	881	3.49	+1.43
Conservative	Don Ivanski	130	0.52	–
Bloc Pot	Henri Ladouceur	73	0.29	-0.30
Citoyens au pouvoir	Alexis Cossette-Trudel	72	0.29	–
Total valid votes		25,221	98.96	
Total rejected ballots		266	1.04	
Turnout		25,487	59.42	-6.54
Eligible voters		42,894		
Québec solidaire hold		Swing		+13.90
Source(s) "Rapport des résultats officiels du scrutin". Élections Québec.

2014 Quebec general election: Sainte-Marie–Saint-Jacques
Party	Candidate	Votes	%	±%
Québec solidaire	Manon Massé	8,437	30.60	+5.17
Liberal	Anna Klisko	8,346	30.27	+10.96
Parti Québécois	Daniel Breton	7,612	27.61	-8.07
Coalition Avenir Québec	Patrick Thauvette	2,364	8.57	-6.21
Green	Stewart Wiseman	393	1.43	–
Option nationale	Nic Payne	210	0.76	-2.33
Bloc Pot	Marc Bissonnette	164	0.59	–
Marxist–Leninist	Serge Lachapelle	47	0.17	-0.04
Total valid votes		27,573	98.86	–
Total rejected ballots		318	1.14	–
Turnout		27,891	65.96	-2.22
Electors on the lists		42,287	–	–
Québec solidaire gain from Parti Québécois		Swing		

2012 Quebec general election
Party	Candidate	Votes	%	±%
Parti Québécois	Daniel Breton	10,199	35.76	-10.86
Québec solidaire	Manon Massé	7,253	25.43	+10.03
Liberal	Étienne Collins	5,531	19.39	-8.83
Coalition Avenir Québec	Cédrick Beauregard	4,216	14.78	+10.76*
Option nationale	Denis Monière	880	3.09	–
Middle Class	Louis Provencher	143	0.50	–
Independent	Jean-Marc Labrèche	123	0.43	–
Quebec Citizens' Union	Edson Emilio	87	0.31	–
Marxist–Leninist	Serge Lachapelle	60	0.21	-0.17
Independent	Dimitri Mourkes	31	0.11	–
Total valid votes		28,523	98.94	–
Total rejected ballots		305	1.06	–
Turnout		28,828	68.18	+20.94
Electors on the lists		42,283	–	–
Parti Québécois hold		Swing		-10.45
* Coalition avenir vote is compared to the Action démocratique vote in the 2008 election.

2008 Quebec general election
Party	Candidate	Votes	%	±%
Parti Québécois	Martin Lemay	9,236	46.62	+5.28
Liberal	Éric Prud'homme	5,590	28.22	+4.52
Québec solidaire	Manon Massé	3,051	15.40	+1.24
Green	Annie Morel	1,062	5.36	-4.32
Action démocratique	Dominic Boisvert	796	4.02	-6.74
Marxist–Leninist	Serge Lachapelle	76	0.38	+0.02
Total valid votes		19,811	98.60	–
Total rejected ballots		282	1.40	–
Turnout		20,093	47.24	-13.62
Electors on the lists		42,530	–	–

2007 Quebec general election
Party	Candidate	Votes	%	±%
Parti Québécois	Martin Lemay	10,501	41.34	+0.13
Liberal	Denise Dussault	6,021	23.70	-4.21
Québec solidaire	Manon Massé	3,596	14.16	-8.04
Action démocratique	Jean-Stéphane Dupervil	2,733	10.76	+8.82
Green	Corinne Ardon	2,460	9.68	+3.53
Marxist–Leninist	Serge Lachapelle	92	0.36	–
Total valid votes		25,403	99.02	–
Total rejected ballots		251	0.98	–
Turnout		25,654	60.86	+29.39
Electors on the lists		42,150	–	–

Quebec provincial by-election, April 10, 2006: Sainte-Marie–Saint-Jacques
Party	Candidate	Votes	%	±%
Parti Québécois	Martin Lemay	5,462	41.21	-8.63
Liberal	Nathalie Malépart	3,700	27.91	-2.56
Québec solidaire	Manon Massé	2,943	22.20	+15.72*
Green	Jean-Christophe Mortreux	815	6.15	+3.52
Action démocratique	Catherine Goyer	257	1.94	−6.39
Independent	Jocelyne Leduc	50	0.38	–
Independent	Régent Millette	28	0.21	–
Total valid votes		13,255	99.24	–
Total rejected ballots		101	0.76	–
Turnout		13,356	31.47	-30.04
Electors on the lists		42,437	–	–
Parti Québécois hold		Swing		-3.04
* Quebec solidaire vote is compared to the UFP vote in the 2003 election.

== Personal life ==
Manon Massé is a prominent feminist and social justice advocate in Québec. She shares her life with her partner, Ghislaine Goulet.
