= Nathalie Malépart =

Canadian politician (born c. 1973)

Nathalie Malépart (born c. 1973) is a Canadian politician. She was a City Councillor in Montreal, Quebec.

== Background ==
She was born in Montreal about 1973 and was the daughter of politician Jean-Claude Malépart, who was Liberal Member of the House of Commons from 1979 to 1989.

== City Councillor ==
She was elected to the City Council as a Vision Montreal candidate in 1994 in the district of Maisonneuve. She crossed the floor to sit as an independent in 1997 and did not run for re-election in 1998.

== Provincial Politics ==
Malépart ran as the Liberal candidate in a 2006 by-election in the riding of Sainte-Marie–Saint-Jacques, but was defeated by former colleague Martin Lemay.

== Electoral record (partial) ==
Quebec provincial by-election, April 10, 2006: Sainte-Marie–Saint-Jacques
Party	Candidate	Votes	%	±%
Parti Québécois	Martin Lemay	5,462	41.21	-8.63
Liberal	Nathalie Malépart	3,700	27.91	-2.56
Québec solidaire	Manon Massé	2,943	22.20	+15.72*
Green	Jean-Christophe Mortreux	815	6.15	+3.52
Action démocratique	Catherine Goyer	257	1.94	−6.39
Independent	Jocelyne Leduc	50	0.38	–
Independent	Régent Millette	28	0.21	–
Total valid votes		13,255	99.24	–
Total rejected ballots		101	0.76	–
Turnout		13,356	31.47	-30.04
Electors on the lists		42,437	–	–
Parti Québécois hold		Swing		-3.04
* Quebec solidaire vote is compared to the UFP vote in the 2003 election.

== See also ==
- Vision Montreal Crisis, 1997

Political offices
Preceded by Ginette L'Heureux (RCM)	City Councillor, District of Maisonneuve; 1994-1998	Succeeded by Richer Dompierre (Vision Montreal)
