= Roxane Milot =

Canadian politician

Roxane Milot MNA

Member of the National Assembly for Sainte-Marie–Saint-Jacques
- Incumbent
- Assumed office October 5, 2026
- Preceded by: Manon Massé

President of Québec solidaire
- In office November 26, 2023 – October 6, 2026
- Preceded by: Nicolas Chatel-Launay
- Succeeded by: Emmanuelle Tremblay (interim)

Personal details
- Party: Québec solidaire

Roxane Milot is a member of Québec solidaire elected for the riding of Sainte-Marie–Saint-Jacques.

Milot is currently the president of Québec solidaire.

== Electoral record ==
2026 Quebec general election: Sainte-Marie–Saint-Jacques
** Preliminary results — Not yet official **
Party	Candidate	Votes	%	±%
Québec solidaire	Roxane Milot	10,921	43.15	
Liberal	Justine McIntyre	6,429	25.40	
Parti Québécois	Philippe Schnobb	5,055	19.97	
Conservative	Antoine Corminboeuf	1,135	4.48	
Coalition Avenir Québec	Eli Zytoon	1,062	4.20	
Green	Lina Zdruli	299	1.18	
Parti nul	Rachël Frenette	115	0.45	
Parti culinaire	Justin Bouchard	91	0.36	
Climat Québec	Dominique Blanchard	65	0.26	
Marxist–Leninist	Linda Sullivan	48	0.19	
Communist	Adrien Welsh	46	0.18	
Bloc Pot	Chinook Blais-Leduc	44	0.17	
Total valid votes				
Total rejected ballots				
Turnout			59.45	
Québec solidaire hold		Swing		+
Source: Élections Québec
