= Saint-Jacques (provincial electoral district) =

Coordinates: 45.521°N 73.582°W

Quebec electoral district

Defunct provincial electoral district
- Legislature: National Assembly of Quebec
- District created: 1965
- District abolished: 1988
- First contested: 1966
- Last contested: 1985

Demographics
- Census division(s): Montreal (part)
- Census subdivision(s): Montreal (part)

Saint-Jacques was a provincial electoral district in the Montreal region of Quebec, Canada.

It corresponded to part of the Le Plateau-Mont-Royal and Ville-Marie areas of Montreal.

It was created for the 1966 election from parts of Montréal–Saint-Jacques, Montréal–Sainte-Marie and Montréal–Saint-Louis electoral districts. Its final election was in 1985. It disappeared in the 1989 election and its successor electoral district was Sainte-Marie–Saint-Jacques.

== Members of the Legislative Assembly / National Assembly ==
Legislature	Years	Member	Party
Riding created from Montréal–Saint-Jacques, Montréal–Sainte-Marie and Montréal–Saint-Louis
28th	1966–1969	Paul Dozois	Union Nationale
28th	1969–1970	Jean Cournoyer	Union Nationale
29th	1970–1973	Claude Charron	Parti Québécois
30th	1973–1976	Claude Charron	Parti Québécois
31st	1976–1981	Claude Charron	Parti Québécois
32nd	1981–1982	Claude Charron	Parti Québécois
32nd	1983–1984	Serge Champagne	Liberal
32nd	1984–1985	Jean-François Viau	Liberal
33rd	1985–1989	André Boulerice	Parti Québécois
Dissolved into Sainte-Marie–Saint-Jacques

== Election results ==
1985 Quebec general election
Party	Candidate	Votes	%	±%
Parti Québécois	André Boulerice	10,659	48.61	+7.19
Liberal	Jean-François Viau	8,795	40.11	-9.01
New Democratic	Pierre Graveline	1,115	5.08	-
Parti indépendantiste	Denis Monière	417	1.90	-
Humanist	Marie-Claire Desroches	314	1.43	-
Independent	Pierre Beauregard	164	0.75	-
Union Nationale	Normand Huneault	129	0.59	-
Socialist Movement	Johanne Galipeau	106	0.48	-
Christian Socialist	Gérard Lachance	68	0.31	-
Communist	Marianne Roy	64	0.29	-
Commonwealth of Canada	Catherine Fortier	41	0.19	-
United Social Credit	Micheline Mohamed	32	0.15	-0.53
Christian Socialist	Patrick Michaud	23	0.11	-
Total valid votes		21,927	97,96	
Rejected and declined votes		457	2,04	
Turnout		22,384	68.93	
Electors on the lists		32,474		
Parti Québécois gain from Liberal		Swing		+8.10
Source: Official Results, Le Directeur général des élections du Québec.

Quebec provincial by-election, 26 November 1984
Party	Candidate	Votes	%
Liberal	Jean-François Viau	7,889	49.12
Parti Québécois	André Boulerice	6,651	41.42
Independent	Patrice Legendre	699	4.35
Workers	Gérard Lachance	268	1.67
Not affiliated	Patricia Métivier	156	0.97
Unitaire	Jacques Tardif	145	0.90
United Social Credit	Marcel Tremblay	109	0.68
Parti République du Québec	Jacques Lambert	77	0.48
Independent	Georges Tassé	66	0.41
Total valid votes		16,060	97,83
Rejected and declined votes		356	2,17
Turnout		16,416	50.64
Electors on the lists		32,414	
Source: Official Results, Le Directeur général des élections du Québec.
