= Option citoyenne =

Defunct feminist organization

Option citoyenne ([ɔpsjɔ̃ sitwajɛn]) was an alterglobalization, sovereigntist and feminist political organization in the Canadian province of Quebec. The group was created by Françoise David in 2004; David and François Saillant were its official spokespersons. Option citoyenne gave official support to the left-wing Union des forces progressistes, and in 2006 the two groups merged to create Québec solidaire.
