= Sainte-Marie–Saint-Jacques =

Provincial electoral district in Quebec, Canada

Coordinates: 45.525°N 73.545°W

Sainte-Marie–Saint Jacques
Quebec electoral district
- Location in Montreal

Provincial electoral district
- Legislature: National Assembly of Quebec
MNA
Roxane Milot
Québec solidaire
- District created: 1988
- First contested: 1989
- Last contested: 2026

Demographics
- Population (2006): 58,563
- Electors (2014): 42,287
- Area (km²): 15.3
- Pop. density (per km²): 3,827.6
- Census division: Montreal (part)
- Census subdivision: Montreal (part)

Sainte-Marie–Saint-Jacques (French pronunciation: [sɛ̃t maʁi sɛ̃ ʒak]) is a provincial electoral district in the Montreal region of Quebec, Canada, that elects members to the National Assembly of Quebec. It comprises part of the borough of Ville-Marie and part of the borough of Le Plateau-Mont-Royal of the city of Montreal, including the eastern portion of Downtown Montreal as well as the Vieux-Montreal area.

It was created for the 1989 election from parts of Saint-Jacques and Sainte-Marie electoral districts.

In the change from the 2001 to the 2011 electoral map, its territory was unchanged.

== Members of the National Assembly ==
Legislature	Years	Member	Party
Riding created from Saint-Jacques and Sainte-Marie
34th	1989–1994	André Boulerice	Parti Québécois
35th	1994–1998	André Boulerice	Parti Québécois
36th	1998–2003	André Boulerice	Parti Québécois
37th	2003–2005	André Boulerice	Parti Québécois
37th	2006–2007	Martin Lemay	Parti Québécois
38th	2007–2008	Martin Lemay	Parti Québécois
39th	2008–2012	Martin Lemay	Parti Québécois
40th	2012–2014	Daniel Breton	Parti Québécois
41st	2014–2018	Manon Massé	Québec solidaire
42nd	2018–2022	Manon Massé	Québec solidaire
43rd	2022–2026	Manon Massé	Québec solidaire
44th	2026–Present	Roxane Milot	Québec solidaire

== Election results ==
2026 Quebec general election
** Preliminary results — Not yet official **
Party	Candidate	Votes	%	±%
Québec solidaire	Roxane Milot	10,921	43.15	
Liberal	Justine McIntyre	6,429	25.40	
Parti Québécois	Philippe Schnobb	5,055	19.97	
Conservative	Antoine Corminboeuf	1,135	4.48	
Coalition Avenir Québec	Eli Zytoon	1,062	4.20	
Green	Lina Zdruli	299	1.18	
Parti nul	Rachël Frenette	115	0.45	
Parti culinaire	Justin Bouchard	91	0.36	
Climat Québec	Dominique Blanchard	65	0.26	
Marxist–Leninist	Linda Sullivan	48	0.19	
Communist	Adrien Welsh	46	0.18	
Bloc Pot	Chinook Blais-Leduc	44	0.17	
Total valid votes				
Total rejected ballots				
Turnout			59.45	
Québec solidaire hold		Swing		+
Source: Élections Québec

2022 Quebec general election
Party	Candidate	Votes	%	±%
Québec solidaire	Manon Massé	10,892	47.69	-1.59
Liberal	Christopher Baenninger	3,621	15.85	-5.30
Parti Québécois	Phoeby Laplante	3,362	14.72	+0.73
Coalition Avenir Québec	Aurélie Diep	3,268	14.31	+3.32
Conservative	Stefan Marquis	1,138	4.98	+4.46
Green	Hailey Roop	450	1.97	-1.52
Marxist–Leninist	Linda Sullivan	64	0.28	–
Climat Québec	Jency Mercier	46	0.20	–
Total valid votes		22,841	99.11	–
Total rejected ballots		205	0.89	-0.15
Turnout		23,046	56.23	-3.19
Electors on the lists		40,988	–	–

2018 Quebec general election
Party	Candidate	Votes	%	±%
Québec solidaire	Manon Massé	12,429	49.28	+18.68
Liberal	Louis Charron	5,335	21.15	-9.12
Parti Québécois	Jennifer Drouin	3,528	13.99	-13.62
Coalition Avenir Québec	Anna Klisko	2,773	10.99	+2.42
Green	Anna Calderon	881	3.49	+1.43
Conservative	Don Ivanski	130	0.52	–
Bloc Pot	Henri Ladouceur	73	0.29	-0.30
Citoyens au pouvoir	Alexis Cossette-Trudel	72	0.29	–
Total valid votes		25,221	98.96	
Total rejected ballots		266	1.04	
Turnout		25,487	59.42	-6.54
Eligible voters		42,894		
Québec solidaire hold		Swing		+13.90
Source(s) "Rapport des résultats officiels du scrutin". Élections Québec.

2014 Quebec general election
Party	Candidate	Votes	%	±%
Québec solidaire	Manon Massé	8,437	30.60	+5.17
Liberal	Anna Klisko	8,346	30.27	+10.96
Parti Québécois	Daniel Breton	7,612	27.61	-8.07
Coalition Avenir Québec	Patrick Thauvette	2,364	8.57	-6.21
Green	Stewart Wiseman	393	1.43	–
Option nationale	Nic Payne	210	0.76	-2.33
Bloc Pot	Marc Bissonnette	164	0.59	–
Marxist–Leninist	Serge Lachapelle	47	0.17	-0.04
Total valid votes		27,573	98.86	–
Total rejected ballots		318	1.14	–
Turnout		27,891	65.96	-2.22
Electors on the lists		42,287	–	–
Québec solidaire gain from Parti Québécois		Swing		
Source: Official Results, Élections Québec.

2012 Quebec general election
Party	Candidate	Votes	%	±%
Parti Québécois	Daniel Breton	10,199	35.76	-10.86
Québec solidaire	Manon Massé	7,253	25.43	+10.03
Liberal	Étienne Collins	5,531	19.39	-8.83
Coalition Avenir Québec	Cédrick Beauregard	4,216	14.78	+10.76*
Option nationale	Denis Monière	880	3.09	–
Middle Class	Louis Provencher	143	0.50	–
Independent	Jean-Marc Labrèche	123	0.43	–
Quebec Citizens' Union	Edson Emilio	87	0.31	–
Marxist–Leninist	Serge Lachapelle	60	0.21	-0.17
Independent	Dimitri Mourkes	31	0.11	–
Total valid votes		28,523	98.94	–
Total rejected ballots		305	1.06	–
Turnout		28,828	68.18	+20.94
Electors on the lists		42,283	–	–
Parti Québécois hold		Swing		-10.45
* Coalition avenir vote is compared to the Action démocratique vote in the 2008 election.

2008 Quebec general election
Party	Candidate	Votes	%	±%
Parti Québécois	Martin Lemay	9,236	46.62	+5.28
Liberal	Éric Prud'homme	5,590	28.22	+4.52
Québec solidaire	Manon Massé	3,051	15.40	+1.24
Green	Annie Morel	1,062	5.36	-4.32
Action démocratique	Dominic Boisvert	796	4.02	-6.74
Marxist–Leninist	Serge Lachapelle	76	0.38	+0.02
Total valid votes		19,811	98.60	–
Total rejected ballots		282	1.40	–
Turnout		20,093	47.24	-13.62
Electors on the lists		42,530	–	–

2007 Quebec general election
Party	Candidate	Votes	%	±%
Parti Québécois	Martin Lemay	10,501	41.34	+0.13
Liberal	Denise Dussault	6,021	23.70	-4.21
Québec solidaire	Manon Massé	3,596	14.16	-8.04
Action démocratique	Jean-Stéphane Dupervil	2,733	10.76	+8.82
Green	Corinne Ardon	2,460	9.68	+3.53
Marxist–Leninist	Serge Lachapelle	92	0.36	–
Total valid votes		25,403	99.02	–
Total rejected ballots		251	0.98	–
Turnout		25,654	60.86	+29.39
Electors on the lists		42,150	–	–

Quebec provincial by-election, April 10, 2006
Party	Candidate	Votes	%	±%
Parti Québécois	Martin Lemay	5,462	41.21	-8.63
Liberal	Nathalie Malépart	3,700	27.91	-2.56
Québec solidaire	Manon Massé	2,943	22.20	+15.72*
Green	Jean-Christophe Mortreux	815	6.15	+3.52
Action démocratique	Catherine Goyer	257	1.94	−6.39
Independent	Jocelyne Leduc	50	0.38	–
Independent	Régent Millette	28	0.21	–
Total valid votes		13,255	99.24	–
Total rejected ballots		101	0.76	–
Turnout		13,356	31.47	-30.04
Electors on the lists		42,437	–	–
Parti Québécois hold		Swing		-3.04
* Quebec solidaire vote is compared to the UFP vote in the 2003 election.

2003 Quebec general election
Party	Candidate	Votes	%	±%
Parti Québécois	André Boulerice	13,066	49.84	-3.10
Liberal	Richard Brosseau	7,989	30.47	-0.67
Action démocratique	Annick Brousseau	2,183	8.33	-1.83
UFP	Gaétan Breton	1,699	6.48	–
Green	Robert Ruffo	690	2.63	–
Bloc Pot	Antoine Théorêt-Poupart	444	1.69	-0.60
Marxist–Leninist	Ginette Boutet	87	0.33	-0.05
Christian Democracy	Maria Da Luz D.S Inacio	59	0.23	–

1998 Quebec general election
Party	Candidate	Votes	%	±%
Parti Québécois	André Boulerice	16,530	52.94	-1.79
Liberal	Claude Longpré	9,722	31.14	-1.79
Action démocratique	Chrystian Carbonneau	3,171	10.16	+4.63
Bloc Pot	Partice Caron	715	2.29	–
Socialist Democracy	Ginette Gauthier	629	2.01	-0.02
Marxist–Leninist	Ginette Boutet	120	0.38	+0.14
Communist	André Cloutier	115	0.37	+0.04
Natural Law	Alain Lord	107	0.34	-0.47
Equality	Peter Romaniuk	77	0.25	–
No designation	Michel Dugré	38	0.12	–

1995 Quebec referendum
Side	Votes	%
Oui	23,879	58.65
Non	16,838	41.35

1994 Quebec general election
Party	Candidate	Votes	%	±%
Parti Québécois	André Boulerice	16,723	54.73	-0.56
Liberal	Martin Doré	10,061	32.93	-2.91
Action démocratique	André Belzile	1,691	5.53	–
New Democratic	Jocelyne Dupuis	621	2.03	+0.84
No designation	Claude Leduc	479	1.57	–
Natural Law	Christian Lord	246	0.81	–
Sovereignty	Daniel Brunette	223	0.73	–
Independent	Martram X.T. Marxram	109	0.36	–
Republic of Canada	François Ludanyi	108	0.35	+0.15
Communist	André Cloutier	100	0.33	+0.04
Marxist–Leninist	Normand Chouinard	74	0.24	-0.05
Development	Charles Thibault	62	0.20	–
No designation	Guy Tremblay	59	0.19	–

1992 Charlottetown Accord referendum
Side	Votes	%
Non	21,640	70.76
Oui	8,942	29.24

1989 Quebec general election
Party	Candidate	Votes	%
Parti Québécois	André Boulerice	15,489	55.29
Liberal	Michel Laporte	10,039	35.84
Green	Jean Ouimet	1,488	5.31
New Democratic	Denis Plante	332	1.19
Workers	Gérard Lachance	189	0.67
Parti indépendantiste	Gilles Rhéaume	148	0.53
Independent	Michel Georges Abdelahad	109	0.39
Communist	Marianne Roy	82	0.29
Marxist–Leninist	Pierre Chénier	81	0.29
Republic of Canada	Claire Pouliot	57	0.20

== See also ==
- List of Quebec provincial electoral districts
- Canadian provincial electoral districts
