= Christin Milloy =

Canadian politician and LGBT activist

Christin Scarlett Milloy is a Canadian politician and LGBT activist. She was the first political candidate at the Canadian provincial level to publicly identify as transgender and ran for the Ontario Libertarian Party. In 2014, she helped lead the Trans Pride march. She is a member of the Trans Lobby Group, which lobbied at Queen's Park to pass Toby's Law, and has campaigned for transgender rights and gay-straight alliances for LGBT youth.

== Politics and activism ==
=== Ontario provincial election candidature ===
In 2011, at age 27, Milloy was a candidate in the Ontario provincial election, running for the Libertarian Party. Priorities of her platform included simplifying the process of changing one's sex designation on a birth certificate, increasing government-sponsored coverage of sex reassignment procedures, eliminating the harmonized sales tax (HST), and redistributing alcohol sales from the LCBO to private businesses, "such as convenience stores."

=== Publications ===
In June 2014, Milloy published "Don't Let the Doctor Do This to your Newborn" on Slate.com, which advocated against observing an infant's sex. According to PQ Monthly, it was met with "venomous opposition." In an interview discussing the article and its surrounding controversy, Milloy advocated for de-legislating gender, which she described as a "necessary and positive step forward for our society."

Milloy runs a blog covering the topic of transgender issues.

== Personal life ==
Milloy grew up in Mississauga. In a 2014 Toronto Star article, Milloy stated that her parents accepted her gender identity while her brother did not. She began identifying as a transgender woman at the age of 23. She works as a web developer.
