= Raymond Blain =

Canadian politician

Montreal City Councillor
- In office November 9, 1986 – May 5, 1992
- Preceded by: Sammy Forcillo
- Succeeded by: Sammy Forcillo
- Constituency: Saint-Jacques

Personal details
- Born: 1950/51
- Died: May 5, 1992 (age 41)
- Party: Montreal Citizens' Movement

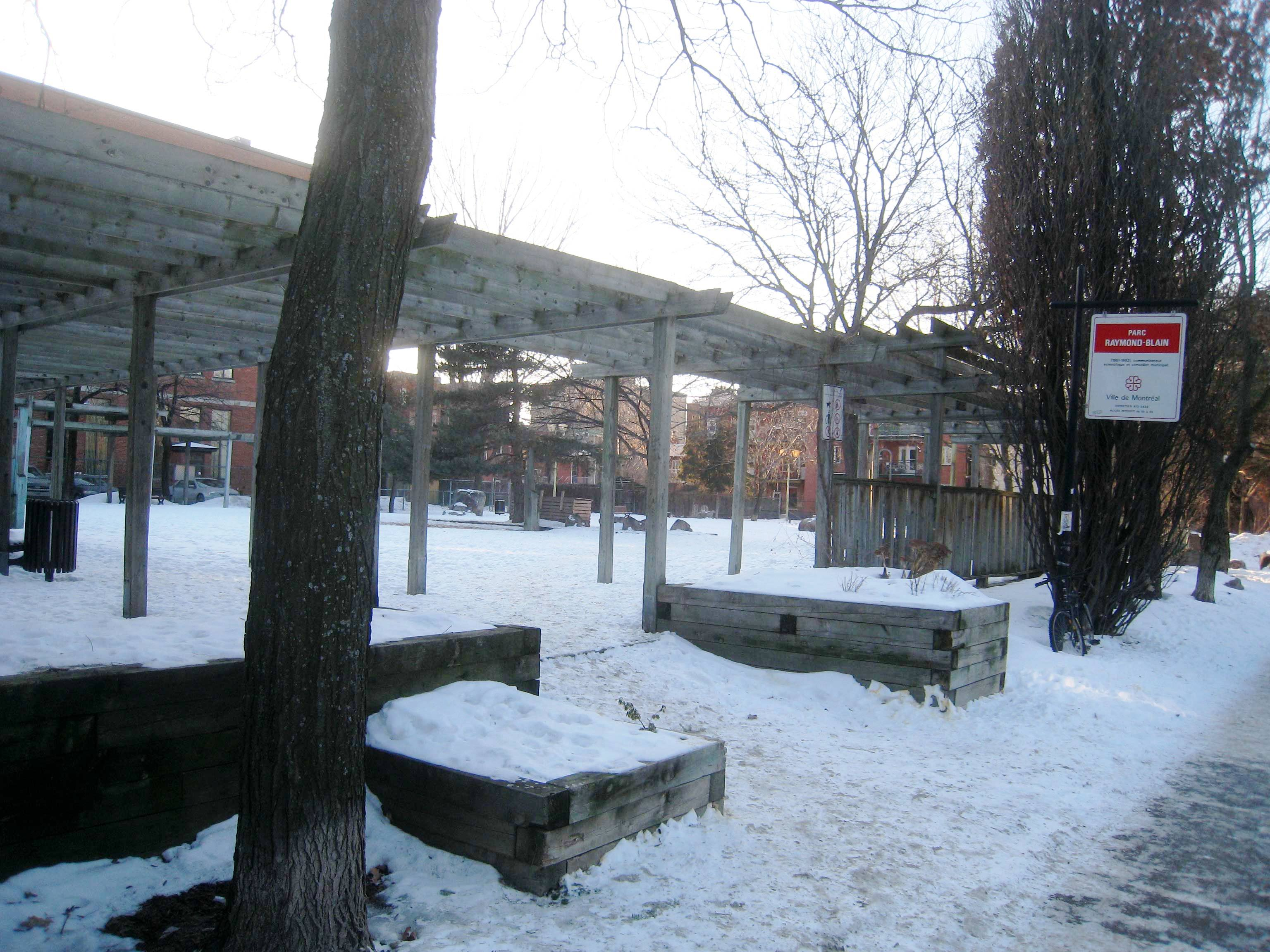
Parc Raymond-Blain, winter 2010

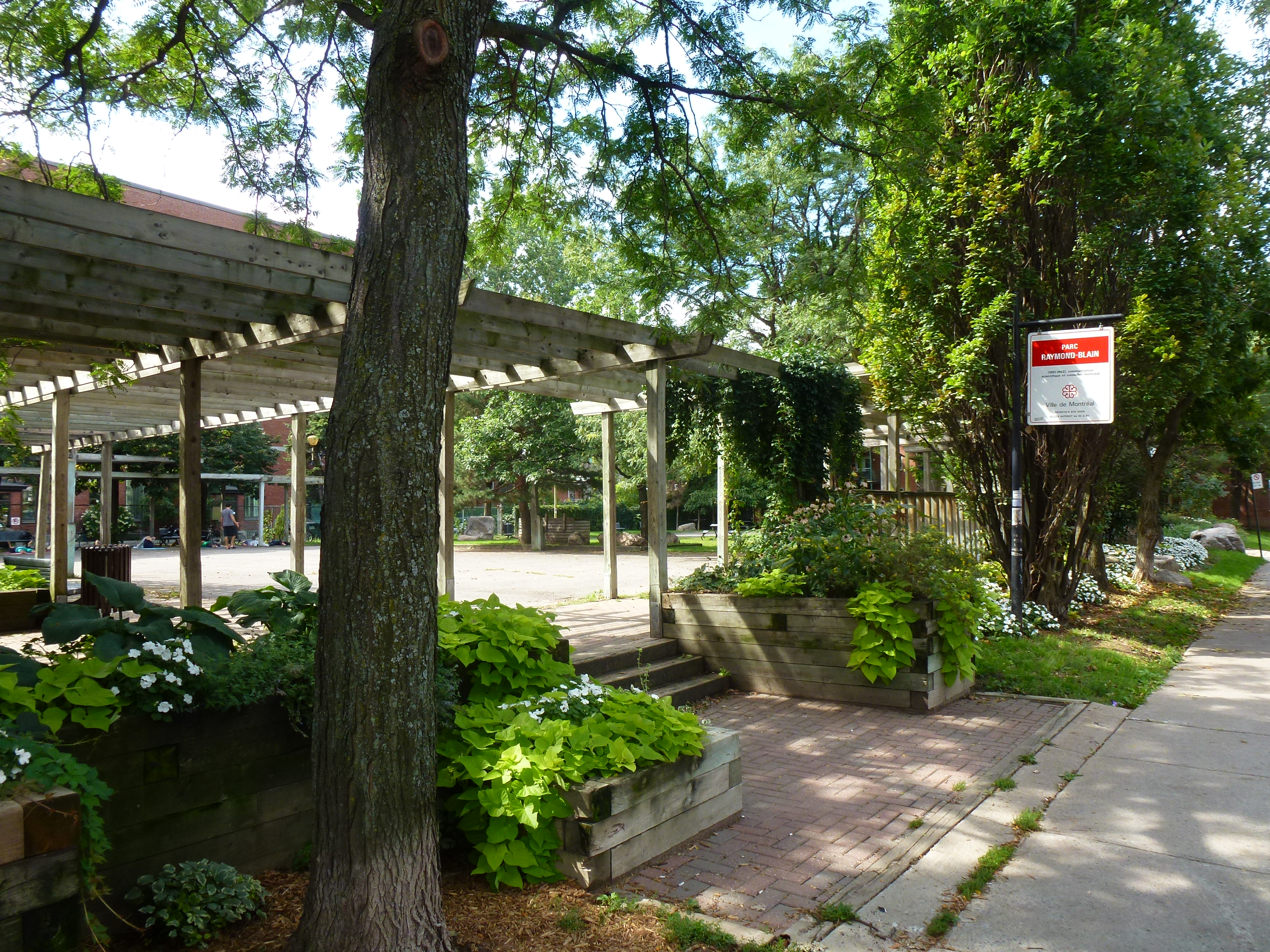
Parc Raymond-Blain, summer 2011

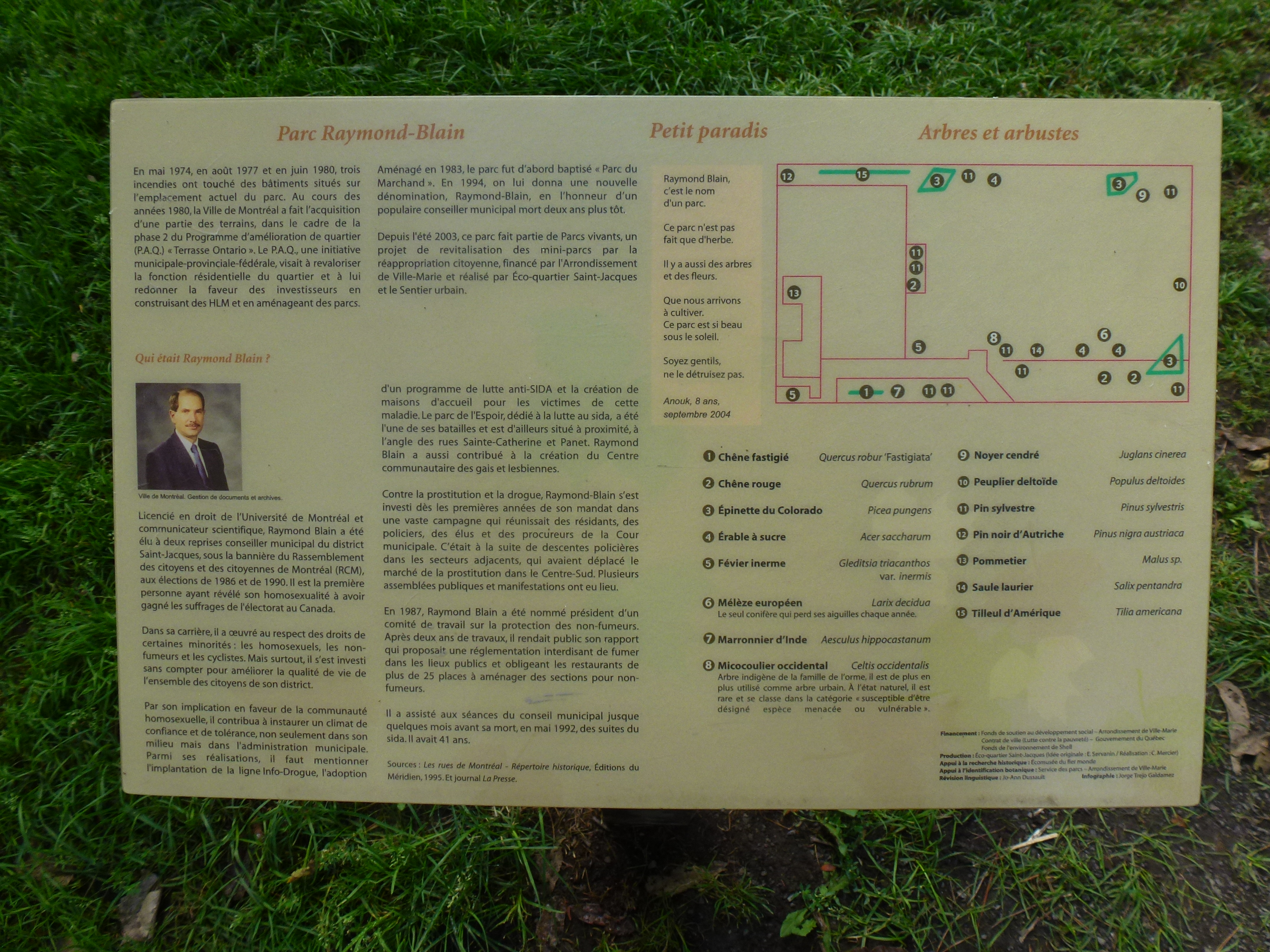
Parc Raymond-Blain, commemorative plaque

Raymond Blain was a Canadian politician who served on the Montreal City Council from 1986 to 1992. He has been credited the first openly gay politician elected to public office in both Quebec and Canada as a whole, although he was later confirmed to have been preceded by at least one other figure — Bécancour mayor and MNA Maurice Richard — whose pioneering status was overlooked by media at the time.

Prior to his election to council, Blain studied law at the Université de Montréal and sociology, science and recreation at the Université du Québec à Montréal, and worked as a science educator.

== Political career ==
Blain first ran for office in the 1986 election, as a candidate for Jean Doré's Montreal Citizens' Movement party in the Saint-Jacques district, which included the city's Gay Village. Late in the campaign, as it became increasingly apparent that Blain was likely to win, some supporters of incumbent councillor Sammy Forcillo began using anti-gay slurs to turn voters against Blain, although Forcillo personally denounced the tactic. On election day, Blain defeated Forcillo by a margin of 695 votes.

Early in his city council term, he was responsible for helping to establish the city's first public health plan to combat HIV/AIDS, and for establishing a new committee to oversee and develop the city's burgeoning network of bicycle lanes.

At Christmas in 1987, he dressed up as Santa Claus and distributed condoms as part of a safer sex education campaign in the Gay Village. He also supported the establishment of a network of supportive housing for people living with HIV and AIDS in the city, and lobbied for the city to provide spousal benefits to same-sex partners of city employees. He also spoke out in favour of greater tolerance of LGBT people after the 1989 murder of Joe Rose.

He championed issues including affordable housing and the imposition of a smoking ban on public property. Along with council colleagues Richard Brunelle, André Lavallée, Abe Limonchik and Diane Martin, he endorsed a report in 1990 which criticized the city's development planning process, calling for new buildings in the downtown core to be limited to a maximum of 39 storeys.

In 1988, he was one of several councillors, alongside Sam Boskey, Marcel Sévigny, Pierre Goyer, Marvin Rotrand and Arnold Bennett, who voted against the city leasing office space from Trizec Properties, because the company also leased space to the consulate of South Africa.

He later served on the civilian board overseeing the Service de police de la Ville de Montréal, and as vice-chair of the council's culture and community development committee.

He was re-elected in the 1990 municipal election with over 50 per cent of the vote in his ward. He called his 1990 victory a special moment for the city's gay community, because it illustrated that voters who had opposed him in 1986 because of his sexual orientation were beginning to consider it a non-issue.

== Death ==
In the late fall of 1991 and the winter of 1992, Blain's health began to decline due to complications from AIDS; he missed several city council meetings, including the passage of the city's 1992 budget. He died of AIDS-related complications on May 5, 1992, at age 41. Just days before his death, the city passed the same-sex spousal benefits policy he had long campaigned for. A memorial church service was held in his honour at the city's Église Sainte-Brigide-de-Kildare on May 8.

In a municipal by-election on November 1, 1992, Forcillo defeated MCM candidate Claude Watters and 11 other challengers, including AIDS activists Douglas Buckley-Couvrette and Gregory Tutko, to reclaim the seat.

The parc Raymond-Blain, located on Panet Street, between Lafontaine and Logan streets in the heart of the Gay Village, was dedicated in his honor in 1994.
