= André Boulerice =

Canadian politician (born 1946)

André Boulerice MNA
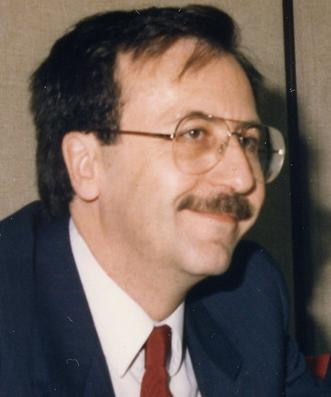

Member of the National Assembly of Quebec for Sainte-Marie–Saint-Jacques
- In office September 25, 1989 – September 12, 2005
- Preceded by: District created
- Succeeded by: Martin Lemay

Personal details
- Born: 8 May 1946 (age 79) Joliette, Quebec
- Party: Parti Québécois

André Boulerice (born May 8, 1946) is a Canadian politician from Quebec and gay rights activist. He was a member of the National Assembly of Quebec for the riding of Sainte-Marie–Saint-Jacques in Montreal.

Born in Joliette, Quebec, he graduated in specialized education from Cégep du Vieux Montréal. He joined the Parti Québécois in 1970 and later worked for the Chambly school board.

He was first elected to the legislature in the 1985 election, representing the electoral district of Saint-Jacques. Boulerice, one of the first openly gay members of the legislature, was reelected in 1989, 1994, 1998 and 2003 in the redistributed electoral district of Sainte-Marie–Saint-Jacques. He was also the deputy government leader, president of the Quebec division of the Assemblée parlementaire de la Francophonie and immigration minister. He helped introduce civil union for same-sex couples. Boulerice resigned in September 2005.

== Electoral record (partial) ==
1998 Quebec general election: Sainte-Marie–Saint-Jacques
| Party | Candidate | Votes | % | ±% |
|---|---|---|---|---|
| Parti Québécois | André Boulerice | 16,530 | 52.94 | −1.79 |
| Liberal | Claude Longpré | 9,722 | 31.14 | −1.79 |
| Action démocratique | Chrystian Carbonneau | 3,171 | 10.16 | +4.63 |
| Bloc Pot | Patrice Caron | 715 | 2.29 | – |
| Socialist Democracy | Ginette Gauthier | 629 | 2.01 | −0.02 |
| Marxist–Leninist | Ginette Boutet | 120 | 0.38 | +0.14 |
| Communist | André Cloutier | 115 | 0.37 | +0.04 |
| Natural Law | Alain Lord | 107 | 0.34 | −0.47 |
| Equality | Peter Romaniuk | 77 | 0.25 | – |
| N/A (Communist League) | Michel Dugré | 38 | 0.12 | – |
| Total valid votes | | 31,224 | 100.00 | |
| Rejected and declined votes | | 470 | | |
| Turnout | | 31,694 | 67.51 | −7.56 |
| Electors on the lists | | 46,950 | | |
Source: Official Results, Le Directeur général des élections du Québec.

1994 Quebec general election: Sainte-Marie–Saint-Jacques
| Party | Candidate | Votes | % |
|---|---|---|---|
| Parti Québécois | André Boulerice | 16,723 | 54.73 |
| Liberal | Martin Oré | 10,061 | 32.93 |
| Action démocratique | André Belzile | 1,691 | 5.53 |
| New Democratic | Jocelyne Dupuis | 621 | 2.03 |
| Non-Affiliated | Claude Leduc | 479 | 1.57 |
| Natural Law | Christian Lord | 246 | 0.81 |
| Sovereignty | Daniel Brunette | 223 | 0.73 |
| Independent | Martram X.T Marxram | 109 | 0.36 |
| Commonwealth of Canada | François Ludanyi | 108 | 0.35 |
| Communist | André Cloutier | 100 | 0.33 |
| Marxist–Leninist | Normand Chouinard | 74 | 0.24 |
| Development | Charles Thibault | 62 | 0.20 |
| Non-Affiliated | Guy Tremblay | 59 | 0.19 |
| Total valid votes | | 30,556 | |
| Rejected and declined votes | | 561 | |
| Turnout | | 31,117 | 75.07 |
| Electors on the lists | | 41,452 | |
Source: Official Results, Le Directeur général des élections du Québec.
