= Claude Charron =

Canadian politician from Quebec (born 1946)

Claude Charron (born October 22, 1946, in L'Île-Bizard, Quebec) is a former CEGEP teacher, provincial politician, writer and broadcaster. He became Minister of Parliamentary Affairs and the youngest Member of the National Assembly of Quebec.

== Background ==
He graduated from the École de Saint-Raphaël in L'Île-Bizard and Collège Saint-Laurent. Charron received his master's in political science from the Université de Montréal. He was the vice-president of the Union générale des étudiants du Québec (UGEQ) (General Union of Quebec Students) in 1968 and 1969. During 1969 and 1970 he taught at Cégep Édouard-Montpetit and the Cégep du Vieux Montréal.

Before running provincially, Charron participated in the foundation of the Mouvement Souveraineté-Association in 1967. He was also an anti-Vietnam War activist and expressed an interest in syndicalism.

== Political career ==
In 1970, Claude Charron entered provincial politics. He was elected to the National Assembly of Quebec as the Parti Québécois candidate in the riding of Saint-Jacques (now part of Sainte-Marie–Saint-Jacques) and was reelected in 1973, 1976, and 1981. At the time of his first election, Charron became the youngest MNA (Member of the National Assembly (Quebec)) in the province's history. Following the election of his party to power in 1976 he was appointed Minister responsible for High Commission on Youth, Recreation and Sports and in 1979 was named the Government House Leader and Minister responsible for Parliamentary Affairs.

In February 1982 Charron resigned his cabinet position after pleading guilty to a charge of shoplifting a tweed jacket from the Eaton's Montreal department store. Charron was found by a security guard wearing the coat with the price tag still attached. He later described the act as a form of political suicide after the PQ's failures in the 1980 referendum and constitutional negotiations.

In November of that year he was charged with drunk driving and resigned his seat in the Quebec National Assembly. The following year Charron published his memoir in the French language under the title Désobéir. In this book he confirmed his homosexuality.

== After politics ==
Since leaving politics Charron has worked in radio and television, notably with the TVA network and Radio-Canada, and has contributed to the news magazine L'actualité. He is currently the correspondent for TVA in Paris but had worked alongside Pierre Bruneau during the special televised program for the 2007 Quebec elections.

== Electoral record (incomplete) ==
1981 Quebec general election: Saint-Jacques
| Party | Candidate | Votes | % |
|---|---|---|---|
| Parti Québécois | Claude Charron | 15,727 | 63.44 |
| Liberal | Marcel Tremblay | 8,142 | 32.84 |
| Union Nationale | Denis Simard | 443 | 1.79 |
| Workers Communist | Suzanne Lortie | 204 | 0.82 |
| Workers | Johanne Perreault | 100 | 0.40 |
| United Social Credit | André Poulin | 62 | 0.25 |
| Revolutionary Workers League | Michel Dugré | 62 | 0.25 |
| Marxist–Leninist | Arnold August | 51 | 0.21 |
| Total valid votes | | 24,791 | 100.00 |
| Rejected and declined votes | | 340 | |
| Turnout | | 25,131 | 72.45 |
| Electors on the lists | | 34,687 | |
Source: Official Results, Le Directeur général des élections du Québec.
