= Julie Lemieux (politician) =

Canadian politician

- Born: Drummondville, Quebec
- Occupations: Mayor, Politician
- Years active: 2013–present

Julie Lemieux is a Canadian politician, who was elected mayor of Très-Saint-Rédempteur, Quebec in the 2017 Quebec municipal elections. She is the village's first female mayor, and the first transgender person elected to the mayoralty of any municipality in Canada.

Formerly from Drummondville, Lemieux previously worked as a cabinetmaker, and first moved to Très-Saint-Rédempteur in 2009. She was first drawn into politics as part of a successful campaign to preserve the village's closed Roman Catholic church, which was formerly slated for demolition, as a community and cultural centre, and was first elected to the municipal council in the 2013 municipal election. Her mayoral campaign planks included improving communications between elected officials and residents in the village, and permitting village residents to keep backyard chickens. She received 48 per cent of the vote on election day, to just 23 per cent for incumbent mayor Jean Lalonde.
