= Québec solidaire =

Political party in Quebec, Canada

- Abbreviation: QS
- Leader: Collective leadership; (de facto)
- President: Emmanuelle Tremblay (interim)
- Spokespersons: Sol Zanetti; Ruba Ghazal
- Parliamentary Leader: Ruba Ghazal
- Founder: Françoise David
- Founded: 4 February 2006; 20 years ago
- Merger of: UFP (2006); Option citoyenne (2006); Option nationale (2017)
- Headquarters: Montreal, Quebec, Canada
- Membership (2026): 20,000
- Ideology: Democratic socialism; Environmentalism; Quebec sovereigntism
- Political position: Left-wing
- Colours: Orange
- Seats in the National Assembly: 9 / 127

Website
- quebecsolidaire.net

Québec solidaire ([ke.bɛk sɔ.li.daɛ̯ʁ], lit. 'Quebec Solidarity', QS) is a left wing, democratic socialist and sovereigntist political party in Quebec, Canada. The party and media outlets in Canada usually use the name "Québec solidaire" in both French and English; however, the party's name is sometimes translated as "Solidarity Quebec" or "Quebec Solidarity" in English-language media outside Canada.

== History ==
=== Foundation ===
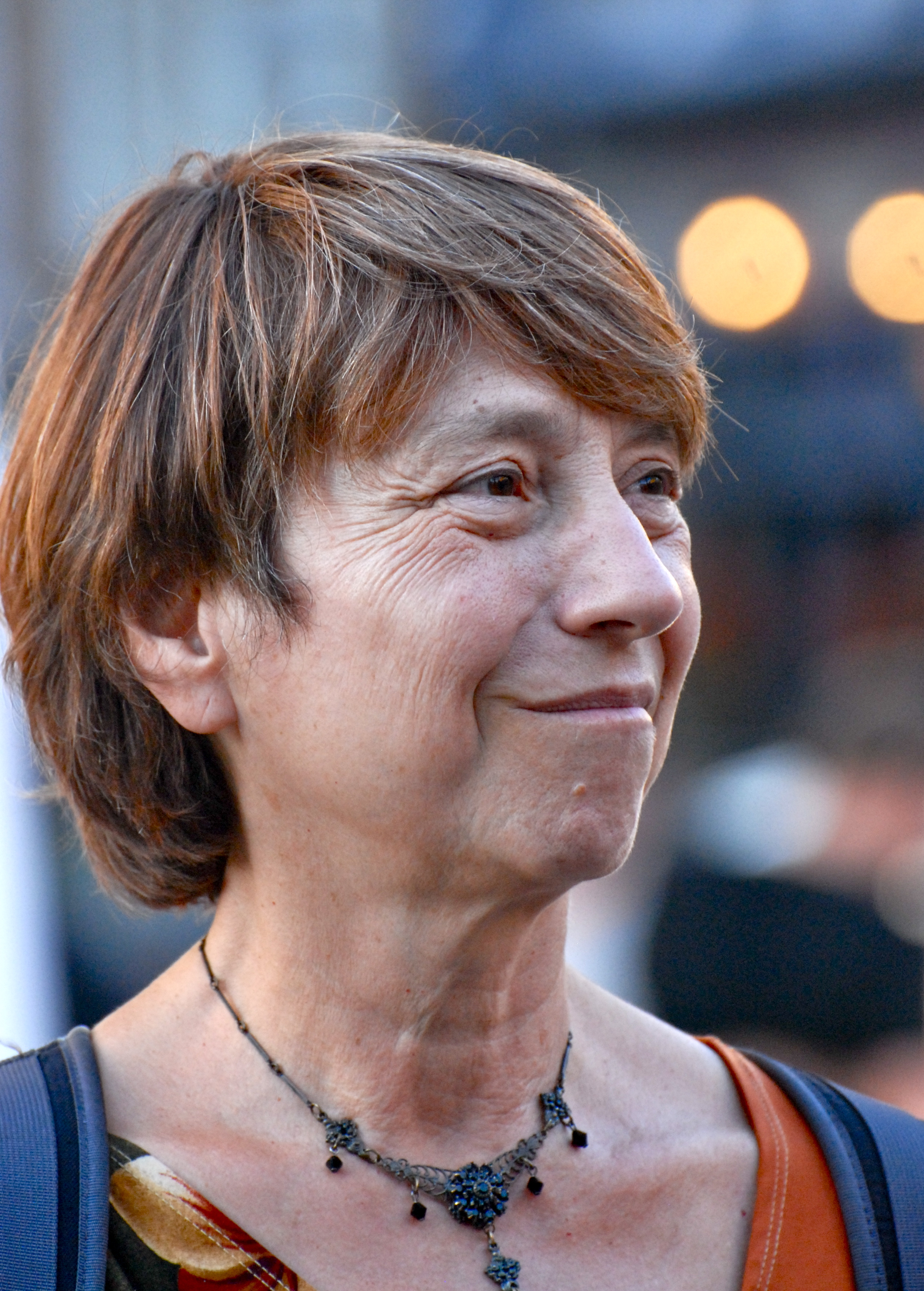
Françoise David, who founded the party

Québec solidaire was founded on 4 February 2006 in Montreal by the merger of the left-wing party Union des forces progressistes (UFP) and the alter-globalization political movement Option Citoyenne, led by Françoise David. It was formed by a number of activists and politicians who had written Manifeste pour un Québec solidaire, a left-wing response to Pour un Québec lucide. Pour un Québec lucide presented a distinctly neoliberal analysis of and set of solutions to Quebec's problems, particularly criticizing the sovereignty movement as distracting from Quebec's real issues and the Quebec social model as inefficient and out-of-date. Pour un Québec solidaire presented an alternate analysis, and later its writers formed the party Quebec solidaire, taking its name from the manifesto.

Françoise David and Amir Khadir were named as the two spokespersons at the party's founding.

=== Electoral activity ===
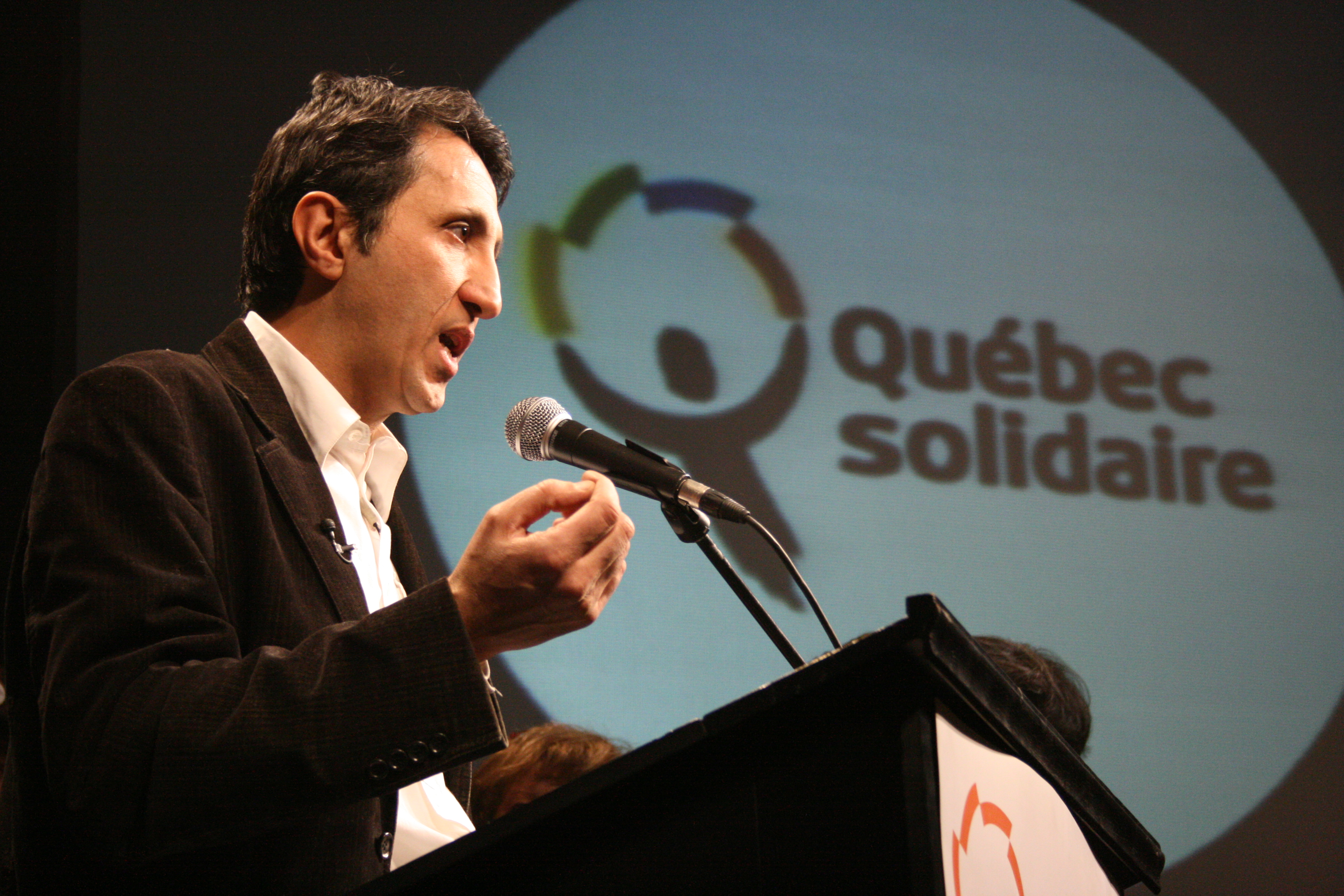
Victory speech of Amir Khadir after his election, 8 December 2008

Québec solidaire's first political venture was to field a candidate, Manon Massé, in a 10 April 2006 by-election in Sainte-Marie–Saint-Jacques. She received 22% of the vote. Eight years later, she became QS' third MNA.

Québec solidaire contested the 2007 Quebec election. It won 3.65% of the popular vote and received 144,418 votes, 0.21% behind the Green Party of Quebec. They were also endorsed by the Montreal Central Council of the Confédération des syndicats nationaux which represents 125,000 members in Quebec. According to an analysis on Canadian Dimension, this was the first time a trade union in Quebec has endorsed a party more left-wing than the Parti Québécois.

On 8 December 2008, the first Quebec solidaire candidate was elected in the provincial election. Amir Khadir was elected in the Montreal riding of Mercier. He won his seat for the second term in the 2012 election along with another QS candidate Françoise David in the Montreal riding of Gouin. Subsequently, Khadir stepped down as co-spokesperson in accordance with QS party rules that stipulate one spokesperson must be from outside the legislature. André Frappier served as interim co-spokesperson until Andrés Fontecilla was chosen on 5 May 2013 to permanently fill the role. David and Frontecilla led the party into the 2014 election where Manon Massé was elected in Sainte-Marie–Saint-Jacques, becoming the party's third MNA, joining David and Khadir who were both re-elected.

On 19 January 2017, Françoise David announced her immediate retirement as both party spokesperson and as a Member of the National Assembly due to her health. Massé was named the interim spokesperson, and later announced she would be a candidate for the position on a permanent basis. In March, Gabriel Nadeau-Dubois, one of the leaders of the 2012 Quebec student protests, joined the party as its candidate for the Gouin by-election and a candidate for party co-spokesperson. On 21 May 2017, at the party's annual convention, Massé and Nadeau-Dubois were elected as the party's spokespeople.

At the 2017 party convention, the party voted against co-operation with the Parti Québécois, and agreed to begin talks with the centre-left sovereignist Option nationale party. On 2 December 2017, QS party members approved the merger. On 10 December, ON members approved the merger, which gave them "collective" status within Québec solidaire.

In the 2018 election, Massé was put forward as the party's candidate for premier if the party formed government; she also participated in leaders' debates. Massé brought attention to the QS due to her "unconventional" performance in the debates where she used simple, blunt language. Ultimately, QS gained 7 seats, bringing them to a total of 10, tying the Parti Québécois.

On 22 November 2018, Québec solidaire, along with Parti Québécois, were granted official party status in the legislature. On 20 March 2019, the QS was officially recognized as the second opposition party, behind the Liberals and ahead of the Parti Québécois, after a PQ MNA left the party.

On 16 May 2021, Massé announced she would hand the parliamentary leadership role to Nadeau-Dubois, and that he would be the party's candidate for premier in the upcoming 2022 election. However, Massé said she would remain co-spokesperson.

The 2022 general election saw mixed results for Québec Solidaire. The party finished second in terms of overall votes for the first time in its history, winning 15.4% of the vote, and won eleven seats, its most ever. However, the party did not form official opposition, as the Liberal Party won 21 seats on 14.4% of the vote, and the 15.4% of the vote the party won was slightly lower than the 16% of the vote the party won in 2018. The party also lost a seat it was holding for the first time in its history, losing Rouyn-Noranda–Témiscamingue to the governing CAQ. Furthermore, as with the previous election, the party once again failed to meet the threshold in terms of number of seats or popular vote percentage required for official party status (unlike the previous election, the CAQ has refused to make an exception). This left all members of Québec Solidaire, along with the Parti Quebecois, to sit as independents.

On 13 March 2023, Québec Solidaire won a 12th seat in the Saint-Henri-Sainte-Anne by-election, vacated by former Liberal leader Dominique Anglade. This marked the highest number of seats the party has ever held, and enough for it to be entitled to official party status, having previously been granted the status on discretion.

On 26 November 2023, Émilise Lessard-Therrien was elected co-spokesperson of Québec Solidaire at the party congress in Gatineau, defeating Ruba Ghazal and Christine Labrie. She obtained 50.3% of the votes in the second round, against 49.7% for Ghazal. The party congress also elected Roxane Milot as President, obtaining the support of 98.4% of party members on an uncontested ballot. On 29 April 2024, Lessard-Therrien resigned as co-spokesperson, citing exhaustion. In November 2024, Ghazal became the female co-spokesperson of the party after an uncontested election. On 20 March 2025, days after the 2025 Terrebonne provincial by-election, Nadeau-Dubois resigned as male co-spokesperson and announced that he would not seek re-election in the next general election. Sol Zanetti was elected to succeed him in November 2025.

Ghazal led the party as its candidate for premier in the 2026 Quebec general election, which saw the QS fall to fourth place in the National Assembly and win 9 seats.

== Ideology ==
The aim of QS's foundation was to unify the sovereigntist political left of the political spectrum in Quebec by merging the Union des forces progressistes (UFP) party with the Option citoyenne social movement. In addition to advocating the independence of Quebec from Canada, the party's platform identifies with the concepts of environmentalism, feminism, social justice, proportional representation and participatory democracy, pacifism, aboriginal rights, and alter-globalism. The party also favours immigration, human dignity, and opposes discrimination including racism, sexism, and homophobia. QS describes itself as a sovereigntist, green, alter-globalizationist, and feminist party. As of 2026, it is the most left-wing of the four parties represented in the National Assembly.

At the party's founding, the congress unanimously adopted a document called the Déclaration de principes (declaration of principles) which laid out the principles and values that led the two organizations to merge. The declaration of principles does not specifically endorse social democracy or socialism, although it includes certain activists and tendencies that do. The document declared:

- "Nous sommes écologistes" ("We are environmentalists")
- "Nous sommes de gauche" ("We are on the Left")
- "Nous sommes démocrates" ("We are democrats")
- "Nous sommes féministes" ("We are feminists")
- "Nous sommes altermondialistes" ("We are alter-globalists")
- "Nous sommes d'un Québec pluriel" ("We are from a plural Quebec")
- "Nous sommes d'un Québec souverain et solidaire" ("We are from a sovereign and united Quebec")
- "Un autre parti, pour un autre Québec!" ("Another party, for another Quebec!")

During the 2022 Quebec general election, party spokesman Gabriel Nadeau-Dubois stated that ending food waste in Quebec would be a priority of the party if in government. The party seeks to cut food waste by 50% by mandating large businesses and institutions to give unsold food to groups that would distribute the food, or to businesses that would process the food.

== Structure ==
As with its predecessors, Québec solidaire has no party leader; instead, the party practices collective leadership. The duties generally entrusted to the leader in most other Canadian federal and provincial parties are instead divided among the president, secretary general and two spokespeople. The party leadership is assumed by the National Coordinating Committee, composed of 16 persons elected by the founding congress. A person from the team of volunteers will always have a seat. However, as Quebec's election laws requires the appointment of a leader, the party's secretary general is the de jure party leader recognized by the Chief Electoral Officer of Quebec. The party's statutes call for it to be represented by a male and female co-spokesperson, one of whom serves in the dual role of party president. If one of the spokespeople is a member of the National Assembly, the other spokesperson remains outside of the legislature and holds the party presidency. The national spokespersons have greater visibility than the secretary general and are best known; they are sometimes referred to in the media as the de facto co-leaders of the party. Françoise David and Amir Khadir were the two spokespersons at the party's founding. Alexa Conradi was president from the foundation of the party until June 2009 after which Françoise David was named president-spokeswoman.

The basic unit of the party is the local association. There is a local association for each of the 125 ridings in Quebec. These local associations are grouped into 19 regional associations, whose primary mandate to support the establishment of local associations. In March 2007, Québec solidaire has 61 local associations organized. Students and staff at institutions of higher education are grouped in campus associations that also participate in the democratic life of the party. Two national commissions are also part of the structure of Québec solidaire: the Political Committee and the National Commission for Women. The first is composed of 14 thematic committees and is responsible for proposing a program to members. It was responsible for drafting the electoral platform of the party in general elections of 2007. The National Commission for Women is composed of delegates from each region and is responsible for ensuring that feminism is a value which transverses the party.

Québec solidaire also includes a number of collectives, made up of members in good standing who may, in compliance with requirements, promote their respective political views within Québec solidaire. Unlike such groups did in the UFP, these groups do not have formal representation in Québec solidaire's Congress, National Council, or other party bodies. Current collectives include:

- Alternative socialiste, the Quebec section of International Socialist Alternative.
- Décroissance conviviale, a collective which promotes degrowth.
- Gauche Socialiste, the Quebec section of the reunified Fourth International.
- Laïcité, a collective which promotes the separation of church and state.
- Mass critique, an anti-capitalist collective.
- Socialisme Internationale, the Quebec membership of the International Socialists.
- Tendance Marxiste Internationale, the Quebec section of the International Marxist Tendency.
- Option nationale, formerly active as a separate electoral party from 2011 to 2017.

The Parti Communiste du Québec – Parti Communiste du Canada (PCQ-PCC) left QS following Québec solidaire's merger with Option nationale in 2017.

The party is not affiliated with Canada's federal social democratic party, the New Democratic Party (NDP). However, some QS members are affiliated with the NDP, most notably Alexandre Boulerice.

== Party leadership ==
=== Female co-spokespersons ===
- Françoise David (4 February 2006 – 19 January 2017)
- Manon Massé (19 January 2017 – 26 November 2023; interim until 21 May 2017)
- Émilise Lessard-Therrien (26 November 2023 – 29 April 2024)
- Christine Labrie (2 May 2024 – 16 November 2024; interim)
- Ruba Ghazal (16 November 2024 – present)

=== Male co-spokespersons ===
- Amir Khadir (4 February 2006 – 2 December 2012)
- André Frappier (2 December 2012 – 5 May 2013; interim)
- Andrés Fontecilla (5 May 2013 – 21 May 2017)
- Gabriel Nadeau-Dubois (21 May 2017 – 20 March 2025)
- Guillaume Cliche-Rivard (24 March 2025 – 8 November 2025; interim)
- Sol Zanetti (8 November 2025 – present)

=== Presidents ===
- Alexa Conradi (4 February 2006 – May 2009)
- Françoise David (June 2009 – 2 December 2012)
- André Frappier (2 December 2012 – 5 May 2013; interim)
- Andrés Fontecilla (5 May 2013 – 21 May 2017)
- Nika Deslauriers (21 May 2017 – 21 November 2021)
- Alejandra Zaga Mendez (21 November 2021 – 3 October 2022)
- Nicolas Chatel-Launay (3 October 2022 – 26 November 2023; interim)
- Roxane Milot (26 November 2023 – 6 October 2026)
- Emmanuelle Tremblay (6 October 2026 – present; interim)

=== Secretaries general ===
- Danielle Maire (February 2006 – June 2006)
- Régent Séguin (June 2006 – July 2010)
- Bernard Larivière (July 2010 – February 2011)
- Thérèse Hurteau (February 2011 – March 2011)
- Régent Séguin (March 2011 – May 2013)
- Pierre-Paul St-Onge (May 2013 – June 2016)
- Gaétan Châteauneuf (June 2016 – November 2020)
- Nicolas Chatel-Launay (November 2020 – August 2024)
- Benjamin Gingras (August 2024 – November 2024)
- Carmen Palardy (November 2024 – present)

== Current and former Members of the National Assembly ==
MNA	District	Region	Years of service within caucus
Haroun Bouazzi	Maurice-Richard	Montreal	2022–2026
Alexandre Boulerice	Gouin	Montreal	2026–present
Guillaume Cliche-Rivard	Saint-Henri–Sainte-Anne	Montreal	2023–2026
Françoise David	Gouin	Montreal	2012–2017
Catherine Dorion	Taschereau	Capitale-Nationale	2018–2022
Andrés Fontecilla	Laurier-Dorion	Montreal	2018–present
Ruba Ghazal	Mercier	Montreal	2018–present
Étienne Grandmont	Taschereau	Capitale-Nationale	2022–present
Amir Khadir	Mercier	Montreal	2008–2018
Christine Labrie	Sherbrooke	Estrie	2018–2026
Alexandre Leduc	Hochelaga-Maisonneuve	Montreal	2018–present
Émilise Lessard-Therrien	Rouyn-Noranda–Témiscamingue	Abitibi-Témiscamingue	2018–2022
Vincent Marissal	Rosemont	Montreal	2018–2025
Manon Massé	Sainte-Marie–Saint-Jacques	Montreal	2014–2026
Roxane Milot	Sainte-Marie–Saint-Jacques	Montreal	2026–present
Gabriel Nadeau-Dubois	Gouin	Montreal	2017–2026
Gisèle Pouhe Njall	Rosemont	Montreal	2026–present
Stéphanie Vachon	Sherbrooke	Estrie	2026–present
Alejandra Zaga Mendez	Verdun	Montreal	2022–2026
Sol Zanetti	Jean-Lesage	Capitale-Nationale	2018–present

== General election results ==
Election	Spokesperson(s)	# of candidates	# of seats won	Change +/-	Votes	% of popular vote	Position
2007	Françoise David and Amir Khadir	123	0 / 125	0	144,418	3.64%	No seats
2008	Françoise David and Amir Khadir	122	1 / 125	▲1	122,618	3.78%	No status
2012	Françoise David and Amir Khadir	124	2 / 125	▲1	263,111	6.03%	No status
2014	Françoise David and Andrés Fontecilla	124	3 / 125	▲1	323,367	7.63%	No status
2018	Manon Massé	125	10 / 125	▲7	648,406	16.08%	Fourth party
2022	Gabriel Nadeau-Dubois	124	11 / 125	▲1	633,414	15.43%	Third party
2026	Ruba Ghazal	127	9 / 127	▼2	532,093	12.42%	Fourth party

== See also ==
- Parti de la démocratie socialiste
- Politics of Quebec
- National Assembly of Quebec
- Political parties in Quebec
