= 1990 Vancouver municipal election =

- November 17, 1990

10 seats in Vancouver City Council
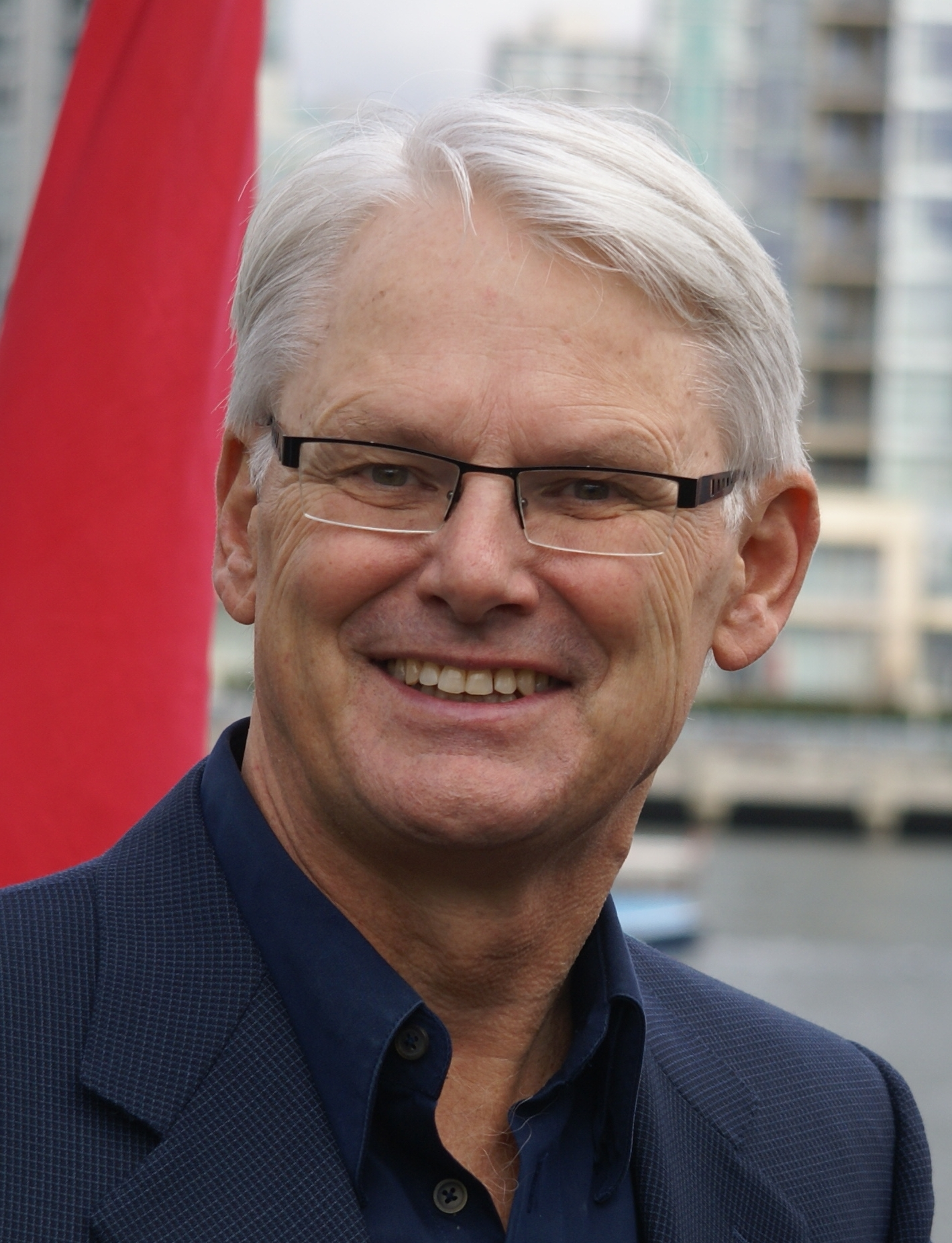

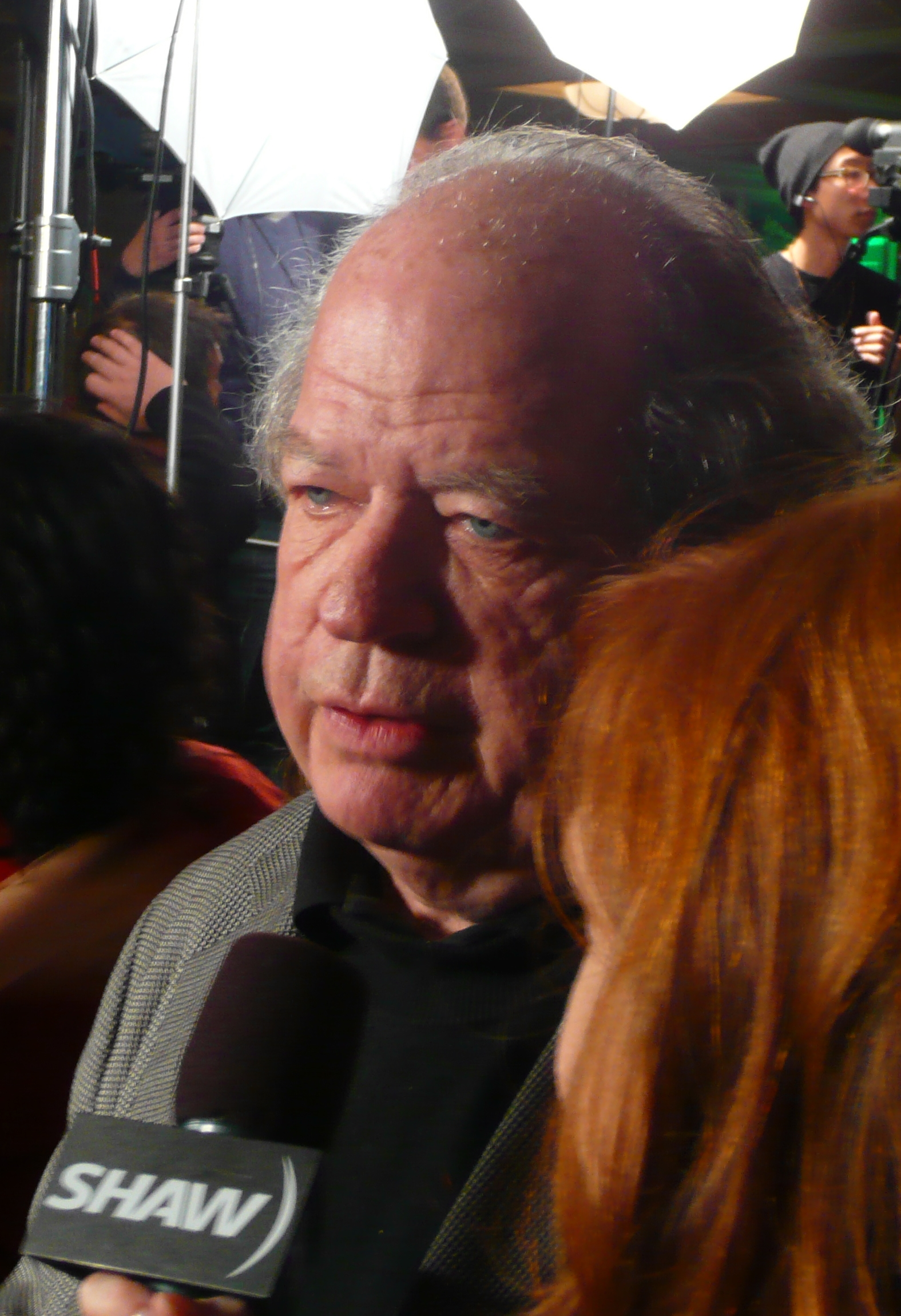
	First party	Second party
Leader	Gordon Campbell	Jim Green
Party	NPA	COPE
Leader since	1986
Last election	7	3
Seats won	5	5
Seat change	▼2	▲2
Popular vote	67,950	56,814
Percentage	53.68%	44.88%
Mayor before election
Gordon Campbell
NPA
Elected mayor
Gordon Campbell
NPA

The city of Vancouver, Canada, held municipal elections on November 17, 1990. Canadian citizens who were over 18 years of age at the time of the vote, and had been a resident of Vancouver for the previous 30 days and a resident of British Columbia for the previous six months, were able to vote for candidates in four races that were presented on one ballot. In addition, Canadian citizen non-resident property owners were eligible to vote. For the first time, the city used the provincial voters list as basis for the city's list of electors. 133,107 out of 257,352 voters cast ballots for a turnout of 52%.

Gordon Campbell of the Non-Partisan Association (NPA) was elected for a third term as mayor. However, NPA's representation on council was reduced, tying with the Coalition of Progressive Electors for five seats each. NPA later regained control of council through a by-election in 1992. This was Campbell's final term as mayor before entering provincial politics as leader of the British Columbia Liberal Party in 1993. Successful candidates were elected for a three-year term.

== Candidates and results ==
Summary of results
Party	Mayor	Council	School	Park
NPA	check	5 / 10	6 / 9	5 / 7
COPE	X mark	5 / 10	2 / 9	2 / 7
NDP		0 / 10	1 / 9	0 / 7

=== Mayor ===
1990 Vancouver municipal election: Mayor
Party	Candidate	Votes	%	Elected
NPA	Gordon Campbell (inc)	67,950	53.68%	✓
COPE	Jim Green	56,814	44.88%	
Independent	Guy Wera	1,231	0.97%	
Independent	Nancy Walker	587	0.46%	
Total		126,582		
Source: Vancouver Sun

=== City council ===
1990 Vancouver municipal election: Councillors
Party	Candidate	Votes	Elected
COPE	Libby Davies (inc)	69,276	✓
COPE	Harry Rankin (inc)	62,208	✓
COPE	Bruce Eriksen (inc)	59,131	✓
NPA	Don Bellamy (inc)	55,499	✓
NPA	Philip Owen	55,112	✓
NPA	George Puil (inc)	55,095	✓
COPE	Bruce Yorke (Note: Bruce Yorke (COPE) resigned in 1992 and was replaced through a by-election by Lynne Kennedy (NPA).)	51,800	✓
NPA	Tung Chan	51,085	✓
COPE	Patricia Wilson	50,844	✓
NPA	Gordon Price	50,719	✓
NDP	David Levi	49,968	
NPA	Lynne Kennedy	48,685	
NPA	Roberta Beiser	45,445	
NPA	Elizabeth Ball	45,183	
	Jonathan Baker (inc) (Note: Formerly NPA, failed to secure nomination)	45,045	
	Sandra Bruneau	43,467	
NPA	Gillian Watson-Donald	39,801	
	Mel Lehan	38,864	
NPA	Alan White	38,094	
	Merrilee Robson	36,664	
	Ian Reid	34,597	
	Jack Volrich	19,204	
	Gavin Ross	16,737	
	Alan Clapp	13,225	
	Stephen Brown	12,854	
	John Jeffery	9,748	
	Thomas Tsang	9,647	
	Jory Faibish	9,209	
	Don West	8,023	
	Cowboy Ellis	7,538	
	Larry Leaf	7,117	
	John Milligan	6,199	
	Richard Nantel	4,458	
	Robert Demorest	2,299	
	Fred Nelson	2,293	
	Antonio Di Felice	2,107	
	Ned Dmytryshyn	1,961	
Source: Vancouver Sun

=== School board ===
1990 Vancouver municipal election: School trustees
Party	Candidate	Votes	Elected
NPA	Ken Denike (inc)	63,541	✓
COPE	Gary Onstad	59,675	✓
NDP	Anne Beer (inc)	59,301	✓
NPA	Craig Hemer (inc)	55,559	✓
NPA	Bill Bruneau	55,188	✓
NPA	Ian Kelsey (inc)	54,982	✓
NPA	Bill Brown (inc)	54,562	✓
COPE	Ruth Herman	54,053	✓
NPA	John Cheng	53,323	✓
COPE	Patricia Chauncey	53,123	
COPE	Jean McCutcheon	52,930	
NPA	Carol McRae (inc)	52,628	
NPA	Harkirpal Sara (inc)	51,959	
COPE	Susanne Dahlin	51,911	
NPA	Marina Navin (inc)	50,757	
COPE	Alayne Keough	49,490	
NPA	Rod Raglin	46,350	
	Norm Gludovatz	41,325	
	Anton Kolstee	25,860	
Source: Vancouver Sun

=== Park board commissioners ===
1990 Vancouver municipal election: Park board commissioners
Party	Candidate	Votes	Elected
NPA	Art Cowie (inc)	55,599	✓
COPE	Dermot Foley	52,462	✓
COPE	Tim Louis	49,459	✓
NPA	Malcolm Ashford (inc)	48,451	✓
NPA	Gerry Thorne	47,004	✓
NPA	Nancy Chiavario (inc)	46,690	✓
NPA	Jean Porteous	46,413	✓
	Alvin Lee	46,252	
	Charlotte Beresford	43,653	
	Christopher Richardson	41,586	
	Janice LeClerc	40,902	
COPE	Mike Chrunik	40,622	
	Walt Lawrence	39,777	
	Elizabeth Anderson	33,515	
	Essop Mia	33,143	
	George Wainborn (inc)	30,824	
	Allan Bennett (inc)	23,786	
	Bernie Stroh	13,878	
	Paul Mitchell	12,628	
	Bob Thompson	11,217	
	Rand Irwin	10,692	
	Duff Scott	9,565	
	Murrey Rabinovitch	7,106	
	Michael Robson	6,120	
	Rolly Skov	3,372	
Source: Vancouver Sun

== Referendums ==
A number of referendums were included on the ballot. Vancouver voters approved new funds for a new main library, parks and recreation facilities and public works, but rejected an initiative seeking $500,000 to build a new otter habitat at the Stanley Park zoo.

Referendum	Yes	No	Outcome
Street capital plan	87,268	32,514	check
Library capital plan	82,549	37,308	check
Parks capital plan	80,393	38,612	check
Stanley Park zoo redevelopment	55,632	63,424	X mark
Opposition to GST	17,836	98,503	check
