= Libby Davies =

Canadian politician

Libby Davies CM
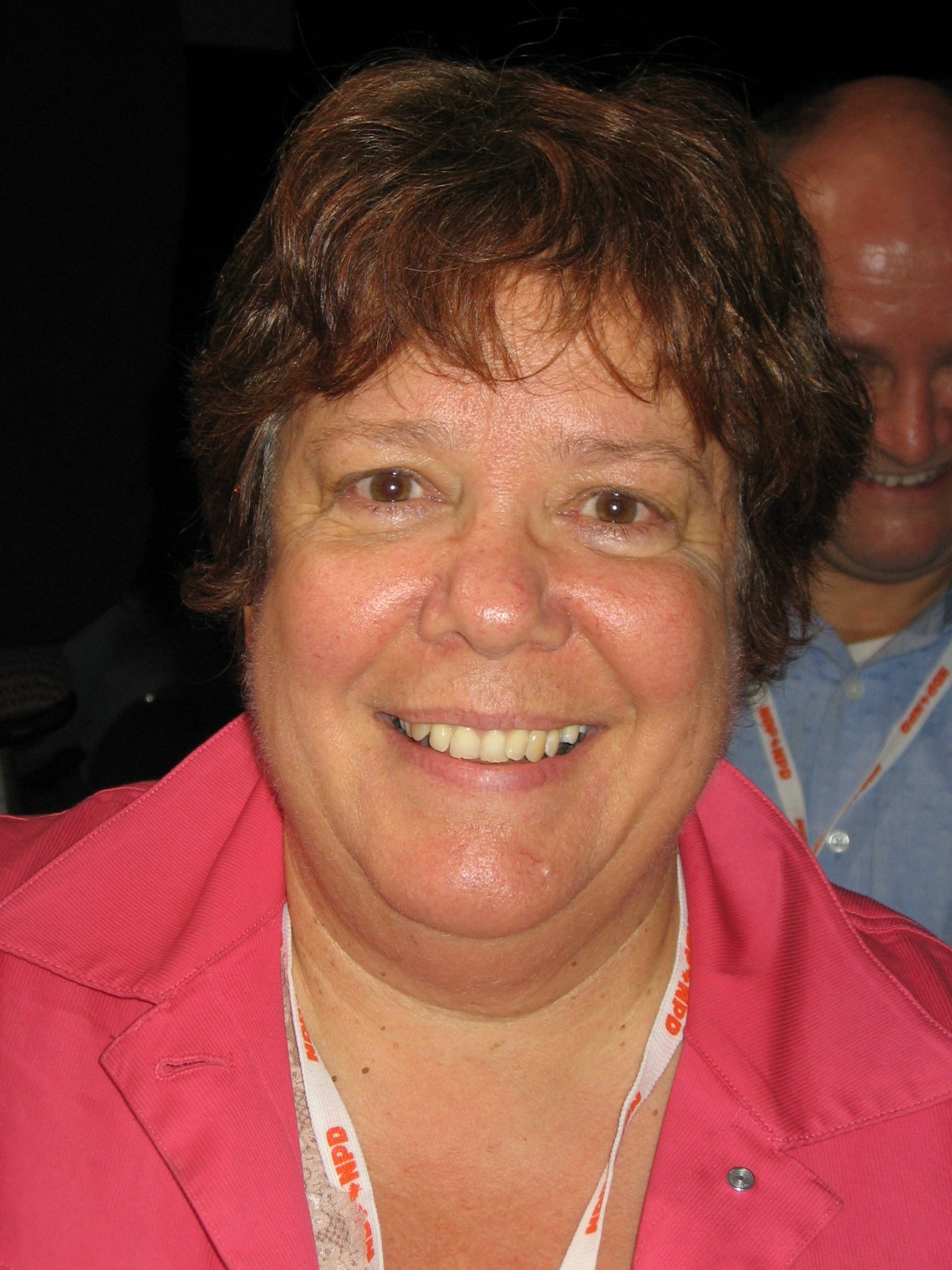
- Davies at the 2006 New Democratic Party federal convention in Quebec City

Vice president of the New Democratic Party
- Incumbent
- Assumed office March 28, 2026
- Leader: Avi Lewis
- Preceded by: Laurie Antonin

Deputy leader of the New Democratic Party
- In office September 27, 2007 – October 18, 2015 Serving with Thomas Mulcair until 2011, then Megan Leslie and David Christopherson from 2012 to 2015
- Leader: Jack Layton; Thomas Mulcair
- Preceded by: Bill Blaikie
- Succeeded by: David Christopherson

Shadow Minister for Health
- In office May 26, 2011 – January 22, 2015
- Leader: Jack Layton; Nycole Turmel; Thomas Mulcair
- Preceded by: Ujjal Dosanjh
- Succeeded by: Murray Rankin

Member of Parliament for Vancouver East
- In office June 2, 1997 – October 19, 2015
- Preceded by: Anna Terrana
- Succeeded by: Jenny Kwan

Member of the Vancouver City Council
- In office 1982–1993

Personal details
- Born: February 27, 1953 (age 73) Aldershot, Hampshire, England
- Citizenship: Canadian and British
- Party: New Democratic
- Other political affiliations: COPE
- Domestic partner(s): Bruce Eriksen (common-law spouse; c. 1973–1997, his death); Kimberly Elliott (present)
- Occupation: Human resources coordinator
- Website: www.libbydavies.ca

Libby Davies CM (born February 27, 1953) is a Canadian politician from British Columbia. She was the member of Parliament for Vancouver East from 1997 to 2015, House leader for the New Democratic Party (NDP) from 2003 to 2011, and deputy leader of the party from 2007 until 2015 (alongside Thomas Mulcair under the leadership of Jack Layton and alongside Megan Leslie and David Christopherson after Mulcair became leader in 2012). Prior to entering federal politics, Davies helped found the Downtown Eastside Residents Association and served as a Vancouver city councillor from 1982 to 1993.

== Early life and career ==
Davies was born in Aldershot, United Kingdom, on February 27, 1953, and immigrated to Canada in 1968 with her family. She moved to Vancouver, British Columbia, in 1969. Before being elected to the Parliament of Canada, she participated in many grass-roots political organizations in the Downtown Eastside area of Vancouver. She dropped out of university to help Bruce Eriksen found the Downtown Eastside Residents Association (DERA), an influential low-income housing advocacy group. She was instrumental in a campaign to save the Carnegie library, which was later converted into the Carnegie Community Centre serving low-income adults. From 1994 to 1997 Davies was employed by the Hospital Employees' Union.

For 24 years, Davies lived in a common-law relationship with Vancouver city councillor Bruce Eriksen, who died of cancer in 1997. They had a son, Lief. In 2001, Davies became the first female Canadian member of Parliament to reveal that she was in a same-sex relationship.

== Political career ==
=== Municipal politics ===
Davies' first experience in politics was serving on the Vancouver Parks Board for one term, 1980–82. She was elected to Vancouver City Council as a member of the Coalition of Progressive Electors (COPE) in 1982 and was re-elected in 1984, 1986, 1988, and 1990. She ran for Mayor of Vancouver with the backing of COPE in 1993, losing to Philip Owen.

=== Federal politics ===
Davies was first elected to parliament in 1997 and re-elected in 2000, 2004, 2006 and 2008 and 2011. Previously the NDP house leader and spokesperson for housing, homelessness and multiculturalism, she became the health critic in the shadow cabinet of Jack Layton upon the NDP's ascent to Official Opposition status. In parliament, she was a strong supporter of drug policy reform, specifically to halt the criminalization of drug users.

In 2005, during the parliamentary debate on same-sex marriage in Canada, Conservative MP Jason Kenney cited Davies' prior relationship with Eriksen as proof that marriage law does not discriminate against LGBT individuals, since a gay person can marry a member of the opposite sex. Davies, who was never formally married to Eriksen, joined other commentators in criticizing Kenney for playing politics with other parliamentarians' personal lives.

In December 2007, Davies received the Justice Gerald Le Dain Award for Achievement in the Field of Law. She was recognized for her "outstanding drug policy reform work" at the 2007 International Drug Policy Reform Conference, hosted by the Drug Policy Alliance and the Criminal Justice Policy Foundation.

In 2009, she was interviewed for the Beyond Gay: The Politics of Pride documentary on Gay Pride celebrations internationally.

Davies faced accusations of antisemitism stemming from a June 5, 2010, interview in which she suggested that Israel has been occupied territory since 1948. She was criticized for her comments the next day in an Ottawa Citizen editorial. She responded to these criticisms in a letter to the Citizen, which was also posted on Davies' constituency website.

In 2011, it was announced that Davies would serve as health critic for the Official Opposition Shadow Cabinet, while continuing to serve in her role as deputy leader of the NDP.

Davies declined to stand as a candidate for the leadership of the New Democratic Party in 2012, citing her inability to speak French as a factor.

On December 12, 2014, Davies announced that she would retire from parliament at the 2015 general election after 18 years as a member of Parliament.

=== Post-politics ===
In December 2016, Davies was named a member of the Order of Canada. In 2019, she published the memoir Outside In: A Political Memoir.

Davies endorsed Avi Lewis in the 2026 New Democratic Party leadership election, and was elected vice president of the party in March 2026.

== Electoral record ==
=== Federal ===
2011 Canadian federal election: Vancouver East
| Party | Candidate | Votes | % | ±% |
|---|---|---|---|---|
| New Democratic | Libby Davies | 27,794 | 62.83 | +8.41 |
| Conservative | Irene Yatco | 8,361 | 18.90 | +3.37 |
| Liberal | Roma Ahi | 4,382 | 9.91 | −7.32 |
| Green | Douglas Roy | 3,383 | 7.65 | −3.73 |
| Marxist–Leninist | Anne Jamieson | 318 | 0.72 | +0.31 |
| Total valid votes | | 44,238 | 100.0 | |
| Total rejected ballots | | 275 | 0.62 | +0.03 |
| Turnout | | 44,513 | 56.21 | +2 |
| Eligible voters | | 79,184 | | |
| New Democratic hold | | Swing | | +2.52 |

2008 Canadian federal election: Vancouver East
| Party | Candidate | Votes | % | ±% | Expenditures |
|---|---|---|---|---|---|
| New Democratic | Libby Davies | 22,506 | 54.42 | −2.15 | $72,187 |
| Liberal | Ken Low | 7,127 | 17.23 | −6.19 | $80,088 |
| Conservative | Ryan Warawa | 6,422 | 15.53 | +2.22 | $45,821 |
| Green | Mike Carr | 4,708 | 11.38 | +5.38 | $2,396 |
| Work Less | Betty Krawczyk | 423 | 1.02 | — | |
| Marxist–Leninist | Anne Jamieson | 171 | 0.41 | — | |
| Total valid votes/Expense limit | | 41,357 | 100.0 | | $83,047 |
| Total rejected ballots | | 270 | 0.65 | +0.18 | |
| Turnout | | 41,639 | 54 | −2.4 | |
| New Democratic hold | | Swing | | +2.02 | |

2006 Canadian federal election
| Party | Candidate | Votes | % | ±% | Expenditures |
|---|---|---|---|---|---|
| New Democratic | Libby Davies | 23,927 | 56.57 | +0.11 | $75,177 |
| Liberal | Dave Haggard | 9,907 | 23.42 | −2.50 | $22,205 |
| Conservative | Elizabeth M. Pagtakhan | 5,631 | 13.31 | +3.32 | $76,377 |
| Green | Christine Ellis | 2,536 | 6.00 | +0.31 | $156 |
| Canadian Action | Bryce Bartholomew | 293 | 0.69 | — | $200 |
| Total valid votes | | 42,294 | 100.0 | | |
| Total rejected ballots | | 200 | 0.47 | −0.26 | |
| Turnout | | 42,494 | 56.4 | −1.76 | |
| New Democratic hold | | Swing | | +1.30 | |

2004 Canadian federal election
| Party | Candidate | Votes | % | ±% | Expenditures |
|---|---|---|---|---|---|
| New Democratic | Libby Davies | 23,452 | 56.46 | +14.19 | $64,940 |
| Liberal | Shirley Chan | 10,768 | 25.92 | −7.81 | |
| Conservative | Harvey Grigg | 4,153 | 9.99 | −7.53 | $44,993 |
| Green | Ron Plowright | 2,365 | 5.69 | +3.24 | $1,157 |
| Marijuana | Marc Boyer | 399 | 0.96 | −0.85 | |
| Christian Heritage | Gloria Anne Kieler | 250 | 0.60 | +0.25 | |
| Independent | Louis James Lesosky | 147 | 0.35 | — | |
| Total valid votes | | 41,534 | 100.0 | | |
| Total rejected ballots | | 305 | 0.73 | 0.73 | −0.37 |
| Turnout | | 41,839 | 58.16 | +2.28 | |
| New Democratic hold | | Swing | | +11.00 | |
Conservative vote is compared to the total of the Canadian Alliance and Progressive Conservative vote in the 2000 election.

2000 Canadian federal election
| Party | Candidate | Votes | % | ±% | Expenditures |
|---|---|---|---|---|---|
| New Democratic | Libby Davies | 16,818 | 42.27 | +0.02 | $56,481 |
| Liberal | Mason Loh | 13,421 | 33.73 | −3.33 | $58,199 |
| Alliance | Sal Vetro | 5,536 | 13.91 | +1.81 | $14,808 |
| Progressive Conservative | Michael Walsh | 1,439 | 3.61 | +0.89 | $7,603 |
| Green | Kelly Elizabeth White | 975 | 2.45 | −0.99 | $177 |
| Marijuana | David Malmo-Levine | 724 | 1.81 | — | |
| Canadian Action | Brian Bacon | 432 | 1.08 | — | $2,648 |
| Independent | Edna Mathilda Brass | 196 | 0.49 | — | |
| Independent | Gloria Anne Kieler | 143 | 0.35 | −0.28 | |
| Natural Law | Rosemary F. Galte | 97 | 0.24 | — | |
| Total valid votes | | 39,781 | 100.0 | | |
| Total rejected ballots | | 444 | 1.10 | −0.03 | |
| Turnout | | 40,225 | 55.88 | −4.00 | |
| New Democratic hold | | Swing | | +1.68 | |
Canadian Alliance vote is compared to the Reform Party vote in the 1997 election.

1997 Canadian federal election
| Party | Candidate | Votes | % | ±% | Expenditures |
|---|---|---|---|---|---|
| New Democratic | Libby Davies | 14,961 | 42.25 | +11.22 | $52,043 |
| Liberal | Anna Terrana | 13,123 | 37.06 | +1.00 | $52,663 |
| Reform | Keith Mitchell | 4,287 | 12.10 | +0.16 | $11,525 |
| Green | Stuart Parker | 1,221 | 3.44 | +1.99 | $2,871 |
| Progressive Conservative | Jerry Cikes | 964 | 2.72 | −6.10 | $5,167 |
| Christian Heritage | Gloria Kieler | 226 | 0.63 | — | $844 |
| Natural Law | Wayne Melvin | 185 | 0.52 | −0.45 | |
| Independent | Kimball Cariou | 161 | 0.45 | −0.41 | $5,097 |
| Marxist–Leninist | Charles Boylan | 158 | 0.44 | +0.23 | |
| Independent | Ryan Bloc Québécois Bigge | 121 | 0.34 | — | |
| Total valid votes | | 35,407 | 100.0 | | |
| Total rejected ballots | | 403 | 1.13 | | |
| Turnout | | 35,810 | 59.88 | | |
| New Democratic gain from Liberal | | Swing | | +5.11 | |

=== Municipal ===
1993 Vancouver municipal election: Vancouver mayor
| Party | Candidate | Votes | % | Elected |
|---|---|---|---|---|
| NPA | Philip Owen | 46,687 | 50.03% | ✓ |
| COPE | Libby Davies | 37,812 | 40.52% | |
| Independent | Bob Seeman | 4,834 | 5.18% | |
| Independent | Jonathan Himsworth | 683 | 0.73% | |
| Independent | Stu Campbell | 581 | 0.62% | |
| Independent | The Captain | 403 | 0.43% | |
| Independent | Angus Ian Macdonald | 317 | 0.34% | |
| Independent | Brian G. Salmi | 259 | 0.28% | |
| Independent | Shane McCune | 234 | 0.25% | |
| Independent | Sandy Beach | 207 | 0.22% | |
| Independent | Helder J. Fernandes | 157 | 0.17% | |
| Independent | Jeremy Price | 148 | 0.16% | |
| Independent | Marion Drakos | 148 | 0.16% | |
| Independent | Terry K. Dunne | 147 | 0.16% | |
| Independent | Matthew A. Martin | 111 | 0.12% | |
| Independent | Wretched Ethyl | 110 | 0.12% | |
| Independent | Arne Hansen | 109 | 0.12% | |
| Independent | Ari Benbasat | 109 | 0.12% | |
| Independent | Mike Chivilo | 102 | 0.11% | |
| Independent | Rojer Streets | 43 | 0.05% | |
| Independent | Jonathan Hagey | 41 | 0.04% | |
| Independent | Sean Veley | 35 | 0.04% | |
| Independent | Evan Ozirny | 33 | 0.04% | |

1990 Vancouver municipal election: Councillors
| Party | Candidate | Votes | Elected |
|---|---|---|---|
| COPE | Libby Davies (inc) | 69,276 | ✓ |
| COPE | Harry Rankin (inc) | 62,208 | ✓ |
| COPE | Bruce Eriksen (inc) | 59,131 | ✓ |
| NPA | Don Bellamy (inc) | 55,499 | ✓ |
| NPA | Philip Owen | 55,112 | ✓ |
| NPA | George Puil (inc) | 55,095 | ✓ |
| COPE | Bruce Yorke (Note: Bruce Yorke (COPE) resigned in 1992 and was replaced through a by-election by Lynne Kennedy (NPA).) | 51,800 | ✓ |
| NPA | Tung Chan | 51,085 | ✓ |
| COPE | Patricia Wilson | 50,844 | ✓ |
| NPA | Gordon Price | 50,719 | ✓ |
| NDP | David Levi | 49,968 | |
| NPA | Lynne Kennedy | 48,685 | |
| NPA | Roberta Beiser | 45,445 | |
| NPA | Elizabeth Ball | 45,183 | |
| | Jonathan Baker (inc) (Note: Formerly NPA, failed to secure nomination) | 45,045 | |
| | Sandra Bruneau | 43,467 | |
| NPA | Gillian Watson-Donald | 39,801 | |
| | Mel Lehan | 38,864 | |
| NPA | Alan White | 38,094 | |
| | Merrilee Robson | 36,664 | |
| | Ian Reid | 34,597 | |
| | Jack Volrich | 19,204 | |
| | Gavin Ross | 16,737 | |
| | Alan Clapp | 13,225 | |
| | Stephen Brown | 12,854 | |
| | John Jeffery | 9,748 | |
| | Thomas Tsang | 9,647 | |
| | Jory Faibish | 9,209 | |
| | Don West | 8,023 | |
| | Cowboy Ellis | 7,538 | |
| | Larry Leaf | 7,117 | |
| | John Milligan | 6,199 | |
| | Richard Nantel | 4,458 | |
| | Robert Demorest | 2,299 | |
| | Fred Nelson | 2,293 | |
| | Antonio Di Felice | 2,107 | |
| | Ned Dmytryshyn | 1,961 | |
Source: Vancouver Sun
