= The Electors' Action Movement =

Defunct municipal political party in Vancouver, Canada

- Defunct municipal party
- Leader: Art Phillips
- Founded: 1968
- Dissolved: c. 1986
- Headquarters: Vancouver
- Ideology: Reformism; Green politics; Participatory democracy
- Political position: Centre
- Colours: Pink

The Electors' Action Movement (TEAM) was a centrist political party from 1968 to the mid-1980s at the municipal level in Vancouver, British Columbia, Canada. It fielded candidates for the office of mayor as well as for positions on the City Council, School Board, and Park Board. It was most successful in the 1970s when it held the majority of council seats from 1972 to 1976.

Retrospective accounts of TEAM have painted it as distinctly shifting civic governance in Vancouver when it gained power. Rod Mickleburgh of The Globe and Mail wrote in 2013 that TEAM's Art Phillips' four years as mayor "were pivotal in changing the face of Canada's third largest city, just when it seemed to be headed for pell-mell, American-style development that was ruining so many cities south of the border". May Brown, one of the original TEAM members who represented the party on council for ten years, told Pat Johnson of the Vancouver Courier in 1999 that "TEAM radically altered the face of city government".

== Creation ==
The catalyst for the creation of TEAM was a proposal to build a freeway through historic Chinatown. At the time, power at City Hall was not in the hands of the elected mayor and aldermen, but in those of two appointed city commissioners. In 1959, one of the commissioners, chief planner Gerald Sutton-Brown, generated a city plan that former TEAM alderman and transportation engineer Setty Pendakur described as "completely automobile and freeway oriented".

While such freeways were being built in major cities throughout North America at that time, in Vancouver, opposition grew as the plans progressed. By the fourth quarter of 1967, a public hearing on how the route was chosen turned into one of the "wildest, most stormy meetings ever seen at city hall", wrote The Province's Bud Elsie. The nearly 500 people who attended, most of whom were opposed to freeways, turned it into a networking opportunity, "and, with their vest pocket diaries in hand, eagerly arranged to meet again for further discussion". Those further discussions led to the formation of a political movement that in just nine months would develop policies and attract candidates to run for every position in the next civic election.

TEAM came into being at a public meeting held at Vancouver's Grandview Community Centre on March 12, 1968. The founding president was Phillips, the head of a successful Vancouver investment firm; first and second vice-presidents were broadcasting executive Bill Bellman and labour leader Ed Lawson. Also on the founding executive committee were hotelier Frank Bernard; UBC history of medicine professor W. C. Gibson; Citizens' Housing Council president Alice Moore; head of UBC's department of community and regional planning; Peter Oberlander; UBC geography professor Walter Hardwick; businessman Charles Jordan-Knox; lawyer Haig Farris; and West Vancouver councillor Donald Lanskail.

In less than five years' time, TEAM would be in a position to shift the power balance at City Hall and implement the policies for which the electors had voted.

== Policies and platform ==
TEAM sought to be a moderate reform group committed to democratic principles, appealing to people of all political leanings. Its candidates would be tied to policies determined by the general membership. In contrast, the ruling Non-Partisan Association endorsed individuals, but not policies. Oberlander described TEAM as the first civic party to run on a platform and with a caucus on council, school board and park board that could coordinate coherent policy.

Within a month of the founding meeting, about 150 people met at the Waldorf Hotel to set up committees dealing with all aspects of civic life. There were four subcommittees and a special research committee, operating under an over-all policy committee headed by Oberlander and Farris. Oberlander stated, "We want to involve the maximum number of people in the evolution of our policies."

In August 1968, TEAM released its procedure on selection of candidates. Instead of candidates being appointed by the executive board, every eligible nomination would be voted on by the entire membership.

In September, there was a general membership meeting to present, discuss and vote on the policies TEAM would promote. These included:

- creation of a Vancouver Development Authority to plan growth in the city core and particularly False Creek and the downtown waterfront
- outside of the downtown core, planned commercial and residential districts, each with its own "core"
- a "parks for people" program aimed at securing park land for future generations
- greater involvement in regional municipal government
- a mayoral executive committee to oversee city management and "give the government back to the elected representatives".
- an expanded city council with some aldermen elected at large and others by district

Political opponents criticized the latter as a step backwards to the patronage and cronyism of ward systems past. But Phillips said TEAM had never used the word "ward" and instead was advocating a system of partial area representation. He said Vancouver was the only major city in Canada that elected all its aldermen at large, so this proposal was hardly revolutionary. Partial area representation would mean fewer names on the ballot and district aldermen "would be available to perform the ombudsman function which is so important if we are to counteract the feeling of alienation that exists all over this city". He added that the district aldermen would ensure points of view from all parts of the city would be represented on council, while the at-large aldermen meant a balance would always exist between neighbourhood and city-wide concerns.

== First civic election: limited success in 1968 ==
Running under the TEAM banner, Burnaby mayor Alan Emmott lost to NPA incumbent Tom Campbell, who received fifty percent more votes. Hardwick and Phillips took two of ten council seats, with Phillips moving up from eleventh spot after a recount. For school board, Oberlander topped the polls, while Fritz Bowers and Peter Bullen also won seats. Helen Boyce was elected to the park board. In the aftermath, a Province analysis suggested TEAM had made a tactical error in choosing an outsider as its mayoral candidate. And The Vancouver Sun wrote that Hardwick, "while pleased about his own win, said the people were 'obviously not ready' for the TEAM concept. 'It is an organization 40 years ahead of its time.'"

In their first year on council, Phillips and Hardwick were vocal about the need for change. At a TEAM meeting, Phillips cited the lease of land to the Pacific National Exhibition and lack of development in False Creek as "glaring examples of stupid management policies". Hardwick promoted False Creek as a major residential, recreational and service area in the future, complaining that "some aldermen can't see anything in False Creek except industry".

The two were busy. Phillips succeeded in a motion to have the planning department investigate rezoning the 1000 block of Robson Street for a high-rise apartment district with two levels of pedestrian-oriented shopping malls. Hardwick proposed changes to the city charter to allow for elections earlier in the autumn, and for ballots to include candidates' names in non-alphabetical order, along with political affiliations. With NPA alderman Brian Calder, who often voted with them, they did a helicopter tour of the city to check out air pollution.

By early 1970, Phillips and Hardwick had made an impact. Province columnist Lorne Parton wrote that their record "has given the movement respectability and credibility". And the left-leaning Committee of Progressive Electors (COPE), criticized the news media for "playing down news on city political organizations other than the one they supported, TEAM".

During the year, park board commissioner Boyce left TEAM to join the NPA and Calder joined TEAM. With the election approaching, TEAM chose William C. Gibson as its mayoral candidate and endorsed a full slate for city council, including Calder, Hardwick and Phillips. The sitting school trustees were nominated along with six others, and there was a full park board slate.

Candidates for city council said they were united by "a common concern for the quality of life in Vancouver" and cited as accomplishments the halt to the downtown freeway and progress toward development of False Creek. Park board candidates promised a complete review of the operations of the Park Board and greater control of pollution. School board candidates pledged to promote students' choice in schools and programs, and greater autonomy for students as they aged.

== 1970: Same number of seats but other gains ==
Gibson did not defeat the incumbent mayor Tom Campbell, but closed the gap significantly compared with the 1968 result. TEAM's three sitting aldermen were re-elected, this time placing in the top five. TEAM elected three school trustees; a fourth almost made it but an NPA candidate eventually took the spot. Art Cowie was elected to the park board.

Campbell began his third term by placing himself and his six NPA aldermen in ten choice appointments to committees and boards. Hardwick said TEAM had tried to avoid an opposition role on council "but Campbell has obviously decided to run the body on partisan political lines".

However, the NPA's subsequent behaviour on council opened opportunities for TEAM. When three NPA aldermen did not attend a public meeting where citizens presented briefs in favour of parks for people, not cars, the TEAM–COPE bloc reversed an earlier council decision to proceed with plans for a six-lane road through what would become Jericho park. Campbell himself was frequently absent, and the structure and functioning of council itself came under question. All three TEAM aldermen filled in for Campbell when he was away, and a Province story described how Phillips spent his time in the mayor's office "priming an engine that had practically ceased to function. Phillips brought action on urban renewal, Jericho land proposals and scores of minor matters during his brief tenure."

During this period, TEAM raised many questions about the way the city and the electoral system ran. It proposed a larger council with an executive group chosen from its ranks that would take full-time responsibility for governing; evening meetings so more citizens could attend; cash deposits for civic candidates, and the elimination of voting privileges for corporations. Calder, who had proposed the council restructuring, quit the Town Planning Commission, dismissing it as a toothless body used to pasture off defeated NPA candidates. He suggested it should instead be a non-political body transmitting public opinions on planning matters to council.

In announcing his candidacy for mayor in the 1972 election, Phillips "said the first priority of his administration would be to make 'livability' the top planning objective in Vancouver. He said the practice of seeking development for development's sake has got to end."

As the election approached, Phillips' star was in the ascendant. In an August profile, The Vancouver Sun's Lisa Hobbs wrote: "Being in charge is not only something Phillips is good at but is something he revels in. No trace of a hang-up, philosophical or psychological, mitigates his delight in being boss." In accepting TEAM's mayoral nomination in October, Phillips said, "Citizen action won some big battles in the last few years against bulldozers and freeways and shopping centres but they won the hard way. They had to fight city hall. I want people to feel that the city government is there to serve them, not to rule them." TEAM nominated candidates for every position and encouraged electors to vote for its whole slate.

== 1972: Landslide ==
On December 13, voters preferred Phillips as mayor by a factor of nearly six to one. TEAM elected eight aldermen to the ten-seat council, with Hardwick topping the polls. The others were lawyer Michael Harcourt, physician William Gibson, architect Geoffrey Massey, lawyer Jack Volrich, engineer Fritz Bowers, social worker/community planner Darlene Marzari and engineer and planner Setty Pendakur. TEAM would control the school board, with eight of nine trustees, and the park board, with four commissioners to the NPA's three. Pendakur was the first South Asian to be elected alderman, and new school trustee Jack Say Yee was the first Chinese-Canadian to be elected to civic office in Vancouver.

UBC political scientist Paul Tennant, writing on Vancouver civic politics in BC Studies, described the new council as "the cream of the cream in terms of educational and professional attainment", adding it's likely "that few, if any, other cosmopolitan cities with open elections have ever produced a city council composed so completely of persons of high occupational and social status". He noted that all had university degrees, four were university professors, and on average they were more than a decade younger than the NPA members of the previous council.

Following Phillip's swearing-in as Vancouver's 32nd mayor, The Province noted that it had been five years since TEAM was formed to combat what sponsors felt was aimless civic leadership. "TEAM's drive for power is over; now the work begins." The new council's priorities were listed as: "More consultation with the people of Vancouver on policy; better bus service and, eventually, a rapid transit system; more direct leadership by elected representatives; evening council meetings that more residents can attend; restoration of the committee system that gives each alderman specific responsibilities; new downtown and West End zoning; greater co-operation with the park board in environment matters; a waterfront development study; greater leadership in the Greater Vancouver Regional District.

Control of business at city hall meant a shake-up of the established bureaucracy, and TEAM Council's first move was to encourage the resignation of city commissioner Gerald Sutton-Brown, who had been the strongest proponent of the freeway system. "Sutton Brown's departure stood as a powerful symbol of regime change in the local state. [...] Citizen involvement in planning, a focus on regional planning, and an effort to accommodate downtown living became norms."

There were bumps along the way. Council overruled the recommendations of Hardwick's committee on the topic of underground shopping malls, which the committee opposed for the damage they do to ground-level street life. A couple of weeks later, at its annual meeting, TEAM voted to make it official party policy to ban more downtown underground malls.

At the park board, Cowie was seeking some control over the finances for parks and recreation and complaining that "the new TEAM council is no more receptive to park board matters than the old NPA council". The elected board should do more than rubber-stamp staff proposals, he said. The ensuing conflict led to the abrupt resignation of a long-time bureaucrat, and NPA commissioners blaming Cowie for staff morale plunging to the lowest ebb they said they'd ever seen. Things improved after council approved the expenditure of $11,000 for a management review of the park board, which resulted in a new administrative structure and staff organization. Historian R. Mike Steele wrote that after decades of adversarial relations between the park board and city council, things changed greatly in the two years after the 1972 election. He attributed the greater cooperation to the majority of elected officials from both bodies being "political comrades bent on amending a structure they viewed as unresponsive ... Greater public participation certainly became a feature of park planning."

During its first term the TEAM council implemented much of its policy platform. The freeway proposal was finally killed. Neighbourhood participation in local area planning was encouraged. Granville Mall was planned and completed. A bylaw phased out advertising billboards. Zoning and procedural changes controlled downtown development. New requirements for early public notice and the creation of the Development Permit Board abolished secrecy in the development process. The former industrial area of False Creek was transformed into a residential area under direct development by the city itself. The False Creek plan would be an important legacy, as noted by writer Brian Palmquist fifty years later: "TEAM and the mayor, together with planning staff led by director of planning Ray Spaxman, set at least three key precedents in the planning of False Creek South: the housing mix, the parks, and the waterfront walkway

== 1974: Second majority ==
Phillips was returned to the mayor's chair with a closer vote, receiving 37,220 to his NPA opponent George Puil's 27,686. During the campaign Puil, a long-time park board commissioner, accused TEAM of failing to act on rising crime and vandalism, squandering civic resources, aggravating the housing crisis, making Vancouver a haven for welfare bums and promoting permissiveness in schools. Five TEAM aldermen were elected: Harcourt, Bowers, Volrich, Marzari and Cowie. TEAM elected six school trustees and five park board commissioners, retaining control of both bodies.

Land and housing issues dominated TEAM's second mandate. Council approved a property endowment fund that would "maintain or increase the City's ownership of strategic land", support its planning and development objectives, and produce a reasonable return on its property investments. Phillips' housing priorities were to set policy on secondary suites to maintain quality of neighbourhoods and provide lower-priced rentals while helping families gain equity in their homes, "enough to make living in Vancouver affordable again". He also wanted the city to initiate more seniors' housing.

But housing was always controversial. Council gave final approval for the residential development on the south shore of False Creek against the wishes of those who wanted the area for parkland. In Kitsilano, it approved the demolition of city-owned houses to create waterfront parks despite arguments that the homes should be retained because of the housing shortage. "Mayor Art Phillips who supported the demolitions said the city would probably always have a housing crisis in the future", The Sun reported.

In June 1975, there was a serious rift on TEAM over a proposed co-op that would have doubled the zoned density on a single-family block near UBC. Phillips and Volrich voted with the NPA against it. Marzari, who was a proponent, said she was sad to belong to a reform party that was unaccountable to its members. It was "irrevocably split" on the issue, she said, but she was glad the split "had finally come into the open".

There was dismay in the TEAM ranks. The Sun reported that Phillips and Volrich were asked to justify their "direct contradiction of TEAM's housing policy that a variety of housing styles serving a variety of income levels be available in all areas of the city". By the end of the summer, The Sun was suggesting that Phillips might run for the NPA while Harcourt would be TEAM's pick for mayor in 1976. Two months later, a few days after Marzari quit TEAM to finish her term as an independent, Phillips announced he would not run in 1976, telling reporters he had accomplished most of what he had set out to do and was ready for a return to private life.

In January 1976, Province columnist Nate Smith was pessimistic about TEAM's chances in that fall's election, noting that president Don Bellamy had told a television interviewer that he felt like the "captain of the Titanic". The party's "nebulous document known as 'TEAM policy' is the organization's problem, because at the moment TEAM really has no idea what it stands for", Smith wrote.

Phillips did not attend TEAM's annual general meeting in February. There, Harcourt warned that he'd find it difficult to support the party unless it restored itself as a grassroots movement, and he lamented the loss of TEAM's former energy and excitement and some of its community organizers.

In May, Volrich announced he would run for mayor, with or without TEAM's endorsement. "Volrich said some crucial questions must be faced in the city: How large a population, how much housing and what degree density, how much additional office and commercial space should be allowed."

Harcourt also sought TEAM's mayoral nomination, initially saying that if he failed, he would run for alderman. But when Volrich was chosen, he changed his mind and resigned from the party. A pre-election editorial endorsed Volrich for mayor, noting that while the differences between TEAM and the NPA seem inconsequential, given TEAM's move to the right, TEAM "is more likely to continue the trend to more human proportions in city development", noting its innovations such as Granville Mall, Gastown and the False Creek mixed housing program.

== 1976: Minority council ==
On November 19, Volrich became TEAM's second mayor, doubling the votes of NPA's Ed Sweeney. Successful TEAM alderman candidates were May Brown, Marguerite Ford, Bill Gibson and Don Bellamy. Harcourt and Marzari were elected as independents. TEAM took the first six of nine places on the school board and kept its majority on park board, electing four commissioners.

== 1978 to 1984: Ebbing support ==
TEAM fielded a full slate in the 1978 election, with May Brown as the mayoral hopeful. She was defeated by Volrich who, running as an independent, received a greater percentage of the vote than he had in 1976. Ford won the sole council seat for TEAM, which elected only two school trustees and two park board commissioners.

The 1978 election included a plebiscite on the institution of a ward system, but the 51.7% vote in favour wasn't considered high enough to move ahead. In 1979, council voted to examine alternatives to the at-large system. Harcourt, seconded by Marzari, proposed that council pursue a full ward system. The motion was defeated by Volrich and the NPA majority, along with Ford, who thought it too vague.

By the end of 1979, the press was speculating on a third term for Volrich and commenting on the state of the civic parties. "It shouldn't be forgotten that the NPA group rode on Volrich's coat-tails in the 1978 election ... After the Volrich victory, the NPA breathed a sigh of relief and went back to sleep. As an organization, it has virtually no identity – only a title. The Electors' Action Movement has at least held an annual meeting and elected a new panel of officers, maintaining some show of activity."

In the 1980 election, Harcourt edged out Volrich, and TEAM's Martin Zlotnik came a distant third in the mayoral race. Brown and Ford were elected to council. No TEAM candidates were elected to school or park board.

Post-election analyses of TEAM's weaknesses helped explain its fall: the discouraging perception that it was washed up; the view that it was too conservative and its members had become complacent; the defections of Marzari, Harcourt and Volrich. Brown, who regained her council seat, said the perception of TEAM could not be good or more people would have voted for Zlotnik. "'There is a big rebuilding job to come,' she said. Brown agreed that a resurrection of TEAM would take a lot of work and there would be no guarantee of success."

The big issue of 1982 was another ward system plebiscite, which was approved by nearly 57 percent of voters. TEAM did not propose a mayoral candidate, but its two incumbent aldermen, Brown and Ford, ran and were elected, Brown placing a close second to poll-topper Harry Rankin of COPE.

In a 1982 column, Alan Fotheringham described how neither TEAM nor the NPA had been able to stop the rise of the left. "The progress of the left in the city of yachts and skis began a decade ago with the collapse of the real estate shield known as the Non-Partisan Association (NPA), so-named because it was vigorously partisan, formed to keep the dreaded socialists out of city hall. An academic-based reform group, The Electors' Action Movement (TEAM), picked up the pieces and greened Vancouver as the freeway forces were blocked. But TEAM, composed of quiche-eating Volvo drivers who carpooled their children to French immersion courses, didn't have the staying power of the humorless east side angries who have been steadily building their base on council, school board and park board."

In 1984, Brown and Ford again held their council seats. Two TEAM candidates for park board and one for school board were defeated.

Early in 1986, COPE's success in a byelection galvanized TEAM into action. Concerned about the prospect of a COPE-dominated council with Rankin at the helm, the party was making plans for a post-Expo 86 future. A Province story described Brown as "excited by the whole new mood and people wanting to get together the way they did in 1968". It noted that TEAM president Walter Hardwick believed polarized politics were taking precedence over solving urgent civic issues and that "ideology is clearly interfering with the advancement of public interest.'"

Phillips' former executive assistant Gordon Campbell, then an alderman, announced his candidacy for mayor and had the support of TEAM's May Brown. In the fourth quarter of 1986, a retirement party was held for Brown, who was "leaving politics without regret" after eight years on council, four on park board, and a 1978 mayoral run. Vancouver Sun columnist Pete McMartin noted, "Her absence from Vancouver civic politics will leave a very big gap to be filled. It may mean the end – in name, anyway, of TEAM and its eventual amalgamation into the remade NPA under Gordon Campbell."

The idea of amalgamating the NPA and TEAM caused a ruckus in the TEAM organization. Hardwick, a former alderman and member of TEAM since its founding in 1967, resigned as president because some board members were prepared to endorse Campbell and his NPA slate, The Sun reported. "I don't believe in coalitions and alliances", was the quote from Hardwick.

Ford was the only TEAM candidate in the November 1986 election; she ended in eleventh place. Campbell easily defeated Rankin and was elected mayor with seven NPA aldermen. COPE lost eight of its nine seats to the NPA, which swept the park board.

== Legacies ==
In 1988, columnist Denny Boyd characterized TEAM as "the civic party that developed three mayors, Art Phillips, Jack Volrich and Mike Harcourt, before fracturing and collapsing on itself and vanishing". But besides developing mayors, TEAM made many changes to the city's structure, neighbourhoods and operations that continue to shape it today.

Among the innovations at city hall:

- TEAM made civic government more accessible to residents by changing the time of meetings and welcoming delegations to speak.
- Vancouver's Property Endowment Fund was created to keep city land in city hands, preventing it from being sold for revenue.
- The development approvals process was initiated, including providing citizens with early information (development application notice boards) and an opportunity for input.
- The Heritage Advisory Board (now Heritage Commission) was created to catalog and retain historic buildings and areas.
- Local area planning was established in Fairview, Kitsilano, Champlain Heights, Killarney and the West End.

Neighbourhoods, parks and buildings:

- The planned medium-density neighbourhood on the formerly industrial south shore of False Creek is considered one of the most attractive and livable waterfront communities in Canada.
- Zoning was made for flexible to allow for residential buildings in the downtown commercial core.
- Granville Island was acquired and designed.
- Gastown was preserved and revitalized.
- Granville Mall was created.
- Land was acquired to complete public ownership of Langara Golf Course.
- The historic Orpheum Theatre was saved from demolition and acquired and refurbished as a civic theatre.
- Jericho Beach Park remains in a mostly natural state without a six-lane road bisecting it. The TEAM park board established a citizen's planning advisory committee for Jericho Beach Park in 1973.
- The Britannia Community Centre and West End Community Centre were created.
- The historic neighbourhoods of Strathcona and Chinatown were saved from destruction by the freeway that would also have blocked the Burrard Inlet waterfront from public access.
- Vancouver's first bicycle path was opened in 1974: a 7.8-kilometre (4.8 mi) trail in Stanley Park.
- Mini-parks were introduced in the West End.
- Land for the 42-hectare (105-acre) Everett Crowley Park was acquired.

Other amenities introduced:

- The city was made more accessible thanks to by-laws mandating curb cuts, ramps, handicap washrooms, and auditory crosswalks.
- The 9-1-1 emergency telephone service was established.
- A sign by-law largely abolished billboards.
