= William Rathie =

Canadian politician

30th Mayor of Vancouver
- In office 1963–1966
- Preceded by: A. Thomas Alsbury
- Succeeded by: Tom Campbell

Personal details
- Born: William George Rathie; April 1, 1914 Vancouver, British Columbia
- Died: November 26, 1994 (aged 80)
- Party: Non-Partisan Association
- Profession: Accountant

William George Rathie (April 1, 1914 – November 26, 1994) was a Canadian accountant and politician. He was the 30th mayor of the city of Vancouver, British Columbia, Canada, serving from 1963 through 1966.

Rathie was born in Vancouver and worked as a tax accountant. He was first elected to Vancouver City Council in 1959 as a member of the Non-Partisan Association, a civic political party. In 1962, Rathie wrested the NPA nomination from incumbent mayor Thomas Alsbury, and was elected to succeed him in that office.

Vancouver in the mid-sixties was enjoying spectacular growth in its economy and population, and was well on its way to becoming a major international city. During his tenure, a 20-year programme for Vancouver's redevelopment, encompassing transportation, low-cost housing, and downtown revitalization was outlined. Its scope and orientation would lead to controversy and protest following Rathie's term of office.
