= Bruce Eriksen =

Canadian social activist (1928–1997)

Vancouver City Council
- In office 1980–1993

Personal details
- Born: March 22, 1928 Winnipeg, Manitoba
- Died: March 16, 1997 (aged 68)
- Party: Coalition of Progressive Electors (COPE)
- Domestic partner: Libby Davies
- Children: 1
- Occupation: Artist, social activist, politician

Bruce Eriksen (March 22, 1928 – March 16, 1997) was a Canadian artist, social activist and founder of the Downtown Eastside Residents Association (DERA). Eriksen and DERA are recognised for materially improving the lives of residents in Vancouver's Downtown Eastside (DTES).

== Childhood and youth ==
Bruce Eriksen was born in Winnipeg, Manitoba, a child of an immigrant Danish couple. When he was five years old, he and two brothers were sent away to Knowles School for Boys, an orphanage, after the death of his mother. He ran away from the school at the age of twelve, and rode the freight trains to the West Coast, arriving in the DTES at age 14. By age sixteen he boarded a grain freight ship bound for Shanghai. Upon his return to British Columbia, he logged in the Franklin River and Port Alberni regions. During World War II, Eriksen worked in a shipyard in Vancouver, and became a member of the Seafarers' International Union of Canada. He eventually became an ironworker until a serious back injury forced him to take more sedentary work.

== Advocacy ==
In 1973, Vancouver city planner Peter Davies decided what was needed to address some of the DTES' health and social problems (high rates of tuberculosis and other communicable diseases related to poverty) was a democratic organization. He enlisted the support of Eriksen, Jean Swanson and Libby Davies, who organized DERA. The group's mandate was to build a democratic voice within the neighbourhood. The organization required its members to be residents of the community, which for many years had been known only by the pejorative Skid Road. DERA renamed the area the Downtown Eastside.

The contributions of DERA and Bruce Eriksen to the people of the DTES include the passing of a bylaw requiring hotels and rooming houses to have sprinkler systems, strong efforts in respect to rezoning, in order to protect affordable housing in the Downtown Eastside, and establishing the Carnegie Community Centre. Another accomplishment was the lighting of neighbourhood lanes and alleyways at night to prevent robberies, sexual assaults and beatings.

Davies describes Eriksen's advocacy of the sprinkler bylaw: "Neither the province nor the city made it mandatory for single-room occupancy (SRO) hotels to have sprinkler systems. Approximately 25 people died every year, 40 in 1973. DERA worked hard to have the bylaw changed. The struggle was ignored by the city and fought against by the landlords who threatened to close permanently if they were required to put sprinkler systems in. The fire deaths of five people in the Commercial Hotel on Cambie Street allowed Bruce Eriksen to corner the mayor at the site of the burning building in front of the media and demand he bring in sprinkler laws to stop the unnecessary deaths. This incident led to the passing of the (Vancouver) Fire Sprinkler Bylaw, responsible for the saving of many lives."

== Politics ==
In 1980, Eriksen was elected to Vancouver City Council as a member of the Coalition of Progressive Electors, and he served for six consecutive terms before retiring in 1993.

== Personal life ==
He was the common law spouse of fellow city councillor Libby Davies, who later became a New Democratic Party MP for Vancouver East. They had one child together. Bruce Eriksen died on March 16, 1997, after a year-long fight with cancer.

== Legacy ==
Near the corner of Main and Hastings streets, Bruce Eriksen Place, a social housing project, designed by Vancouver architect Gregory Henriquez, was opened in 1996. Inscribed on each of the balconies of the building are the words such as "Hope, Integrity, Vote, Dream, Vision, Courage and Respect", in tribute to Eriksen and his contribution to the community he loved. Bruce — The Musical (originally titled The Tipping Point) is a musical radio drama and stage play by Bob Sarti, with songs and music by Bob Sarti and Earle Peach. It features Bruce Eriksen as a character and describes the origins of DERA.
