= Tung Chan =

Hong Kong-born Canadian banker, municipal politician and community leader

Tung Chan OBC
- 陳志動

Vancouver City Councillor
- In office 1990–1993

Personal details
- Born: 1952 (age 73–74) British Hong Kong
- Party: Non-Partisan Association
- Education: University of British Columbia

Chinese name
- Traditional Chinese: 陳志動
Transcriptions
Standard Mandarin
- Hanyu Pinyin: Chén Zhìdòng
Yue: Cantonese
- Jyutping: Can^{4} Zi^{3}-dung^{6}

Tung Chan OBC (born 1952) is a Canadian banker, former municipal politician and community leader. He served on Vancouver City Council from 1990 to 1993, later became a vice-president of TD Bank, and was chief executive officer of S.U.C.C.E.S.S. from 2006 to 2010.

== Early life and banking career ==
Chan was born in British Hong Kong and attended Munsang College. He moved to Vancouver in 1974 at age 22 and studied sociology at the University of British Columbia. He worked as a waiter and bartender while at university, and volunteered with S.U.C.C.E.S.S., a Vancouver-based immigrant settlement and social service organization. He also helped produce Pender Guy, an English-language Chinese-Canadian community radio program on Vancouver Co-op Radio (CFRO 102.7 FM). After graduation he joined TD Bank, where he became a branch manager and later vice-president of Asian banking.

== Politics and public service ==
Chan ran for Vancouver City Council in the 1990 municipal election as a candidate of the Non-Partisan Association, finishing in eighth place to be elected one of ten councillors; he served one three-year term ending in 1993. In November 2006 he left banking to become chief executive officer of S.U.C.C.E.S.S., serving until his retirement in 2010. During his tenure at S.U.C.C.E.S.S., he oversaw an increase in the organization's annual budget from $16 million to $35 million, and extended its presence to Fort St. John, Shanghai, Taipei and Seoul. He was chair of the board of trustees of the Canadian Museum of Immigration at Pier 21 and founding board chair of E-Comm Emergency Communications.

He was appointed an Honorary Captain of the Royal Canadian Navy in 2010. In 2012, the Canadian Heraldic Authority granted Chan arms, a flag and a badge, as announced in the Canada Gazette. He was invested into the Order of British Columbia at Government House in July 2014; the Richmond Review described his recognition as honouring his work as a volunteer, philanthropist and community leader.
