= Downtown Eastside Residents Association =

Defunct non-profit society in Vancouver, British Columbia

- Abbreviation: DERA
- Founded: 1973; 53 years ago
- Founder: Bruce Eriksen; Libby Davies; Jean Swanson; Calvin Sandborn
- Dissolved: 2010; 16 years ago
- Type: Non-profit organization, social services
- Region served: Downtown Eastside, Vancouver

The Downtown Eastside Residents Association (DERA) was a non-profit society in the Downtown Eastside area of Vancouver, operating from 1973 until 2010.

== History ==
DERA was founded by Bruce Eriksen, Libby Davies, Jean Swanson, University of Victoria professor Calvin Sandborn, and other residents of the Downtown Eastside. Membership was restricted to those who live within the neighbourhood's boundaries.

The group was actively involved with opposition to the 2010 Winter Olympics, and was accused of possessing the Olympic Flag stolen from Vancouver City Hall on March 16, 2007. The association had close ties to the Anti-Poverty Committee (APC), with many APC members having worked for DERA or lived in subsidized housing run by the society. In May 2007, Vancouver city council denied a grant application submitted by DERA, with councillor Peter Ladner citing the group's connection to the Anti-Poverty Committee as a factor in the decision.

In March 2010, DERA was sued by BC Housing for allegedly mishandling public money and failing to pay $500,000 in property taxes and rents from three government-owned social housing buildings that they managed. Since the suit, the three buildings were handed over to a court-appointed receiver, and an undisclosed settlement was reached between DERA and BC Housing.

BC Housing issued a request for proposals in the summer of 2010 to find nonprofit housing societies to manage the buildings in the long term. Former Vancouver city councillor Jim Green, who had led DERA in the 1980s, stated that the settlement likely meant the end of DERA as a housing provider. After the settlement, DERA disbanded without an official announcement.
