= Coalition of Progressive Electors =

Municipal political party in Vancouver, Canada

- Abbreviation: COPE
- Co-chairs: Sam Smart; Nate Stanley
- Founded: 1968
- Ideology: Democratic socialism
- Political position: Left-wing
- City council: 4 / 11
- Park board: 4 / 7
- School board: 4 / 9

Website
- www.votecope.ca

The Coalition of Progressive Electors (COPE) is a municipal political party in the Canadian city of Vancouver, British Columbia. It has traditionally been associated with tenants, environmentalists, and the labour movement. COPE is generally guided by democratic socialist principles following the split of its social democratic wing in 2014 to form OneCity Vancouver, and has a long history of advocating for issues such as improving public transit and investing in affordable housing.

It last held a majority government on city council from 2002 to 2005.

In the 2026 Vancouver municipal election, COPE succeeded in having all 12 of its candidates elected, 4 to city council, 4 to the park board, and 4 to the school board.

COPE describes itself as being committed to renter protections, ending homelessness, taxing the rich to build social housing, safe supply, free transit, Indigenous reconciliation, climate action, and other social and environmental reforms.

== History ==
COPE was formed in 1968, originally as the "Committee of Progressive Electors", when a number of left-wing community groups and social justice organizations joined with the city's Labour Council to organize more effectively against the Non-Partisan Association (NPA) – a centre-right political party which had dominated civic politics in Vancouver. Frank Kennedy of the Vancouver & District Labour Council and Harry Rankin, an outspoken lawyer and city councillor, were key figures in shaping the coalition, along with activists from the British Columbia New Democratic Party and the Communist Party of British Columbia.

=== Beginnings (1970s and 1980s) ===
For most of its history, COPE existed in an uneasy relationship with centre-left parties at the municipal level. From 1972 to 1986 COPE competed with The Electors' Action Movement, which governed the city under prominent federal Liberal mayor Art Phillips in the mid-1970s. By the late 1970s, a breakaway faction of TEAM, comprising provincial NDP supporters and led by future premier Michael Harcourt formed an electoral alliance with COPE, from which both parties benefited. Led by Harcourt, the coalition governed from the centre and, although it ran a unified slate with COPE with the cooperation and support of the VDLC, Harcourt's small party of Civic Independents would sometimes vote with the councillors associated with the NDP and the remaining TEAM councillors against COPE's more socialist policies.

When Harcourt stepped down to become a provincial candidate and a renewed NPA led by future premier Gordon Campbell absorbed TEAM's two remaining councillors, COPE became the senior partner in its coalition with the Civic Independents. Nominating Rankin as its mayoral candidate, COPE fielded a virtually full slate of candidates (leaving three open spaces for the incumbent Civic Independents) but was badly beaten, the NPA returning to power for the first time in 14 years, and deprived for the next two years of Rankin's leadership in the council chamber.

=== COPE and independents (1980s–1990s) ===
In 1988, COPE entered the election an equal partner with the newly formed Civic New Democrats (Civic NDP), a party directly affiliated with the BC NDP. Led by anti-poverty activist Jean Swanson, the coalition made few gains, but under the leadership of Jim Green in 1990, the party came close to winning the election. While all COPE council candidates were elected, no Civic NDP candidates were (since a 1983 by-election, COPE had consistently out-performed all other leftist candidates on the concurrently elected School and Parks Boards). At this point, Vancouver's civic left conceded that the COPE brand was now more popular than any more centrist group. Thus, following the 1990 election, COPE merged with the Civic NDP, changing its name from the Committee of Progressive Electors to the Coalition of Progressive Electors. At this time, COPE made an official overture to the Green Party of Vancouver, the local affiliate of the Green Party of British Columbia, offering the group some minor policy concessions, joint billing in the party's ballot name ("COPE-Green '93") and assurances that important party members would ensure some Greens were nominated. The Greens turned the deal down.

Starting in 1993, COPE nominated candidates for all civic offices (mayor, city councillor, school board trustee, and park commissioner) but its closer affiliation with an incumbent provincial NDP government and inability to negotiate a deal with the Greens, who began siphoning votes in increasing numbers, resulted in flagging performance. Rankin's retirement from council also damaged the party. In 1993, COPE's representation fell to only one councillor, future MLA Jenny Kwan. COPE did not win any seats in 1996, thanks to a strong showing for the Greens and a left-right coalition called VOICE, led by Rankin's wife Connie Fogal and 1984 mayoral candidate Jonathan Baker. With this fragmentation of the civic left, the NPA won all 27 contested seats in that election with only 43% of the vote.

In 1999, COPE regained its footholds on school board and city council and the Greens gained a seat on the park board under the leadership of mayoral candidate David Cadman. The two independent candidates who had also joined the coalition were defeated, although former NPA councillor Nancy Chiavario came close to keeping her council seat after being pushed out by supporters of Jennifer Clarke at the NPA nominating meeting.

=== COPE's first government (2002) ===
In 2002, the NPA was divided between a right-wing faction led by Jennifer Clarke and a moderate faction led by and NPA mayor Philip Owen, creating the possibility of a COPE majority.

Former chief coroner and RCMP officer Larry Campbell, fictionalized on the CBC show Da Vinci's Inquest, was nominated by COPE as its mayoral candidate. Although Campbell attempted to keep the Greens in the fold, a new provincial leadership had taken control and pulled the party out of its municipal coalitions.

Clarke's takeover of the NPA and her purge of its centrists was highly unpopular with Vancouver voters, especially her movement's deposition of the incumbent mayor, an ally of Campbell. In the 2002 municipal election, an unprecedented surge in voter turnout elected the first COPE mayor and board majorities in Vancouver's history. Every candidate running under COPE's banner was elected.

As the governing party, COPE created a new Climate Task Force, implemented ethical purchasing policy, built bike routes, and legalized secondary suites, among other initiatives.

=== Vision Vancouver splits (2005) ===
By late 2004, there were growing signs of disunity between the COPE mayor and some COPE councillors. Campbell formed an independent caucus along with three of his COPE colleagues (although they all remained as members of the party). The other COPE councillors remained in the original COPE caucus.

The maverick COPE councillors (dubbed "COPE Lite" or "Diet COPE" by the media) eventually separated and formed a new party, Vision Vancouver, to run in the 2005 municipal election. COPE did not run a mayoral candidate to challenge Vision nominee, former COPE councillor Jim Green.

In the election for Vancouver City Council held in November 2005, only one COPE councillor (David Cadman) was elected. The party was reduced to three seats on the city school board and two on the parks board, newcomer Spencer Herbert, and Loretta Woodcock.

=== More alliances (2007–2008) ===
In May 2007, a slate was elected to the COPE executive, called "the group of seven" by some media. All seven members of the slate were elected with a mandate to seek an electoral coalition with Vision Vancouver. From 2007 to 2008, 50% of COPE's executive was under the age of 30, unprecedented for a major civic municipal party in Canada. COPE made overtures to Vision Vancouver to enter into a coalition for the 2008 election "to defeat the NPA" with little success. It was not until Gregor Robertson was nominated as Vision Vancouver's mayoral candidate that formal negotiations between the two organizations began in early summer of 2008.

COPE and Vision Vancouver reached a tentative agreement in late summer 2008, which was later ratified by the Vision Vancouver executive and COPE membership. COPE agreed not to run a mayoral candidate to avoid splitting the progressive vote.

=== Decline (2008–2011) ===
In the 2008 Vancouver municipal election voters replaced the NPA-dominated council with a near sweep of COPE, Green and Vision Vancouver candidates. COPE elected six of nine candidates across the city council, the park board, and the school board, running a new media and youth-oriented campaign.

In the leadup to the 2011 election, several party activists launched a campaign to separate from Vision Vancouver, arguing that in coalition with Vision, that COPE "[hadn't] been able to do anything." The activists were defeated by the majority of COPE members.

In the November 19, 2011, election, a single COPE candidate was elected. The elected candidate was incumbent Allan Wong, as one of nine school trustees. COPE ran a total of nine candidates in the election.

On December 8, 2013, Allan Wong, COPE's sole elected politician, resigned from the party to join Vision Vancouver.

=== 2011–2014 ===
After the election loss in 2011, a group called "Independent COPE" was elected to COPE's executive board.

During this time, a number of high-profile COPE members and former candidates left the party, including former Vancouver School Board trustee Jane Bouey, former BC NDP MLA David Chudnovsky, former candidates RJ Aquino and Gwen Giesbrecht, and Stuart Parker.

At the party's annual general meeting in 2013, Independent COPE captured a majority by a wide margin. The membership also passed a motion to run a mayoral candidate in the 2014 election, and a majority of candidates for city council, school board, and park board.

In September 2014, only two of COPE's 17 candidates were endorsed by the Vancouver & District Labour Council – the labour organization that helped found the political party nearly five decades prior.

=== 2014 municipal election ===
At a general meeting in September 2014, an overwhelming majority of COPE membership endorsed Meena Wong as the 2014 mayoral candidate. The community organizer and activist stated that the focuses of her campaign would be giving citizens a voice and keeping housing affordable. She also proposed a tax on vacant homes in Vancouver.

In addition to Wong, the membership endorsed a slate of 16 candidates, including former councillor Tim Louis. In accordance with the party's equity policy there was an Indigenous candidate for each board and the majority of candidates were female.

The party's 2014 election platform advocated for a new Vancouver Housing Authority, for Vancouver to become a sanctuary city, to implement a municipal minimum wage of $15 per hour, and to hold a referendum for electoral reform to consider switching from a first-past-the-post voting system to a proportional representation system.

=== 2018 municipal election ===
COPE ran seven candidates in the 2018 Vancouver municipal election: Jean Swanson, Derrick O'Keefe, and Anne Roberts for city council; Gwen Giesbrecht and John Irwin for park board; and Diana Day and Barb Parrott for school board. The party had four of its candidates elected and achieved representation on each of the city's boards. The 2018 COPE campaign called for a mansion tax to end homelessness, a moratorium on renovictions, and a four-year rent freeze.

=== 2022 municipal election ===
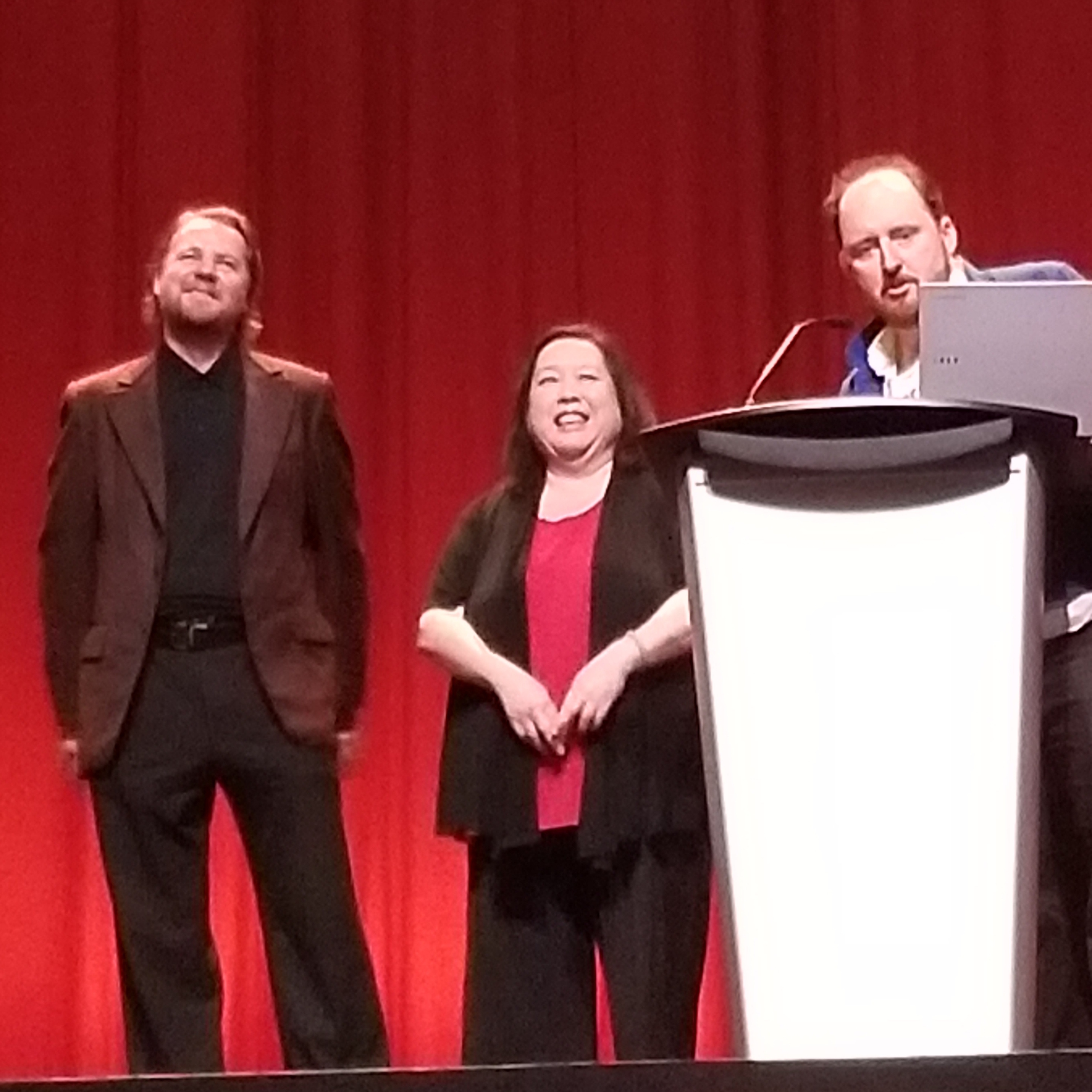
Sean Orr (left) and Suzie Mah (centre)

COPE ran nine candidates in the 2022 Vancouver municipal election, including incumbent councillor Jean Swanson and former NDP candidate Breen Ouellette for city council, Eva Nancy Trigueros Chavez as city council and incumbent park board commissioner Gwen Giesbrecht. Both incumbents lost re-election, while school board candidate Suzie Mah was elected, placing seventh.

In 2025, COPE returned to city council with the election of Sean Orr in the 2025 Vancouver City Council by-election. Orr previously ran for city council during the 2022 Vancouver municipal election as part of VOTE Socialist.

=== 2026 municipal election ===
In April 2026, COPE, OneCity Vancouver and the Green Party of Vancouver reached an agreement to limit the number of candidates each party would run in the October municipal election, seeking to reduce competition among progressive candidates. Each party could nominate up to five council candidates. COPE and the Greens could each run up to four candidates for both the school board and park board, while OneCity could run five for school board and three for park board. The agreement initially allowed each party to nominate a mayoral candidate while committing them to work towards identifying a single progressive contender.

COPE's mayoral candidate, Stephanie Allen, withdrew on September 2, citing the need to unite progressive voters against incumbent mayor Ken Sim. OneCity's William Azaroff withdrew on September 8 and endorsed the Greens' Pete Fry, leaving Fry as the only mayoral candidate from the three parties.

In the October 17 election, all four COPE council candidates were elected: Sean Orr, Chloe Leslie, Devyani Singh and Solomon Yi-Kieran. The party also won four seats on the park board, with T'uy't'tanat Cease Wyss, Tamiko Suzuki, Jamie Han and Sacia Burton elected, and four seats on the school board, with Suzie Mah, Melanie Cheng, Gwen Giesbrecht and Derrick O'Keefe elected. Fry defeated Sim in the mayoral election.

== Election results ==
COPE election results for mayor of Vancouver, 1972 to present
Election	Candidate	Votes	%	Position	Status
1972	Agnes Dennis	5,957	7.26	3rd	Not elected
1976	Bruce Yorke	12,581	13.98	3rd	Not elected
1978	Bruce Yorke		16	3rd	Not elected
1986	Harry Rankin	58,240	41.84	2nd	Not elected
1988	Jean Swanson	45,178	37.42	2nd	Not elected
1990	Jim Green			2nd	Not elected
1993	Libby Davies	37,812	40.52	2nd	Not elected
1996	Carmela Allevato	26,143	–	2nd	Not elected
1999	David Cadman	33,506	35.54	2nd	Not elected
2002	Larry Campbell	80,772	57.79	▲1st	Elected
2014	Meena Wong	16,791	9.24	3rd	Not elected
2018	None	–	–	–	Did not contest
2022	None	–	–	–	Did not contest
2026	Stephanie Allen	–	–	–	Withdrew

COPE election results for Vancouver City Council, 1996 to present
Election	Seats	+/–	Votes	%	Change	Status
1996	0 / 11	Steady	236,740	28.35		No seats
1999	2 / 11	▲2	145,594	18.25	▼10.10	Opposition
2002	8 / 11	▲6	494,098	43.13	▲24.88	Majority government
2005	1 / 11	▼7	227,215	20.97	▼22.16	Opposition
2008	2 / 11	▲1	102,542	9.87	▼11.10	Crossbench
2011	0 / 11	▼2	131,537	10.92	▲1.05	No seats
2014	0 / 11	Steady	187,733	12.92	▲2.00	No seats
2018	1 / 11	▲1	123,701	8.86	▼4.06	Crossbench
2022	0 / 11	▼1	94,541	7.02	▼1.84	No seats
2025	1 / 11	▲1	34,448	25.92	▲18.9	Opposition
2026 (Note: COPE, OneCity Vancouver and the Green Party of Vancouver agreed to run no more than five council candidates each to reduce competition among progressive candidates and improve their chances of election. The parties also agreed to work towards a single progressive mayoral candidate; following the withdrawals of COPE's Stephanie Allen and OneCity's William Azaroff, the Greens' Pete Fry was the only remaining mayoral candidate from the three parties.)	4 / 11	▲3	276,663	16.74	▼9.18	Crossbench
