= Walter Hardwick =

Canadian politician (1932–2005)

Walter Hardwick OBC (May 3, 1932 – June 9, 2005) was a Canadian politician and academic who worked in the city and region of Vancouver. Hardwick was involved in public life in British Columbia at the civic, regional, provincial, and national levels. His longest service to the province was through his teaching and scholarship; he taught in the Department of Geography at the University of British Columbia (UBC) for over thirty years. He is the father of former Vancouver City Councillor Colleen Hardwick.

== Academia: early years ==
As a young geography professor in 1962, Hardwick made news discussing the plight of students living in substandard conditions due to the city's zoning policy against secondary suites in the area adjacent to the University Endowment Lands. Based on survey data that nearly a quarter of UBC's students were living in that area, he recommend it be rezoned to accommodate them. He was part of a team of professors who assisted UBC President John B. Macdonald in the production of his influential report, "Higher Education in British Columbia and a Plan for the Future," published in 1962. Hardwick had suggested Burnaby as the site of the future Simon Fraser University and later got into a public dispute with SFU's president on what the building cost should be; he stated that the target of the fundraising campaign was double what it needed to be.

The B.C. Educational Research Council, a central agency to promote, finance and report on education research around the province, named Hardwick as its first permanent director in 1964.

With his brother David F. Hardwick he established Tantalus Research Ltd.

== Civic planning and politics ==
Hardwick significantly shaped the city and metropolitan region of Vancouver. In 1964, he conducted the first survey of its kind on the reasons for success or failure of downtown businesses. The evidence he gathered indicated that freeways were not necessary in Vancouver, and he stated that the proponents of the freeway were using data that was years out of date. In a speech to a downtown business group, he outlined the steps needed to revitalize the city's failing core: expand office-type employment; increase residential density near the core; build facilities to attract tourists and conventions; create a climate favourable to the establishment of finance and banking head offices, stock exchanges and commercial enterprises.

In the late 1960s, he helped to organize a successful movement against the proposed freeway through the Vancouver, a scheme planned in relative secrecy at the time by the City and the Province. Following the defeat of the freeway proposal, he was a founding member of "The Electors' Action Movement" (TEAM) and was elected to Vancouver City Council under that banner for three terms in 1968, 1970 and 1972. While at the city, he helped to transform its decision-making processes with more public involvement for major planning decisions. Hardwick played a pivotal advisory role in the city's redevelopment of Granville Island. Hardwick chaired the city committee planning the redevelopment of the south shore of False Creek from an industrial area to a residential district of about 10,000 people, with the emphasis on access by foot and transit rather than cars. Plans included a public marina to be run by the park board. The innovative model neighbourhood became world famous and has held steady to the present day.

Hardwick was both chair of the Urban Studies Committee at UBC and a Vancouver alderman when the city committed funds to the Inter-Institutional Policy Simulator (IIPS) project. He opposed it as a drain on university research funds and as a dangerous precedent for city planning which could present data to suit any bias. He won some concessions at city hall including “a reappraisal of the entire project by all parties in 1972; open access to all data gathered, and a promise from the city administration that IIPS wouldn’t be used as an excuse to delay planning decisions.”

Despite an interest in politics and political processes, he decided not to run for a fourth term as alderman.

== After city council ==
In 1973 Hardwick published "Vancouver Urban Futures," a detailed survey for the Greater Vancouver Regional District that captured the opinions and interests of Greater Vancouver residents on a range of economic, social, mobility and lifestyle issues. The survey was instrumental in setting new Regional Growth planning policies. In 1990 he completed a similar follow up study "Creating Our Future" to compare the results and to offer policy makers further insight into the priorities and concerns of Greater Vancouver residents.

In 1975, Hardwick was appointed Director of Continuing Education at UBC, a post he relinquished in 1976 to serve as deputy to Minister of Education Pat McGeer in the Social Credit government of Bill Bennett. In that capacity, he ruled against Surrey School Board in its dispute with the Surrey Teachers Association, whose members opposed the establishment of a “value school,” citing the board's lack of jurisdiction to do so under the School Act. A major focus as deputy minister was to expand post-secondary options in the province's interior.

Hardwick was appointed to head the board of the newly created Knowledge Network of the West in 1980. “’Everything carried on the network must be backed up by study guides, texts and tutors offered by the post-secondary institutions or the Open Learning Institute,’ says Hardwick. ‘We’re an educational and instructional network, not public broadcasting.’” Hardwick pushed for Vancouver to become headquarters of a Commonwealth-wide open university network.

From 1986 to 1990 he served on, and chaired (1990), the National Capital Commission, with a mandate related to the planning of Canada's historic capital city of Ottawa, Ontario.

== Recognition ==
In 1977, Hardwick was awarded the Order of British Columbia for his contributions on civic, regional, provincial, national and international levels.

In 2000 he was recognized with an honorary degree from UBC. A UBC Urban Geography Award and scholarship was established in his name: The Walter G. Hardwick Scholarship in Urban Studies.

In 2006, a new east-west street in Vancouver's Olympic Village neighbourhood was named Walter Hardwick Avenue.

In dedicating their 2007 book, City Making in Paradise: Nine Decisions that Saved Vancouver to Hardwick's memory, authors Mike Harcourt, Ken Cameron and Sean Rossiter wrote that "Harwick's presence permeated many of the decisions we identified as being critical to the Greater Vancouver region's livability".

== Other publications ==
- British Columbia: One Hundred Years of Geographic Change (with J. Lewis Robinson; Vancouver, B.C. : Talon Books, 1993)
- Geography of the Forest Industry of Coastal British Columbia (Vancouver, B.C. : Published for the Canadian Association of Geographers, British Columbia Division, at the Dept. of Geography, University of British Columbia, by Tantalus c1963)
- The Mobile Consumer: Automobile-Oriented Retailing and Site Selection (with R. James Claus; Don Mills, Ontario : Collier-Macmillan, 1972)
- Shaping a Livable Vancouver Region (with Raymon Torchinsky & Arthur Fallick; Vancouver, B.C. : Dept. of Geography, University of British Columbia, 1991)
- Vancouver (Don Mills, Ont. : Collier-Macmillan Canada; New York : Macmillan Publishing Co., 1974)
