= Peter Oberlander =

Canadian architect (1922–2008)

H. Peter Oberlander
- Born: November 29, 1922; Vienna, Austria
- Died: December 27, 2008 (aged 86)
- Occupation: Architect
- Awards: Order of Canada, UBC Honorary Doctorate (1998), Civic Merit Award, City of Vancouver (2008), UN-HABITAT Scroll of Honour (2009)

Heinz Peter Oberlander, OC (November 29, 1922 – December 27, 2008) was a Canadian architect and Canada's first professor of Urban and Regional Planning.

== Early life and education ==
Born in Vienna, Austria, he settled in Britain with his family after fleeing the Anschluss in 1938. In 1940, he was deported to Canada where he was held in a series of internment camps. Presumed to be a "dangerous enemy alien", he was finally released in 1942, and received a Bachelor of Architecture degree from McGill University in 1945. After McGill graduation in architecture, Oberlander was the first Canadian to obtain the Master of Urban Planning and subsequently a PhD in Urban and Regional Planning from Harvard University. Thus started a pioneer career in education and practice of community and regional planning.

== Teaching and research ==
The impending post-war urban development boom compelled Oberlander to plead for the need to educate urban planners in Canada, with explicit federal government fellowship support, now a forty-year-old tradition. N.A.M. Mackenzie, then President of the University of British Columbia and member of the Massey Commission, was intrigued by this simple idea, and within six months invited Oberlander to come to Vancouver and launch UBC Canada's first full professional program in Community and Regional Planning. Four decades of teaching and research followed, during which Oberlander became the founding Director of the UBC School of Community and Regional Planning, and subsequently founding Director of the Centre for Human Settlements, devoted to planning research.

== Government career ==
In 1970, Oberlander was called to Ottawa to initiate the Federal Government's Ministry of State for Urban Affairs, and become its inaugural Secretary (Deputy Minister). During his three-year tenure he created a process of tri-level consultation on urban development between federal, provincial and municipal governments, leading to planned re-use of redundant federal lands for local community needs; Vancouver's Granville Island and Toronto's Harbourfront are two examples.

== United Nations work ==
Upon returning to UBC, Oberlander assisted in convening the UN Conference on Human Settlements (Habitat) in Vancouver in 1976 and following the Conference, founded the Centre for Human Settlements at the University, charged with continuing the Conference's research agenda. Between 1980 and 1990 he served on the Canadian Delegations to the annual meetings of the UN Commission on Human Settlements, Nairobi, Kenya.

Beginning in 2002, Oberlander was deeply involved in persuading the Canadian Government to invite the United Nations to convene the UN World Urban Forum (WUF3) in Vancouver June 2006 and thereby commemorate the first UN Conference on Human Settlements, 30 years’ earlier. It led to a formal invitation by the Prime Minister and its acceptance by the United Nations.

The World Urban Forum III attracted more than 10,000 participants and set a new standard for substantive participation and networking among public, private, and NGO groups, and citizens generally, in exchanging practical solutions to urgent environmental problems resulting from unprecedented rates of worldwide urbanization. WUF3 contributed substantively to the global recognition for the urgent need for achieving Sustainable Urbanization by “Turning Ideas into Action” through the UN with Canada's initiative. For WUF3 Oberlander prepared a substantive report on Canada/UN-HABITAT Initiatives 1976-2006 titled “Towards Sustainable Urbanization”. It provided the first documented record of Canada's leadership in the field of human settlements within the UN system. Following his lifelong commitment to the motto "Ideas into Action", his final project was to establish The Habitat Exchange, an on-line portal and archive of international human settlement resources.

Oberlander was posthumously awarded with the United Nations Scroll of Honour Award on World Habitat Day, October 4, 2009, for his work and dedication to improving global urban living conditions.

== Other activities ==
During the 1960s, Oberlander worked extensively with Thompson, Berwick and Pratt, an architectural and planning firm in Vancouver. During the 1990s Oberlander maintained his professional involvement as Associate Partner with Downs/Archambault and Partners (now DA Architects + Planners) in Vancouver. In civic politics, he was a founder of The Electors' Action Movement and ran for office under its banner. He was Chairman of the Vancouver School Board in the 1960s, and contributed to many community projects in Vancouver, nationally and internationally.

Oberlander was the UBC Professor Emeritus in Community and Regional Planning, pursuing an active research program at the UBC Centre for Human Settlements until his death. Concurrently, since 1995, he served as Adjunct Professor in Political Science at Simon Fraser University. Between 1998 and 2008, Oberlander served as a Federal Citizenship Court Judge.

== Personal life ==
In 1953 Oberlander married landscape architect Cornelia Hahn. The couple, who had three children, occasionally cooperated on urban planning and landscape architecture projects.
