= Anti-Poverty Committee =

Direct action organization in Vancouver, Canada

The Anti-Poverty Committee (APC) was a militant left-wing anarchist organisation based in Vancouver, British Columbia, that campaigned against poverty and homelessness.

The APC participated in direct action events such as sit-ins, squats, and vandalism to protest the closure of low-income housing projects and garnered considerable attention with disruptive protests centred on the 2010 Winter Olympics in Vancouver, including the instigation of a small-scale riot on the opening day of the games.

According to its website, the Anti-Poverty Committee was "an organization of poor and working people, who fight for poor people, their rights and an end to poverty by any means necessary." The APC ceased meeting in the summer of 2010, when they stopped renting an office space for meetings, and is no longer an active organization.

== Opposition to the 2010 Winter Olympics ==
In May 2007, the Vancouver Police Department arrested APC organizer David Cunningham as part of an investigation into threats to "evict" members of the board for the 2010 Winter Olympic Games from their homes and offices. During the arrest, a police officer posed as a reporter for the Vancouver newspaper 24 Hours. The paper's editor later criticized the officer's actions, stating that they could undermine public trust in the media.

On May 22, 2007, following Cunningham's arrest, three APC activists pretended to be delivering flowers as a ruse to gain entry to the Vancouver offices of BC Premier Gordon Campbell. The group began destroying glassware, as well as overturning furniture and scattering documents. The group stated that this action was an eviction of 2010 Winter Olympic Games special advisor Ken Dobell from his office.

== See also ==
- Downtown Eastside Residents Association
- Poverty in Canada
