= Bruce Yorke =

Canadian housing activist and politician

Member of the Vancouver City Council
- In office 1980–1991

Personal details
- Born: Gregory Bruce Yorke; December 10, 1924 Vancouver, British Columbia, Canada
- Died: December 5, 2015 (aged 90) Vancouver, British Columbia, Canada
- Party: Coalition of Progressive Electors

Gregory Bruce Yorke (December 10, 1924 – December 5, 2015) was a housing activist and city councillor in Vancouver, British Columbia, Canada.

== Vancouver Tenants Council ==
Yorke was key in establishing the Vancouver Tenants Council, which was an organization of tenants that performed direct economic action against landlords and lobbied the provincial government. Between the years of 1968 and 1978 they fought and won the right for tenants to vote in municipal elections. In the early 1970s, Yorke was the "main voice and organizer for tenants".

== The Coalition of Progressive Electors ==
Yorke first ran for the Coalition of Progressive Electors on a slate with Harry Rankin in 1968. Rankin was the only COPE Councillor elected. He ran again unsuccessfully in 1970, 1972, and 1974, and in 1976 was their mayoralty candidate. He was finally elected in 1980, and would serve four terms as a councillor, through 1980 to 1986, and then again from 1990 to 1993. He had to step down in 1991 due to a heart condition.
