= Vancouver City Council =

Governing body of Vancouver, Canada

Type
- Type: Unicameral

Leadership
- Mayor: Pete Fry, Green Party of Vancouver since November 2, 2026
- Deputy mayor: Sean Orr, COPE since November 2, 2026

Structure
- Seats: 10 councillors and 1 mayor
- Political groups: Green (5) COPE (4) OneCity (1) ABC Vancouver (1)

Elections
- Voting system: Plurality at-large voting (councillors); First past the post (mayor)
- Last election: October 17, 2026
- Next election: October 19, 2030

Meeting place
- Council Chamber; Vancouver City Hall; Vancouver, British Columbia

Website
- vancouver.ca/your-government/vancouver-city-council.aspx

Vancouver City Council is the governing body of Vancouver, British Columbia. The council consists of a mayor and ten councillors elected to serve a four-year term. Monthly, a deputy mayor is appointed from among the councillors. City council meetings are held in Vancouver City Hall. The incumbent mayor is Pete Fry, who leads the Green Party of Vancouver. The current council and mayoralty were elected on October 17, 2026.

== Structure ==
=== Elections ===
Prior to 1966, councillors (then called aldermen) were elected for staggered one- and two-year terms with elections being held every year. In line with other municipalities across British Columbia, the frequencies of elections was decreased to every two years from 1966, again to every three starting with the 1993 election, and finally to every four years beginning with the 2018 election.

Unlike many other cities of its size, all Vancouver city councillors are elected at-large, rather than being elected to represent municipal wards. The city had previously used a ward system since incorporation in 1886 until it was abolished in 1936. Vancouver also experimented with proportional representation between 1921–23. Since 1936, there have been sporadic attempts to return to the ward system, with referendums on the subject held in 1973, 1978, and 1982. The most recent such proposal was rejected by voters in a 2004 referendum.

=== Powers ===
The Vancouver Charter outlines the structure, powers and responsibility of the city council. Under the charter, the mayor and city council have the power to:

- Pass by-laws regulating such things as businesses, building, noise, and land use
- Buy and sell property
- Collect property taxes and other taxes
- Approve major spending for all parts of the City government
- Take on debt
- Allocate funds for special activities, such as arts and community services
- Set up departments and offices for City services
- Hire staff for City departments and offices

Council also maintains a number of standing committees which meet to deliberate on specific topics and hear from speakers. Examples include the City Finance and Services Committee and the Policy and Strategic Priorities Committee. Each committee consists of the entire city council. City council also holds public hearings for spot rezonings.

The mayor chairs council meetings and appoints members to regional boards, such as the Metro Vancouver board of directors.

== Membership ==
Timeline of elections to the city council and mayoralty since 1966.

From incorporation in 1886, the council had 10 aldermen and a mayor. The number of aldermen was increased to 12 in 1904 and again to 16 in 1912 before being reduced to 8 in 1916. The council arrived at the present composition of 10 aldermen in 1958. In 1993, the title of alderman was changed to councillor.

=== 2026–present ===
Name	Party	Position	Term start	Term end
Pete Fry	Green	Mayor	November 2, 2026	Incumbent
Annette Reilly	Green	Councillor	November 2, 2026	Incumbent
Stephanie Smith	Green	Councillor	November 2, 2026	Incumbent
Camil Dumont	Green	Councillor	November 2, 2026	Incumbent
Sean Orr	COPE	Councillor, Deputy Mayor	November 2, 2026	Incumbent
Chloe Leslie	COPE	Councillor	November 2, 2026	Incumbent
Devyani Singh	COPE	Councillor	November 2, 2026	Incumbent
Solomon Yi-Kieran	COPE	Councillor	November 2, 2026	Incumbent
Bridget Burns	Green	Councillor	November 2, 2026	Incumbent
Lucy Maloney	OneCity Vancouver	Councillor	November 2, 2026	Incumbent
Mike Klassen	ABC Vancouver	Councillor	November 2, 2026	Incumbent

== Past Councils ==
=== 2022–2026 ===
Name	Party	Position
Ken Sim	ABC Vancouver	Mayor
Rebecca Bligh	ABC Vancouver (2022–2025) (Note: Bligh was ejected from ABC Vancouver on February 14, 2025.)	Councillor
Rebecca Bligh	Independent (2025)	Councillor
Rebecca Bligh	Vote Vancouver (2025–2026)	Councillor
Lisa Dominato	ABC Vancouver	Councillor
Sarah Kirby-Yung	ABC Vancouver	Councillor
Mike Klassen	ABC Vancouver	Councillor
Peter Meiszner	ABC Vancouver	Councillor
Brian Montague	ABC Vancouver	Councillor
Lenny Zhou	ABC Vancouver	Councillor
Adriane Carr (2022–2025)	Green	Councillor
Pete Fry	Green	Councillor
Sean Orr (2025–2026)	COPE	Councillor
Christine Boyle (2022–2024)	OneCity	Councillor
Lucy Maloney (2025–2026)	OneCity	Councillor

=== 2018–2022 ===
Name	Party	Position
Kennedy Stewart	Independent (2018–2020)	Mayor
Kennedy Stewart	Forward Together (2020–2022)	Mayor
Rebecca Bligh	NPA (2018–2019)	Councillor
Rebecca Bligh	Independent (2019–2022)	Councillor
Rebecca Bligh	ABC Vancouver (2022)	Councillor
Melissa De Genova	NPA	Councillor
Lisa Dominato	NPA (2018–2021)	Councillor
Lisa Dominato	Independent (2021–2022)	Councillor
Lisa Dominato	ABC Vancouver (2022)	Councillor
Colleen Hardwick	NPA (2018–2021)	Councillor
Colleen Hardwick	Independent (2021–2022)	Councillor
Colleen Hardwick	TEAM (2022)	Councillor
Sarah Kirby-Yung	NPA (2018–2021)	Councillor
Sarah Kirby-Yung	Independent (2021–2022)	Councillor
Sarah Kirby-Yung	ABC Vancouver (2022)	Councillor
Adriane Carr	Green	Councillor
Pete Fry	Green	Councillor
Michael Wiebe	Green	Councillor
Jean Swanson	COPE	Councillor
Christine Boyle	OneCity	Councillor

=== 2014–2018 ===
Name	Party	Position
Gregor Robertson	Vision Vancouver	Mayor
Raymond Louie	Vision Vancouver	Councillor
Heather Deal	Vision Vancouver	Councillor
Kerry Jang	Vision Vancouver	Councillor
Andrea Reimer	Vision Vancouver	Councillor
Tim Stevenson	Vision Vancouver	Councillor
Elizabeth Ball	NPA	Councillor
George Affleck	NPA	Councillor
Melissa De Genova	NPA	Councillor
Adriane Carr	Green	Councillor
Geoff Meggs (2014–2017)	Vision Vancouver	Councillor
Hector Bremner (Note: Bremner's seat originally belonged to Geoff Meggs, who had been elected as a Vision Vancouver candidate during the 2014 municipal election. His seat was vacated as a result of Premier John Horgan appointing Meggs as his chief of staff. Bremner was elected October 14, 2017, in a by-election.) (2017–2018)	Yes Vancouver	Councillor

=== 2011–2014 ===
Name	Party	Position
Gregor Robertson	Vision Vancouver	Mayor
Raymond Louie	Vision Vancouver	Councillor
Heather Deal	Vision Vancouver	Councillor
Tony Tang	Vision Vancouver	Councillor
Kerry Jang	Vision Vancouver	Councillor
Andrea Reimer	Vision Vancouver	Councillor
Tim Stevenson	Vision Vancouver	Councillor
Geoff Meggs	Vision Vancouver	Councillor
Elizabeth Ball	NPA	Councillor
George Affleck	NPA	Councillor
Adriane Carr	Green	Councillor

=== 2008–2011 ===
Name	Party	Position
Gregor Robertson	Vision Vancouver	Mayor
Raymond Louie	Vision Vancouver	Councillor
Heather Deal	Vision Vancouver	Councillor
George Chow	Vision Vancouver	Councillor
Kerry Jang	Vision Vancouver	Councillor
Andrea Reimer	Vision Vancouver	Councillor
Tim Stevenson	Vision Vancouver	Councillor
Geoff Meggs	Vision Vancouver	Councillor
David Cadman	COPE	Councillor
Ellen Woodsworth	COPE	Councillor
Suzanne Anton	NPA	Councillor

=== 2005–2008 ===
Name	Party	Position
Sam Sullivan	NPA	Mayor
Suzanne Anton	NPA	Councillor
Peter Ladner	NPA	Councillor
Kim Capri	NPA	Councillor
Elizabeth Ball	NPA	Councillor
B.C. Lee	NPA	Councillor
Raymond Louie	Vision Vancouver	Councillor
Tim Stevenson	Vision Vancouver	Councillor
George Chow	Vision Vancouver	Councillor
Heather Deal	Vision Vancouver	Councillor
David Cadman	COPE	Councillor

=== 2002–2005 ===
Name	Party	Position
Larry Campbell	COPE (2002–2005) (Note: Campbell, Green, Louie, and Stevenson formed an independent caucus within COPE in 2004 before forming Vision Vancouver in 2005.)	Mayor
Larry Campbell	Vision Vancouver (2005)	Mayor
Fred Bass	COPE	Councillor
David Cadman	COPE	Councillor
Jim Green	COPE (2002–2005)	Councillor
Jim Green	Vision Vancouver (2005)	Councillor
Peter Ladner	NPA	Councillor
Raymond Louie	COPE (2002–2005)	Councillor
Raymond Louie	Vision Vancouver (2005)	Councillor
Tim Louis	COPE	Councillor
Anne Roberts	COPE	Councillor
Tim Stevenson	COPE (2002–2005)	Councillor
Tim Stevenson	Vision Vancouver (2005)	Councillor
Sam Sullivan	NPA	Councillor
Ellen Woodsworth	COPE	Councillor

=== 1999–2002 ===
Name	Party	Position
Philip Owen	NPA	Mayor
Jennifer Clarke	NPA	Councillor
Lynne Kennedy	NPA	Councillor
Daniel Lee	NPA	Councillor
Gordon Price	NPA	Councillor
George Puil	NPA	Councillor
Don Lee	NPA	Councillor
Sandy McCormick	NPA	Councillor
Sam Sullivan	NPA	Councillor
Fred Bass	COPE	Councillor
Tim Louis	COPE	Councillor

=== 1996–1999 ===
Name	Party	Position
Philip Owen	NPA	Mayor
Jennifer Clarke	NPA	Councillor
Gordon Price	NPA	Councillor
Don Bellamy	NPA	Councillor
George Puil	NPA	Councillor
Lynne Kennedy	NPA	Councillor
Nancy Chiavario	NPA	Councillor
Sam Sullivan	NPA	Councillor
Daniel Lee	NPA	Councillor
Don Lee	NPA	Councillor
Alan Herbert	NPA	Councillor

=== 1993–1996 ===
Name	Party	Position
Philip Owen	NPA	Mayor
Lynne Kennedy	NPA	Councillor
Don Bellamy	NPA	Councillor
Gordon Price	NPA	Councillor
George Puil	NPA	Councillor
Maggie Ip	NPA	Councillor
Jennifer Clarke	NPA	Councillor
Sam Sullivan	NPA	Councillor
Nancy Chiavario	NPA	Councillor
Craig Hemer	NPA	Councillor
Jenny Kwan	COPE	Councillor

=== 1990–1993 ===
Name	Party	Position
Gordon Campbell	NPA	Mayor
Don Bellamy	NPA	Councillor
Tung Chan	NPA	Councillor
Libby Davies	COPE	Councillor
Bruce Eriksen	COPE	Councillor
Philip Owen	NPA	Councillor
Gordon Price	NPA	Councillor
George Puil	NPA	Councillor
Harry Rankin	COPE	Councillor
Patricia Wilson	COPE	Councillor
Bruce Yorke (until 1992)	COPE	Councillor
Lynne Kennedy (from 1992)	NPA	Councillor

=== 1988–1990 ===
Elected in the 1988 municipal election

Name	Party	Position
Gordon Campbell	NPA	Mayor
Carole Taylor	Independent	Councillor
Jonathan Baker	NPA	Councillor
Don Bellamy	NPA	Councillor
Libby Davies	COPE	Councillor
George Puil	NPA	Councillor
Philip Owen	NPA	Councillor
Harry Rankin	COPE	Councillor
Gordon Price	NPA	Councillor
Bruce Eriksen	COPE	Councillor
Sandra Wilking	NPA	Councillor

=== 1986–1988 ===
Elected in the 1986 municipal election

Name	Party	Position
Gordon Campbell	NPA	Mayor
George Puil	NPA	Councillor
Don Bellamy	NPA	Councillor
Jonathan Baker	NPA	Councillor
Philip Owen	NPA	Councillor
Helen Boyce	NPA	Councillor
Carole Taylor	Independent	Councillor
Libby Davies	COPE	Councillor
Ralph Caravetta	NPA	Councillor
Gordon Price	NPA	Councillor
Bruce Eriksen	COPE	Councillor

=== 1984–1986 ===
Elected in the 1984 municipal election

Name	Party	Position
Mike Harcourt	Civic Independents	Mayor
Harry Rankin	COPE	Councillor
Bill Yee	Civic Independents	Councillor
May Brown	TEAM	Councillor
George Puil	NPA	Councillor
Bruce Eriksen	COPE	Councillor
Don Bellamy	NPA	Councillor
Gordon Campbell	NPA	Councillor
Libby Davies	COPE	Councillor
Marguerite Ford	TEAM	Councillor
Bruce Yorke	COPE	Councillor

=== 1982–1984 ===
Elected in the 1982 municipal election

Name	Party	Position
Mike Harcourt	Independent (NDP)	Mayor
Harry Rankin	COPE	Councillor
May Brown	TEAM	Councillor
George Puil	NPA	Councillor
Bruce Eriksen	COPE	Councillor
Marguerite Ford	TEAM	Councillor
Don Bellamy	NPA	Councillor
Bill Yee	Independent (NDP)	Councillor
Bruce Yorke	COPE	Councillor
Libby Davies	COPE	Councillor
Warnett Kennedy	NPA	Councillor

=== 1980–1982 ===
Elected in the 1980 municipal election

Name	Party	Position
Mike Harcourt	Independent	Mayor
Harry Rankin	COPE	Councillor
May Brown	TEAM	Councillor
Bruce Eriksen	COPE	Councillor
Marguerite Ford	TEAM	Councillor
George Puil	NPA	Councillor
Helen Boyce	NPA	Councillor
Warnett Kennedy	NPA	Councillor
Bruce Yorke	COPE	Councillor
Don Bellamy	NPA	Councillor
Nathan Divinsky	NPA	Councillor

=== 1978–1980 ===
Elected in the 1978 municipal election

Name	Party	Position
Jack Volrich	Independent (NPA-backed)	Mayor
Warnett Kennedy	NPA	Councillor
George Puil	NPA	Councillor
Bernice Gerard	NPA	Councillor
Helen Boyce	NPA	Councillor
Doug Little	NPA	Councillor
Don Bellamy	Independent (NPA-backed)	Councillor
Harry Rankin	COPE	Councillor
Mike Harcourt	Independent	Councillor
Darlene Marzari	Independent	Councillor
Marguerite Ford	TEAM	Councillor

=== 1976–1978 ===
Elected in the 1976 municipal election

Name	Party	Position
Jack Volrich	TEAM	Mayor
Harry Rankin	COPE	Councillor
May Brown	TEAM	Councillor
Mike Harcourt	Independent	Councillor
Darlene Marzari	Independent	Councillor
Warnett Kennedy	NPA	Councillor
George Puil	NPA	Councillor
Marguerite Ford	TEAM	Councillor
Bernice Gerard	NPA	Councillor
Bill Gibson	TEAM	Councillor
Don Bellamy	TEAM	Councillor

=== 1974–1976 ===
Elected in the 1974 municipal election

Name	Party	Position
Art Phillips	TEAM	Mayor
Mike Harcourt	TEAM	Councillor
Fritz Bowers	TEAM	Councillor
Harry Rankin	COPE	Councillor
Jack Volrich	TEAM	Councillor
Warnett Kennedy	NPA	Councillor
Helen Boyce	NPA	Councillor
Hugh Bird	NPA	Councillor
Darlene Marzari	TEAM	Councillor
Ed Sweeney	NPA	Councillor
Art Cowie	TEAM	Councillor

=== 1973–1974 ===
Elected in the 1972 municipal election

Name	Party	Position
Art Phillips	TEAM	Mayor
Walter Hardwick	TEAM	Councillor
Harry Rankin	COPE	Councillor
Mike Harcourt	TEAM	Councillor
Bill Gibson	TEAM	Councillor
Geoffrey Massey	TEAM	Councillor
Jack Volrich	TEAM	Councillor
Fritz Bowers	TEAM	Councillor
Darlene Marzari	TEAM	Councillor
Marianne Linnell	NPA	Councillor
Setty Pendakur	TEAM	Councillor

=== 1971–1972 ===
Elected in the 1970 municipal election

Name	Party	Position
Tom Campbell	NPA	Mayor
Harry Rankin	COPE	Councillor
Marianne Linnell	NPA	Councillor
Brian Calder	TEAM	Councillor
Walter Hardwick	TEAM	Councillor
Art Phillips	TEAM	Councillor
Earle Adams	NPA	Councillor
Hugh Bird	NPA	Councillor
Ed Sweeney	NPA	Councillor
Ernie Broome	NPA	Councillor
Halford Wilson	NPA	Councillor

=== 1969–1970 ===
Elected in the 1968 municipal election

Name	Party	Position
Tom Campbell	NPA	Mayor
Hugh Bird	NPA	Councillor
Marianne Linnell	NPA	Councillor
Ed Sweeney	NPA	Councillor
Harry Rankin	COPE	Councillor
Earle Adams	NPA	Councillor
Halford Wilson	NPA	Councillor
Ernie Broome	NPA	Councillor
Walter Hardwick	TEAM	Councillor
Brian Calder	NPA	Councillor
Everett Crowley	NPA	Councillor

=== 1967–1968 ===
Elected in the 1966 municipal election

Name	Party	Position
Tom Campbell	Independent	Mayor
Hugh Bird	NPA	Councillor
Halford Wilson	NPA-CAA	Councillor
Harry Rankin	Independent Labour	Councillor
Earle Adams	NPA	Councillor
Marianne Linnell	NPA	Councillor
Ernie Broome	NPA-CAA	Councillor
Reg Atherton	NPA-CAA	Councillor
Peter Graham	NPA	Councillor
Ed Sweeney	NPA	Councillor
Tom Alsbury	CAA	Councillor
