= Tom Campbell (Canadian politician) =

Canadian politician

Tom Campbell QC
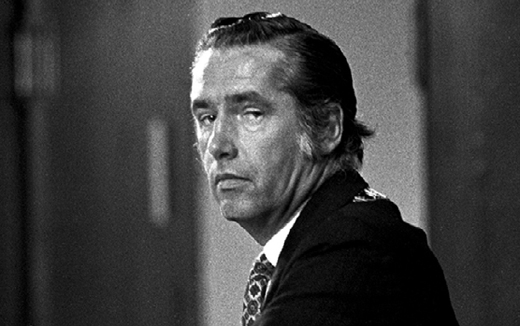

31st Mayor of Vancouver
- In office 1966–1972
- Preceded by: William Rathie
- Succeeded by: Art Phillips

Personal details
- Born: October 5, 1927 Vancouver, British Columbia
- Died: January 27, 2012 (aged 84)
- Party: Non-Partisan Association(after 1968)
- Other political affiliations: Civic Voter's Association (1960), Independent (1961–1968)
- Spouse: Julie Campbell
- Children: 3
- Profession: Lawyer

Thomas J. Campbell, QC (October 5, 1927 – January 27, 2012) was a Canadian politician, who served as the 31st mayor of Vancouver, British Columbia from 1967 through 1972.

Campbell was born in Vancouver, where he became a lawyer. In 1962, he joined Vancouver City Council as an alderman, representing the Non-Partisan Association (NPA), a conservative civic party. Running as an independent, Campbell beat out William Rathie in the 1966 election, ending the NPA's long, unbroken domination of city hall. In 1970, he won the NPA nod to replace Rathie as the party's mayoral nominee and again won the mayor's office.

As mayor, "Tom Terrific" (as he was both affectionately and derisively called) proved to be brash, confrontational, and controversial. During his term, the City held a referendum which authorized the then-controversial development of an underground shopping mall and office towers, now known as Pacific Centre, Vancouver's largest development. As the Lower Mainland's population topped one million, Campbell took an assertively pro-development stance, advocating a freeway that would cut through a large part of Downtown Eastside, the demolition of the historic Carnegie Centre, and the construction of a luxury hotel at the entrance of Stanley Park (the Bayshore Inn) and another at the north foot of Burrard in which it turned out the mayor had invested (it is now an apartment building and never became a hotel).

Campbell was a vocal supporter of the Social Credit government of Premier W.A.C. Bennett. Campbell was re-elected in the 1968 and 1970 elections by large majorities.

It is, however, Campbell's confrontations with the city's burgeoning youth counterculture for which he is best remembered. They included attempts to suppress and shut down the alternative newspaper, The Georgia Straight, whose editor Dan McLeod was repeatedly beaten by city police and the blocking of the final concert of the 1970 Festival Express rock and roll tour, which was held in Calgary to avoid risking a confrontation with the Vancouver mayor's stated intention to use police to stop the festival. There was even an incident in August, 1971, when Vancouver police charged on horseback into a group of about a thousand hippies having a "smoke-in" on the streets of Gastown. That came to be known as the Gastown Riots and led to the arrests of 79 people, of whom 38 were charged with various offences. A judicial inquiry later criticized the action, characterizing it as a police riot.

Campbell chose not to run for re-election in November 1972 and returned to private life and legal practice. He died in 2012.
