= Carnegie Community Centre =

Public library in Vancouver, British Columbia

Coordinates: 49.281°N 123.100°W

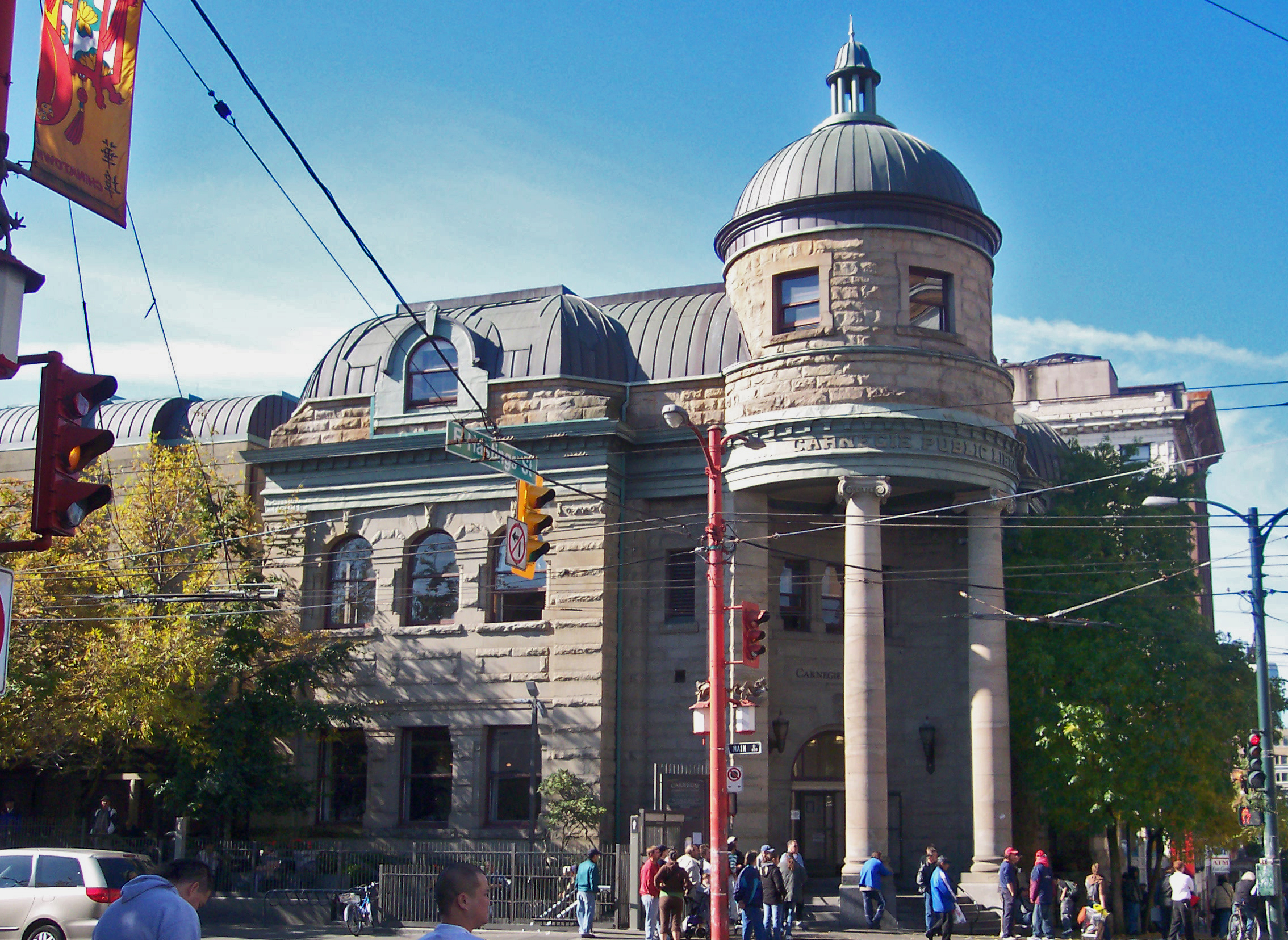
Carnegie Centre

Carnegie Community Centre is located at 401 Main Street at the corner of Hastings Street, in the old Carnegie Public Library building in the Downtown Eastside of Vancouver, British Columbia.

In 1901 Vancouver requested $50,000 from industrialist and philanthropist Andrew Carnegie for the purpose of building a library. Carnegie agreed, provided the City of Vancouver supplied the site and contributed $5000 a year. The original public library was completed in 1903. For decades, the top floor was the home of the Vancouver Museum. The Vancouver Public Library moved into a more spacious building at 750 Burrard Street in 1957 and the Carnegie building eventually fell into disrepair.

Neighbourhood poverty activists from the Downtown Eastside Residents' Association convinced city council to turn it into a public space for local residents, and it opened as the Carnegie Community Centre in the 1980s. It now houses recreation facilities, a low-cost cafeteria, a branch of the Vancouver Public Library, and a variety of services and programs for the neighbourhood, which is one of the poorest in Canada. The Carnegie Centre is a drug- and alcohol-free place.

The Carnegie Community Centre is owned by the City of Vancouver and funded by the Social Planning Department. It is open 9 a.m. to 11 p.m., every day of the year.

The centre is run by Vancouver City Staff in cooperation with the board of directors of the Carnegie Community Centre Association, a non-profit society. Directors are elected annually from the members of the association. Membership costs one dollar per year and is available to neighbourhood residents. All the centre's programs are free to members.

Carnegie Community Centre has a gymnasium, a weight room, a theatre (aptly named Carnegie Hall), a cafeteria with very reasonably priced meals, a seniors lounge and a pool room. There is also an Adult Learning Centre on the top floor, which provides informal one-on-one tutoring. There is a computer lab containing multiple computers for educational use located inside the centre as well.

The Carnegie Centre publishes a bi-monthly newsletter with articles concerning the Downtown Eastside Community. The Institute for stained glass in Canada has documented the stained glass at Carnegie Community Centre.

The Carnegie Centre supports and provides a home for a number of projects, including the political group known as CCAP (Carnegie Community Action Project), which has been associated with the 2013 anti-gentrification protests in the DTES. On April 11th, 2013 Gena Thompson, president of the Carnegie Community Centre Association, issued a statement intended to clarify its role in anti-gentrification actions. The statement reads, in part:

There has been considerable confusion in the media and in the public eye about our project, the Carnegie Community Action Project (CCAP), and its role in the various anti-gentrification actions currently underway in the DTES. We formed CCAP 17 years ago to be a research and advocacy organization whose goal is to track the real effects of poverty and gentrification on low-income DTES people, and to seek to protect and expand the assets and tenure of the low-income community in the neighbourhood.

== In popular culture ==
The Carnegie Community Centre is mentioned in the lyrics rapped by C.R. Avery in the song Take the Long Way by the Canadian folk music group Po' Girl from their 2004 album Vagabond Lullabies.
