= A. Thomas Alsbury =

Canadian politician, educator, and soccer player

Albert Thomas Alsbury

29th Mayor of Vancouver
- In office 1959–1962
- Preceded by: Frederick Hume
- Succeeded by: William Rathie

Personal details
- Born: Albert Thomas Alsbury; 21 April 1904 Edinburgh, Scotland
- Died: 21 July 1990 (aged 86) Burnaby, British Columbia, Canada
- Party: Non-Partisan Association
- Children: Thomas Bruce Alsbury, Diane Wiesner (née:Alsbury)
- Education: University of British Columbia
- Profession: Athlete, Educator
Association football career
- Position: Goalkeeper
Senior career*
Years	Team	Apps	(Gls)
- Vancouver St. Saviours
- * Club domestic league appearances and goals

Albert Thomas Alsbury (21 April 1904 – 21 July 1990) was a Canadian politician, educator, and soccer player. He served as the 29th mayor of Vancouver, British Columbia from 1959 to 1962 and was a goalkeeper in the Pacific Coast League from the 1920s through to the early 1940s.

Alsbury was born in Edinburgh, Scotland after which he moved to Vancouver in 1907. He studied education at the University of British Columbia, where he received a degree. He was later a vice-principal at Grandview High School of Commerce in Vancouver, before the school and himself were relocated to Vancouver Technical Secondary School.

Alsbury defeated Frederick Hume by 11,000 votes to become mayor. He left this office after 1962 and then worked for the University of British Columbia, although by that time his policies led to the loss of support from the Non-Partisan Association.

As Mayor in 1959, Alsbury helped kick off the new Pacific Coast Soccer League season at Callister Park.

Alsbury formed the senior citizen advocacy group Pensioners for Action Now in 1972. Alsbury became a recipient of the Civic Merit Award on June 28, 1983.
