= Jack Volrich =

Canadian politician

33rd Mayor of Vancouver
- In office 1976–1980
- Preceded by: Art Phillips
- Succeeded by: Mike Harcourt
- Constituency: Vancouver

Vancouver City Councillor
- In office 1972–1976

Personal details
- Born: February 27, 1928
- Died: May 31, 2010 (aged 82)

Jack J. Volrich (February 27, 1928 – May 31, 2010) was born in Anyox, British Columbia and was the 33rd mayor of Vancouver, British Columbia, Canada from 1977 to 1980.

== Biography ==
Prior to being elected mayor, Volrich practised law and served as an alderman on the Vancouver City Council. He started his political career with the municipal political party, TEAM. However, he left TEAM during his first term as mayor and ran successfully as an independent with the endorsement of the more conservative NPA (Non-Partisan Association) in the 1978 election. He was defeated in an upset in 1980 by Michael Harcourt. Harcourt was a fellow former TEAM member who would go on to become premier of British Columbia. Important issues during Volrich's tenure as mayor included the proposed construction of a trade and convention centre and the debate over the ward system method of electing aldermen to city council.

Volrich resumed practising law, but returned to the political world when he ran unsuccessfully as a Progressive Conservative Party candidate for Parliament in the electoral district of Vancouver East in the 1984 election. In 1992–1993, he was an organizer for and supporter of David Varty, a candidate for the federal Liberal Party nomination in the electoral district of Vancouver Centre.
