= Jim Green (Canadian politician) =

American-Canadian academic and politician (1943–2012)

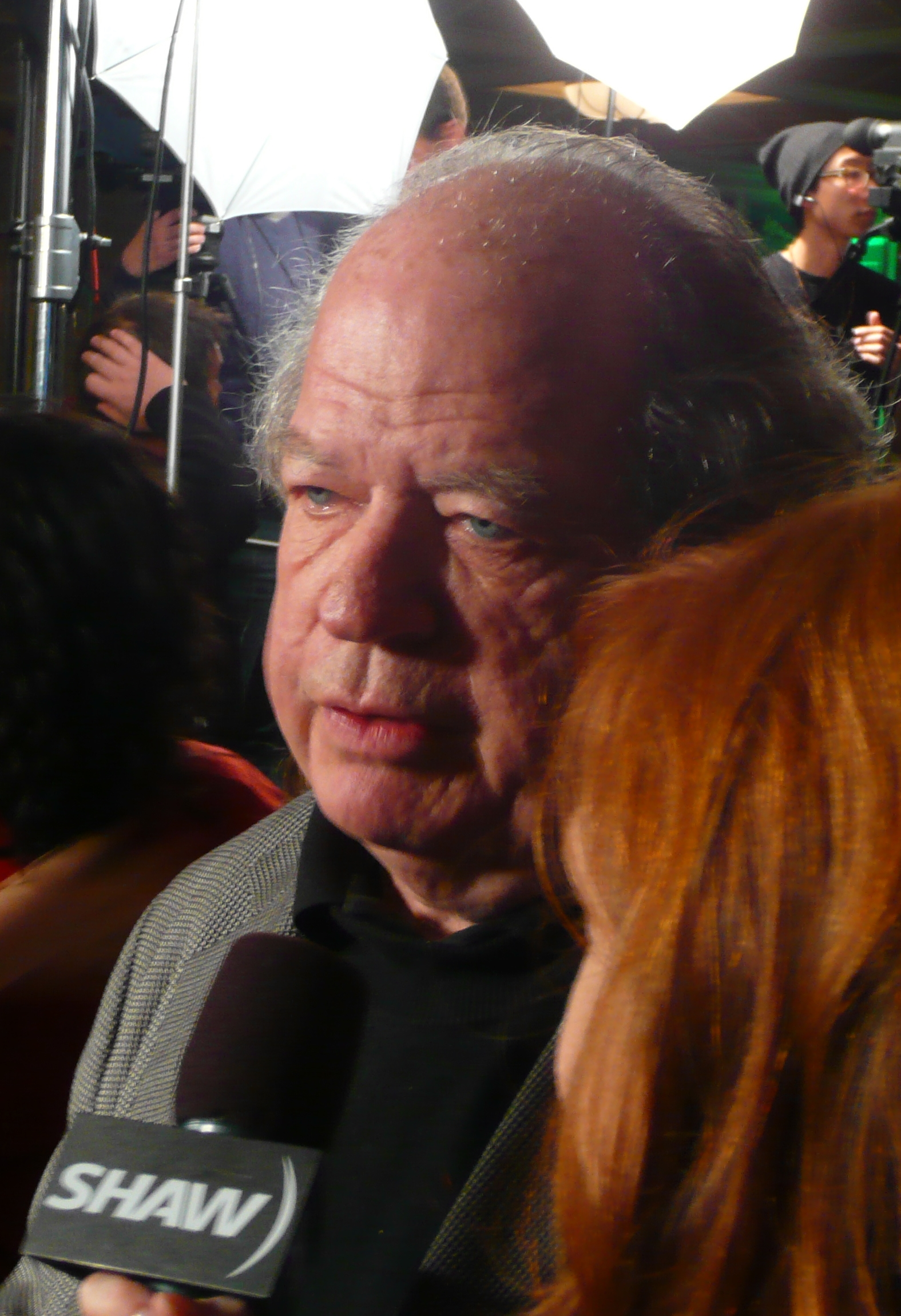
- Green in 2009

Vancouver City Councillor
- In office December 2, 2002 – December 5, 2005

Personal details
- Born: May 25, 1943 Birmingham, Alabama
- Died: February 28, 2012 (aged 68) Vancouver, British Columbia
- Party: Coalition of Progressive Electors, Vision Vancouver
- Education: University of British Columbia, University of South Carolina
- Occupation: Academic, politician

Jim Green (May 25, 1943 – February 28, 2012) was an American-Canadian longshoreman, taxicab driver, community activist, non-profit housing developer, municipal politician, university instructor and development consultant.

== Early life and education ==
Born in Birmingham, Alabama, Green moved to Canada to avoid being drafted for the Vietnam War. Green held a Masters in Anthropology from the University of British Columbia, a Bachelor of Arts from the University of South Carolina, and studied at the Sorbonne, the Millennium Film Institute in New York, and the University of Colorado.

== Career ==
Early in his career, Green worked as a longshoreman and a taxicab driver.

Green was an advocate for the city's Downtown Eastside and led the development of many social housing projects, including the experimental Woodward's Building redevelopment designed by architect Gregory Henriquez He was a development consultant for developers and non-profit community groups. In 2009 he left his role as CEO of the Misty Isles Economic Development Society to take a position working with Millennium Developments Ltd. on the 2010 Olympic Village development in Vancouver.

Green taught opera and architecture at the University of British Columbia and Anthropology at Simon Fraser University, and co-founded the University of British Columbia Urban Field School. Green was the 1996 recipient of UBC's Great Trekker Award, given by the students to an alumnus who has achieved distinction in their career. Green was chair of Four Corners Community Savings, which was closed by the Gordon Campbell led BC Government. He served on the board of the Federation of Canadian Municipalities.

Green co-founded the Portland Hotel Society which operates Insite, the first legal safe injection site in North America.

== Political career ==
In 2002 he was elected to Vancouver City Council as a member of the Coalition of Progressive Electors (COPE), and subsequently, with mayor Larry Campbell, councillor Raymond Louie, and councillor Tim Stevenson left to form a new party, Vision Vancouver. Under the Vision Vancouver banner, he unsuccessfully ran for mayor in 2005, losing to Sam Sullivan by 3,747 votes. Some blamed voter confusion for his loss, as there was an unknown candidate named "James Green" who received 4,273 votes.

It was the second time Green had run for mayor unsuccessfully, having been beaten as a member of COPE by then-NPA mayor Gordon Campbell in 1990. Six years later, Green again faced Campbell, this time in the 1996 provincial election for the MLA seat in Vancouver-Point Grey. Green, a New Democrat, was defeated by BC Liberal leader and future premier Gordon Campbell 12,637 to 11,074.

In 2008, Green supported Gregor Robertson in his successful run for mayor of Vancouver.

== Death ==
In February 2012, his family released a brief statement saying he had suffered a serious recurrence of the lung cancer. At 06:15 PST on February 28, 2012, Green died of his illness.

== Electoral record ==
2005 Vancouver municipal election: Mayor
Party	Candidate	Votes	%	Elected
NPA	Sam Sullivan	61,543	47.34	✓
Vision	Jim Green	57,796	44.45	
Independent	James Green	4,273	3.29	
Work Less	Ben West	1,907	1.47	
Independent	Scott Yee	688	0.53	
Interest	Austin Spencer	456	0.35	
Independent	Pedro Mora	443	0.34	
Independent	Gölök Zoltán Buday	384	0.30	
Independent	John Landry Gray	355	0.27	
Independent	Mike Hansen	304	0.23	
Independent	Darrell Zimmerman	283	0.22	
Independent	Frank D'Agostino	275	0.21	
Independent	Ian W. Simpson	246	0.19	
Independent	Arthur Crossman	219	0.17	
Independent	Grant Chancey	198	0.15	
Independent	Ray Power	171	0.13	
Independent	Peter Raymond Haskell	144	0.11	
Independent	Malcolm G. MacLeod	140	0.11	
Independent	Joe Hatoum	96	0.07	
Independent	Eliot Esti	90	0.07	
Total votes		130,011	100.00	
NPA gain from COPE		Swing		–
