= Art Phillips =

Canadian politician

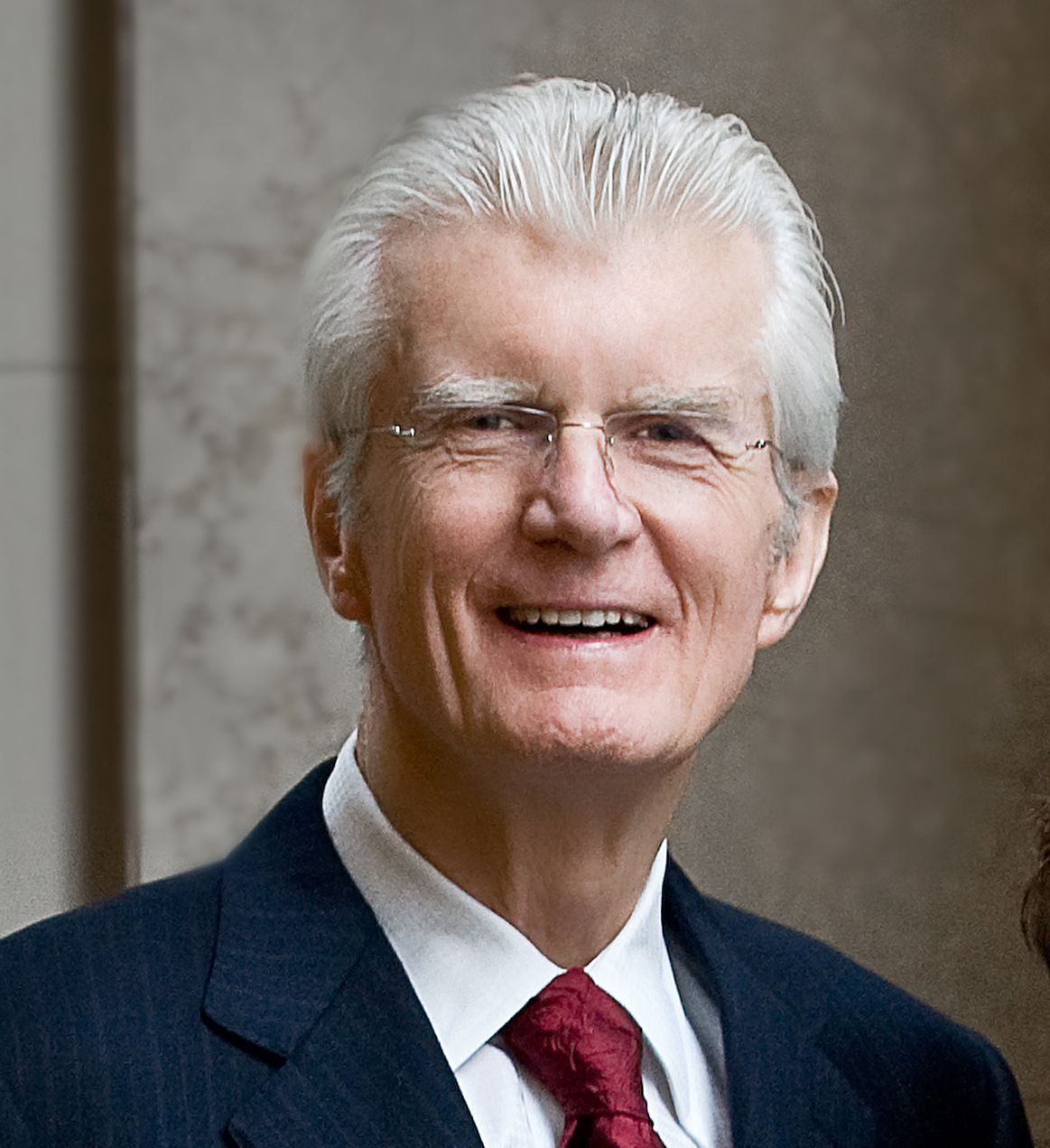

Member of Parliament for Vancouver Centre
- In office May 22, 1979 – February 17, 1980
- Preceded by: Ron Basford
- Succeeded by: Pat Carney

32nd Mayor of Vancouver
- In office 1973–1976
- Preceded by: Tom Campbell
- Succeeded by: Jack Volrich

Personal details
- Born: Arthur Phillips; September 12, 1930 Montreal, Quebec, Canada
- Died: March 29, 2013 (aged 82) Vancouver, British Columbia, Canada
- Party: Liberal
- Spouse(s): Patricia Phillips, Carole Taylor
- Children: 6
- Education: University of British Columbia (BCom)
- Profession: Investment analyst

Arthur Phillips (September 12, 1930 – March 29, 2013) served as the 32nd mayor of Vancouver, British Columbia, Canada from 1973 to 1977. Prior to being elected to this post, he founded the Vancouver investment firm of Phillips, Hager & North. Phillips was instrumental in founding a reform-minded, centrist municipal-level political party, TEAM (The Electors' Action Movement), in 1968. Also in that year, he was elected as an alderman to Vancouver City Council.

Under Phillips' mayoral leadership, the city of Vancouver took a more cautious approach to real estate and related development and ensured that environmental and quality-of-life concerns were addressed by city planners.

Phillips was elected to the Parliament of Canada in 1979 as a Liberal, but was defeated the following year in his bid for re-election. After Phillips' defeat, he returned to private life at his investment firm. By 2007, Phillips, Hager & North had become a leading investment firm on the west coast, with over $66 billion of assets under management.

His wife, Carole Taylor, served as a Vancouver alderman in the 1980s and then as chair of the Canadian Broadcasting Corporation. In the 2005 British Columbia election she won election to the British Columbia Legislative Assembly as a Liberal and was subsequently appointed Minister of Finance in Gordon Campbell's cabinet.

During his undergraduate years at the University of British Columbia (B.Com., 1953), Phillips was a member of the British Columbia Alpha chapter of the Phi Delta Theta fraternity and was their chapter President in 1950.

== Electoral history ==
1980 Canadian federal election: Vancouver Centre
Party	Candidate	Votes	%	±%
Progressive Conservative	Pat Carney	16,462	35.27	+0.84
New Democratic	Ron Johnson	14,830	31.77	+1.80
Liberal	Art Phillips	14,667	31.42	−3.22
Rhinoceros	David J. Longworth	337	0.72	–
Communist	Jack Phillips	200	0.43	+0.18
Independent	John Elliot	101	0.22	−0.38
Independent	Paul Watson	54	0.12	–
Marxist–Leninist	Greg Corcoran	24	0.05	−0.06
Total valid votes		46,675	100.0	
Progressive Conservative gain from Liberal		Swing		−0.48
lop.parl.ca

1979 Canadian federal election: Vancouver Centre
Party	Candidate	Votes	%	±%
Liberal	Art Phillips	15,430	34.64	−7.09
Progressive Conservative	Pat Carney	15,335	34.43	−3.10
New Democratic	Ron Johnson	13,350	29.97	+10.58
Independent	John Elliot	267	0.60	–
Communist	Bert Ogden	111	0.25	−0.22
Marxist–Leninist	Greg Corcoran	48	0.11	−0.20
Total valid votes		44,541	100.0	
Liberal hold		Swing		−2.00
