= Harry Rankin =

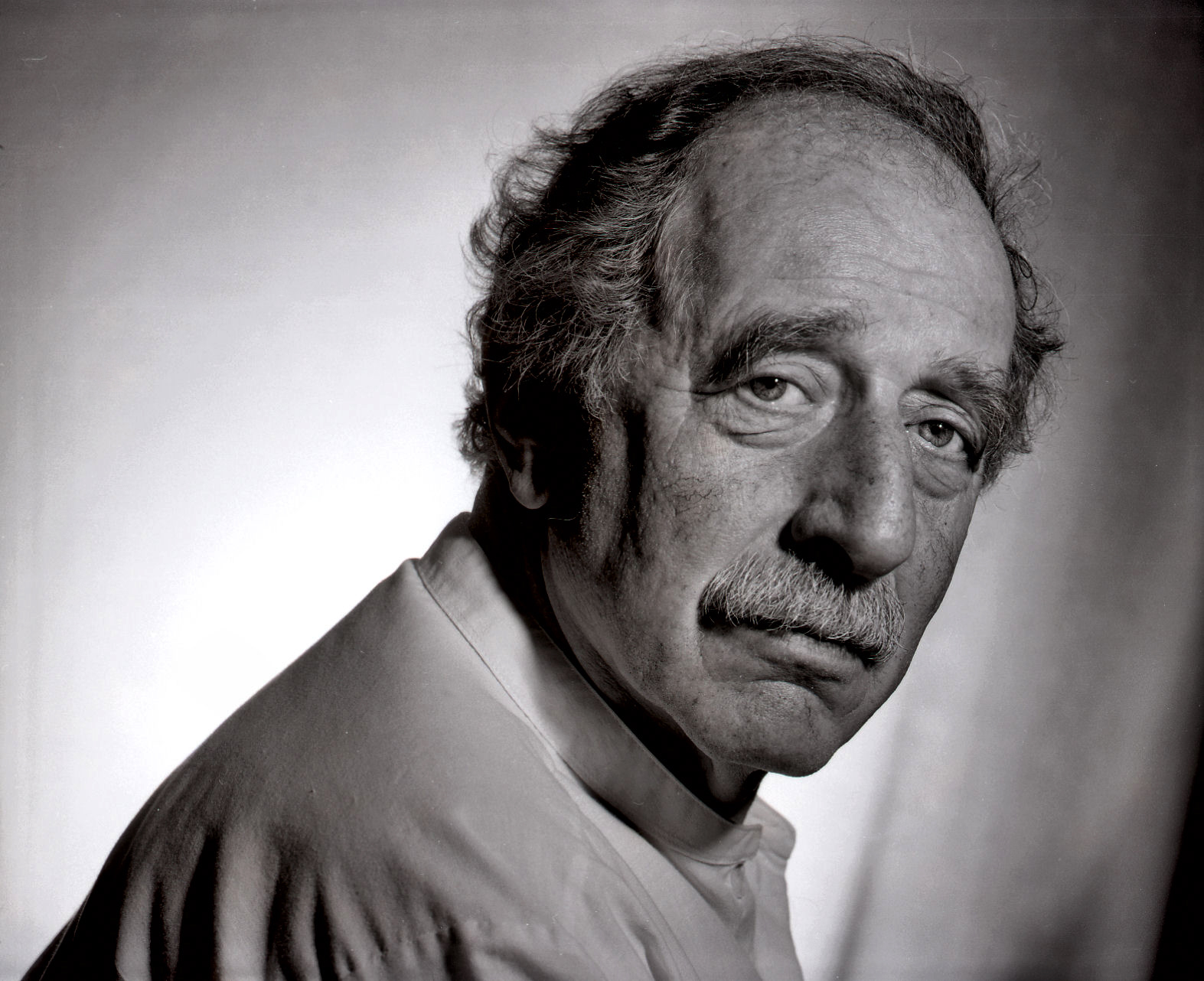
Harry Rankin circa September 1987

Harry Rankin (May 8, 1920 – February 26, 2002) was a Vancouver lawyer and long-term member of Vancouver City Council.

== Early life ==
Rankin was born in Vancouver to secular Jewish immigrants from Ukraine. His father worked at a factory, while his mother grew up in a working class Jewish community in Glasgow, Scotland.

At 14, Rankin dropped out of secondary school to work in a bakery and through the trade union he got involved in politics. During World War II, he served in the Canadian Army with Vancouver's Seaforth Highlanders of Canada. He attained the rank of sergeant and was wounded on 23 May 1944 during the Battle of the Hitler Line.

== Legal career ==
After the war, he completed his secondary education and pursued undergraduate studies at the University of British Columbia (UBC), where he also earned a law degree. During his time at UBC, he joined the Communist University Club, briefly serving as its vice-president.

Communists were banned from joining the bar and the Law Society of British Columbia interviewed Rankin at length prior to admitting him to the bar about his views on God, whether he would defend his country if attacked, and whether he was a member of the Communist Party of Canada, then called the Labor-Progressive Party, something he was able to deny as the Communist University Club was an independent and unaffiliated organization. In the wake of the Law Society refusing to admit Gordon Martin to the bar on account of his being an avowed communist, Rankin had to sign a declaration that he was not a communist prior to being allowed to join. He went on to become head of the Law Society in 1979 (a position then known as Treasurer, later known as President).

As a lawyer, Rankin fought for and helped establish the province's legal aid system. In 1950 he was one of the founding members of a committee that created a list of lawyers who were willing to take on cases, mostly pro bono, preceding the establishment of the BC Legal Aid Society by 20 years.

Rankin worked as a criminal lawyer and labour lawyer, and he spent a significant amount of time working for First Nations clients, most notably in the much-publicised case of Fred Quilt.

== Political career ==
Rankin ran for office more than a dozen times before being elected to the Vancouver City Council in 1966 as the sole independent alderman on a council dominated by the conservative Non-Partisan Association. Vancouver's aldermen were elected through an "at large" system rather than by ward, meaning voters from wealthier neighbourhoods were able to monopolise council elections and that only candidates who could afford a citywide campaign had a chance of being elected. Rankin helped form the Committee of Progressive Electors (COPE) as a left wing civic political party and it subsequently pushed for a ward-based electoral system to be introduced in Vancouver, culminating in a referendum in October 1973, at which the ward proposal was defeated.

Rankin was a 20-year veteran of city council when he ran for mayor in 1986, losing to Gordon Campbell. He returned to city council as an alderman in the subsequent election and remained on the body until his retirement from politics in 1993. Connie Fogal

== Personal life ==
Rankin married a divorcée with four sons; they had a son, Phil Rankin, who went on to become a lawyer, and a daughter, Rosemary Rankin.

His widow, Connie Fogal, is the former leader of the Canadian Action Party. His son, Phil Rankin, is lawyer and advocate for legal aid. His grandson, Micah Rankin, is a Judge of the Provincial Court of British Columbia and a former law professor at the Thompson Rivers University Faculty of Law. His nephew, Lee Rankin, is a lawyer, a long-time councillor in Burnaby, British Columbia, and was a Liberal candidate in the 2000 federal election and a BC Liberal candidate in the 2009 provincial election.

Rankin died from a heart attack on February 26, 2002, aged 81.

Rankin was the subject of the 2018 documentary The Rankin File: Legacy of a Radical, written and directed by Teresa Alfeld. The film explores Rankin's life and legacy, as well as the 1986 mayoral election between him and Gordon Campbell. The film premiered at the DOXA Documentary Film Festival in Vancouver.
