= 1999 Vancouver municipal election =

- November 20, 1999

11 seats in Vancouver City Council
- Turnout: 36.8% ▲4.7 pp
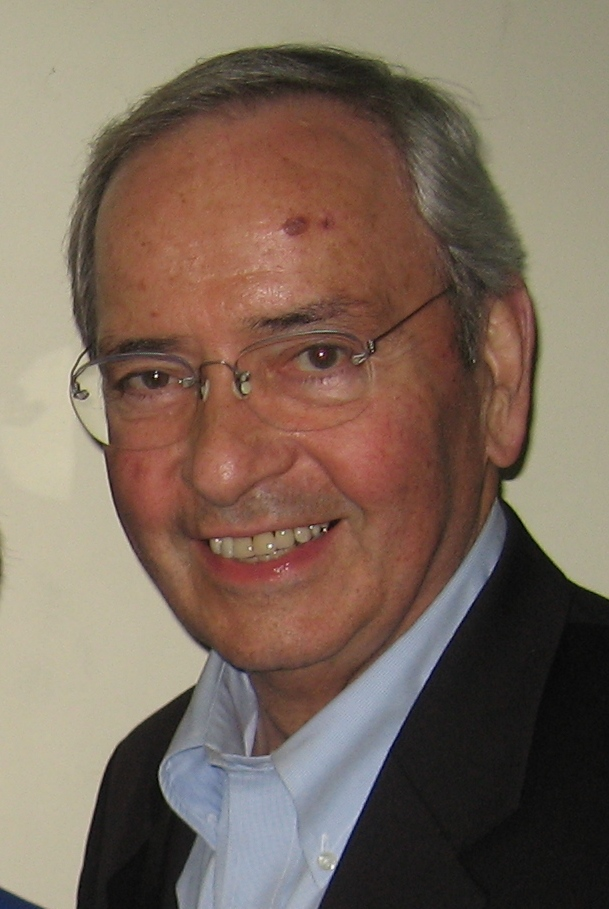

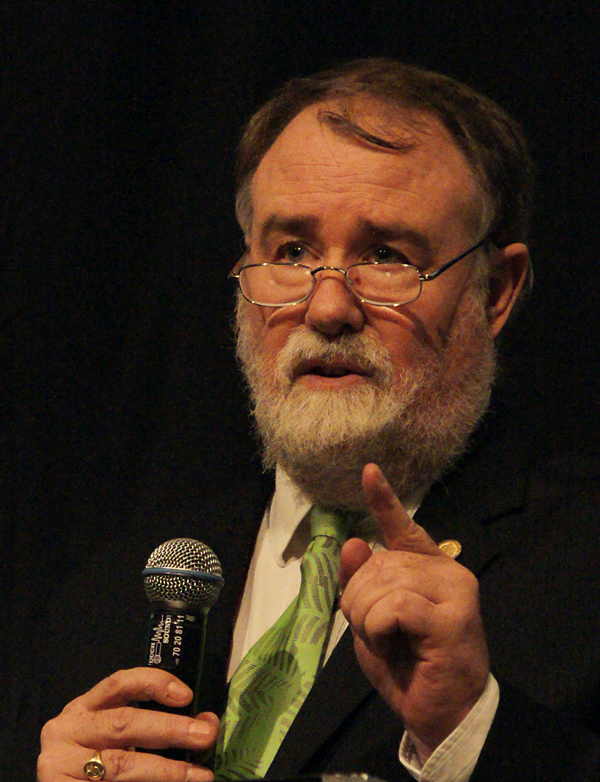
	First party	Second party
Leader	Philip Owen	David Cadman
Party	NPA	COPE
Seats won	9	2
Seat change	▼2	▲2
Popular vote	51,085	33,506
Percentage	54.19%	35.54%
- Mayoral results by voting division
Mayor before election
Philip Owen
NPA
Elected mayor
Philip Owen
NPA

The city of Vancouver, Canada, held municipal elections on November 20, 1999. Canadian citizens who were over 18 years of age at the time of the vote, and had been a resident of Vancouver for the previous 30 days and a resident of B.C. for the previous six months, were able to vote for candidates in four races that were presented on one ballot.

Overall, 97 candidates filed for election, but two dropped out. There were 95 candidates at election time. There were 256,361 registered voters, and 94,271 votes cast for a voter turnout of 36.77 per cent.

The ballot elected one mayor, 10 councillors, nine school board trustees and seven park board commissioners. Each elector could vote for as many candidates as there were open seats (e.g., an elector could vote for ten or fewer councillors). Two borrowing questions were on the ballot, and both passed by a margin of 70 per cent or more.

In an effort to prevent a repeat of the 1996 election that saw many joke candidates register because there was no nomination filing fee, city council adopted a bylaw on September 15, 1999, requiring candidates to pay a nominal $100 fee. The bylaw had the intended effect, but at least two people, going by the names "T. Raax" and "Dr. Evil", did put up the fees and consequently ran as mayoral candidates.

The Green Party and the Coalition of Progressive Electors mounted a combined slate of candidates but ran a single mayoral candidate.

== Elections to Vancouver City Council ==
=== Overall council results ===
All figures include votes cast for both mayor and councillors but not school and park board. * Denotes incumbent.

Party	Party leader or mayoral candidate	# of candidates	Council seats				Total popular vote		
Party	Party leader or mayoral candidate	# of candidates	1996	Before election	Elected	Change	#	%	Change
NPA	Philip Owen	10	10		8	−2			
COPE	David Cadman	5	0		2	+2			
Green	No leader	3	2	-					
CIVIC	Jamie Lee Hamilton	4	-	-	-				
Independent			-	-	-				
Total					10	-		100.0	-

=== Mayoralty election ===
One to be elected.

Candidate	Party	Votes	%
Philip Owen *	NPA	51,085	54.19
David Cadman	COPE	33,506	35.54
Man-Kit Kwan	Independent	2,213	
Dr. Evil	Independent	1,434	
Court Ray Caldwell	Independent	784	
Gord D. Waddell	Independent	764	
Bill Ritchie	Independent	721	
Corinna I. vanGerwen	NC	607	
T. Raax	Independent	462	
John (Eh) McGoldrick	Independent	398	
Shawn Ryan	Independent	352	

=== Councillors election ===
Ten to be elected.

Candidate	Party	Votes	%
Jennifer Clarke	NPA	42,815	45.52
Lynne Kennedy *	NPA	39,597	42.00
Daniel Lee *	NPA	39,001	41.37
Gordon H. Price *	NPA	38,746	41.10
George Puil *	NPA	38,551	40.89
Don Lee *	NPA	37,164	39.42
Sandy McCormick	NPA	35,252	37.39
Sam C. Sullivan *	NPA	34,858	36.98
Fred Bass	COPE	33,156	35.17
Tim Louis	COPE	32,862	34.86
Nancy A. Chiavario	Independent	29,800	
Janet C. Leduc	NPA	29,306	
Raymond P. Louie	COPE	27,788	
Ann Livingston	Green	27,425	
Bev Ballantyne	Green	26,954	
Andrea Rolls	COPE	26,544	
Bud Osborn	COPE	25,244	
Baldev Dhugga	NPA	26,025	
Sid Chow Ming Fai Tan	Green	22,827	
Alan Herbert	Independent	16,987	
Wendy Turner	Independent	14,096	
Ye Chu	Independent	13,770	
Jamie Lee Hamilton	CIVIC	10,895	
Vincent Wong	Independent	10,397	
Helen Spiegelman	Independent	10,229	
Brian Buchanan	Independent	9,423	
James Wu	CA	9,202	
Michelle Jasmine Chang	Independent	8,885	
Pal B.McDonell	Independent	8,783	
Frances Wasserlein	Independent	8,326	
Ken Bregman	Independent	7,544	
Herman Hui	Independent	6,939	
Laurie McDonald	CIVIC	6,813	
Eligio Cabrera	CA	5,377	
Iain MacFarlane	Independent	5,087	
Greg Reid	Independent	4891	
Kevin Moore	CA	4,577	
Irene Louise Schmidt	CIVIC	4,260	
Jun Antonio	Independent	3,968	
Tyler G. Ducharme	CIVIC	3,905	
Sindi Addorisio	Independent	3,138	
Michael C. McLean	Independent	2,766	
Ryan (France) Warawa	Independent	2,570	

== Elections to the Vancouver Park Board ==
Seven to be elected.

Candidate	Party	Votes	%
Allan De Genova *	NPA	37,143	39.40
Dianne Ledingham	NPA	36,041	38.23
Duncan Wilson *	NPA	35,388	37.64
Laura McDiarmid *	NPA	35,480	37.64
Clarence Hansen	NPA	34,093	36.16
Christopher Richardson	NPA	32,322	34.29
Roslyn Mairi Cassells	Green	31,694	33.62
Colin Metcalfe	NPA	31,468	
Anita Romaniuk	COPE	31,110	
Michael Horn	Green	31,055	
Loretta Woodcock	COPE	31,038	
Dale Hoffman	Green	30,096	
Dan Rogers	COPE	30,661	
Munna Prasad	COPE	29,218	
Gabriel Yong	Independent	17,718	
Wendy Y.L. Lau	Independent	16,253	
Alan P. Fetherstonhaugh	Independent	12,648	
Jack Reid	Independent	9,787	
Anne Pepper	Independent	8,526	
Walter Schultz	Independent	6,169	
H. Rand Irwin	Independent	5,433	
Zdenky H.S. Burkhardt	Independent	4,863	

== Election to the Vancouver School Board ==
Ten to be elected.

Candidate	Party	Votes	%
Allan Wong	COPE	42,565	44.85
Allen Blakey	COPE	42,254	44.52
Bill Yuen *	NPA	40,895	43.09
Barbara Buchanan *	NPA	39,937	42.08
John Cheng *	NPA	39,791	41.92
Bill Brown *	NPA	39,758	41.89
Ted Hunt *	NPA	39,484	41.60
Ken Denike *	NPA	38,755	40.83
Adrienne Montani	COPE	38,584	40.65
Jane Bouey	COPE	38,385	
Noel Herron	COPE	37,867	
Mary Salvino	NPA	37,777	
Kelly Elizabeth White	Green	36,344	
John R. Robertson	NPA	35,082	
Robert Kiyoshk	COPE	31,843	
Vijay Singhera	NPA	31,272	
Tea Buechner	Green	30,840	
Hans-Joachim Grages	Green	28,847	
Thomas E. Deak	Independent	11,395	
