= GMHC =

New York City–based non-profit AIDS service organization

GMHC Health Services
- Founded: June 30, 1982; 44 years ago
- Founders: Nathan Fain; Larry Kramer; Lawrence D. Mass; Paul Popham; Paul Rapoport; Edmund White
- Type: nonprofit organization
- Tax ID no.: 13-3130146
- Legal status: 501(c)(3)
- Headquarters: New York City, U.S.
- Coordinates: 40.755067°N 73.992387°W
- Board Chair: Jonathan Mallow
- Chief Executive Officer: Kishani Chinniah-Moreno (Interim)
- Subsidiaries: GMHC Health Services _{(501(c)(3))}, Gay Men's Health Crisis Action _{(501(c)(4))}
- Revenue: $28,473,423 (2018)
- Expenses: $33,153,120 (2018)
- Employees: 301 (2018)
- Volunteers: 1,500 (2018)
- Formerly called: Gay Men's Health Crisis

The GMHC (formerly Gay Men's Health Crisis) is an American non-profit, volunteer-supported and community-based AIDS service organization whose mission statement is to "end the AIDS epidemic and uplift the lives of all affected." Founded in 1982, it is often billed as the "world's oldest AIDS service organization", as well as the "nation's oldest HIV/AIDS service organization."

== History ==
=== 1980s ===
In early 1981, reports began surfacing in San Francisco and New York City that a rare form of cancer called Kaposi's sarcoma was affecting young gay men. In response, 80 men gathered in New York writer Larry Kramer's apartment on August 11, 1981, to discuss the issue of "gay cancer" and to begin organizing efforts to raise money for research.

In January 1982, Nathan Fain, Lawrence D. Mass, Paul Popham, Paul Rapoport and Edmund White again met with Larry Kramer at his home and founded Gay Men's Health Crisis. GMHC took its name from the fact that the earliest men who fell victim to AIDS in the early 1980s were gay. The first meeting was held in the Church of St. Joseph in Greenwich Village. They organized the formal tax-exempt entity, which was incorporated on June 30, 1982. At the time, it was the largest volunteer AIDS organization in the world. Paul Popham was chosen as the president.

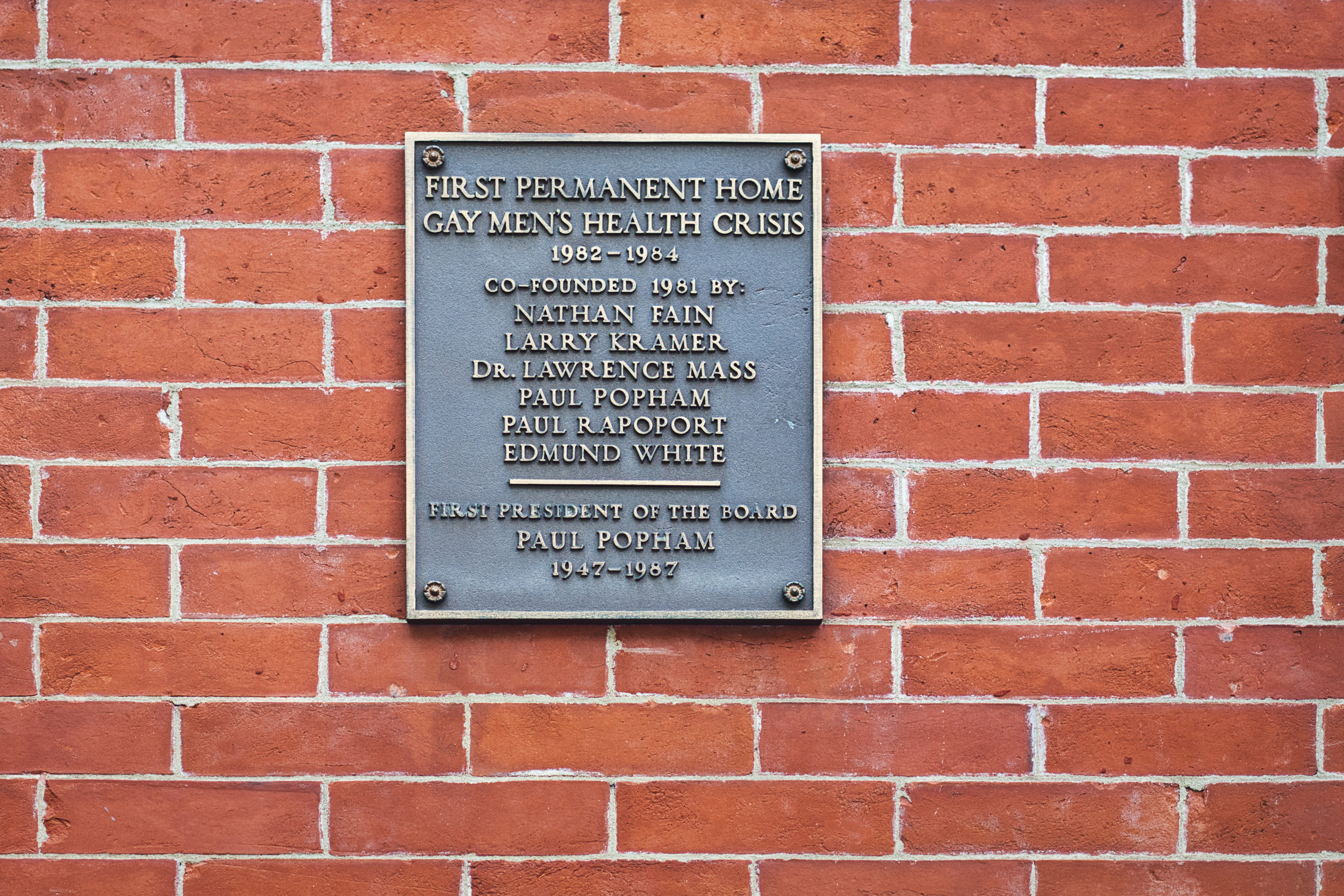
Plaque on the exterior of 318 West 22nd Street

Rodger McFarlane began a crisis counseling hotline that originated on his own home telephone, which ultimately became one of the organization's most effective tools for sharing information about AIDS. He was named director of GMHC in 1982, helping create a more formal structure for the nascent organization, which had no funding or offices when he took on the role. GMHC operated out of a couple of rooms for offices in a rooming house at 318 West 22nd Street in Chelsea owned by Mel Cheren of West End Records.

Popham's dedication to combating the AIDS crisis and his collaboration with stakeholders worldwide emphasized his commitment to public health. After being contacted by Gordon Price, a co-founder of AIDS Vancouver, Popham traveled to Vancouver to start a partnership that culminated in the inception of the inaugural AIDS Information Forum on March 12, 1983. Notably, Popham's knowledge shared during this forum was immortalized on film, signifying a stride in the nascent endeavors to tackle the epidemic.

Larry Kramer wrote that by the time of McFarlane's death, "the GMHC is essentially what he started: crisis counseling, legal aid, volunteers, the buddy system, social workers" as part of an organization that serves more than 15,000 people affected by HIV and AIDS. In an interview with The New York Times after McFarlane's death in May 2009, Kramer described how "single-handedly Rodger took this struggling ragtag group of really frightened and mostly young men, found us an office and set up all the programs."

Kramer resigned in 1983 due to his many disagreements with the other founders. From that time on, his public comments and posture toward GMHC were negative, if not hostile. Kramer's play The Normal Heart is a roman à clef of his involvement with the organization.

On April 30, 1983, the GMHC sponsored the first major fund-raising event for AIDS – a benefit performance of the Ringling Bros. and Barnum & Bailey Circus.

By 1984, the Centers for Disease Control and Prevention had requested GMHC's assistance in planning public conferences on AIDS. That same year, the human immunodeficiency virus was discovered by the French doctors Françoise Barré-Sinoussi and Luc Montagnier. Within two years, GMHC was assisting heterosexual men and women (see Dennis Levy), hemophiliacs, intravenous drug users, and children.

From 1987 until his death from AIDS in 1989, Doctor Barry Gingell served as a medical director for the Gay Men's Health Crisis.

Gay Men's Health Crisis received extensive coverage in Randy Shilts's 1987 book And the Band Played On. The book described the progress of the pandemic, praising GMHC for its work and blaming the government, especially the Reagan administration and Secretary of Health Margaret Heckler, for failing to respond. Shilts was a gay man who later died of AIDS.

=== 1990s ===
GMHC, along with several other organizations, boycotted the 1990 International AIDS Conference in San Francisco in protest of the federal travel ban on people with HIV entering the United States. Though representatives from GMHC did not attend the official event, they did participate in a smaller conference, for people who had boycotted, which took place simultaneously in San Francisco.

The Fox Broadcasting Company donated the proceeds from the airing of the 1992 Freddie Mercury Tribute Concert in London's Wembley Stadium to GMHC.

GMHC debuted an HIV prevention subway campaign featuring gay and straight couples in 1994. GMHC admitted that the posters were "more explicit" than what they had produced in the past and featured animated condoms, lubricant and messages aimed towards sexually active youth, with the slogan "Young! Hot! Safe!" Staff at GMHC later said that the organization received bomb threats specifically citing the campaign.

GMHC employee James A. Fielding sued the organization alleging discrimination in 1994. Fielding sought $1.7 million in compensatory and punitive damages, claiming that he was not given a fair chance to apply for a role within GMHC, as leadership was afraid that, due to his HIV-positive status, he would have to call in sick.

A 1995 New York Times report detailing the FBI keeping a record of activist group ACT UP also claimed that the FBI kept a small file dedicated to GMHC.

Broadway star Bernadette Peters made her Carnegie Hall debut with a fundraiser for the organization.

GMHC began offering HIV testing and prevention counseling at its offices in 1997, at the David Geffen Center for HIV Prevention and Health Education after a $2.5 million gift from the David Geffen Foundation.

In 1997 the organization moved into headquarters at the nine-story Tisch Building at 119 West 24 Street in the Chelsea neighborhood. The building underwent a $12.5 million renovation. It is named for Preston Robert Tisch and Joan Tisch. The couple donated $3.5 million for the project and Joan is on the GMHC board of directors.

Weill-Cornell Medical Center opened the Chelsea Center for Special Studies, in GMHC's building in 1997, in what was then described as the "first large-scale collaboration between a major New York City hospital and an AIDS social service agency." The center offered medical services to people with HIV, many of them referred from GMHC.

Donna Summer headlined a fundraiser at Carnegie Hall that raised $400,000 for GMHC in 1998.

GMHC supported SB4422-B, a New York state bill to track new HIV infections in New York state, breaking from a consensus against such reporting among AIDS groups in the state. In its initial statement, GMHC supported following the "same practice used for infectious diseases like syphilis and tuberculosis." In its statement, the organization did not initially say that it discouraged New York state from collecting names, though in a later clarification, it said that it supported a code-based system rather than using the names of people living with HIV.

In the 1990s a fundraising event on the Atlantic Ocean beach at Fire Island Pines, New York evolved into a major circuit party and developed a reputation for being connected with unsafe sex and recreational drug use. Activist Spencer Cox wrote a letter to the New York Times defending the party, which he called a "drug-free event." He continued, "Perhaps if he had attended the party, he might have a better sense of how this annual celebration contributes to the fight against AIDS ... As a person with AIDS, I am comforted to know that the money raised will be used to finance needed services, and hope that G.M.H.C. will not sacrifice those programs by discontinuing the Morning Party." GMHC pulled the plug after the 1998 fundraiser after one man died on Fire Island of an overdose of the drug gamma hydroxy butyrate (GHB) the evening before the party and 21 revelers were arrested for drug possession.

=== 2000s ===
In the year 2000, Ana Oliveira, a lesbian and an acupuncturist, became the first woman to become the organization's executive director. She had been an employee there since 1996 and founded the organization's women's program. The decision to appoint Oliveira to the position was unanimous.

In April 2000, GMHC released Men Like Us: The GMHC Complete Guide to Gay Men's Sexual, Physical and Emotional Well-Being, written by the organization's former communications director, Daniel Wolfe. The book included basic information about sex, sexual pleasure, as well as nutrition, exercise, communication with partners, and more. The book was one of 61 nonfiction books nominated for a Stonewall Book Award from the American Library Association. The award eventually went to Gaylaw: Challenging the Apartheid of the Closet.

The Museum of the City of New York debuted an exhibit, "Gay Men's Health Crisis: 20 Years Fighting for People with HIV/AIDS", a collaboration between the museum and GMHC in April 2001. Curators of the exhibit, Jane Rossett and Jean Carlomusto alleged that the institution eliminated explicit sexual content, including depictions of sexual intimacy between gay men, from the exhibit, altering the meaning of the exhibit and the materials presented within. The materials included items documenting public health information campaigns about AIDS. Lawrence D. Mass, one of GMHC's founders, told the New York Times that the decision was "disturbing" and said the museum was practicing "real censorship and distortion of history." In an opinion published in the New York Times, the museum's director Robert Macdonald said the museum and GMHC "decided that sexually explicit images would not be included in the exhibition" in order to present the story to the "widest possible audience." He added, "To characterize that decision as censorship demonstrates a misguided view of the purpose of the exhibition and the professional responsibilities of museums."

To commemorate the 20th anniversary of AIDS in America, the AIDS Quilt hung in the GMHC lobby during World AIDS Day in 2001.

In the early 2000s, GMHC began a support group for people, especially gay men, who use crystal meth. In 2004, GMHC reported that 80% of new clients in its drug program reported using crystal meth, though it had been fewer than half in 2001. As part of an effort to raise awareness about a documented rise in crystal meth use, GMHC also began a poster campaign warning about the links between crystal meth and unsafe sex practices. The posters ran on gay cruising sites such as Manhunt. GMHC and other community groups also pushed back against efforts from federal prosecutors to distribute posters with the names and faces of known crystal meth dealers in gay neighborhoods, including Chelsea. In a January 2004 letter to the editor, Ana Oliveira expressed a desire to use a harm-reduction approach to crystal meth use.

Oliveira announced that she would leave GMHC, and her post as executive director, in December 2005. Dr. Marjoire Hill was named as the interim executive director in February 2006.

Due to decreased funding, GMHC ended its "buddy program" in 2005.

Prior to the 2008 presidential election, GMHC released a report outlining the stances of John McCain, Sarah Palin, Barack Obama, and Joe Biden on issues related to HIV/AIDS. After Barack Obama's election, GMHC released a policy brief detailing a set of federal priorities related to HIV, including the development of a national HIV/AIDS strategy, the repeal of the HIV travel ban, as well as a repeal of the federal ban on syringe exchange.

GMHC has received multiple grants from the Carnegie Corporation, an organization that has supported more than 550 New York City arts and social service institutions since its inception in 2002, and which was made possible through a donation by New York City mayor Michael Bloomberg (along with 406 other arts and social service institutions).

=== 2010s ===
Gay Men's Health Crisis (GMHC) moved to a new and expanded home consisting of 110,000 square feet (10,000 m^{2}) of redesigned and renovated space at 446 West 33rd Street in Manhattan. At the time of the announcement, co-founder Larry Kramer expressed disappointment with the move.

GMHC expanded its wide range of services for over 100,000 New Yorkers affected by HIV/AIDS. These services include health and nutrition education, legal, housing and mental health support, vocational training and case management. With a new state-of-the-art kitchen and larger dining room, free hot meals will be served to more clients. The Keith Haring Food Pantry Program will increase its capacity to provide grocery bags and nutrition counseling to more people in need.

During GMHC's move into their new building they were met with discrimination from prospective landlords. Many did not understand what GMHC was and how they offered services to the community and those sick with HIV/AIDS. Even when GMHC found a place to live there were several restrictions placed upon by the landlord. A major one was that GMHC couldn't perform any sort of medical procedures on the premises. This forced the GMHC clinic to not move along with the rest of GMHC.

The new location enabled GMHC to expand its services for people affected by HIV/AIDS. In the 39th year of the epidemic, HIV rates continue to increase locally and nationally, particularly among women, African Americans, Latinos, and men who have sex with men.

In 2010, GMHC expanded its "I Love My Boo" anti-stigma campaign into New York City subways. The ads featured Black and Latino same-sex couples embracing, holding hands and kissing and promoted HIV testing among gay men of color. The campaign, which had previously run in gay bars, received positive praise from journalist Kai Wright, who called it one of the "smartest, most compelling public health campaigns."

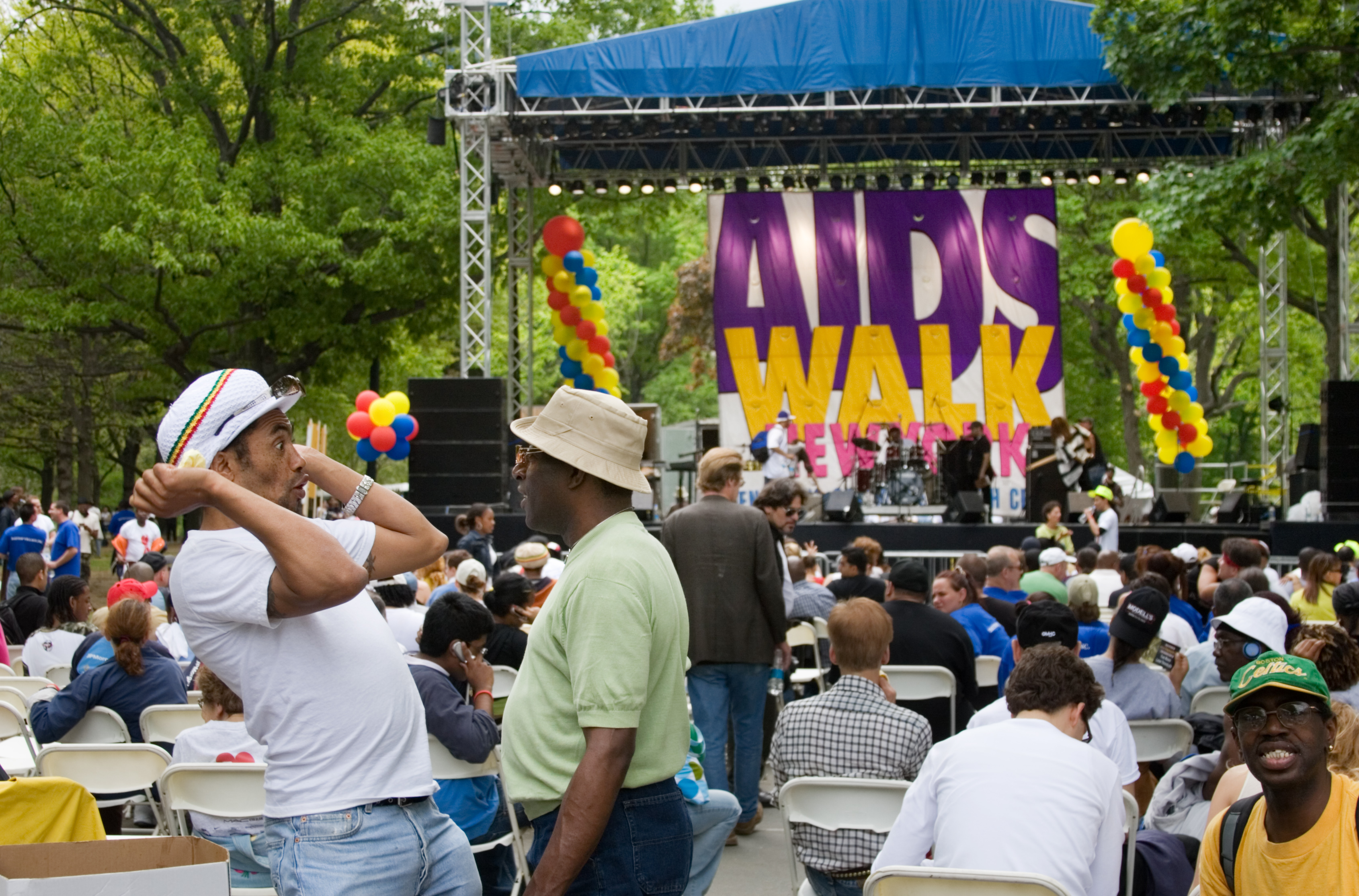
AIDS Walk 2005

In May 2010, GMHC celebrated the 25th anniversary of its annual fundraiser, AIDS Walk New York. GMHC had hoped to raise $5.3 million for the occasion and ended up raising $5.7 million.

GMHC joined an open letter from several nonprofit organizations urging the FDA to approve Truvada for use as pre-exposure prophylaxis in 2011.

GMHC partnered with GLAAD to denounce the New York City Department of Health and Mental Hygiene's ad campaign "Never Just HIV", which used graphic images to warn people that an HIV diagnosis could lead to other comorbidities. Francisco Roque, then the director of community health, said the ad campaign "paints this picture of gay men as these sort of disease-ridden vessels." GLAAD President Jarrett Barrios called the ad "sensationalized" and added that it "misses the mark in fairly and accurately representing what it's like to live with HIV/AIDS."

The New York Public Library put together an exhibition, "Celebrating 100 Years", in 2011 that was put together to "show the depth and breadth" of the library's collection. The exhibition included condoms distributed by GMHC in the 1990s.

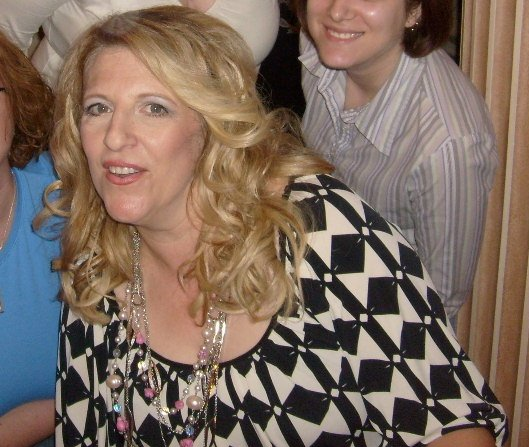
Lisa Lampanelli is an avid supporter of the LGBT community.

While appearing on the fifth season The Celebrity Apprentice, comedian Lisa Lampanelli raised $130,000 for GMHC.

In September 2013, GMHC announced that the organization and its CEO, Dr. Marjorie Hill, had "mutually decided" that they would part ways and that she would leave her role. Subsequent reporting about Hill's departure alleged that the organization's board of directors fired Hill, apparently because Hill "angered clients and staff." After news of her departure, a group of AIDS activists and professionals in the AIDS community wrote an open letter in support of Hill, noting that her service to GMHC is "unprecedented" and that she was at the time the longest-serving CEO with a tenure of seven years.

In the weeks following Hill's resignation, GMHC faced scrutiny for what some activists deemed as a lack of leadership in facing the AIDS crisis in New York City. ACT UP member Peter Staley wrote in HuffPost, " I can't tell you how many gay men I know who feel that GMHC is no longer on the community's radar", while a feature in the New York Times also spoke to several leaders who questioned the organization's direction.

GMHC joined a coalition of national LGBTQ+-serving organizations and issued an open letter seeking justice for Trayvon Martin in July 2013.

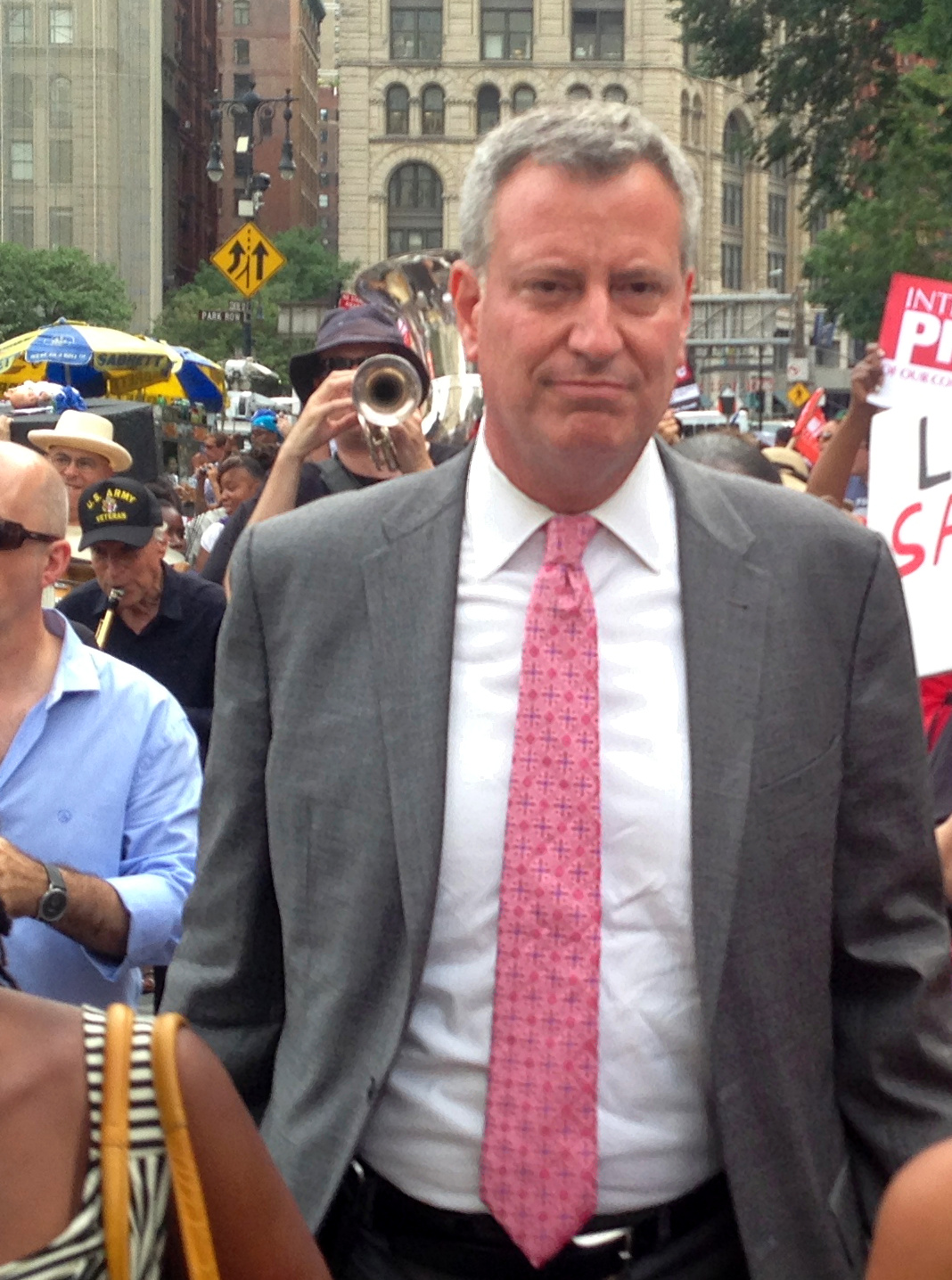
NYC Mayor-elect Bill de Blasio 2013 on the streets of New York City.

During the 2013 New York City mayoral election, GMHC held a forum for candidates to speak about issues related to HIV/AIDS in the city. Both Bill DeBlasio and Anthony Weiner attended the forum, which took place only three days after the Anthony Weiner sexting scandal made breaking news. Participants included New York City comptroller John C. Liu, former comptroller William C. Thompson Jr., speaker for the New York City Council Christine Quinn, New York City Council member Sal F. Albanese and former Bronx Borough President Adolfo Carrión Jr.

A 2013 DNAInfo report alleged that donations made to the annual AIDS Walk New York fundraiser were spent on administrative costs, including rent, rather than direct services. GMHC issued a statement calling the report "grossly inaccurate" and later released a statement which said that "in a time of leadership transition we are vulnerable to the attacks of "anonymous sources." GMHC said that due to stigma from landlords, it had few options for relocating in 2011, meaning a "near doubling in rent."

GMHC joined a coalition of AIDS organizations in signing an open letter to the Centers for Disease Control and Prevention urging that it stop using stigmatizing language, including "unprotected anal sex" in its materials. The letter stated that "unprotected" most often meant anal sex without a condom, but that the meaning of "unprotected" had changed alongside the approval of Truvada as pre-exposure prophylaxis.

The organization announced Kelsey Louie as the new CEO in April 2014.

After the approval of Truvada as pre-exposure prophylaxis in 2012, some AIDS service organizations spoke out against the drug, including Michael Weinstein of AIDS Healthcare Foundation, who called the pill a "party drug." However, GMHC embraced Truvada and in October 2014 released a statement saying that GMHC would advocate for the "widespread adoption" of PrEP. In 2016, GMHC launched an ad campaign to spread awareness around PrEP. The ads ran at 10 bus shelters in Brooklyn, Queens, the Bronx and uptown Manhattan.

GMHC helped to produce the return of the drag festival Wigstock in 2018.

The HIV prevention and testing programs expanded in the new GMHC Center for HIV Prevention at 224 West 29th Street in NYC which will include a new youth leadership-development program. In 2019, GMHC's Testing Center moved to 307 West 38th Street where the offices are located as of 2018. In order to keep up with the COVID-19 global pandemic GMHC has begun offering HIV testing at home to make sure people are sticking to social distance guidelines. They have also closed their usual testing site and created an offsite location for continuing testing. The test results can take anywhere from 2–20 minutes for people to get an answer. While GMHC cannot give out HIV medications such as PrEP or PEP they can help people find options at a lower cost once they have a prescription.

In 2015 Larry Kramer was reunited with GMHC almost thirty years after he was removed from the organization. Even after years of criticism from Kramer about many of the choices made by GMHC, Kelsey Louie, a member of GMHC reached out to Kramer. After several meetings between Kelsey and Kramer a peace offering seemed to have been reached. Kramer was invited to GMHC's gala as a special guest and presented with their first ever lifetime achievement award. Kramer held no ill will towards the organization and was happy to be invited back. Since his first appearance, Kramer continued to attend GMHC events and had even been invited to speak at GMHC staff meetings before his death in May 2020.

=== 2020s ===
To commemorate the 40th anniversary of AIDS in the United States, GMHC launched a video series featuring prominent members of the HIV/AIDS community, including GMHC co-founder Larry Mass, activist Mark S. King, and former speakers of the New York City council Corey Johnson. Those featured in the videos were invited to "share their thoughts on what will it take to end the epidemic in our lifetimes."

GMHC helped stage a response to the 2022–2023 mpox outbreak in New York City. The organization created a dedication section of the website with information about the virus and handed out information about the virus at their annual Latex Ball fundraiser.

== In the media ==
- The early work of GMHC is featured in the second episode of the fifth season of the podcast Fiasco, hosted by Leon Neyfakh.
- Larry Kramer's 1985 play The Normal Heart details Kramer's involvement in the founding of GMHC. In a letter distributed to theatergoers at the play's 2011 Broadway revival, Kramer said that the character "Bruce" was based on Paul Popham, a founder of GMHC and its president from 1981 until 1985. The play was adapted into an HBO film of the same name in 2014.
- In the 1989 drama Longtime Companion, the first widely release film to deal with AIDS, a character calls Gay Men's Health Crisis.
- While appearing on the fifth season The Celebrity Apprentice, comedian Lisa Lampanelli raised $130,000 for GMHC.
- Several members of GMHC staff were featured in the documentary Sex Positive about activist and author Richard Berkowitz, including Francisco Roque and co-founder Edmund White.
