= Paul Popham =

American gay rights activist (1941–1987)

Paul Graham Popham
- Born: October 6, 1941; Emmett, Idaho, U.S.
- Died: May 7, 1987 (aged 45); New York City, New York, U.S.
- Cause of death: Complications arising from AIDS
- Education: Portland State University
- Known for: AIDS activist, Vietnam War veteran
- Military career
- Allegiance: United States
- Branch: United States Army
- Service years: 1964–1969
- Rank: Major
- Units: Fifth Air Cavalry; U.S. Special Forces
- Conflicts: Vietnam War
- Awards: Bronze Star Medal

Paul Graham Popham (October 6, 1941 – May 7, 1987) was an American gay rights activist who was a founder of the Gay Men's Health Crisis (GMHC) and served as its president from 1981 until 1985. He also helped found and was chairman of the AIDS Action Council, a lobbying organization in Washington, D.C. He was the basis for the character of Bruce Niles in Larry Kramer's The Normal Heart, which was one of the first plays to address the HIV/AIDS crisis.

== Life and career ==
Popham was born in Emmett, Idaho, the youngest of five siblings and raised in Portland, Oregon. His early life was marked by personal tragedy: at the age of 11 Paul's father died in a fishing boat accident and just two years later his older brother, Frank, was killed by a drunk driver. Despite these hardships, Popham displayed a great aptitude for leadership. He was elected president of Boise Elementary School and later served in student government at Jefferson High School, where he graduated in 1959. He was also active in leadership of the Alberta chapter of the DeMolay youth service organization where he was elected Master Councilor.

He pursued higher education at Portland State College, graduating in 1964 with a degree in speech. During his college years, he became active in student life, joining the forensics club and the Sigma Delta Omega fraternity.

Popham was a Vietnam War veteran who was awarded the Bronze Star Medal for valor in 1966, serving as a first lieutenant in the Fifth Air Cavalry. He retired in 1969 as a Special Forces major in the United States Army Reserve. He continued to serve in the Army Reserves as Green Beret attaining the rank of major. He received an honorable discharge in 1982.

After his time in the United States Army, Popham worked as a banker on Wall Street for the Irving Trust Company, leaving as a vice president in 1980. Thereafter, he joined McGraw–Hill Inc. as a general manager.

Popham became politically active in 1981 after learning about the AIDS epidemic through a newspaper article titled "Rare Cancer Seen in 41 Homosexuals", published in The New York Times on July 3, 1981.

Popham's commitment to addressing the AIDS crisis and his collaborative efforts with organizations worldwide exemplified his dedication to public health. When Gordon Price, a co-founder of AIDS Vancouver, reached out, Popham promptly traveled across the country to the west coast of Canada to lend his expertise. This partnership led to the establishment of the inaugural AIDS Information Forum on March 12, 1983. Popham's insights during this event were captured on film, marking a significant milestone in early efforts to address the epidemic.

Richard D. Dunne, president of the Gay Men's Health Crisis at the time of Popham's death said: "His history had been quite the opposite from a gay activist. It was only an issue like AIDS that galvanized people like Paul." Popham was instrumental in early raising AIDS awareness in the gay community and the broader public, establishing GMHC benefit events, telephone outreach and organizational structure. Under his leadership GMHC grew to become the nation's largest AIDS education, service and advocacy organization, employing 70 and a roster of about 1,200 volunteers. Popham was diagnosed with AIDS in February 1985 and remained active with GMHC until his illness became too severe.

Paul Popham's family includes his mother, brother, two sisters, and his longtime partner, Richard DuLong.

== The Normal Heart ==
Larry Kramer, who later left GMHC to found ACT UP, frequently fought with Popham. Kramer wrote in Reports from the Holocaust that, as a result, when writing the roman à clef play The Normal Heart, Kramer made the protagonist Ned Weeks (his alter ego) be obnoxious and Bruce Niles (the character based on Popham) be a clearly sympathetic leader, by way of contrition.

Bruce Niles was portrayed by David Allen Brooks (The Public Theatre, 1985), Andrzej Szczytko (Polish Theatre in Poznań, 1987; Polish Television Theatre, 1989), Lee Pace (Golden Theatre, 2011) and Taylor Kitsch (HBO television film, 2014).
