= Alan Herbert (Canadian politician) =

Canadian politician (1944–2023)

Vancouver City Councillor
- In office November 16, 1996 – November 20, 1999

Personal details
- Born: Lawrence Herbert; August 14, 1944 Vancouver, British Columbia
- Died: April 11, 2023 (aged 78)
- Party: Non-Partisan Association (NPA)
- Other political affiliations: Vancouver Civic Action Team (vcaTEAM) (2002)
- Spouse: Carol Herbert (née Chertkow) (m. 1968; div. 1983)
- Education: Master of Geography
- Alma mater: University of British Columbia
- Profession: Urban planner
- Known for: HIV/AIDS advocacy LGBT activist
- Awards: Queen Elizabeth II Golden Jubilee Medal

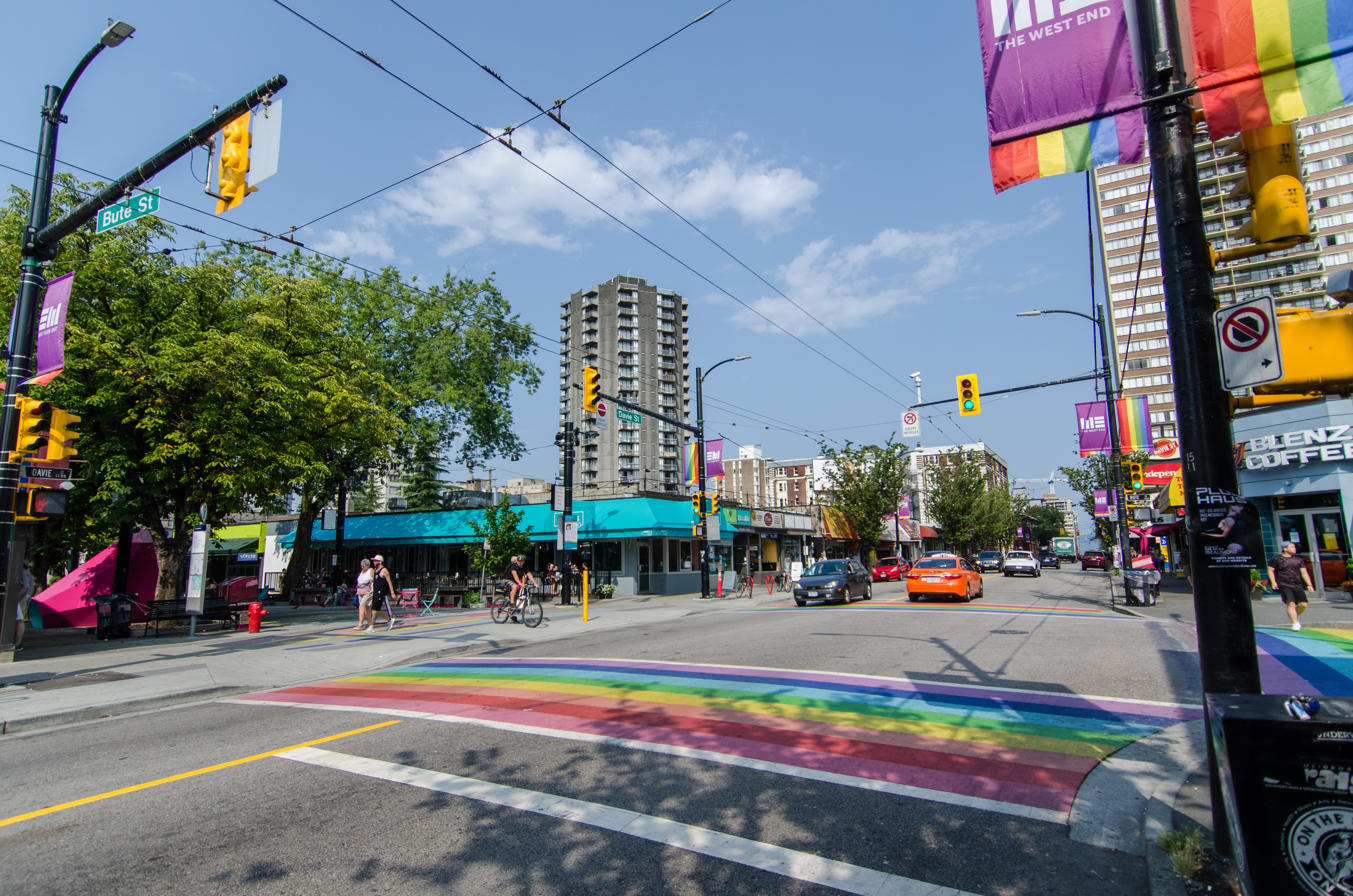
Davie Village: Davie Street & Bute Street, 2018

Alan Herbert (August 14, 1944 – April 11, 2023) was a Canadian politician and activist. He served as a member of the Vancouver City Council from 1996 to 1999, representing the Non-Partisan Association. Herbert was among the first openly gay politicians in Canada, advocating for LGBTQ+ rights and representation. Despite encountering challenges and conflicts within the political arena, he remained dedicated to his principles and causes.

== Activism and advocacy ==
Alan Herbert was a prominent AIDS activist and politician known for advocating for queer causes for over three decades. He played a significant role in securing government funding for AIDS Vancouver, which became the first AIDS-based organization to receive funding in Canada, with both municipal and federal support. Herbert founded McLaren House, Canada's first housing facility for people living with HIV/AIDS, and was instrumental in developing the country's first pamphlet on safer sex. Additionally, Herbert participated in the campaign to save St. Paul's Hospital from closure in 2005. He also supported transgender activist Jamie Lee Hamilton's 2008 campaign for election to the Vancouver Park Board. His efforts led to significant achievements in HIV/AIDS awareness, support services, and community development.

== Collaborations and relationships ==
Herbert collaborated closely with fellow activist Gordon Price, who helped establish AIDS Vancouver and served on the Vancouver City Council. Price praised Herbert's passion for politics and advocacy, although his tenure as a city councillor was brief due to conflicts within the Non-Partisan Association.

== Community impact ==
Herbert's contributions significantly impacted Vancouver's LGBTQ+ community, leading to advancements in HIV/AIDS awareness, support services, and community development. He played a key role in developing Davie Village into a vibrant LGBTQ+ neighbourhood and fought for the expansion of queer-friendly spaces.

== Legacy ==
Herbert's activism extended across various areas beyond politics. He founded several groups, including Gay and Grey and McLaren House, and served as chair of the Vancouver Pride Society. As a board member at AIDS Vancouver, he played a pivotal role in advancing HIV/AIDS advocacy. Additionally, he contributed to the Vancouver City Planning Commission as a member. Alan Herbert's successful campaign to secure a liquor license for the Fountainhead Pub marked a significant achievement in Vancouver's LGBTQ+ community development. Despite this accomplishment, Herbert's tenure with the NPA was brief, and he later ran unsuccessfully as an independent candidate. Despite these setbacks, Herbert continued to advocate for LGBTQ+ rights and community development.

His impact on Vancouver's LGBTQ+ community was profound, characterized by his leadership in advancing HIV/AIDS advocacy, establishing crucial support services, and fostering inclusive spaces, leaving a lasting legacy of progress and community development.

Herbert received recognition for his 30 years of contributions, including the Queen Elizabeth II Golden Jubilee Medal in 2002 and Xtra West's Lifetime Achievement Award in 2004. Additionally, he was honoured with AIDS Vancouver's Red Ribbon Award in 2015 on World AIDS Day.

== Personal life ==
Alan Herbert was born on August 14, 1944, in Vancouver, British Columbia. Originally named Lawrence Herbert, he changed his first name to Alan after publicly coming out as gay in the early 1980s, demonstrating personal courage amidst societal prejudice against LGBTQ+ individuals. His decision reflected a commitment to honesty and authenticity, contributing to greater visibility and acceptance of LGBTQ+ individuals in Canadian society.

Initially pursuing a career in urban planning, Herbert later transitioned into activism and politics. In December 1968, Alan Herbert married Carol Herbert (née Chertkow). The couple had three children: Jason, Alisa and Keren. However, they separated around the time of his coming out and HIV diagnosis. Despite their divorce, Alan maintained a cordial relationship with his former wife. His personal journey, marked by his acknowledgment of his sexual orientation and the subsequent HIV diagnosis, influenced both his advocacy work and personal relationships.

He died on April 11, 2023, at the age of 78, after battling Parkinson's disease, dementia, and HIV/AIDS simultaneously.
