= 1996 Vancouver municipal election =

- November 16, 1996

11 seats in Vancouver City Council
- Turnout: 32.1% ▼3.9 pp
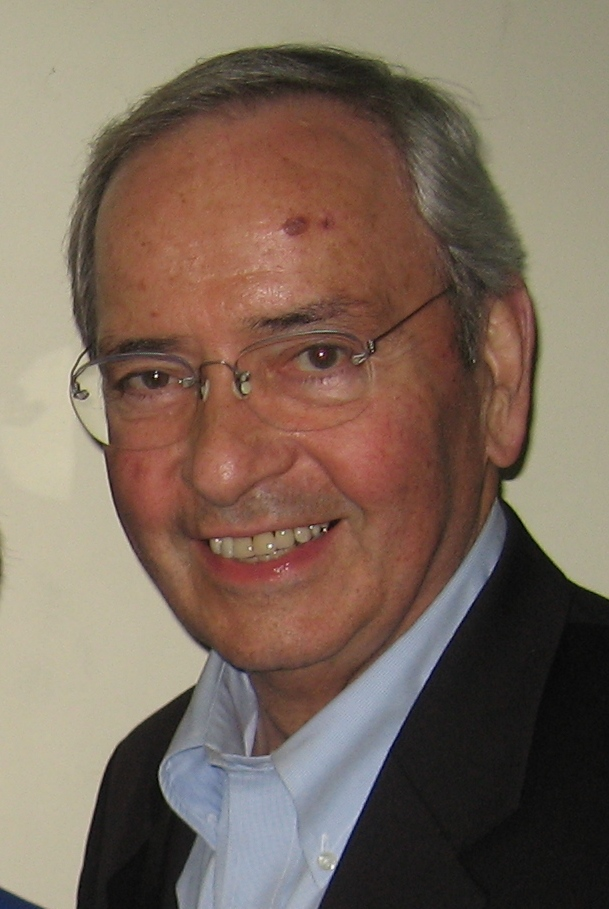
	First party	Second party	Third party
		COPE	VOICE
Leader	Philip Owen	Carmela Allevato	Jonathan Baker
Party	NPA	COPE	VOICE
Seats won	11	0	0
Seat change	▲1	▼1
Popular vote	50,969	26,143	10,703
Percentage	53.15%	27.26%	11.16%
- Mayoral results by voting division
Mayor before election
Philip Owen
NPA
Elected mayor
Philip Owen
NPA

The city of Vancouver, Canada, held municipal elections on November 16, 1996. Canadian citizens who were over 18 years of age at the time of the vote, and had been a resident of Vancouver for the previous 30 days and a resident of British Columbia for the previous six months, were able to vote for candidates in four races that were presented on one ballot. In addition, Canadian citizen non-resident property owners were eligible to vote.

The ballot elected one mayor, ten councillors, nine School Board trustees and seven Park Board commissioners. Each elector could vote for as many candidates as there were open seats (e.g., an elector could vote for ten or fewer councillors).

There was no fee associated with registering as a candidate at this time. Brian "Godzilla" Salmi, a freelance journalist for publications such as Terminal City, The Stranger, The National Post and The Georgia Straight, publicly offered to buy a pitcher of beer for anyone who ran for office, resulting in numerous joke-candidates appearing on the ballot that year.

As well, Vancouver voters voted on several referendum questions. A majority of voters voted against electoral system reform and in favour of retaining the at-large districting.

== Elections to Vancouver City Council ==
=== Overall council results ===
All figures include votes cast for both mayor and councillors

Party	Party leader or mayoral candidate	# of candidates	Council seats				Total popular vote		
Party	Party leader or mayoral candidate	# of candidates	1993	Before election	Elected	Change	#	%	Change
NPA	Philip Owen	10			10				
COPE	Carmela Allevato	10			0				
Green	Paul Watson	2	-	-					
VOICE	Jonathan Baker	8	-	-	-				
Independent			-	-	-				
Total					10	-		100.0	-

=== Mayoralty election ===
One to be elected.

Candidate	Party	Votes	%
Philip Owen	NPA	50969	
Carmela Allevato	COPE	26143	
Jonathan Baker	VOICE	10703	
Paul Watson	Green	3117	
Marc Emery	Independent	1125	
Sage Advice	Independent	340	
Dhavide Arjunan Aruliah	Independent	311	
Gilbert Bailey	Independent	287	
Zippy the Circus Chimp	Independent	264	
Jay Mang	Independent	168	
Ronald F. McDonald	Independent	145	
Jennifer E. Dunnaway	Independent	136	
Yummy Girl	Independent	130	
Greg Westerlund	Independent	127	
A. Red Hot Pepper	Independent	106	
Randy Oliver O'Grady	Independent	103	
Barb E. Doll	Independent	101	
Sarah Whittam	Independent	99	
Kellee Lynn Cole	Independent	94	
Jason Benj	Independent	90	
Tony Montana	Independent	78	
Michael J. Foster	Independent	71	
Lupo The Butcher	Independent	69	
Mr. X	Independent	68	
Allison Jane Mclennan	Independent	59	
Samantha Foxx	Independent	57	
Lorna Marie Potter	Independent	57	
Eddie Fernandes	Independent	55	
Frank The Moose	Independent	50	
John M. Mcgoldrick	Independent	49	
Gölök Zlf Buday	Independent	42	
Buzz	Independent	42	
Michel Leblond	Independent	42	
Bugger	Independent	39	
Roger Stewart Reimer	Independent	38	
Ryan S. Bigge	Independent	38	
Christina Louise Sharlow	Independent	36	
Zaius	Independent	36	
Gaston Gingras	Independent	32	
Jurgen T. Schaub	Independent	28	
Pete Fishburger	Independent	28	
Kenneth P. Thomas	Independent	27	
Stuart Maxwell	Independent	26	
L. Ron Moonbeam	Independent	25	
Tho Buskerville	Independent	24	
Pete Chezankreme	Independent	24	
Nicholas Podbrey	Independent	24	
The Trash Terminator	Independent	24	
John A. Tweed	Independent	22	
Tamas R. Revoczi	Independent	19	
Dylan Rymer	Independent	18	
James Octeau	Independent	15	
Ingrid	Independent	15	
Steve Wansleeben	Independent	14	
Sebastian Templer	Independent	12	
Figgg Freud	Independent	11	
Jeff D. Nix	Independent	10	
The Stainer	Independent	10	

=== Councillors election ===
Ten to be elected.

Candidate	Party	Votes	%
Jennifer Clarke	NPA	46700	
Gordon Price	NPA	45118	
Don Bellamy	NPA	44051	
George Puil	NPA	43541	
Lynne Kennedy	NPA	43284	
Nancy Chiavario	NPA	42680	
Sam Sullivan	NPA	40846	
Daniel Lee	NPA	40405	
Don Lee	NPA	39319	
Alan Herbert	NPA	36174	
Tim Louis	COPE	28483	
Mel Lehan	COPE	26593	
Michael Walker	COPE	23666	
Jamie Lee Hamilton	COPE	23510	
Sean R. McEwen	COPE	23329	
Merrilee Robson	COPE	22833	
Shane Simpson	COPE	22761	
Frances Wasserlein	COPE	22202	
Blair Petrie	COPE	21961	
Nina Khajuria	COPE	21402	
Frederic Bass	Green	14476	
Connie Fogal	VOICE	14434	
Raymond Leung	VOICE	14370	
Valerie Jerome	Green	13863	
Stephen F.Y. Chong	Independent	9531	
Bev Ballantyne	VOICE	8887	
Brian Lee Buchanan	VOICE	7996	
Wendy M. Turner	Independent	7895	
Sarah J. Farris	VOICE	7794	
Harkirpal S. Sara	VOICE	6843	
Manuel A. Azevedo	VOICE	6308	
Jenny Shaw	Independent	5706	
Arno D. Neumann	VOICE	5033	
Gordon T. Kennedy	Independent	4071	
Mike Bell	Independent	3434	
Ann Livingston	LWF	3159	
Lorelei Hawkins	Independent	2924	
Maureen G. Dawson	Independent	2560	
Heather Inglis Baron	Independent	2547	
Julia Ann Marks	Independent	2425	
William W. Kay	LWF	2414	
Martha Roberts	LWF	2383	
Shane Delarue	LWF	2192	
Mike Lawrence	Independent	2192	
Iqbal Sara	Independent	2031	
Jeffery D. Berwick	Independent	2004	
Matt McGrath	LWF	1961	
Cowboy Ellis	Independent	1927	
Joan L. Rowntree	Independent	1900	
Howard Dahl	Independent	1881	
Mike Mclean	Independent	1684	
Sharai Mustatia	LWF	1681	
Guy Wera	Independent	1476	
Robert Martin McCallum	Independent	1465	
Anthony J. Ryder	LWF	1383	
Joseph X	LWF	1334	
Lani Russwurm	LWF	1292	
Gator McCluskie	Independent	827	
Total			100.0

== Elections to the Vancouver Park Board ==
Seven to be elected.

Candidate	Party	Votes	%
	Independent		
	Independent		
	Independent		
Total			100.0

== Referendum results ==
Vancouver voters voted on question of electoral system reform.

A majority of voters voted against electoral system reform and in favour of retaining the at-large districting. A little more than 59 percent voted in favour of "keeping the existing system of electing councillors 'at large', whereby all voters can vote for all councillors."

If reform had received more than 60 percent, then the results of the supplementary question "which method of electing councillors would you prefer?" would have been considered:

- the option "Ward system, whereby only the electors of the ward vote for only one member of Council" received approval from 56 percent of voters
- the option "Mixed system, which combines some councillors elected 'at large' and some ward councillors" received approval from 48 percent
- the option "Proportional System, whereby the make-up of Council is determined in part by the percent of the popular vote obtained by each political group during the election" received approval from 37 percent
- the option "Other system of electing councillors" received approval from 25 percent of valid votes cast
