= Barry Gingell =

American AIDS activist (1954–1989)

Barry Gingell (December 2, 1954 – May 29, 1989) was an American internist, nutritionist, computer scientist and AIDS activist. He served as a medical director for the Gay Men's Health Crisis and an advocate for experimental drugs during the AIDS epidemic in the 1980s.

== Life and career ==
A native of Johnson City, New York, Gingell received a Bachelor of Science degree from Syracuse University and a medical degree from New York University. He interned at the New York University School of Medicine before practicing medicine in the Bronx and the Lower East Side of Manhattan.

Gingell studied computer science at Columbia University and combined his medical training and computer interests to founded a computerized nutritional advisory program. He operated Optimal Nutrition Engineering for five years in Greenwich Village.

Gingell was diagnosed with AIDS in 1985. Shortly after, he traveled to Mexico to obtain two experimental drugs used to treat AIDS patients, isoprinosine and ribavirin, which were not available in the United States. Gingell was critical of several federal agencies such as the National Institutes of Health and the FDA because of their slow pace of introducing new drug therapies to combat HIV/AIDS and their restricted access.

In 1987, Gingell became medical information director of the non-profit organization Gay Men's Health Crisis, where he created a newsletter about AIDS therapy called Treatment Issues. He also served on the National Academy of Sciences, the Society of Infectious Diseases, the Community Research Initiative, and the AIDS Resource Center.

In 1988, Gingell testified before the House Subcommittee on Human Resources and the Presidential Commission on experimental drugs to treat AIDS.

Gingell died of AIDS at St. Vincent's Hospital in New York City on May 29, 1989. He was 34.
