= Paul Rapoport =

American lawyer

- Born: Paul Israel Rapoport; March 6, 1940; Flushing, New York, United States
- Died: July 9, 1987 (aged 47); New York, New York, United States
- Education: Cornell University, 1962; Columbia University Law School, 1965; New York University School of Law
- Occupation: Lawyer
- Known for: Lesbian, Gay, Bisexual & Transgender Community Center; Gay Men's Health Crisis

Paul Israel Rapoport (March 6, 1940 – July 9, 1987) was an American lawyer and co-founder of both the New York City Lesbian, Gay, Bisexual & Transgender Community Center and Gay Men's Health Crisis. The private foundation that bore his name was, during its active years, one of the oldest and largest LGBT-focused foundations in the country.

Rapoport was born in Flushing, New York in 1940, the son of Ida and David and younger brother of Daniel, and attended New York City P.S. 107, the Horace Mann School and Cornell University, from which he graduated in 1962. He graduated cum laude from Columbia University Law School in 1965, and later received an LL.M. in tax from New York University School of Law.

Rapoport died of AIDS at New York University Medical Center at the age of 47. In September 1987 his estate of roughly $8 million was used to establish The Paul Rapoport Foundation, which at Rapoport's direction gave to LGBT and HIV/AIDS causes in the New York metropolitan area.

In a press release dated July 6, 2009 the Paul Rapoport Foundation announced its intention to spend out. The Foundation ceased operations in June 2015. Its archives are located in the Human Sexuality Collection of the Cornell University Library.

== Sources ==
- Obituary, The Record (Bergen County), July 12, 1987
