= AIDS Walk New York =

Annual fundraiser in New York, United States

AIDS Walk New York is an annual fundraising walkathon, held in Central Park, that benefits Gay Men's Health Crisis and over 50 other local AIDS service organizations. Founded in 1986, it is now the largest walkathon in the world, and the largest AIDS fundraiser in the world by participation. In 2008 the event had 45,000 participants raising $7.4 million.

== History ==
In the initial 1986 AIDS Walk, over $700,000 was raised by 6,000 participants who completed the 10-kilometer (6.2-mile) course that began and ended at Lincoln Center, where Mayor Ed Koch and entertainer Peter Allen greeted the participants.

The following year, 1987, twice as many participants raised more than twice as much money ($1.6 million), an amount the event's co-producer Craig Miller, who hoped to reach the $1 million mark, called "incredible." Harvey Fierstein and Lynn Redgrave joined Mayor Koch at the starting line in Damrosch Park.

In 1988, walking from Lincoln Center up Riverside Drive and down Central Park West, approximately 16,000 participants raised nearly $2.5 million for GMHC's services to people with AIDS.

Prior to the 1989 AIDS Walk, New York City Ballet stars Heather Watts and Jack Soto used their pre-performance time at Lincoln Center's New York State Theater to solicit contributions for the event, whose opening ceremony was hosted by Harvey Fierstein and Tony Randall. That year, the event raised $3 million.

The 1990 AIDS Walk, which took in $3.8 million, was the second year that part of the proceeds from the event was distributed to groups other than GMHC; among the more than a dozen organizations receiving a total of $600,000 were the Women's AIDS Resource Network, God's Love We Deliver, and People of Color in Crisis.

The following year, in what was the then-largest, most successful AIDS fundraiser ever, AIDS Walk New York raised $4.15 million even as incoming GMHC board president Jeff Soref said that the number of AIDS patients was "growing so quickly that no community-based organization can keep pace" and urged the 26,000 walkers to petition for more government-based funding.

Throughout the mid-1990s, despite heavy rainfalls, a change in the march route to begin and end in Central Park, and an increasing number of local AIDS Walks in the city's suburbs and elsewhere, AIDS Walk New York continued to raise record funds (generally around $5 million) and attract more participants, including more high school students.

Performer and activist Michael Callen introduced his song "Love Don't Need a Reason" at the first AIDS Walk New York in 1986 and continued to sing the song before each AIDS Walk every year through 1993. At the 1994 AIDS Walk, following Callen's death, Holly Near and Marsha Melamet sang the song in his stead.

In 1997, following the introduction of protease inhibitors for AIDS treatment, Mark Robinson, executive director of GMHC, noted that it had become harder for the group to drum up support for AIDS Walk New York than it had been, saying, "Too many celebrities and journalists have declared the crisis over. But it's not over." Nevertheless, 35,000 walkers participated that year, and the next year, 1998, saw a record 38,000 AIDS Walkers help GMHC reach its $4 million funding goal.

By May 2000, AIDS Walk New York began to settle into a pattern of about 30,000 participants and $4 million raised. It had become one of thousands of AIDS Walks, albeit one in the New York City, which along with San Francisco, was where AIDS activism had begun two decades before. Within the city, other boroughs, neighborhoods, and communities began holding their own AIDS Walks, such as the AIDS Walk Caribbean in Brooklyn.

In 2002, as AIDS became a treatable illness, interest in all AIDS-related events began to wane, GMHC decided to use celebrities like John Leguizamo, Madonna, Whoopi Goldberg, Eric McCormack and Ice-T to promote the AIDS Walk on posters throughout New York City even though the celebrities would not actually be participating. The advertising worked, and more than 42,000 participants (and celebrities such as Patti LaBelle) came to Central Park for the 2002 AIDS Walk.

During the opening ceremony of the 2006 AIDS Walk New York, Marjorie J. Hill, the interim president of GMHC, noted that 25 years had passed since public health officials first recognized the then-unidentified epidemic among gay men. That year's event was emceed by Naomi Watts and Queer Eye stars Carson Kressley and Ted Allen and raised about $6.5 million.

To commemorate a "quarter-century of collective loss, struggles and triumphs in an ongoing commitment to end the AIDS epidemic," GMHC established the "Alliance 25" Principal Sponsorship of AIDS Walk New York 2007, consisting of groups and individuals making a $25,000 commitment for the event.

The 2009 AIDS Walk, described as "massive" in the New York Daily News, raised $5.6 million, an amount Craig Miller called impressive "in the midst of this historically difficult recession." The 2010 event raised even more funds and featured "a cascade of celebrities" and more than 45,000 participants. The opening ceremonies for the 30th annual AIDS Walk included an award by GMHC to New York Governor Andrew Cuomo for his plan to drastically reduce the number of AIDS cases.

On Sunday, July 19, 2020, due to the COVID-19 pandemic, that year's AIDS Walk New York took place as virtual event in partnership with AIDS Walk San Francisco billed as the largest, single-day AIDS fundraising effort in the world. AIDS Walk: Live at Home was livestreamed at several websites and also broadcast on KGO-TV. The event featured numerous celebrities, including Anne Hathaway, Bette Miller and Matt Bomer.
