= Khelsilem =

Canadian politician and First Nations leader

Khelsilem Tl'aḵwasiḵ̓an Sxwchálten (born July 19, 1989), also known as Dustin Rivers, is an Indigenous Canadian politician and First Nations leader in British Columbia. He (Note: Khelsilem uses he/him and they/them pronouns. This article uses he/him for consistency.) served his first term as councillor for the Squamish Nation Council in 2017. The youngest Councillor elected, he topped the polls with the most votes and was appointed as one of two Official Spokespersons for the Squamish Nation Council. He serves on numerous Council committees including Finance & Audit, Governance, Human Resources, and chair the Planning & Capital Projects Committee, and deputy chair for the Rights & Title Committee and Climate Action Task Force.

A frequent critic of LNG projects and the Trans Mountain Pipeline Expansion Project, Khelsilem was recognized by Vancouver Magazine as one of the top 50 powerful people at #21 in 2018, and again in 2019 at #18.

On February 25, 2020, Khelsilem was interviewed by Linda Steele on Global News Radio about the anger and confusion around recent protests and blockades in support of Wet'suwet'en Nation.

== Personal life and education ==
The son of Kevin Rivers and Deborah Baker, Khelsilem is Squamish on both sides of the family, and Kwakwaka’wakw on his mother's side. He was raised in the Squamish Nation communities of Ustlawn, also known as the Mission Indian Reserve No.6, and Xwmelch'stn, also known as Capilano Indian Reserve No.5, in North Vancouver, British Columbia. He lives in the City of Vancouver.

He attended Carson Graham Secondary School, but dropped out before graduation.

Before entering politics Khelsilem was a graphic designer and artist, with public art featured in Vancouver Mural Fest.

In 2014, Khelsilem presented about his work to reduce the decline of Squamish language at Interesting Vancouver. He is a fluent Squamish language speaker which he learned as an adult. In 2015, he founded the non-profit Kwi Awt Stelmexw, an arts & education organization with the mission to restore Squamish language and culture, and in 2016 developed a language immersion program with Simon Fraser University to teach the Squamish language to Squamish people. He continued to teach for two years in the program he built before leaving the program upon being elected to the Squamish Nation Council.

In July 2019, Khelsilem publicly came out as a member of the LGBTQ2+ community. Khelsilem is bisexual and queer and uses he/they pronouns.

== Political career ==
In the 2017 Squamish Nation Election, he coordinated a campaign called "the New Nine" to elect nine non-incumbent candidates to the Squamish Nation Council. Out of the nine candidates promoted, eight were eventually elected.

As a Councillor, he has been involved in various projects and initiatives like the developing a not-for-profit housing society, the Integrated North Shore Transportation Planning Project, and the purpose-built rental and condo development project with Westbank on the Squamish Nation's Senakw lands, also known as the Kitsilano Reserve next to Burrard Street Bridge. In a 2022 interview, Khelsilem and former Vancouver city councillor Gordon Price discussed the complexities between Indigenous sovereignty, urban development, and community engagement in projects like Sen̓áḵw. Khelsilem emphasized the importance of regaining control over resources to support the Squamish Nation community's interests, highlighting their track record of developing rental housing.
