= Philip Owen =

Canadian politician and drug reform advocate (1933-2021)

Philip Walter Owen CM
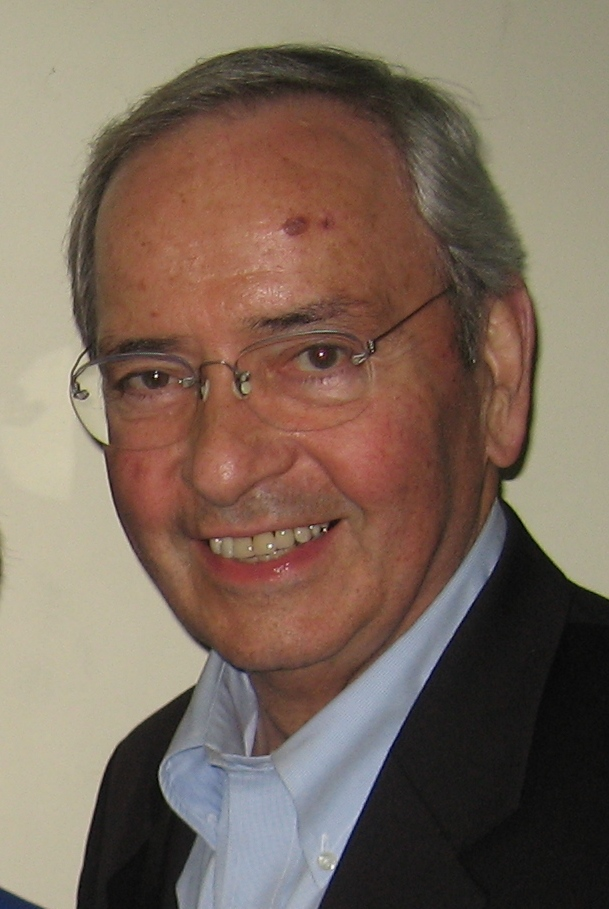

36th Mayor of Vancouver
- In office 1993–2002
- Preceded by: Gordon Campbell
- Succeeded by: Larry Campbell
- Constituency: Vancouver

Personal details
- Born: March 11, 1933 Vancouver, British Columbia, Canada
- Died: September 30, 2021 (aged 88) Vancouver, British Columbia, Canada
- Party: Non-Partisan Association
- Education: New York University
- Known for: Drug liberalization Supervised injection site Drug rehabilitation

Philip Walter Owen was a Canadian politician and drug reform advocate who served as the 36th mayor of Vancouver, British Columbia from 1993 to 2002.

== Political career ==
Owen served in various elected roles in Vancouver from 1978 to 2002. He entered civic politics in 1978 after being elected to the Vancouver Parks Board. In 1986 he became a member of Vancouver City Council, and served there for seven years.

Owen was elected as Mayor of Vancouver in November 1993, shortly after the city had hosted the first meeting between US President Bill Clinton and Russian president Boris Yeltsin on April 3–4, 1993, whom he met as part of the city's welcoming party. In his first term, the city opened Library Square, a new downtown complex for the Vancouver Public Library. Owen was re-elected in 1996 and 1999. Owen oversaw Vancouver's bid for the 2010 Olympic winter games, which it won in 2003; the redevelopment of the shuttered historic Woodward's department store; the public dispute over a drug "harm reduction" program; the downtown residential population doubling from 40,000 to 80,000; and numerous changes to housing policy. During Owen's term, Vancouver was rated the world's top city for quality of life by the William Mercer Study.

Owen did not seek re-election in 2002, after being told he would have to compete for the mayoral nomination of his own party, the Non-Partisan Association (NPA), a traditionally conservative civic party he had been part of for 25 years. This was following in-fighting among members of Owen's own party who said that Owen was 'supporting addicts' and was 'too weak on crime'. Following Owen's departure, the NPA lost the 2002 municipal election, returned to power in 2005, but has not won an election since then. In 2022, many former NPA members shifted their support to the relatively new ABC Vancouver party, which left the NPA with no seats on city council for the first time in over 80 years. Owen has spoken about how close and long-time friends stopped associating with him as well as his wife, Brita, following his public advocacy for harm reduction programs.

Former Vancouver mayor Mike Harcourt, a left-wing independent who served from 1980 to 1986, and who became 30th Premier of British Columbia, said of Owen's political career: “He grew dramatically, I think, particularly around the issue of addiction and poverty in the Downtown Eastside, He became a crusader, a very courageous crusader, and it [eventually] cost him getting the nomination for his own party, when he took up the Four Pillars approach on drug addiction. He really was fearless promoting it.”

== Drug reform ==
A public health emergency was declared in the Downtown Eastside in September 1997. Injection drug use had reached crisis levels with epidemics of HIV/AIDS and hepatitis C soon following.

Owen initially opposed drug reform. Further criminalization and the AIDS epidemic were seen as potential ends to the cities drug user problem. But following a change of heart while Mayor, Owen became noted for his championing of drug policy reform in his later years. According to Insite co-founder Liz Evans, “He started to watch people dying like flies from heroin overdoses, and at the time no-one was interested in having that conversation (about safely injecting drugs)." she continued, "He was a very decent man, a very kind man, and also a man who was not afraid to learn new things,”

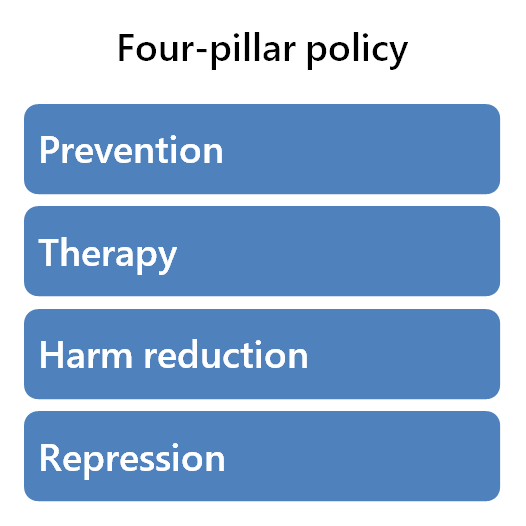
The four pillars of Switzerland's drug policy: prevention, treatment, harm reduction and repression.

Owen started the conversation on the "Four Pillars Approach", a novel strategy pioneered in Switzerland that represented a huge shift in public perception from treating substance use as a criminal justice issue towards a public health approach. The approach places an equal focus on harm reduction, prevention, treatment, and enforcement. After four years of research, Owen led a local and national debate to fight drug addiction problems in Canadian cities. An 85-page action plan was passed unanimously by Vancouver City Council in May 2001. This new policy had the support of over 80 per cent of Vancouver's residents, as well as the Federation of Canadian Municipalities' Big City Mayor's Caucus.

As a result, Vancouver opened Insite in 2003, the first legal safe injection site for intravenous drug users in North America. Owen used his position in the media to attempt to change the narrative on drug addiction away from crime and towards health policy, however, public opposition to Insite's opening was immediate and loud. Upon opening, it drew criticism from the Bush administration with John Walters, the director of the White House Office of National Drug Control Policy, calling it "state-sponsored suicide." The Harper Government called Insite "a failure of public policy and ethical judgement" In 2008, Minister of Health Tony Clement failed to renew Insite's exemption under the Controlled Drugs and Substances Act (CDSA) and publicly cast doubt on Insite's ability to operate any further.

The stark differences in defining addiction as either: a crime, or as a health condition needing treatment, lay at the heart of the public perception differences attempting to be changed within the Four Pillars approach. Under the Canadian Constitution, matters of criminal law are under both the jurisdiction of Federal and Provincial governments, but matters of Public Health are considered within the Exclusive Powers of Provincial Legislatures. This division of powers, and the conflicting definitions launched Canada (Attorney General) v PHS Community Services Society a Canadian Supreme court case that began in 2011, seeing Insite defend its right to existence in court against the powers of the Federal government intent on closing and barring further safe consumption sites from opening in Canada.

The case lasted 141 days before the supreme court, with 3 prior cases referenced, 5 Respondents including: Dean E. Wilson, Shelly Tomic, the PHS, and the BCAG. 15 Interveners including the: Canadian Nurses Association, British Columbia Nurses Union, QCAG, VCHA, CCLA, IHRA, RNAO, ARNoBC, CPHA, CMA, BCCLA, and REALWoC.

The courts ruling was a 9-0 unanimously dismissal of the Harper Government's appeal and cross-appeal stating: "The Minister of Health is ordered to grant an exemption to Insite under s. 56 of the CDSA forthwith" and following:

"The Minister’s decision thus engages the claimants’ s. 7 interests and constitutes a limit on their s. 7 rights. Based on the information available to the Minister, this limit is not in accordance with the principles of fundamental justice. It is arbitrary, undermining the very purposes of the CDSA, which include public health and safety. It is also grossly disproportionate: the potential denial of health services and the correlative increase in the risk of death and disease to injection drug users outweigh any benefit that might be derived from maintaining an absolute prohibition on possession of illegal drugs on Insite’s premises." [...] "The evidence indicates that a supervised injection site will decrease the risk of death and disease, and there is little or no evidence that it will have a negative impact on public safety, the Minister should generally grant an exemption."

In Insite's first 20 years of operation, facility's staff administered 11,856 overdose reversals, made 71,103 referrals to off-site services (such as rehab), and never saw one overdose death.

== Criticism ==
During Owen's mayoral tenure he was also the head of the Vancouver Police Board. During much of the Pickton investigation, after some 20 sex workers went missing from Vancouver's Downtown Eastside, Owen was criticized for commenting, that there was "no evidence that a serial killer is at work."

"No bodies have been found. They [the police] have a procedure for homicides and missing people, and they are following it. I don't think it is appropriate for a big award for a location service." Owen stated in 1999. Police said the number of disappearances in 1998 was unusually high, but public sentiment at the time was towards disparaging women in sex work as 'prostitutes' and 'vagrants' and public perception was that their disappearance and estrangement from their families was to be expected, or even original conditions for their line of work.

On February 15, 2011, Owen published letters in several major Canadian newspapers apologizing for comments that he made blaming former Vancouver Police Department Inspector Kim Rossmo for delays in the investigation of serial killer Robert Pickton, following a defamation case that was settled out of court.

== Awards ==
In the spring of 2008, Owen was admitted as a Member of the Order of Canada, the countries second highest honour of merit, in a ceremony at Rideu Hall. In 2014, Owen was awarded the Order of the Diocese of New Westminster during his lifelong membership to St. John's Shaughnessy.

Owen was honoured posthumously when the St. Paul's Foundation, with the support of Philip Owen's friends and colleagues, established the Philip Owen Professorship in Addiction Medicine at UBC.

== Personal life ==
Owen was born and raised in Vancouver. His father was Walter S. Owen, was Lieutenant Governor of British Columbia from 1973 to 1978. He completed his education at Prince of Wales Secondary School and later New York University. Owen started a textile business in his late 20's that later expanded to both Toronto and New York City. Owen managed the Eaton's store at Park Royal in the early 1960s, eventually resigning his position after refusing to fire an older employee for fear they would not receive their pension. In the 1970s he operated a boutique in the Hotel Vancouver lobby called Nonesuch. He became a director of the Vancouver Art Gallery, president of the Downtown Vancouver Association, chair of St. George's School. He served on the boards of Ovarian Cancer Canada, Opportunity International, the Salvation Army and Vancouver International Airport and was involved with many other local organizations. In later years, he and his wife Brita travelled to drug policy reform conferences in Canada, Europe, the United States and Afghanistan. Before his death, Owen received recognition for his work from many organizations including: B.C. Health Officers, Simon Fraser University, Lions International, Rotary International, the Brotherhood Inter-Faith Society, the B.C. Civil Liberties Association, the Richard J. Dennis Drug peace Award (New York) and the Canadian Criminal Justice Association. Owen died of complications related to Parkinson's disease on September 30, 2021, at the age of 88.
