= Francis John Blatherwick =

Canadian public health official

Francis John Blatherwick CM, OBC, CD, FRCP(C)
- Born: September 11, 1944 (age 82)
- Education: University of Alberta, medical doctorate, 1969 | University of Toronto, diploma in public health (1975)
- Occupation: Public Health Official
- Awards: Member of the Order of Canada, Order of British Columbia
- Website: https://www.blatherwick.net/

Dr. Francis John Blatherwick, CM, OBC, CD, FRCP(C) (born September 11, 1944) was one of Canada's trailblazing leaders in public health and was the longest-serving Medical officer of health in Canada when he retired in 2007.

== Education and early career ==
At the age of 16, he served in the Governor General's Foot Guards.

Blatherwick received his medical degree from the University of Alberta in 1969. While studying he served in the RCAF's 107 University Squadron, and 418 'City of Edmonton' Squadron.

He received his Diploma in Public Health at the University of Toronto in 1975 and completed his Fellowship in Public Health at University of British Columbia in 1976.

== Career ==
=== Public health ===
Blatherwick was the Medical Health Officer in the Simon Fraser Health Unit for nine years. He then started in public health when he left a residency in Internal Medicine at Vancouver General Hospital in 1971 to set up the Pine Street Youth Clinic.

Blatherwick was appointed as the Medical Health Officer or Chief Medical Health Officer in Vancouver, British Columbia in 1984. As the medical health officer for the Vancouver Coastal Health Authority, he was instrumental in implementing a number of important programs, particularly those involving youth, people with disabilities, individuals living with AIDS, combating drug addictions, and the initiative to ban smoking in the workplace. In September 1997, he declared a public health emergency in the Downtown Eastside are of Vancouver due to the escalating rate of HIV infections, largely attributed to the high rates of injection drug use. Insite, the first legal supervised safe injection site in North America, opened during his tenure. He led Vancouver's public health response to the 2003 SARS epidemic.

Blatherwick was adept at media relations and gained recognition for expressing independent, authoritative views on contentious health matters, including his activism during the AIDS pandemic. In the mid-1980s, Premier Bill Vander Zalm publicly threatened to dismiss him – twice – due to his advocacy for the inclusion of condoms and sex education in schools. He retired in 2007.

=== Armed forces ===
Blatherwick served in the Canadian Forces reserves for 39 years, retiring in 2000 with the rank of Commander and the position of Senior Naval Reserve Medical Advisor. He served in the Air Force, Army, and the Naval reserves, and was Canada's representative to the NATO Reserve Medical Officers’ Congress from 1989 to 1995.

He was the Honorary Colonel for 12 (Vancouver) Field Ambulance from 2006 to 2012.

== Personal life ==
Blatherwick has four children and ten grandchildren.

== Selected publications ==
- Vancouver's Needle Exchange Program, By John Bardsley, John Turvey and John Blatherwick, Canadian Journal of Public Health (1990), Vol. 81, pp. 39–45 ISSN 0008-4263

Blatherwick has written more than 20 books, mostly on medals and flying, including

- Royal Canadian Air Force Honours, Decorations, Medals, 1920–1968, (1991), FJB Air Publications.
- A History of Airlines in Canada, (1989), Unitrade Press, ISBN 0-919801-66-8
- Canadian Orders, Decorations, and Medals, (1983), Unitrade Press
- 1000 Brave Canadians: The Canadian Gallantry Awards, 1854–1989, (1991), Unitrade Press

== Honours and awards ==
=== Honorary degrees ===
- Honorary degree at the University of British Columbia, 2008
- Honorary degree as a Doctor of Science, Simon Fraser University, 2021

=== Awards ===
- Canadian Forces' Decoration with 3 Clasps (CD)
- 3 May 1995 - Member of the Order of Canada (CM).
- 1979 – Order of St. John of Jerusalem, Officer 1984, Commander 1989
- 2007 – Member of the Order of British Columbia (OBC), upon his retirement.
- Special Service Medal with "NATO-OTAN" Clasp
- 1967 - Canadian Centennial Medal
- 1977 - Queen Elizabeth II Silver Jubilee Medal (Canada)
- 1992 – 125th Anniversary of the Confederation of Canada Medal
- 2002 – Queen Elizabeth II Golden Jubilee Medal (Canada)
- 2012 – Queen Elizabeth II Diamond Jubilee Medal (Canada)
- Service Medal of the Order of St John with 1 Silver Bar
- 2002 – named Canadian Health Hero by the Pan American Health Organization
- 2005 – Silver Medal of Service from the British Columbia Medical Association
