= Carol Pearl Herbert =

OC FCAHS Carol Pearl Herbert
- Born: 1946 (age 79–80); Vancouver, British Columbia, Canada
- Spouse(s): Alan (Larry) Herbert (m. 1968, divorced) Fred Swartz (m. 1993)

Academic background
- Education: BSc, biochemistry, 1966, MD., 1969, University of British Columbia

Carol Pearl Herbert OC FCAHS (nee Chertkow; born 1946) is a Canadian family physician and researcher. She is a member of the National Academy of Medicine, Order of Canada, and Canadian Academy of Health Sciences.

== Early life and education ==
Herbert was born in 1946, in Vancouver, British Columbia, Canada to parents Rachel and David A. Chertkow. Her mother was a concert pianist with the Seattle Symphony Orchestra until she got married and moved to Drumheller, Alberta. Growing up in Vancouver, Herbert graduated from Magee Secondary School in 1962 and was crowned AZA sweetheart at their May weekend. Herbert graduated with a Bachelor of Science degree in biochemistry and first-year Medicine from the University of British Columbia in 1966, at the age of 19. Although she was encouraged by her sister and a professor to pursue a PhD, Herbert chose to earn her medical degree so she could combine science with the humanities. After completing her internship and additional training in pediatrics, she worked as a full-service community family physician and clinical instructor at the REACH community health centre in Vancouver from 1971 until 1982.

== Career ==
Herbert joined the full-time faculty in the UBC Department of Family Practice in 1982 and co-founded the Sexual Assault Service for Vancouver. She was eventually appointed the founding Head of the department from 1988 to 1998. Herbert left the position in 1999 to become the Dean of the University of Western Ontario's (UWO) Faculty of Medicine and Dentistry. While serving in this role, she was the recipient of the 2007 YMCA of London Women of Excellence Award in Health, Science and Technology and the North American Primary Care Research Group's Lifetime Achievement Award. As a result of her research, Herbert was named to the provincial panel on fertility treatment and adoption 12-member panel which was expected to recommend ways to help make both fertility treatment and adoption more accessible and affordable. The following year, Herbert was again recognized with an election to the Institute of Medicine (now the National Academy of Medicine). She eventually stepped down as the dean of the Schulich School of Medicine & Dentistry in 2010 and was replaced by Michael J. Strong.

Upon stepping down, Herbert was praised for her contributions to the field of medicine and to UWO. She won the 2010 W. Victor Johnston Medal for lifetime contribution to the College of Family Physicians of Canada and the Ian McWhinney Award for Family Medicine Education. A few years later, in 2015, Herbert was elected president of the Canadian Academy of Health Sciences for two years, until 2017. As president, Herbert was also recognized as part of the College of Family Physicians of Canada's Top 20 Pioneers of Family Medicine Research in Canada. She was specifically recognized for "being among the first female family physician-researchers to promote family medicine research as Dean of a Canadian medical school."

During the COVID-19 pandemic, Herbert was named to the Order of Canada for her "contributions to the fields of clinical and academic medicine, as a family physician, medical educator, researcher and administrator."

== Personal life ==
Carol Herbert (née Chertkow) married Alan Herbert, also known as Larry, in December 1968. Together, they had three children: Jason, Alisa and Keren. They also had four grandchildren. Despite their divorce, she maintained a cordial relationship with her former husband. In 1993, Carol married Fred Swartz, with whom she shares three stepchildren and six step-grandchildren.
