= AIDS Vancouver =

Community support organization

- Vancouver AIDS Society
- Founded: 1983; 43 years ago
- Founders: Gordon Price; Noah Stewart; Dr. Mike Maynard; Daryl Nelson; Ron Alexander Slater
- Type: Charity (Society Act of BC); August 4, 1983; 43 years ago
- Purpose: HIV/AIDS
- Headquarters: 401-1101 Seymour Street; Vancouver, BC; V6B 0R1
- Region served: Lower Mainland
- Services: Support, counselling, resource centre, outreach, grocery program, and advocacy.
- Members: 12 members with 4 positions reserved for HIV+ individuals
- Executive Director: Sarah Chown
- Revenue: $2,427,267 (2023)
- Employees: Full-time 4, Part-time 27
- Volunteers: 200
- Website: aidsvancouver.org

AIDS Vancouver, founded in early 1983, is recognized as one of the first community-based non-profit AIDS organizations in Canada, responding to the HIV/AIDS crisis in the Vancouver area. Led by co-founders Gordon Price, Noah Stewart, Dr. Mike Maynard, Daryl Nelson, and Ron Alexander Slater, the organization has aimed to provide support, education, and advocacy for individuals affected by HIV/AIDS. With a focus on grassroots efforts and community mobilization, AIDS Vancouver has been involved in efforts to address the spread of HIV and support individuals living with the virus. In March 2024, AIDS Vancouver changed its purpose, values, and name to support and empower people living with HIV for years to come, and is now operating as Ribbon Community Society, with its programs and services remaining the same.

== History ==
=== Early concerns and observations ===
In the early 1980s, as reports from the New York Native about a deadly disease circulating within gay communities across the United States spread, concerns heightened in Vancouver.

In mid-1982, four doctors, Brian Willoughby, Bruce Douglas, Peter Constance, and Michael Maynard, who regularly treated gay patients in their medical practices, convened for lunch. The conversation turned to the observation of swollen lymph glands and other unusual symptoms in their patients. This meeting marked the inception of the Vancouver Lymphadenopathy - AIDS study.

=== Grassroots mobilization and local action ===
In November 1982, Gordon Price hosted a small dinner party in Vancouver's West End, attended by Noah Stewart, Dr. Mike Maynard, Ron Alexander Slater, and a close friend. During the gathering, Ron shared an article from The Village Voice discussing Gay-Related Immune Deficiency (GRID), often referred to as "gay cancer," sparking a discussion about its potential impact on Vancouver's gay community.

This conversation led to the group's recognition of the need for local action in response to the emerging AIDS cases. They began reaching out to others in their social circles, understanding the urgency of the situation. This effort marked the beginning stages of what would later evolve into AIDS Vancouver, as concerned individuals mobilized to address the growing crisis.

=== Formation of AIDS Vancouver ===
With much about AIDS still unknown, including its transmission, the epidemic cast a foreboding shadow, cloaked in uncertainty. Taking cues from the efforts in New York City, Gordon Price and co-founders Noah Stewart, Mike Maynard, Daryl Nelson, and Ron Alexander Slate, the man who started it all, took decisive action. They founded AIDS Vancouver in early 1983, one of Canada's first AIDS service organizations, with a mission to offer support to those impacted by the virus.

AIDS Vancouver officially incorporated as the Vancouver AIDS Society under the Society Act of BC on August 4, 1983. This formalized its status as a nonprofit organization and provided a legal framework for its activities.

Initially, the organization operated from the founders' homes, hosting monthly public meetings at the Lotus Hotel. AIDS Vancouver moved to a Davie Street location in 1983.

=== Initiation of collaborative efforts ===
Recognizing the urgency of the situation, Gordon Price sought assistance from Paul Popham, a co-founder of the Gay Men's Health Crisis organization in New York City. Paul promptly traveled to Vancouver to offer his expertise, leading to the first AIDS Information Forum convened by AIDS Vancouver on March 12, 1983, at the Westend Community Centre. This gathering united various speakers to address critical issues related to the epidemic, including contributions from Dr. Maynard and Dr. Willoughby. The presentations, notably Paul Popham's, were filmed by GaybleVision, capturing invaluable insights and marking a significant milestone in AIDS Vancouver's early efforts.

In April 1983, amidst the growing crisis, AIDS Vancouver intensified its efforts to disseminate crucial information. During this period, an article in the Vancouver Sun reported two deaths and seven cases of the disease. Ron Alexander, a founding member of AIDS Vancouver, emphasized the urgency of the situation, asking, "How many more have to die before somebody does something about it?"

In October 1985, four cherry trees were planted near Stanley Park in memory of James, Ivo, Gino, and Randy, who succumbed to AIDS. Named "Our Cherry Grove" within the gay community, it served as a poignant tribute. To shield the trees from potential vandalism fuelled by AIDS/HIV stigma, an AIDS Vancouver spokesperson kept the location undisclosed.

=== Early media initiatives ===
In response to the emerging AIDS crisis and the urgent need for public awareness, GaybleVision, a community television program, aired a pioneering broadcast on August 22, 1983. This initiative provided early insights into the virus, including transmission methods and parallels with hepatitis B. Experts like R.G. Mathias, an epidemiologist at BC Community Health Services, Michael Maynard, and Noah Stewart, co-founders of AIDS Vancouver, discussed the virus and the formation of AIDS Vancouver. This marked a crucial step in early AIDS education, offering valuable information during a time of limited awareness.

== Public health efforts and expansion ==
In response to the escalating HIV/AIDS crisis, AIDS Vancouver initiated various initiatives aimed at public health promotion and expansion of support services.

In 1984, John Blatherwick was appointed Medical Health Officer for Vancouver. He played a key role in coordinating services and disseminating vital information about AIDS, effectively communicating with the media, voicing authoritative opinions on health issues that often appeared on the front pages of newspapers.

Alan Herbert, a board member at AIDS Vancouver, played a crucial role from 1983 to 1987 in securing municipal support from the City of Vancouver. In 1987, the city provided AIDS Vancouver with an initial funding of $50,000 (equivalent to $119,854 in 2025). This financial assistance enabled the organization to establish an office and hire staff, including Michael Welsh and Elaine Smith, who developed Canada's first support programs for AIDS. Bob Tibby was also appointed as an executive coordinator to bolster support initiatives. These efforts were undertaken amidst pervasive fear and stigma surrounding HIV/AIDS, as case numbers surged to epidemic levels. Subsequently, AIDS Vancouver relocated its office in 1988.

In December 1988, AIDS Vancouver collaborated with the Canadian AIDS Society and other organizations to publish the first safe sex guidelines for Canada. Titled 'Safer Sex Guidelines: A Resource Document for Educators and Counsellors,' this publication provided essential information and guidance to educators, counselors, and the general public, contributing significantly to HIV/AIDS prevention efforts nationwide.

Furthermore, in September 2003, Vancouver launched North America's first Supervised Injection Site, Insite, as part of its comprehensive Four Pillars Drug Strategy. This strategy, combining harm reduction measures with treatment, enforcement, and prevention efforts, aimed to address the endemic HIV and hepatitis C among injection drug users in the city's Downtown Eastside neighborhood. AIDS Vancouver, alongside other community organizations, actively supported these harm reduction initiatives, recognizing their importance in curbing the spread of infectious diseases.

== Funding and support ==
AIDS Vancouver operates with the assistance of 31 paid staff and approximately 200 dedicated volunteers. The organization delivers essential support programs and services, including a helpline, case management, a resource center, and a grocery program. It is primarily funded by federal and provincial sources, alongside contributions from donors, engaging in fund development activities to sustain its operations. Key contributors include governmental bodies like the Vancouver Coastal Health Authority and the Public Health Agency of Canada, as well as the BC Gaming Commission.

== Fundraising ==
AIDS Vancouver participates in events such as World AIDS Day and has previously been involved in activities like the AIDS Walk for Life and the We Care Red Ribbon Campaign. Additionally, AIDS Vancouver hosts the Holiday Grocery event annually in December, providing groceries to support the community during the holiday season. Canadian artist Bif Nakedd allocated proceeds from her latest single to support AIDS Vancouver, contributing to the organization's efforts to provide assistance to individuals living with AIDS in the community.

== Community engagement and awareness ==
=== AIDS Quilt exhibit at Vancouver Art Gallery ===
The AIDS Quilt, organized by local volunteers, was displayed at the Vancouver Art Gallery from July 13 to 16, 1989. This exhibit featured the U.S. Names Project AIDS Memorial Quilt. This event represented a significant moment in acknowledging those impacted by AIDS in Vancouver.

=== Gay Games III: Vancouver 1990 ===
The 1990 Gay Games took place in Vancouver, from August 4 to 11, 1990. Approximately 7,300 athletes participated in 27 sports, with an additional 1,500 cultural participants. The opening and closing ceremonies were hosted at BC Place Stadium. This was the first games to be held outside the United States and the first in which Masters world records, with two set in swimming. These Games aimed to raise awareness about AIDS and promote inclusivity.

Notably, Mark Mees, the Executive Director of the Vancouver Gay Games III, later became the Executive Director at AIDS Vancouver from March 1991 to January 1994.

=== PWN: empowering women amidst the HIV/AIDS Crisis ===
The Positive Women's Network (PWN) emerged in 1991 amidst a shortfall in HIV/AIDS research and services, particularly concerning women's needs. Originating from AIDS Vancouver, the organization was founded out of a pressing recognition of the imperative to support women living with HIV/AIDS.

=== Advancements in HIV/AIDS management ===
The XI International AIDS Conference, held in Vancouver from July 7–12, 1996, under the theme "One World One Hope", introduced pivotal advancements in HIV/AIDS management. Canadian epidemiologist Martin Schechter, among others, served as co-chairs. The conference highlighted innovations such as HIV viral load measurement technology and combination therapy with protease inhibitors, revolutionizing HIV/AIDS management.

=== IAS 2015 conference highlights ===
The 8th IAS Conference on HIV Pathogenesis, Treatment & Prevention, held in Vancouver from July 19–22, 2015, emphasized initiating antiretroviral therapy (ART) early for improved health outcomes in people living with HIV (PLHIV). It also addressed the feasibility of pre-exposure prophylaxis (PrEP) among key populations and advancements in HIV cure research. Additionally, the conference highlighted the growing challenges of HIV and hepatitis co-infection and efforts to address them.

== Prevention and education ==
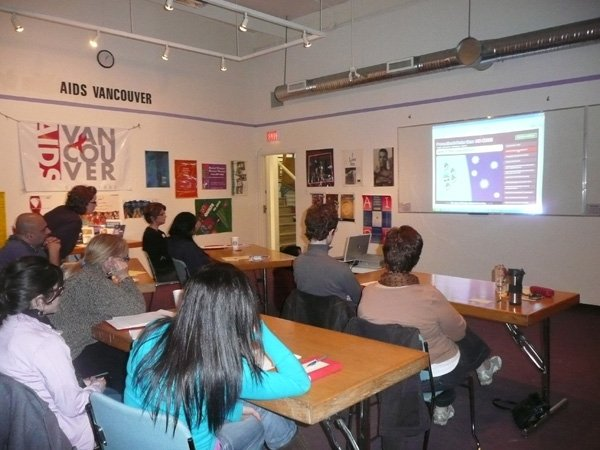
Educational workshop session in progress at AIDS Vancouver.

AIDS Vancouver's Education Workshops and HIV Prevention & Awareness Programs, funded by the Mac AIDS Fund, empower participants to lead discussions on HIV/AIDS and Hepatitis C, while providing trusted materials. These initiatives focus on community education, stigma reduction, and the provision of customized prevention strategies through collaboration with various organizations, aiming to foster a conducive and engaging learning environment.

== HIV support programs ==
AIDS Vancouver provides essential programs and services to individuals impacted by HIV/AIDS, focusing on client support and health promotion.
