= Mark S. King =

American HIV/AIDS activist, blogger, writer, and actor

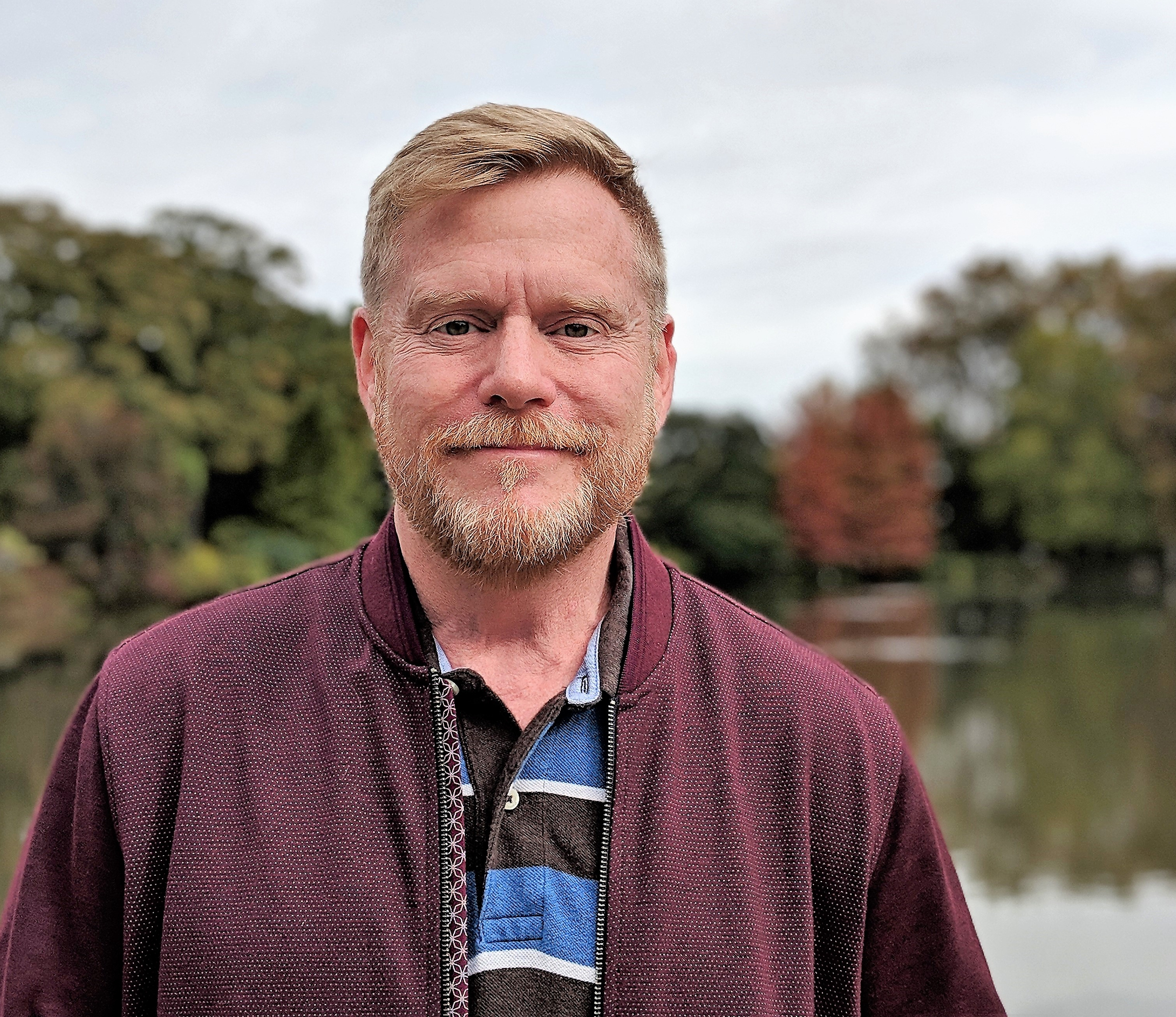
- Mark S. King, Atlanta, Georgia, November 2018
- Born: December 23, 1960 (age 65)
- Occupation: Journalist
- Known for: HIV/AIDS journalism

Mark S. King (born December 23, 1960) is an American HIV/AIDS activist, blogger, writer, and actor. King tested positive for HIV in 1985 and became an HIV/AIDS activist soon after. He was inducted into the Association of LGBTQ+ Journalists Hall of Fame in 2025. In 2020, he received the Sarah Pettit Memorial Award for the LGBTQ Journalist of the Year. He is the creator of the video blog My Fabulous Disease, which won the 2020 GLAAD Media Award for Outstanding Blog. Out magazine named King to its 2020 Out100 list of LGBTQ+ influencers.

== Early life ==
Mark King, one of six siblings, was born on December 23, 1960, to a military family that settled in Shreveport, Louisiana. He graduated from the University of Houston in 1981.

== Career ==
Following college, King went to Hollywood to pursue a career in acting, and appeared in television commercials. While in California, he also owned and operated a gay fantasy phone service, Telerotic. His memoir, A Place Like This, focuses on his time in Los Angeles during the early years of the AIDS pandemic.

After King tested HIV positive in 1985, he became an AIDS activist, and was the first public relations director for the Los Angeles Shanti Foundation. He later served as director of education and communication for AID Atlanta.

King publishes a video blog, My Fabulous Disease, the subjects of which include HIV and AIDS, LGBTQ+ issues, substance abuse, politics, sex, and his own family. King advocates against HIV criminalization and is a proponent of U=U (undetectable = untransmittable) and the use of PrEP.

In 2020 My Fabulous Disease received the GLAAD Media Award for outstanding blog, its fifth nomination. He was named 2020's LGBTQ Journalist of the Year by the Association of LGBTQ Journalists.

King has presented at, and reported on, regional, national, and international HIV/AIDS conferences, including the International AIDS Conference. His coverage of AIDS2016 in Durban, South Africa, was featured in materials for the Elizabeth Taylor AIDS Foundation.

King's articles, blog entries, videos, and commentaries have appeared in Huffpost, TheBody.com, The Advocate, and Poz Magazine, among others. He has been interviewed or cited on NBC, CNN, NPR, Salon, and the Washington Post. He also participated in the original "Let's Stop HIV Together" campaign launched in 2012 by the Centers for Disease Control.

In 2013, HIV Equal included him in a list of thirteen notable HIV/AIDS activists.

== Personal life ==
King tested positive for HIV in 1985, the year testing became publicly available. King is openly gay, and is also open about his addiction to alcohol and drugs, particularly crystal methamphetamine. According to HuffPost, he has slept with close to 10,000 men. He has been sober since 2012. In 2015 he married Michael Mitchell.

== Selected publications ==
- My Fabulous Disease: Chronicles of a Gay Survivor (2023)
- A Place Like This: A Memoir (2007)
- "Suicide, A Love Story," in Shades of Blue, Amy Ferris, ed. (2015)
- My Fabulous Disease (video blog)
- "David Furnish talks Sir Elton, PrEP and U=U at AIDS2018 Confab," Queerty, August 1, 2018 (interviewing David Furnish)
- "Finding Larry Kramer," Poz Magazine, May 15, 2018 (interviewing Larry Kramer)

== Films and television ==
- Featured participant, Meth (2006)
- Producer, actor, Merce, Seasons 1 & 2
- Contestant, The Price is Right (1980)

== Selected conferences ==
- 2018 OHTN Research Conference, Toronto, ON (plenary speaker)
- 2018 United States Conference on AIDS (plenary speaker)
- 2015 NLGJA Conference (plenary panel moderator)
- 2013 ADAP Advocacy Association Annual Conference (panelist)

== Awards and recognition ==
- 2025—Inducted into the NLGJA: The Association of LGBTQ+ Journalists Hall of Fame.
- 2020—Named to the Out (magazine) 2020 Out100 List,
- 2020—Outstanding Blog, GLAAD Media Award, for My Fabulous Disease (nominated in 2015, 2017, 2018, 2019, and 2020.).
- 2020—Sarah Pettit Memorial Award for the LGBTQ Journalist of the Year, The Association of LGBTQ+ Journalists.
- 2014, 2016, 2020 – Excellence in Blogging Award, The Association of LGBTQ+ Journalists, First place, for My Fabulous Disease
- 2013 – Listed in "Legendary Activists in the Fight Against AIDS" in HIV Equal
- 2013 – Selected as a Grand Marshall for Atlanta Pride Parade
- 2011, 2018 – Listed in Poz Magazine's "Poz 100"
- 2010 – Included in "The Best of 'It Gets Better'", The Advocate, October 4, 2010
