= 1993 Vancouver municipal election =

- November 21, 1993
- Turnout: 36%
- Mayoral election
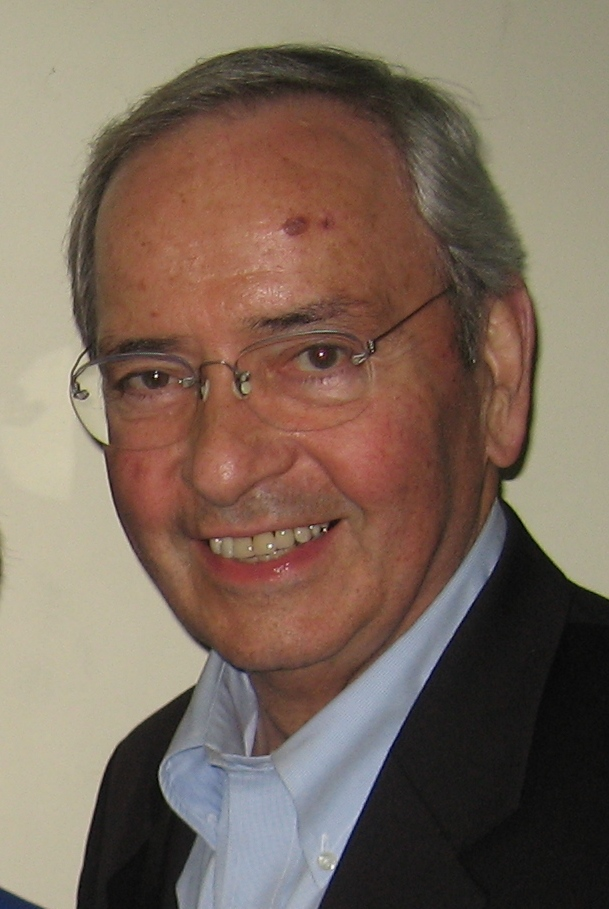

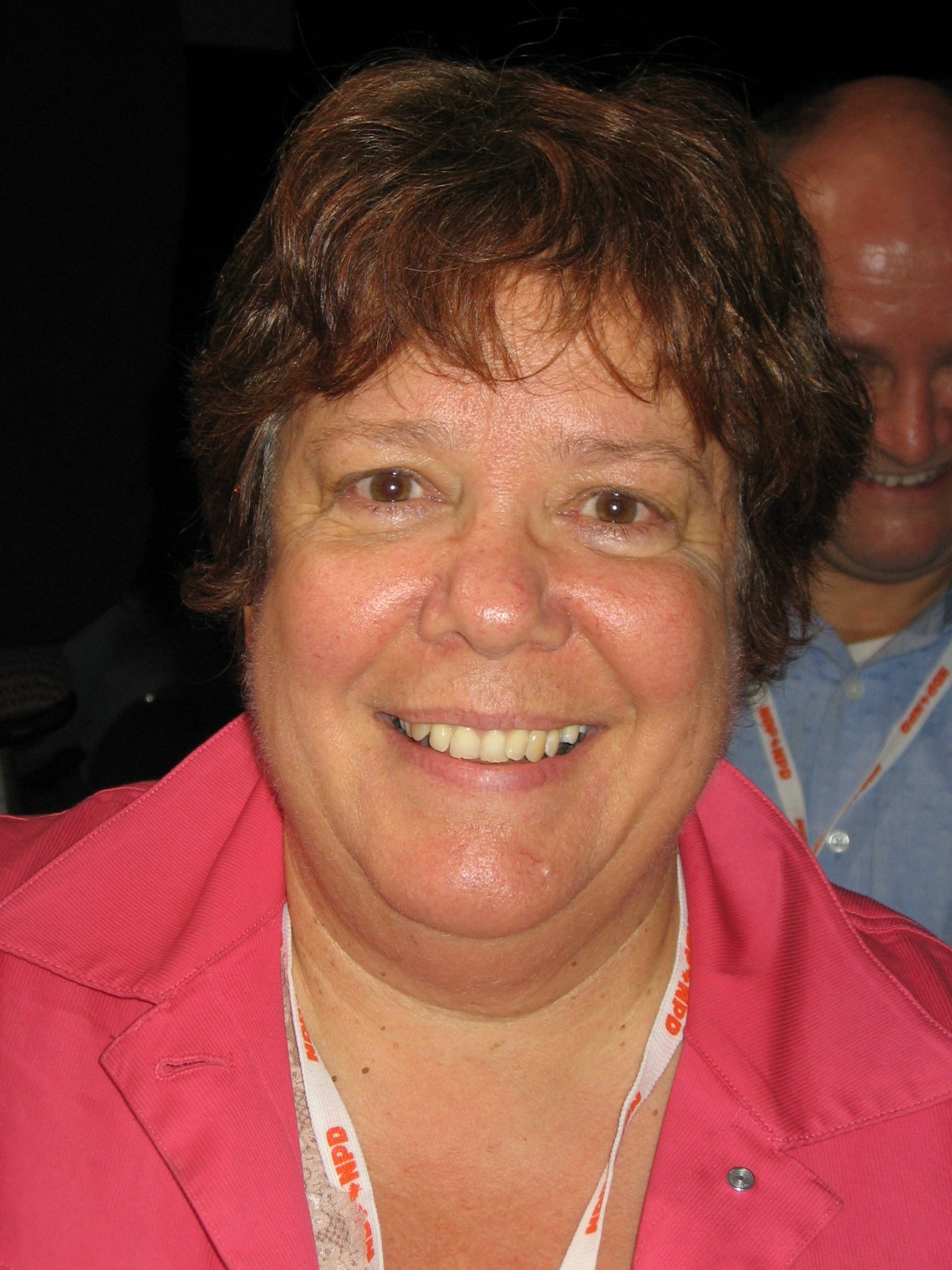
Candidate	Philip Owen	Libby Davies
Party	NPA	COPE
Popular vote	46,687	37,812
Percentage	50.03%	40.52%
Mayor before election
Gordon Campbell
NPA
Elected Mayor
Philip Owen
NPA
- Other elections
Party	Leader	Vote %	Seats	+/–
City Council (10 seats)
NPA			9	+4
COPE			1	−4
Park Board (7 seats)
NPA			5	+1
COPE			2	0
School Board (9 seats)
NPA			7	+2
COPE			2	0
This lists parties that won seats. See the complete results below.

The 1993 Vancouver municipal election was held on November 21, 1993, the same day as other municipalities and regional districts in British Columbia selected their new municipal governments. Voters elected a mayor, 10 city councillors, 7 park board commissioners, and 9 school board trustees through plurality-at-large voting.

== Candidates and results ==
=== Parties ===
Four parties fielded candidates for election in the 1993 election.

Party	Leader	Political position	Notes
Civic Association of Independent Reformers (CAIR)	Rod Raglin	Reform, Centre-Right	Focused on opposition to the party system, promotion of a ward-based electoral system, imposing term-limits, and supporting "independent minded" candidates.
Coalition of Progressive Electors	Libby Davies	Left	Created from a merger between the Civic NDP and Committee of Progressive Electors. Branded in this election as "COPE '93".
Green Party of Vancouver		Centre-left, green politics	
Non-Partisan Association	Philip Owen	Centre-right	

=== Mayor ===
Bob Seeman, a 30-year-old lawyer, was the first major candidate to announce a bid for the office of mayor, and began campaigning in August. Characterized in the media as following in the footsteps of Ross Perot, Seeman described himself as "fiscally right wing" and "environmentally left wing". Seeman noted in a Vancouver Sun op-ed that he was concerned about the merger of COPE and the Civic New Democrats, accusing politicians of being bought by "unions and big business", and praising the upstart National and Reform parties. Near the end of the campaign, Seeman "crashed" a debate held by the CBC at the Vancouver East Cultural Centre between Owen and Davies, taking the stage and demanding to be included. This was met with boos from the audience, to which Seeman responded by asking all those who wished him to leave to raise their hands. The crowd overwhelmingly supported his exclusion, to which Seeman responded with, "Thank you for treating me a second-class candidate," while being heckled by the audience.

In mid-August, the NPA board and councillors announced they had rallied around three-term councillor Philip Owen to succeed outgoing mayor Gordon Campbell. Owen had extensive political experience, running for council in 1976, 1980, 1982, and 1984, as well as standing unsuccessfully as a provincial Social Credit candidate in 1983 and serving on the Vancouver Parks Board from 1978 to 1980. Owen, a member of an evangelical congregation within the Anglican Church of Canada, came under fire for his nods to voters on the Christian right, such as indicating he drew inspiration from Chuck Colson and for lengthy profiles in right-wing Christian publications. Lauded for his transparency and commitment to accountability, Owen's campaign focused on supporting business and opposing property tax increases and excessive spending on the part of the civic government.

In the wake of the Civic NDP and Committee of Progressive Electors merger, the new Coalition of Progressive Electors nominated five-term councillor Libby Davies for the mayor's chair. Davies had ruminated on a potential run for months and announced her intentions in early September. Criticized in the media for a lack of charisma, even Davies' opponents noted her down-to-earth likeability and her knowledgeable nature. Davies' campaign focused on creating ward boundaries, a more regional focus for planning and transportation issues, and a desire to fix what she saw as Vancouver's looming housing crisis.

An independent candidate, Angus Macdonald, ran to show that anyone could participate in the electoral process and advocate for their community.

1993 Vancouver municipal election: Vancouver mayor
Party	Candidate	Votes	%	Elected
NPA	Philip Owen	46,687	50.03%	✓
COPE	Libby Davies	37,812	40.52%	
Independent	Bob Seeman	4,834	5.18%	
Independent	Jonathan Himsworth	683	0.73%	
Independent	Stu Campbell	581	0.62%	
Independent	The Captain	403	0.43%	
Independent	Angus Ian Macdonald	317	0.34%	
Independent	Brian G. Salmi	259	0.28%	
Independent	Shane McCune	234	0.25%	
Independent	Sandy Beach	207	0.22%	
Independent	Helder J. Fernandes	157	0.17%	
Independent	Jeremy Price	148	0.16%	
Independent	Marion Drakos	148	0.16%	
Independent	Terry K. Dunne	147	0.16%	
Independent	Matthew A. Martin	111	0.12%	
Independent	Wretched Ethyl	110	0.12%	
Independent	Arne Hansen	109	0.12%	
Independent	Ari Benbasat	109	0.12%	
Independent	Mike Chivilo	102	0.11%	
Independent	Rojer Streets	43	0.05%	
Independent	Jonathan Hagey	41	0.04%	
Independent	Sean Veley	35	0.04%	
Independent	Evan Ozirny	33	0.04%	

=== City councillors ===
1993 Vancouver municipal election: Vancouver City Council
Party	Candidate	Votes	%	Elected
NPA	Lynne Kennedy (Incumbent)	44,542		✓
NPA	Don Bellamy (Incumbent)	42,281		✓
NPA	Gordon H. Price (Incumbent)	41,982		✓
NPA	George J. Puil (Incumbent)	41,970		✓
NPA	Maggie Ip	39,409		✓
NPA	Jennifer Clarke	39,377		✓
NPA	Sam Sullivan	35,770		✓
NPA	Nancy Chiavario	35,214		✓
NPA	Craig Hemer	33,954		✓
COPE	Jenny Kwan	32,150		✓
COPE	Merrilee Robson	30,502		
COPE	Ragini Rankin	28,409		
COPE	Ken Walker	26,708		
COPE	Mel Lehan	26,539		
COPE	Jim O'Dea	26,480		
COPE	Maita Santiago	26,018		
COPE	Frances Wasserlein	25,830		
COPE	Sadie Kuehn	25,781		
NPA	Daljit Sidhu	24,066		
COPE	Hardev S. Bal	21,302		
Independent	Anne Beer	18,559		
Independent	Graham Leslie	11,100		
Green	Andy Telfer	10,668		
Green	Jacqui Underwood	10,130		
CAIR	Rod Raglin	9,143		
Independent	Vincent Wong	8,161		
CAIR	David J. Gardiner	7,761		
Independent	Tom Tsang	6,863		
CAIR	Frank Battista	5,425		
CAIR	John H. Jeffery	5,326		
Independent	Alan Clapp	5,176		
Independent	Tim Shen	4,593		
CAIR	Richard Nantel	4,508		
Independent	John Taylor	4,373		
Independent	Richard Wood	4,090		
Independent	Elisa Lay	3,663		
Independent	Kent Lindsay	3,660		
Independent	Joan Rowntree	3,400		
Independent	Don West	3,153		
Independent	Cowboy Ellis	3,138		
Independent	Dan Doherty	3,008		
Independent	Kentish Steele	2,754		
Independent	James "Kickback" Faraday	2,176		
Independent	Kenneth S. Doughie	1,680		
Independent	Phil Dureau	1,504		
Independent	Saga D. Gounder	721		

=== Party standings in Vancouver City Council ===
Party	Seats on city council
NPA	9 / 10
COPE	1 / 10

=== Park board commissioners ===
Top 7 candidates elected

1993 Vancouver municipal election: Vancouver Park Board
Party	Candidate	Votes	%	Elected
NPA	Malcolm Ashford (Incumbent)	37,146		✓
COPE	Tim Louis (Incumbent)	35,092		✓
NPA	Duncan Wilson	33,615		✓
NPA	Allan De Genova	33,314		✓
NPA	David Chesman	33,258		✓
NPA	Alan Fetherstonhaugh	31,705		✓
COPE	Donna Morgan	30,130		✓
COPE	Cindy Ladner	29,846		
NPA	Rolly Scov	29,437		
COPE	Dermot Foley (Incumbent)	28,243		
Independent	Anita Romaniuk	27,171		
Independent	Fred Jay	26,416		
NPA	Kewal Pabla	25,885		
COPE	Babu Bansal	19,913		
Independent	Susan Lee	14,609		
Green	Bob Chorush	12,029		
Independent	Nicole Kohnert	11,970		
Independent	Dick Seaton	7,298		
CAIR	Stan Bennett	7,170		
Independent	Helen Dunbar	7,019		
Independent	Wesley Jang	6,269		
Independent	David Atherton	5,892		
Independent	Doug Harris	5,560		
Independent	David Stewart	5,018		
CAIR	Harvey Pudwell	4,948		
Independent	Eleanor Hadley	4,088		
Independent	Judith Hodgins	2,678		
Independent	Robert Blackwell	2,671		
Independent	Michael Robson	2,631		
Independent	Gregg Simpson	2,566		
Independent	Gary Crane	2,560		
Independent	James Petrie	2,338		
Independent	David Moir	1,898		
Independent	Daniel Burns	1,854		
Independent	David Ferreira	1,785		
Independent	Michael Tusa	1,774		
Independent	Walter Einarson	1,516		
Independent	Larry Muscatt	1,419		
Independent	Adam Barbolet	1,399		
Independent	Jeremy Bramwell	1,356		
Independent	Doug Bjorkman	1,054		

=== Party standings in Vancouver Park Board ===
Party	Seats on park board
NPA	5 / 7
COPE	2 / 7

=== School board trustees ===
Top 9 candidates elected

1993 Vancouver municipal election: Vancouver School Board
Party	Candidate	Votes	%	Elected
NPA	Sandy McCormick	41,802		✓
NPA	Ken Denike (Incumbent)	41,419		✓
NPA	Carol McRae	40,283		✓
NPA	John Cheng (Incumbent)	38,650		✓
NPA	Ted Hunt	37,438		✓
NPA	Bill Brown	36,992		✓
NPA	John Robertson	34,297		✓
COPE	Yvonne Brown	33,307		✓
COPE	Anne Roberts	32,202		✓
COPE	Eileen Wong	31,543		
NPA	Laurie Throness	31,535		
COPE	Philip Yung	31,143		
COPE	Gary Onstad (Incumbent)	30,831		
COPE	Ruth Herman (Incumbent)	30,763		
NPA	Iqbal Sara	26,950		
COPE	Paul Gill	26,942		
COPE	Eduardo Aragon	26,462		
COPE	Alayne Keough	25,876		
Independent	Jean McCutcheon	14,167		
Independent	Paul Alexander	10,388		
Independent	Dawn Henderson	8,658		
Independent	Richard Kwan	8,290		
Independent	David Green	7,618		
Independent	Steve Hopkins	6,152		
Independent	Doug Ragan	6,018		
Independent	Marietta Einarson	4,755		
Independent	Aaron Edwards	4,278		
Independent	Michael Savage	4,234		

=== Party standings in Vancouver School Board ===
Party	Seats on school board
NPA	7 / 9
COPE	2 / 9
