= Non-Partisan Association =

Inactive municipal political party in Vancouver, Canada

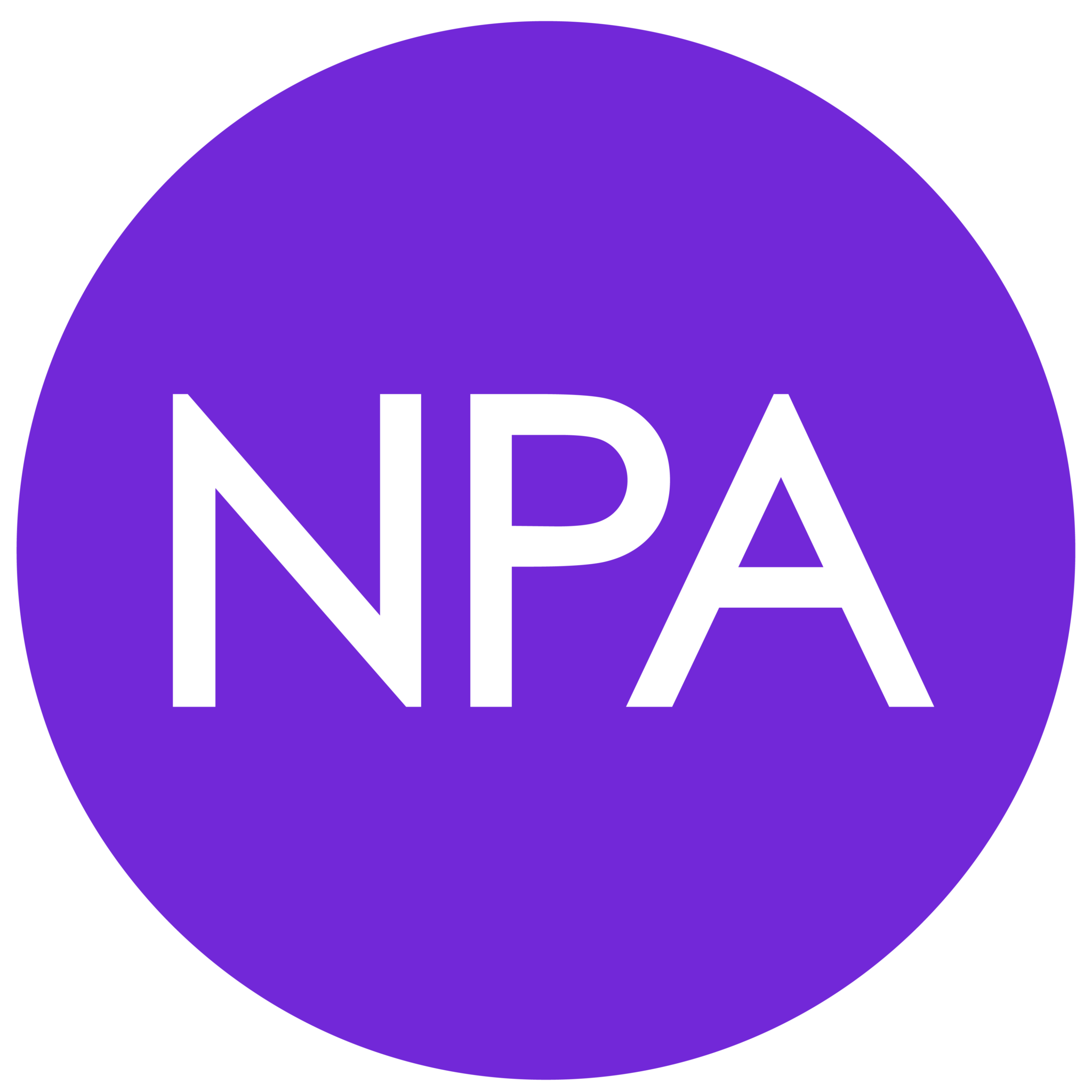
- Abbreviation: NPA
- President: David Mawhinney
- Founded: November 13, 1937
- Ideology: Conservatism
- Political position: Centre-right to right-wing
- Colours: Purple
- City council: 0 / 11
- Park board: 0 / 7
- School board: 0 / 9

Website
- npavancouver.ca

The Non-Partisan Association (NPA) is an inactive municipal political party in Vancouver, British Columbia, Canada. It was established by the city's business leaders in 1937 to challenge the democratic socialist Co-operative Commonwealth Federation (CCF) in that year's municipal election. The party has historically been described as centre-right and drawn its strongest support from Vancouver's business community.

In the years following the 2018 municipal election, seven of the NPA's ten elected officials resigned from the party, claiming that it had become right-wing and undemocratic. Several other prominent members, such as the NPA's 2018 mayoral candidate Ken Sim, also resigned. Most of those departing later joined ABC Vancouver in the run-up to the 2022 municipal election, which saw Sim elected as mayor and the NPA lose all its remaining seats.

== History ==
=== Early years ===
The NPA was established by Vancouver's business leaders on November 13, 1937, to counteract the growing influence of the CCF. Fearful of a CCF victory in the Vancouver municipal election on December 8, 1937, provincial politicians from the then-ruling BC Liberal Party launched an initiative to create a pro-business municipal party to challenge the CCF. The NPA's first chairman was Victor Odlum, a prominent member of Vancouver's business and political elite who had served as a Liberal MLA from 1924 to 1928. Other founding members of the NPA include W. C. Woodward of Woodward's department store, Victor Spencer of Spencer's department store, and industrialist Austin Taylor. Despite its party connections, the NPA claimed it was not a party, but rather a "free enterprise coalition" which "oppose[d] the introduction of party politics into Vancouver's civic administration".

The NPA first fielded candidates in the December 9, 1936, municipal election, which saw their mayoral candidate, George Miller, elected to office. Miller later ran in provincial elections for the BC Progressive Conservative Party. Prior to the 1939 election, a member of the NPA's executive, Nelson Spencer, broke away from the party and ran independently after the NPA chose the then-incumbent Miller as its mayoral candidate instead of Spencer. The result was that the right-wing vote was split, and CCF candidate Lyle Telford was elected. Telford would only serve one term before NPA candidate Jack Cornett was elected in the 1940 election, beginning a decades-long period of NPA dominance on Vancouver City Council.

=== 21st century ===
The NPA's previous logo, in use until 2014

Jennifer Clarke was chosen to be the NPA's mayoral candidate for the 2002 municipal election, as opposed to the then-incumbent mayor Philip Owen. Owen had been in disagreement with the rest of the party leadership due to his support for harm reduction programs in the Downtown Eastside, although Clarke stated she was also in favour of such programs. The NPA ultimately lost the mayoral race, as well as its majority on city council that it had maintained since 1986.

Long-time city councillor Sam Sullivan was chosen as the NPA's candidate for the 2005 mayoral race, which he later won. The NPA also regained its majority on city council, winning a total of six seats.

Peter Ladner was the NPA's mayoral candidate for the 2008 municipal election but was defeated by Gregor Robertson, the candidate for Vision Vancouver. The NPA's electoral platform during the 2008 election focused on reducing crime, improving housing affordability, leveraging the 2010 Winter Olympics, protecting the environment, advancing the city's arts and culture sector, and working collaboratively with senior levels of government, community groups, and the private sector.

The party, led by Suzanne Anton as the NPA's mayoral candidate, once again lost to Robertson and Vision Vancouver in the 2011 municipal election but elected two members to Vancouver City Council. Two members were also elected to the Park Board, and three members to the Vancouver School Board.

On October 16, 2016, provincial education minister Mike Bernier fired the school trustees elected during the 2014 municipal election for failing to pass a balanced budget. NPA incumbent Fraser Ballantyne was re-elected in the subsequent 2017 municipal by-election, alongside newcomer Lisa Dominato.

City councillor Rebecca Bligh announced on December 6, 2019, that she was leaving the NPA but would continue to serve as an independent. She cited concerns over the NPA's newly elected executive team, which included members publicly opposed to the provincial sexual orientation and gender identification (SOGI) curriculum and former staff of the far-right Rebel Media. Other high profile NPA members, such as city councillor Sarah Kirby-Yung and 2018 mayoral candidate Ken Sim, also voiced concerns over the party's perceived shift to the right.

Three of the NPA's four remaining councillors – Lisa Dominato, Colleen Hardwick, and Sarah Kirby-Yung – announced on April 21, 2021, that they would be leaving the NPA to sit as independents, following the decision of the board to appoint Park Board commissioner John Coupar as the 2022 NPA mayoral candidate, the board's refusal to hold an annual general meeting despite a request to do so from all its elected politicians, and broad accusations of a lack of transparency on the board's behalf. Two days later, all three of the NPA's school trustees resigned from the party as well, leaving an elected caucus of one councillor (Melissa De Genova) and two Park Board commissioners (John Coupar and Tricia Barker). On August 5, 2022, Coupar resigned as the NPA's mayoral candidate, with the party indicating it would nominate a new candidate before the ballot deadline. Fred Harding, a retired police officer who ran for mayor with the Vancouver 1st party in the 2018 election, was subsequently announced as the NPA's new mayoral candidate.

Most of the elected officials who resigned from the NPA later joined ABC Vancouver in the run-up to the 2022 municipal election, which saw Ken Sim elected as mayor and the defeat of all NPA incumbents.

== Electoral results ==
The NPA held a majority on Vancouver City Council from 1941 to 1967, 1970 to 1972, 1978 to 1980, 1986 to 2002, and from 2005 to 2008. It held the mayor's office from 1941 to 1958, from 1963 to 1966, from 1986 to 2002, and from 2005 to 2008. Over the years, its opposition has been The Electors' Action Movement (TEAM) in the 1970s, the left-wing Coalition of Progressive Electors (COPE) in the 1980s and 1990s, and centre-left Vision Vancouver in the 2000s and 2010s.

By September 2026, The Tyee described the NPA as defunct. However, it remained registered with Elections BC as the Civic Non-Partisan Association as of October 17, 2026.

There have been eleven NPA mayors of Vancouver:

- Jack (Jonathan Webster) Cornett (1941–1946)
- Gerry McGeer (1947)
- Charles E. Jones (1947–1948)
- George Clark Miller (acting) (1948)
- Charles Edwin Thompson (1949–1950)
- Frederick Hume (1951–1958)
- William Rathie (1963–1966)
- Tom Campbell (1967–1972) (Note: During his mayoral tenure, Tom Campbell sat as an independent from 1967 to 1970 and as an NPA member from 1970 to 1972.)
- Gordon Campbell (1986–1993)
- Philip Owen (1993–2002)
- Sam Sullivan (2005–2008)

=== Results since 1970 ===
NPA election results for mayor of Vancouver, 1970 to present
Election year	Candidate	Votes	%	Position	Result
1970	Tom Campbell	54,253	45.1	1st	Elected
1972	None	–	–	–	Did not contest
1974	George Puil	27,686	35.1	2nd	Not elected
1976	Edward Sweeney	21,924	24.4	2nd	Not elected
1978	Supported Jack Volrich (independent)	45,742	49.2	▲1st	Elected
1980	Jack Volrich	47,107	44.1	▼2nd	Not elected
1982	Jonathan Baker	36,073	31.2	2nd	Not elected
1984	Bill Vander Zalm	49,957	35.7	2nd	Not elected
1986	Gordon Campbell	77,562	55.7	▲1st	Elected
1988	Gordon Campbell	75,545	62.6	1st	Elected
1990	Gordon Campbell	67,950	53.7	1st	Elected
1993	Philip Owen	46,687	50.0	1st	Elected
1996	Philip Owen	50,969	53.15	1st	Elected
1999	Philip Owen	51,085	54.19	1st	Elected
2002	Jennifer Clarke	41,936	30.01	▼2nd	Not elected
2005	Sam Sullivan	61,543	47.34	▲1st	Elected
2008	Peter Ladner	48,794	39.26	▼2nd	Not elected
2011	Suzanne Anton	58,152	40.15	2nd	Not elected
2014	Kirk LaPointe	73,443	40.42	2nd	Not elected
2018	Ken Sim	48,748	28.16	2nd	Not elected
2022	Fred Harding	3,905	2.32	▼5th	Not elected
2026	None	–	–	–	Did not contest

NPA election results for Vancouver City Council, 1970 to present
Election	Seats	+/–	Votes	%	Change (pp)	Position
1970	7 / 11	▼1	435,906	41.9	▼5.5	Majority government
1972	1 / 11	▼6	141,762	19.3	▼22.6	Opposition
1974	4 / 11	▲3	237,764	34.4	▲15.1	Opposition
1976	3 / 11	▼1	228,164	29.4	▼5.0	Opposition
1978	5 / 11	▲2	216,176	28.8	▼0.6	Minority government
1980	5 / 11	Steady	351,802	38.2	▲9.4	Opposition
1982	3 / 11	▼2	367,305	37.0	▼1.2	Opposition
1984	3 / 11	Steady	428,884	36.0	▼1.0	Opposition
1985 (Note: By-election: voters were asked to elect one city councillor.)	3 / 11	Steady	44,096	47.2	▲11.2	Opposition
1986	8 / 11	▲5	503,683	42.2	▼5.0	Majority government
1988	7 / 11	▼1	485,295	43.0	▲0.8	Majority government
1990	6 / 11	▼1	446,624	41.4	▼1.6	Majority government
1992	7 / 11	▲1	11,573	42.5	▲1.1	Majority government
1993	10 / 11	▲3	378,505	47.7	▲5.2	Majority government
1996	11 / 11	▲1	422,118	50.54	▲2.84	Majority government
1999	9 / 11	▼2	361,315	45.29	▼5.25	Majority government
2002	2 / 11	▼7	368,068	32.13	▼13.16	Opposition
2005	6 / 11	▲4	498,082	45.96	▲13.83	Majority government
2008	1 / 11	▼5	394,839	38.00	▼7.96	Opposition
2011	2 / 11	▲1	456,256	37.88	▼0.12	Opposition
2014	3 / 11	▲1	474,841	32.68	▼5.20	Opposition
2017	4 / 11	▲1	13,372	27.83	▼4.85	Opposition
2018	5 / 11	▲1	347,752	24.83	▼3.00	Crossbench
2022	0 / 11	▼5	82,608	6.14	▼18.69	No seats
2025 (Note: By-election: voters were asked to elect two city councillors.)	0 / 11	Steady	–	–	–	Did not contest
2026	0 / 11	Steady	–	–	–	Did not contest

== See also ==
- List of mayors of Vancouver
