= Gordon Price =

Canadian politician

Vancouver City Councillor
- In office November 1986 – November 16, 2002

Personal details
- Born: 1949 (age 76–77) Victoria, British Columbia
- Party: Non-Partisan Association
- Spouse: Len Sobo
- Education: University of Victoria
- Occupation: Urban planner
- Profession: Professor and Director, The City Program; Simon Fraser University; 2004 - 2016
- Known for: Co-founder AIDS Vancouver; HIV/AIDS Advocacy; LGBT Activist
- Awards: 2003 Plan Canada Award, Article of the Year 2007 Smart Growth BC's Smarty Award 2010 Metro Vancouver RAIC Award of Excellence, Advocate of Architecture and Community 2012 Simon Fraser University President’s Award
- Website: viewpointvancouver.ca

Gordon H. Price is a Canadian urban planner, gay rights activist, and former politician who served as a member of Vancouver City Council from 1986 to 2002 representing the Non-Partisan Association (NPA). He was the first openly gay member of the council. During his tenure, he also served on the boards of Metro Vancouver and TransLink. Since retiring from politics, he has remained active in urban affairs.

== Community activism and advocacy ==
Price became prominent for leading a campaign to address street prostitution in Vancouver's West End neighbourhood. Forming the grassroots group CROWE (Concerned Residents of the West End) in 1981, Price aimed to maintain peace and livability in the area. The group sought to address the presence of sex workers in residential streets, drawing support from a diverse coalition of community members, including gay men, seniors, and heterosexual residents. However, the coalition's approach, emphasizing exclusionary and punitive measures, influenced perceptions of neighbourhood belonging, urban ideals, and community safety.

Price is known for his grassroots involvement as a co-founder of AIDS Vancouver in early 1983, one of the first organizations in Canada to address the AIDS crisis. He helped establish the organization with a focus on providing support, education, and advocacy for individuals affected by HIV/AIDS.

== Post-political career and continued engagement ==
Since retiring from office after serving 16 years, Price transitioned into roles as a writer, public lecturer, and professor, focusing on urban renewal and transportation planning issues. He contributed a column to the magazine Business in Vancouver. Additionally, he served as the director of the City Program, a continuing education initiative in urban planning and sustainable community development at Simon Fraser University from 2004 to 2016.

In 2009, Price was appointed by Gregor Robertson, the mayor of Vancouver, to the city's "Greenest City Action Team", an ongoing appointment. In 2015, Vancouver won a C40 Cities award, given in recognition of cities that demonstrate world-leading sustainability initiatives.

Price has been a consistent advocate for cycling infrastructure in Vancouver, notably concerning the implementation of bike lanes on the Burrard Bridge. Despite facing initial opposition and setbacks, his efforts played a crucial role in the project's eventual success, reflecting effective planning, engineering, and political perseverance. Acknowledged as essential to the city's evolving cycling network and urban development, his advocacy highlights the impact of incremental commitments to cycling infrastructure on Vancouver's identity and culture.

In November 2013, Price and his partner Len Sobo, who had been together for 25 years as of 2013 and 35 years as of 2023, and are residents of the West End, were featured by Vancouver Cycle Chic for their active engagement in cycling and their commitment to sustainable living. They spent the day together, resulting in the creation of a short film documenting their experience.

=== Perspectives on urban development ===
In an interview conducted by Squamish council chairperson Khelsilem from a cafe in the Kitsilano neighborhood in 2022, former Vancouver city councillor Gordon Price raised concerns that reflect broader debates about the balance between Indigenous sovereignty, urban development, and community engagement in projects like Sen̓áḵw. His perspective highlights the need for careful consideration of diverse interests and values in shaping the future of urban spaces. In response, Khelsilem emphasized the importance of regaining control over resources to support their community and highlighted the nation's track record of developing rental housing.

=== Criticism of Squamish Nation housing development ===
In 2022, Price criticized a 12-tower housing development project by the Squamish Nation on First Nations land adjacent to the city of Vancouver. Price argued that Squamish Nation was not engaging in "an Indigenous way of building." Price said that the development, which could not be blocked by the Vancouver City Council, ran contrary to the land back movement, "It’s basically, ‘You f—ked us, now we f—k you.’ That’s no basis for reconciliation. That’s not gonna work. That’s awful." Price also asked "Where are the studies?" on the project's de-emphasis on parking spots and focus on public transit, bicycling infrastructure and walkability.
