= McBeath =

McBeath is a surname. Notable people with the surname include:

- Arthur McBeath (1876–1945), Australian cricketer
- Dan McBeath (1897–1963), New Zealand cricketer
- Darin McBeath (born 1976), Canadian alpine skier
- George McBeath (died 1812), Canadian fur trader
- Malcolm McBeath (1880–1957), Canadian mayor
- Michael McBeath (born 1950), Zimbabwean cyclist
- Robert McBeath (1898–1922), Scottish recipient of the Victoria Cross in World War I
- Tom McBeath (born 1946), Canadian actor
- William McBeath (1856–1917), Scottish footballer
