= Robert Henry Otley Gale =

Canadian politician

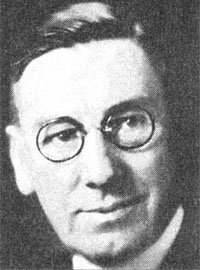

18th Mayor of Vancouver
- In office 1918–1921
- Preceded by: Malcolm Peter McBeath
- Succeeded by: Charles Edward Tisdall

Personal details
- Born: C. November 1878 Quebec
- Died: July 26, 1950 (aged 71)
- Party: Conservative

Robert Henry Otley Gale (1878 – 26 July 1950) was the 18th mayor of Vancouver, British Columbia from 1918 to 1921. He was born in Quebec.

He became mayor after winning a massive victory over incumbent Malcolm McBeath by 3300 votes following a prohibition-related scandal.

== Achievements ==
Robert Gale Promoted the recognition of Vancouver as a major Western Port of Canada.
