= Robert Alexander Anderson (politician) =

Canadian politician

4th Mayor of Vancouver
- In office 1894–1894
- Preceded by: Frederick Cope
- Succeeded by: Henry Collins

Personal details
- Born: 14 August 1856 Armagh, County Armagh, Ireland
- Died: 5 December 1916 (aged 60) New Westminster, British Columbia, Canada
- Party: Independent

Robert Alexander Anderson (14 August 1856 – 5 December 1916) was a Canadian politician, and the fourth mayor of Vancouver, British Columbia, serving one term in 1894. He had previously served as an alderman, from 1892 to 1893. He was born in Armagh, Ireland and died in New Westminster, British Columbia.
