= Buscombe =

Buscombe is a surname. Notable people with the surname include:

- Frederick Buscombe (1862–1938), Canadian mayor
- Lisa Buscombe, Canadian archer
- Peta Buscombe, Baroness Buscombe (born 1954), English barrister and politician
- Ruth Buscombe (born 1989), British Formula One strategy engineer

== See also ==
- Buscombe Lake, a lake of Nova Scotia, Canada
- Camille Buscomb (born 1990), New Zealand long-distance runner
