= List of mayors of Vancouver =

Mayor of Vancouver
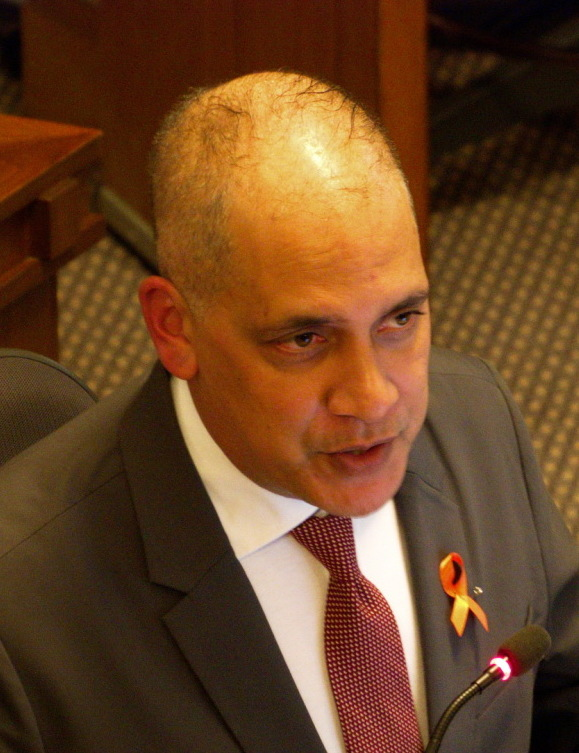
- Incumbent; Pete Fry since November 2, 2026
- Style: His Worship; Mayor (informal)
- Member of: Vancouver City Council
- Reports to: Vancouver City Council
- Seat: Vancouver City Hall
- Term length: One year (until 1940); Two years (1940–1990); Three years (1990–2014); Four years (since 2014); No restriction on renewal
- Inaugural holder: Malcolm A. MacLean
- Formation: 1886; 140 years ago
- Salary: CA$214,442.67 (2026)
- Website: mayorofvancouver.ca

The mayor of Vancouver is the head and chief executive officer of Vancouver, British Columbia, who is elected for a four-year term. The 42nd and current officeholder is Pete Fry, who has held office since November 2, 2026.

== List ==
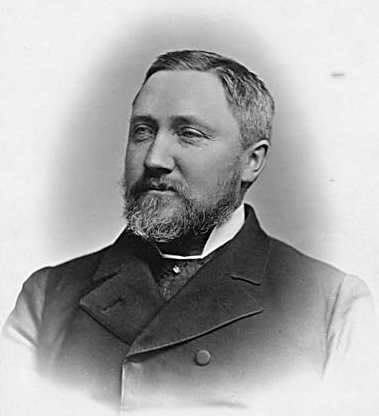
Malcolm A. MacLean (1842–1895) was the first mayor of Vancouver.

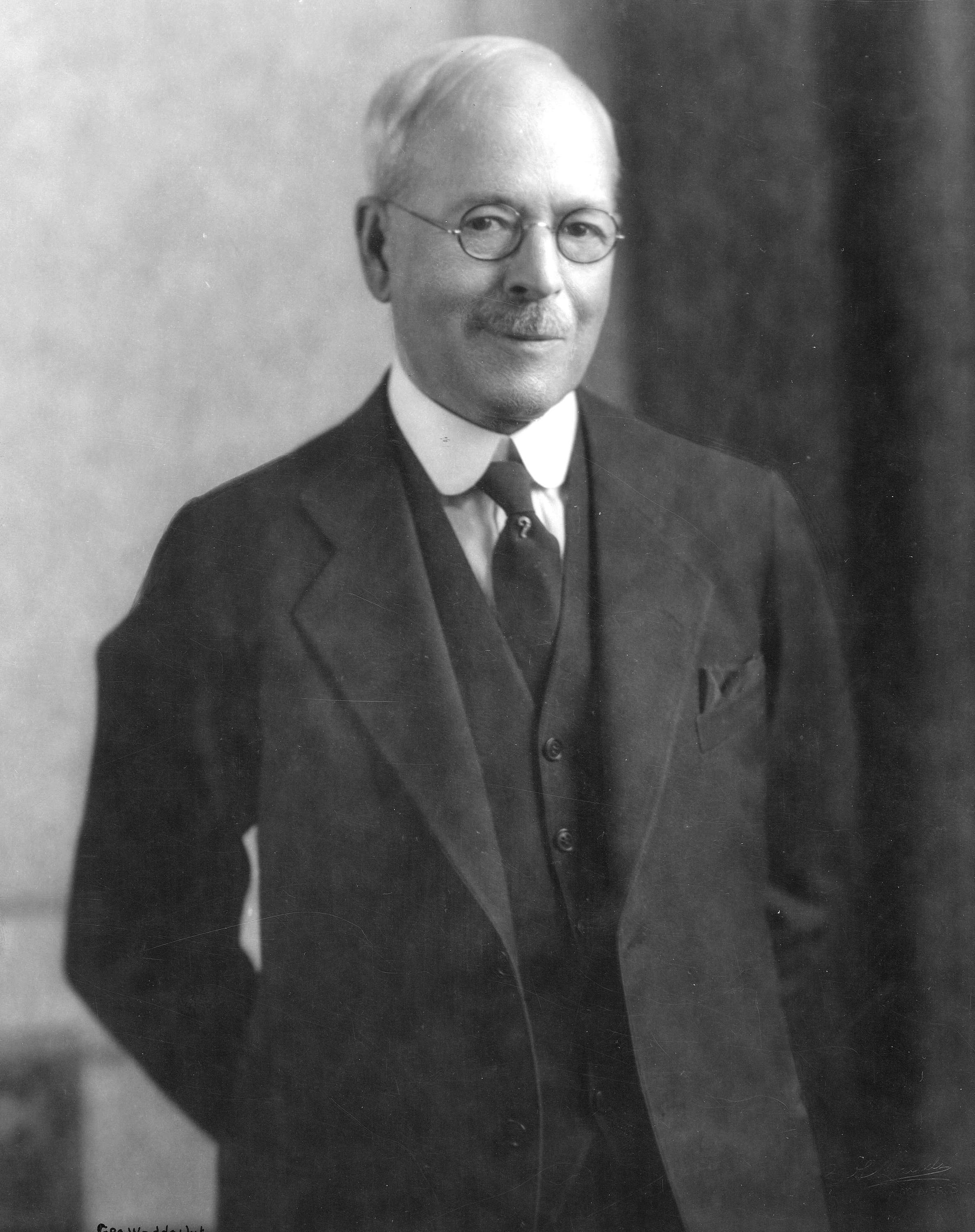
L. D. Taylor (1857–1946) was the longest-serving mayor, with 11 years between 1910 and 1934, whose political career was ultimately ended when his administration was proven corrupt.

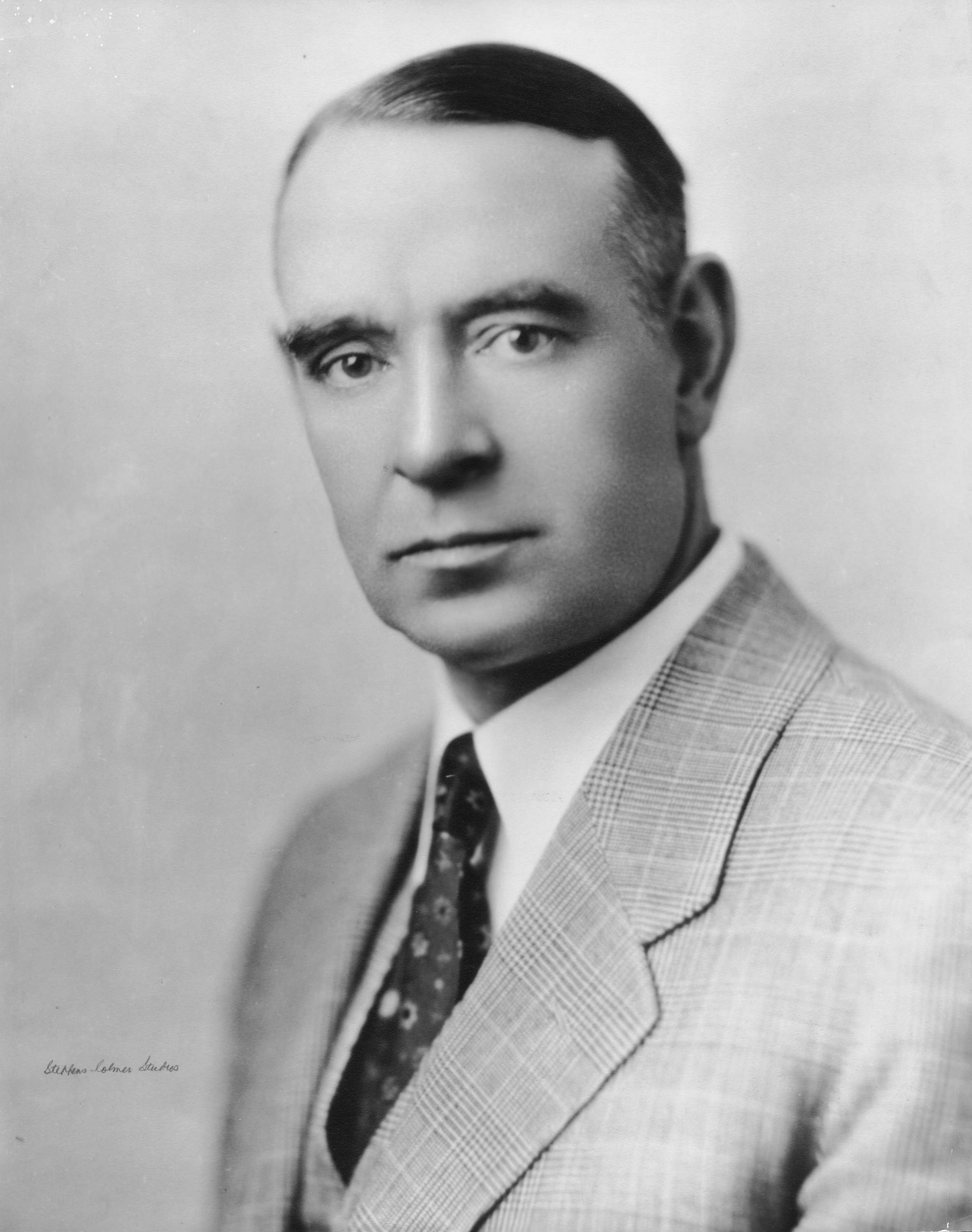
Gerry McGeer (1888–1947) broke Taylor's political ring and began several reforms.

† indicates the individual died in office.

#	Mayor	Term start	Term end	Terms	Party
1	Malcolm A. MacLean	1886	1887	2	Independent
2	David Oppenheimer	1888	1891	4	Independent
3	Frederick Cope	1892	1893	2	Independent
4	Robert A. Anderson	1894	1894	1	Independent
5	Henry Collins	1895	1896	2	Independent
6	William Templeton	1897	1897	1	Independent
7	James Garden	1898	1900	3	Independent
8	Thomas Townley	1901	1901	1	Independent
9	Thomas Neelands	1902	1903	2	Independent
10	William McGuigan	1904	1904	1	Independent
11	Frederick Buscombe	1905	1906	2	Independent
12	Alexander Bethune	1907	1908	2	Independent
13	Charles Douglas	1909	1909	1	Conservative
14	Louis D. Taylor	1910	1911	2	Liberal
15	James Findlay	1912	1912	1	Conservative
16	Truman S. Baxter	1913	1914	2	Liberal
(14)	Louis D. Taylor	1915	1915	1	Liberal
17	Malcolm P. McBeath	1915	1917	3	Liberal
18	Robert Gale	1918	1921	4	Conservative
19	Charles E. Tisdall	1922	1923	2	Conservative
20	William R. Owen	1924	1924	1	Conservative
(14)	Louis D. Taylor	1925	1928	4	Liberal
21	William H. Malkin	1929	1930	2	Conservative
(14)	Louis D. Taylor	1931	1934	4	Liberal
22	Gerry McGeer	1935	1936	2	Liberal
23	George C. Miller	1936	1938	2	NPA
24	James L. Telford	1938	1940	2	Independent
25	Jonathan W. Cornett	1940	1946	3	NPA
(22)	Gerry McGeer†	1947	1947	1/2	NPA
26	Charles E. Jones†	1947	1948	1/2	NPA
27	Charles E. Thompson	1948	1950	1	NPA
28	Frederick Hume	1950	1958	4	NPA
29	Albert T. Alsbury	1958	1962	2	CVA/NPA
30	William Rathie	1962	1966	2	NPA
31	Tom Campbell	1966	1972	3	Independent (Note: Tom Campbell was first elected as an independent but ran for the NPA in subsequent elections.)(1966–1968)
31	Tom Campbell	1966	1972	3	NPA (1968–1972)
32	Arthur Phillips	1972	1976	2	TEAM
33	Jack Volrich	1976	1980	2	TEAM (Note: Jack Volrich left TEAM during his first term and was elected as an independent in 1978.) (1976–1978)
33	Jack Volrich	1976	1980	2	Independent (1978–1980)
34	Mike Harcourt	1980	1986	3	Independent (1980–1984)
34	Mike Harcourt	1980	1986	3	Civic Independents (1984–1986)
35	Gordon Campbell	1986	1993	3	NPA
36	Philip Owen	1993	2002	3	NPA
37	Larry Campbell	2002	2005	1	COPE
38	Sam Sullivan	2005	2008	1	NPA
39	Gregor Robertson	2008	2018	3	Vision
40	Kennedy Stewart	2018	2022	1	Independent (2018–2022)
40	Kennedy Stewart	2018	2022	1	Forward Together (Note: Kennedy Stewart was elected as an independent in 2018 but formed a party for the 2022 election.) (2022)
41	Ken Sim	2022	2026	1	ABC Vancouver
42	Pete Fry	2026	Present	1	Green Party of Vancouver

== Mayors who held higher office ==
Two former mayors, Mike Harcourt and Gordon Campbell, went on to become premier of British Columbia.

George Clark Miller, Sam Sullivan, and James Garden were elected members of the Legislative Assembly of British Columbia (MLAs) after being mayor. Art Phillips was elected to the Parliament of Canada (MP) in 1979.

Larry Campbell was appointed to the Senate after being mayor.

Gregor Robertson, Charles Douglas, James Lyle Telford, Jonathan Webster Cornett and Charles Edward Tisdall were MLAs prior to becoming mayor. Kennedy Stewart was the New Democratic Party MP for Burnaby South before being elected.

Gerry McGeer was a BC MLA and provincial cabinet minister before becoming mayor of Vancouver and became a Canadian member of Parliament (MP) and senator after having been mayor
