= William McGuigan =

Canadian politician

William Joseph McGuigan
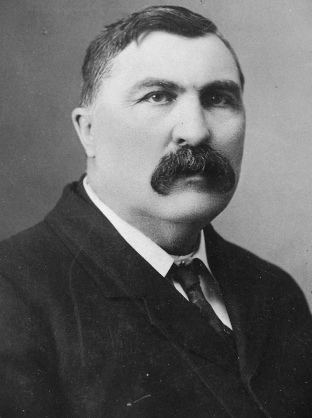

10th Mayor of Vancouver
- In office 1904
- Preceded by: Thomas Neelands
- Succeeded by: Frederick Buscombe

Personal details
- Born: July 18, 1853
- Died: December 25, 1908 (aged 55) Vancouver, British Columbia, Canada
- Resting place: Mountain View Cemetery
- Party: Independent

Dr. William Joseph McGuigan (July 18, 1853 – December 25, 1908) was the tenth Mayor of Vancouver, British Columbia and served one term in 1904. He was born in Stratford, Canada West and was buried in Mountain View Cemetery in Vancouver.
