= William Templeton (Canadian politician) =

Canadian politician

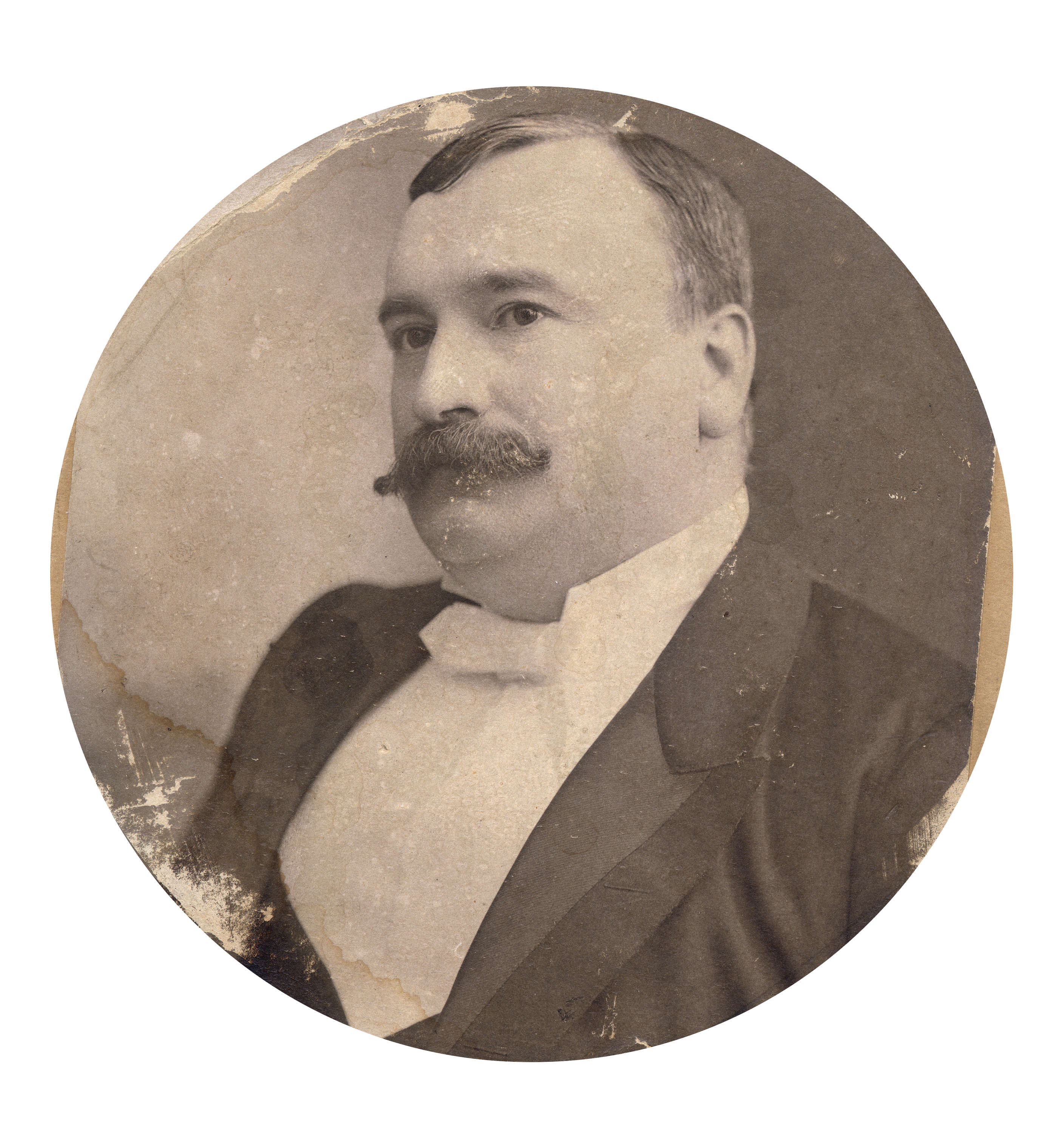

Mayor of Vancouver
- In office 1897
- Preceded by: Henry Collins
- Succeeded by: James Garden

Personal details
- Born: March 27, 1853 Belleville, Canada West
- Died: January 16, 1898 (aged 44) Vancouver, British Columbia
- Resting place: Mountain View Cemetery; 49°14′7.7″N 123°5′33.5″W
- Party: Independent
- Occupation: Grocer, butcher

William Templeton (March 27, 1853 – January 16, 1898) was the sixth Mayor of Vancouver, British Columbia, serving only one term in 1897.

A butcher and grocer, he operated a grocery store in the first brick building in Vancouver. Templeton also was a member of the Vancouver City Council and school board and had once run unsuccessfully for the mayor's seat before being elected in 1897. He was defeated in the next election in January 1898 and died shortly after. He is commemorated with a street and school named in his honour.

== Early life and business ==
Templeton was born in Belleville, Ontario, in 1853. He came to Vancouver in January 1886, when the settlement was named Granville. Later that year, he entered the grocery business, building a store on the corner of Hastings and Carrall Streets. After the building was destroyed in a fire, also the same year, Templeton and his partner Joseph Northcott commissioned a new brick building to be built on the corner lot that they had just purchased for $1800. It would be the first brick building in the city's history. He was also involved in railroad affairs, a member of a Canadian Pacific Railway group that benefitted from a land grant from the city in order to make it the terminus of the railway. On the occasion of the announcement in 1884, he ordered 1 tonne (2,200 lb) of turkeys to be shipped to Vancouver from Ontario to celebrate. In 1896, Templeton chartered the Vancouver, Victoria and Eastern Railway.

== Local government ==
In 1891, Templeton was elected to the Vancouver City Council as an alderman. He also served on the School Board as a trustee from 1892 to 1897. In 1890, Templeton ran unsuccessfully for the mayoralty of Vancouver, losing to David Oppenheimer. During the time leading up to the election, Templeton accused Oppenheimer of devoting "too much time [to] building castles in the sky" and not enough time to his official duties and to law enforcement. It was also said that Templeton was running to serve the "working and middle class", himself being a member of the working class, with Oppenheimer a higher class businessman. He is also said to have mocked Oppenheimer's German accent and to have lost supporters as a result. Templeton lost the election to Oppenheimer by 434 to 585 votes. This particular election has been said to have changed the politics of the city, initiating a divide in ideology and interests between the upper-class and middle-class citizens of the city.

He ran once again for mayor in 1897 and this time won by a majority of 319 votes, and served for the year. When in office, he advocated for a smelter to be built in the city, for the extension of voting hours to suit the workers, and for the removal of a requirement that civic election candidates own property in the city. Templeton was also noted for an aggressive personality. He was defeated for re-election by James Garden in the next election on January 13, 1898, by 1260 to 950 votes. The prominent issue of the election was the granting of licenses to music halls in the city, which Templeton opposed and Garden supported.

== Death and legacy ==
Templeton died suddenly during the afternoon of Sunday, January 16, 1898, three days after his defeat, at his home in Vancouver. He left a wife and children. At the time of his death, he was in the butchery business, as a pork packer. The cause of Templeton's death is unclear: some sources state that he committed suicide due to the distress of his defeat by overdosing on sleep medication, while newspaper reports at the time stated that he died from heart disease, a cerebral hemorrhage or apoplexy. He was buried at Mountain View Cemetery in Vancouver. A newspaper at the time reported:

Mayor Templeton's death was about a tragedy. At the last moment in the contest for a second term as chief magistrate of the city his friends seemed to have deserted him. After the fight was over and he went home a beaten man; he told of the shameful lies that had been circulated about him and remarked "These slanders cut into my heart like a knife." He gave instructions to his wife regarding his children and quietly went to sleep, a sleep from which he never awakened, although life remained in the body for thirty-six hours. Many say that Templeton died of a broke heart, but the doctor's verdict is "burst a blood vessel on the brain."

— The Rossland Times

The Templeton Building still stands today, at 1 East Hastings Street. Templeton Street and Templeton Secondary School in Vancouver are both also named after him.
