= Malcolm Alexander MacLean =

Canadian politician

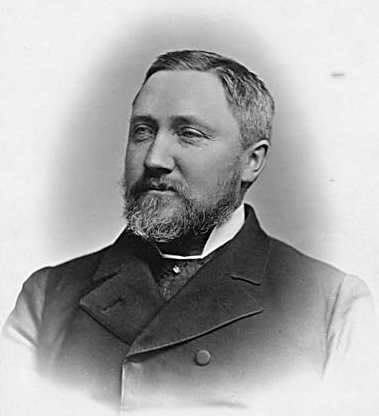

1st Mayor of Vancouver
- In office 1886–1887
- Succeeded by: David Oppenheimer

Personal details
- Born: August 14, 1844 Tiree, Scotland
- Died: April 4, 1895 (aged 50) Vancouver, British Columbia
- Party: Independent
- Spouse: Margaret Anne Cattanach
- Children: Three daughters and two sons
- Education: Eastman's National Business College
- Occupation: Schoolteacher, businessman, politician, Justice of the Peace, magistrate, immigration agent, and author

Malcolm Alexander MacLean (August 14, 1844 – April 4, 1895) was the first mayor of Vancouver, British Columbia, serving from 1886 to 1887.

== Early life ==
MacLean was born in 1844 to Allan and Jane McPhadden married 8 Mar 1820 [GROS Data OPR 551/1 -2] in Cornaigbeg Tiree, Scotland. Around 1848, the family relocated to Victoria County in Ops Township, Upper Canada, where MacLean was educated and later became a teacher. As he taught over three years, MacLean saved money with the goal of becoming a doctor; instead, after his brother's lumber company failed, his money ended up paying off business debts. MacLean then attended Eastman's National Business College in Poughkeepsie, New York, and after graduating worked in New York City for Cunard Steamship Company.

In the 1860s, MacLean returned to Canada, opening a general store in Oshawa, Ontario. He married Margaret Anne Cattanach on 5 January 1869, and the couple soon moved to Dundas, where MacLean ran another general store. His marriage into the Cattanach family quickly expanded MacLean's horizons; after his sister-in-law, Jessie and her husband Arthur Ross relocated to Winnipeg, MacLean followed suit in 1878.

There in Winnipeg, MacLean first began working as a commission-merchant, then soon joined Ross in the real estate business, amassing a fortune after the 1881–82 real estate boom. Unfortunately, a depression soon followed, causing MacLean to quit his business and move his family further west to a farm in the Qu'Appelle valley.

It is possible that MacLean served in the North-West Rebellion in 1885.

Later the same year, MacLean travelled to San Francisco. Originally en route to Honolulu with plans to enter Hawaii's sugar beet industry, he instead continued to Granville, today known as Vancouver. (Arthur Ross already was familiar with Granville, having recommended the town to serve as the western end of the Canadian Pacific Railway.) MacLean arrived in Granville at the start of 1886; within a month, MacLean found himself with a job running Ross' real estate office while Ross was away in Ottawa serving as an MP for Lisgar, and within half a year MacLean was operating his own real estate firm.

== Politics ==
In addition to his real estate business, MacLean began to pursue politics almost immediately after arriving in Granville. In February 1886, he worked to petition the provincial legislature to incorporate and rename the town, and as a result, on April 6, the city of Vancouver was formed.

=== Mayoralty ===
A mayoral election for the newly formed city was held on 3 May 1886. The race was extremely close: MacLean's opponent, Richard H. Alexander, was favored to win due to his support from the long-established elite, as Alexander had arrived in British Columbia during the colonial days. MacLean, though, pulled support largely from three groups: other newly arrived Manitobans and Ontarians (whom Alexander had dismissed as "North American Chinamen"); workers at Hastings sawmill involved in a labour dispute against Alexander, the mill's owner, who had pledged to hire Chinese workers to replace striking white workers; and the Knights of Labor, also driven by anti-Chinese sentiment. MacLean won the election with 242 votes against Alexander's 225—a difference of just seventeen votes—and on 25 May, MacLean was made Justice of the Peace.

Days later, supporters of Alexander (including later mayor David Oppenheimer) officially petitioned Victoria, claiming that at least 100 ballots had been cast illegally; fifty years later, backers of MacLean confirmed in interviews that many had voted illegally, including "houseboat tenants" and "itinerant hotel guests."

The voting scandal was quickly forgotten in the wake of the Great Vancouver Fire on 13 June 1886. Following the inferno, MacLean and his council members successfully convinced Governor General Henry Petty-Fitzmaurice, 5th Marquess of Lansdowne to give the military reserve in Burrard Inlet to the city, which became Stanley Park. In December 1886, MacLean was re-elected mayor, having run on a platform to extend the franchise and to restrict the property rights of the city's ethnic Chinese residents.

MacLean was greatly focused on the completion of the Canadian Pacific Railway, calling it "the placing of the keystone in the arch of confederation;" after three months of unofficial use, the first official train arrived in Vancouver on 23 May 1887. Later that year, the Vancouver Board of Trade was formed, and MacLean presided over its inaugural meeting. By 1888, MacLean claimed credit for improvements around Vancouver such as the clearing and grading of streets and the construction of vital infrastructure.

== Post-mayoralty ==
After his service as mayor, MacLean was appointed police magistrate of the city and continued in that position until 1890. In 1893, he was appointed a special commissioner of immigration in the United States by the Canadian government; while abroad he presented lectures on the opportunities presented in western Canada. In 1895, he was appointed stipendary magistrate for the district of Vancouver.

== Personal life ==
Due to his early white hair and personality, MacLean was sometimes known as "Squire MacLean." He was fluent in Scottish Gaelic and organised the St Andrew's and Caledonian Society of Vancouver in 1886. He was an avid promoter of British Columbia and Canada, penning articles praising them for the Scottish American and British periodicals.

== Death ==
MacLean died in 1895 at the age of 50. He was buried at Mountain View Cemetery in Vancouver, where several other past mayors are also at rest.

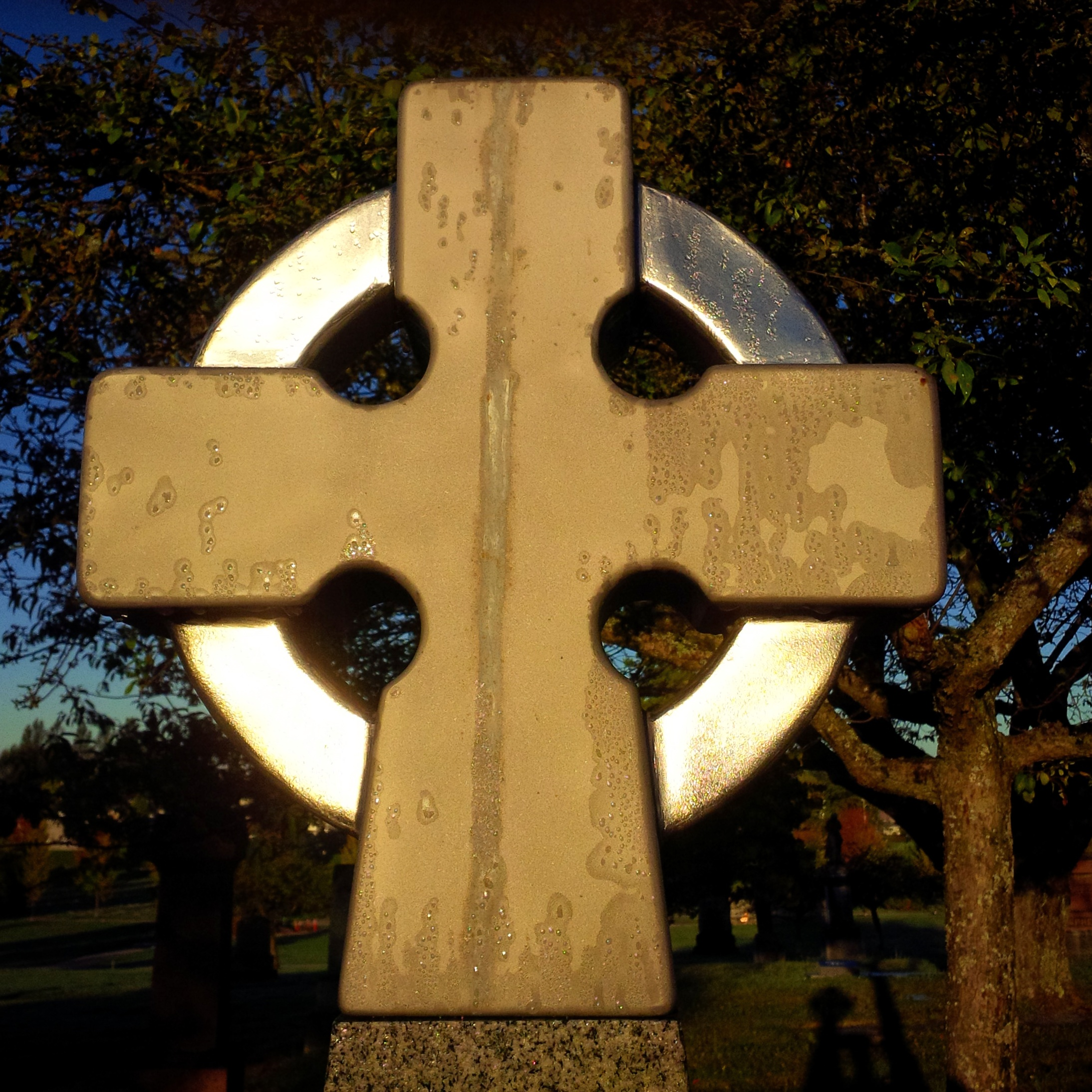
Photo of the metal fabricated replacement top for the gravestone of Malcolm Alexander MacLean
