= Frederick Cope =

Canadian politician

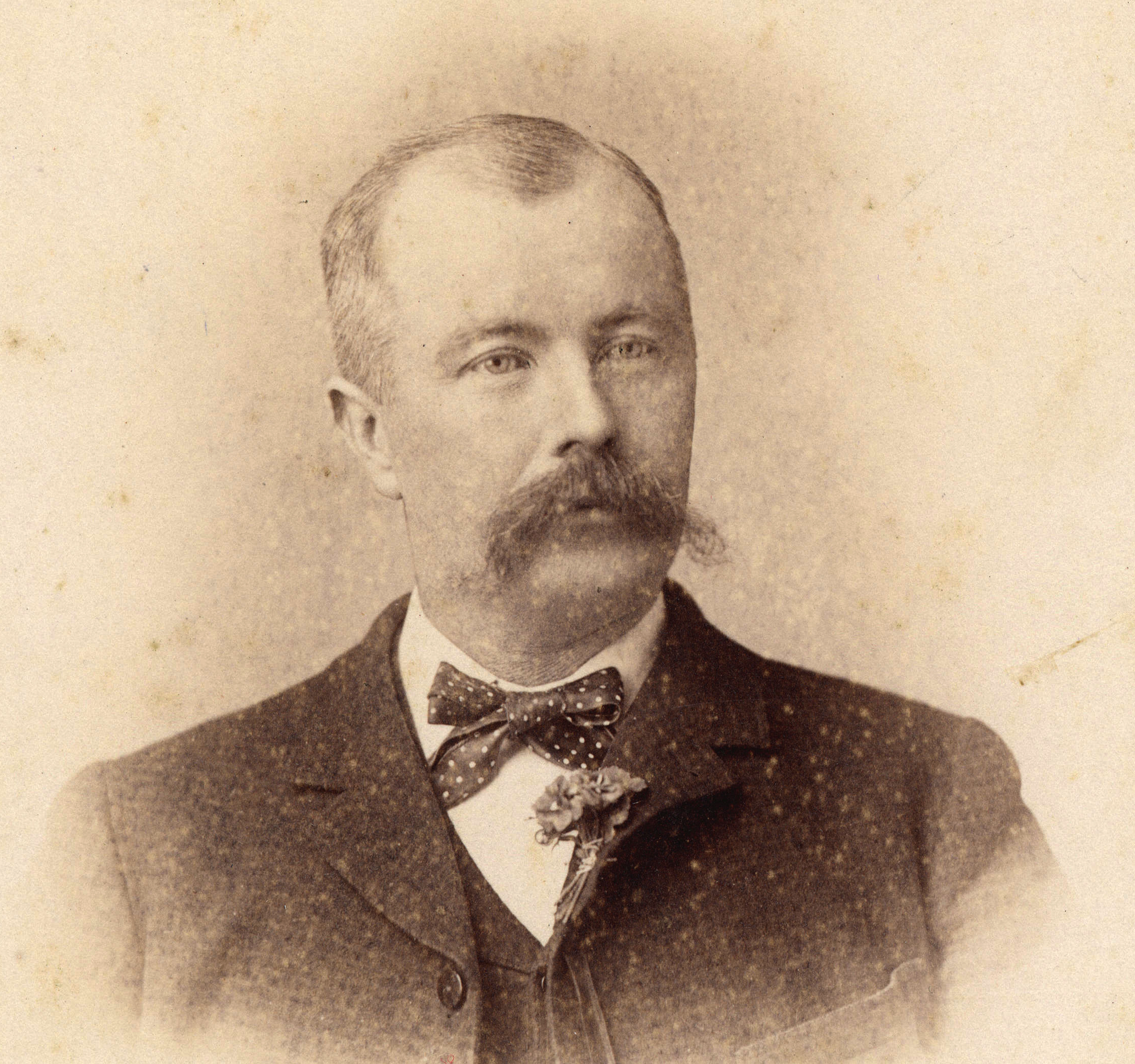

Mayor of Vancouver
- In office 1892–1893
- Preceded by: David Oppenheimer
- Succeeded by: Robert Anderson

Personal details
- Born: August 27, 1849 Simcoe, Canada West
- Died: September 19, 1897 (aged 48) Summit Lake, Yukon, Canada
- Resting place: Mountain View Cemetery; 49°14′7.7″N 123°5′33.5″W
- Occupation: businessman, merchant

Frederick Cope (August 27, 1849 – September 19, 1897) was the third Mayor of Vancouver, British Columbia, Canada, serving from 1892 to 1893.

Cope was born in Simcoe, Canada West in 1849. He was the second son of Frederick Manuel Cope & Eliza Catherine Myers. He was president of the British Columbia Building Association and operated a dry goods, millinery, tailoring and grocery business.

Cope defeated John Thomas Carroll in the 1892 mayoral election, one of the most hotly contested and closest in the city's history, winning with an 11-vote majority. He is the youngest elected mayor in the history of Vancouver, having been aged 42 at the time of his election. During the election, he garnered support of the city's business class, and the Vancouver World newspaper. His council however would consist of "reformers" of the working class, in opposition to Cope's representation of the business class. During his mayoralty, the city experienced an economic downturn; Cope responded by attempting to limit civic expenses, including the laying off of city employees, and initiating cutbacks. He also advocated for the Canada-Australia Steam Line, with the inaugural ship arriving in June 1893.

Cope was a Freemason. He drowned during the Klondike Gold Rush in 1897 in Shallow Lake, Yukon, when his horse fell while crossing the body of water. He tried unsuccessfully to rescue the horse and was pulled away by the undercurrents. His body was later transported back to Vancouver, and after sorting out a mixup of the remains, was buried at Mountain View Cemetery in Vancouver.
