= David Oppenheimer =

Canadian politician (1834–1897)

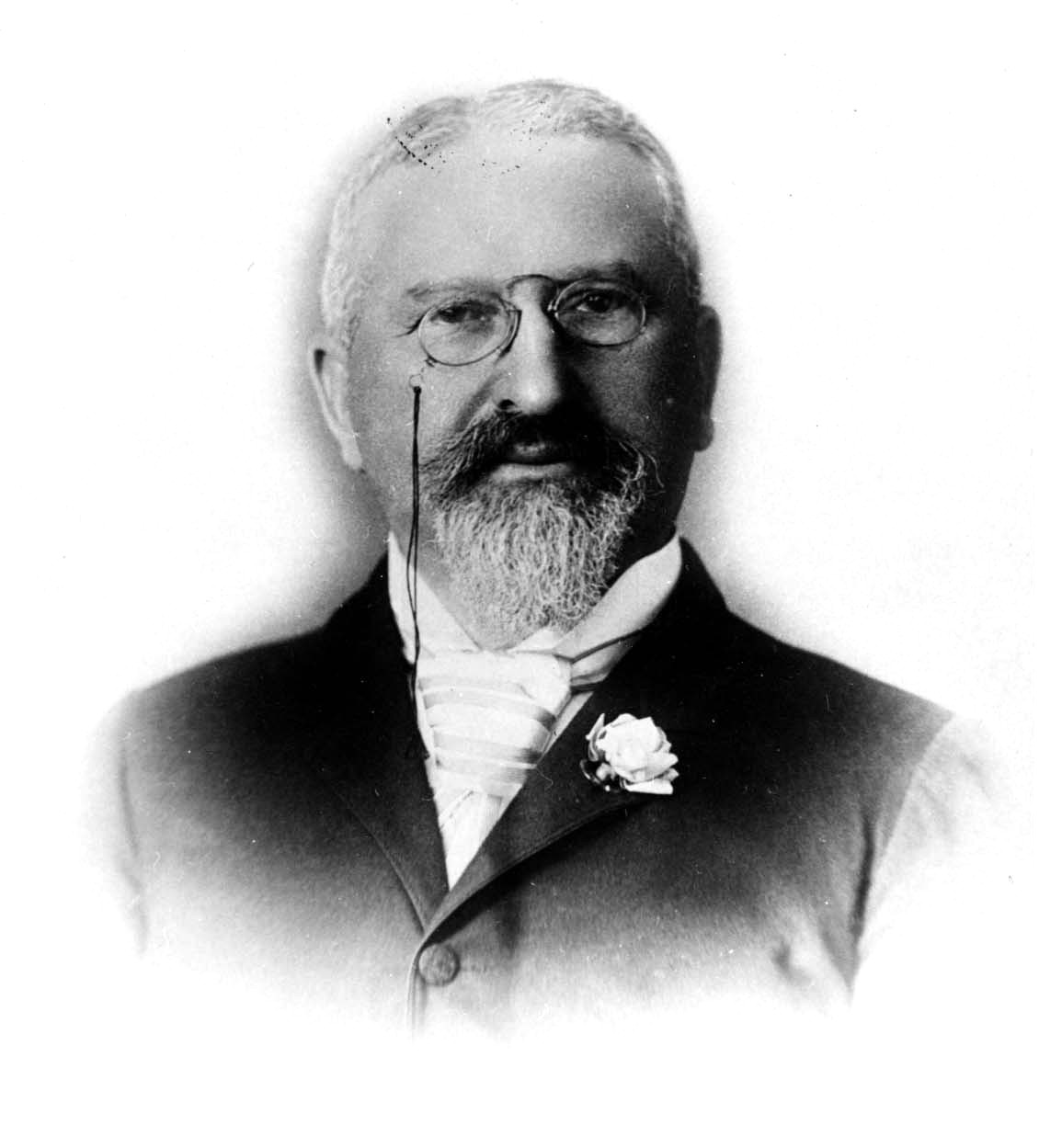

2nd Mayor of Vancouver
- In office 1888–1891
- Preceded by: Malcolm Alexander MacLean
- Succeeded by: Frederick Cope

Personal details
- Born: January 1, 1834 Blieskastel, Bavaria (today Saarland, Germany)
- Died: December 31, 1897 (aged 63) Vancouver, British Columbia, Canada
- Party: Independent
- Spouse(s): Christine "Sarah" (maiden name unknown) (m. 1857; died 1880) Julia Walters (m. 1883)
- Occupation: Businessman, investor, philanthropist, politician, writer

David Oppenheimer (January 1, 1834 – December 31, 1897) was a Canadian businessman, investor, philanthropist, politician, and writer. He was the second mayor of Vancouver, British Columbia, and a National Historic Person of Canada.

== Early life ==
Oppenheimer was born in Blieskastel, then in the Kingdom of Bavaria, as one of ten children. His father, Salomon, was a merchant and vintner. David's mother, Johanna (Johanette) Kahn, died when he was four years old. His family was Jewish. He was educated at the Collegiate School of Frankfurt am Main.

In 1848, after political upheaval and bad harvests, David Oppenheimer immigrated to New Orleans with his sister Caroline Oppenheimer Stern and four brothers: Charles (Carl), Meyer, Isaac and Godfrey (Gottfried). He studied bookkeeping and worked in a general store. Upon hearing of the California Gold Rush, the Oppenheimers became traders in Placer County, California, in 1851 and later Sacramento, California. David then worked in real estate and the restaurant business in Columbia, California. Here he married his first wife, Sarah (Christine), in 1857.

Following the decline of the California rush, the Oppenheimer brothers relocated to Victoria, British Columbia, in the late 1858 to establish the Charles Oppenheimer and Company supply business. As the Fraser River and Cariboo Gold rushes took off in 1858–1861 the Oppenheimers established stores catering to the prospectors and settlers in the Interior of the Colony of British Columbia at Yale, Hope, and Lytton in the Fraser Canyon, Barkerville in the Cariboo, and Fisherville at the Wild Horse Creek goldfield in the East Kootenay. They would later invest in real estate in Lytton and the Cariboo. With such a far-flung business, the Oppenheimers soon realized the importance of improving transportation and joined a group which successfully lobbied the colonial government in 1862 to build the Cariboo Road to Barkerville.

Despite business setbacks in 1866 and 1867, David was running the Oppenheimer Brothers warehouse in Yale by 1868 and was a partner in the firm by 1871. The wholesale provisioners company he started with his brothers in 1858 exists to this day as The Oppenheimer Group. David Oppenheimer was active in the Yale business community and entertained visiting dignitaries such as Governor-General Lord Dufferin. After over twenty years of marriage, with no children, David's wife Sarah died on October 15, 1880, and was buried in the Jewish Cemetery on Cedar Hill Road in Victoria, British Columbia. Fire destroyed much of Yale in 1881, including the Oppenheimers' store. Since the gold rush had declined and railway construction had moved on, David moved back to Victoria, British Columbia, and opened an import wholesale business with his brother Isaac in 1882. The following year David married his second wife, Julia Walters of New York, in San Francisco. Their daughter, Flora Jeanetta, was born in 1884 in Victoria.

== Vancouver businessman ==
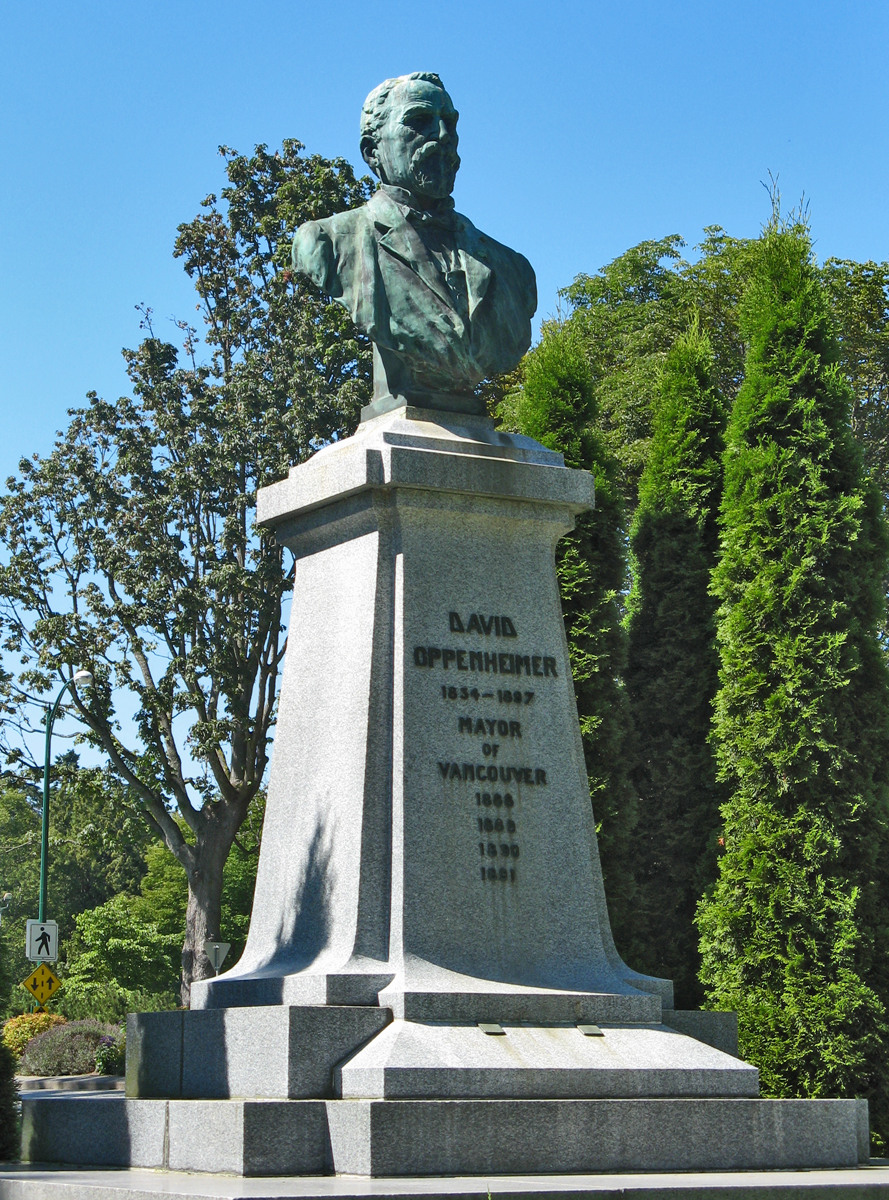
Bust of David Oppenheimer at the entrance to Stanley Park

David did extensive business with the Canadian Pacific Railway during its construction through the mountains of British Columbia in the 1880s, such as participating in a syndicate with Andrew Onderdonk to construct sections near Yale. Realizing the railway's importance, the Oppenheimer Brothers firm had joined the Vancouver Land and Improvement Company in 1878 to purchase land near its western terminus. David and Isaac Oppenheimer moved to Granville (now Vancouver) in 1885. They were both acclaimed as aldermen of city council in December 1886, and David became chairman of the city Finance Committee. In 1887, Oppenheimer Brothers opened the first wholesale grocery business in the fledgling city, which still exists as The Oppenheimer Group. After the Great Vancouver Fire, David helped found the Vancouver Board of Trade and was its first Chairman from 1887 to 1888.

== Mayor ==
In 1888, David Oppenheimer was acclaimed the second Mayor of Vancouver, British Columbia, serving until 1891. During his four one-year terms as mayor, many city services were established: the fire department, a ferry across Burrard Inlet, the streetcar system and a water connection from the Capilano River. David advocated city control of utilities and financed these projects by selling city bonds in London. He also lobbied for more parkland, playgrounds, completion of a city hospital and a Jewish section in the city's Mountain View Cemetery. Stanley Park was opened in 1888 while David Oppenheimer was Vancouver's mayor. David focused on transportation improvement again by helping to establish the British Columbia Electric Railway plus encouraging steamboat links to Australia and the northern British Columbia Coast. He promoted the British Columbia mining industry by publishing a pamphlet in England and the United States, as well as sending product samples to eastern Canada. David also attracted investment from Europe and industries such as the B.C. Sugar Refinery and the Vancouver City Foundry. David did not collect a salary for mayoral duties and entertained official guests at his own expense. However, opponents like William Templeton criticized the overlap between his business and civic ventures.

As a philanthropist, David Oppenheimer donated land to the city for parks and helped found charities such as the Alexandra Orphanage and the Vancouver branch of the YMCA. After fire destroyed Barkerville in 1868, Oppenheimer donated a fire engine to the local fire brigade. The Oppenheimer family also offered land to the Vancouver Jewish community for a synagogue, the Congregation B'nai Yehuda, which was located at Pender and Heatley Streets in the Strathcona neighbourhood, then the focus of the city's Jewish community (soon after renamed Congregation Schara Tzedeck and since relocated to Oak Street).

After four mayoral terms, David Oppenheimer decided not to run again because of poor health in 1891. He died on December 31, 1897, of heart failure at the age of 63 (just one day before his 64th birthday). David was buried next to his second wife, Julia, in the Salem Fields Cemetery of Brooklyn, New York.

Though his material wealth had declined in the Long Depression, Oppenheimer was rich in recognition of his civic contributions. Even the Vancouver Daily News-Advertiser (today's Vancouver Sun), which had been critical of his political career, praised David Oppenheimer as "the best friend Vancouver ever had."

== Legacy ==
His monument at the entrance of Stanley Park, in Vancouver, was built with public donations and dedicated on December 14, 1911. After nomination by the Jewish Historical Society of British Columbia, the Historic Sites and Monuments Board of Canada approved the designation of David Oppenheimer as a National Historic Person on April 11, 2008.

On July 12, 2008, Vancouver's Mayor Sam Sullivan proclaimed "David Oppenheimer Day" in the city of Vancouver, to honour this innovative founding father who built much of the city's infrastructure. At a ceremony in Stanley Park, Mayor Oppenheimer's life was remembered during speeches by city officials, local historians, members of his family, and John Anderson, CEO of The Oppenheimer Group.

== See also ==
- Oppenheimer Park in Vancouver, British Columbia, was created and named after David Oppenheimer.
- David Oppenheimer Elementary School in Vancouver, British Columbia, was also named after him.
- Economic History of Vancouver
