= Neelands =

Neelands may refer to:

- Robert Henry Neelands (1881–1974), Canadian politician
- Thomas Neelands (1862–1944), Canadian mayor of Vancouver

== See also ==
- William Neelands Chant (1895–1976), Canadian politician
