= Donald Rix =

Donald Blake Rix
- Born: 1931; Orillia, Ontario
- Died: November 6, 2009 (aged 77–78); Vancouver, British Columbia
- Education: University of Western Ontario
- Known for: Philanthropy
- Medical career
- Profession: Pathologist
- Awards: Order of Canada; Order of British Columbia

Donald Blake Rix, CM OBC (1931 – November 6, 2009) was a Canadian pathologist, philanthropist, community volunteer, and businessman. He was the founder and chair of MDS Metro Laboratory Services (now known as LifeLabs Medical Laboratory Services), the largest private medical laboratory in Western Canada.

He was a member of several organizations and foundations including the BC Innovation Council, BC Cancer Agency Foundation, BC Medical Services Foundation, and the BC Children's Hospital Foundation and was the chairman of the Board of Governors of UNBC.

Dr. Rix earned a specialty certificate in general pathology in 1968 from the University of Western Ontario. He was a fellow of the College of American Pathologists, the Royal College of Physicians and Surgeons of Canada, the Royal Society of Medicine, and the American Society of Clinical Pathologists. He was awarded honorary doctorates by the British Columbia Institute of Technology (BCIT) and the University of Western Ontario, Simon Fraser University, University of British Columbia, and University of Victoria. He was the former chair of the Vancouver Board of Trade, a senior member of both the British Columbia and Canadian Medical Associations, and was awarded the BCMA Silver Medal of Service Award in 2004. On August 19, 2009, Dr. Rix was awarded the Canadian Medical Association's 2009 F.N.G. Starr Award.

Donald Rix died of cancer on November 6, 2009, and in 2014, it was revealed that he was the first patient in the world to have received personalized onco-genomics on a research basis as part of his cancer treatment.
