= Templeton Secondary School =

Coordinates: 49.2780°N 123.0608°W

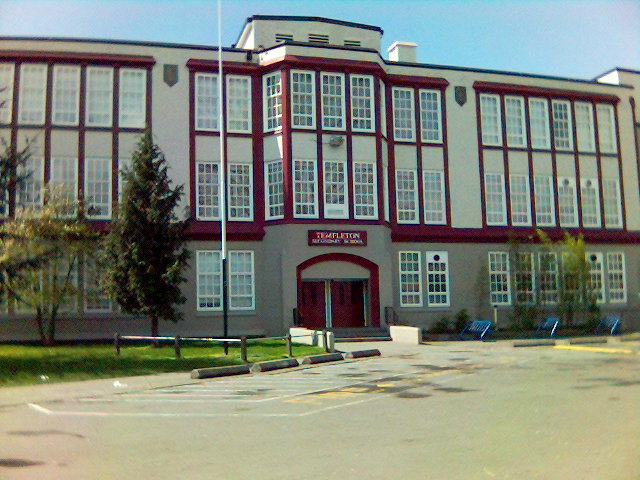
- Templeton Secondary front entrance on Templeton Drive

Location
- 727 Templeton Drive; Vancouver, British Columbia, V5L 4N8; Canada

Information
- School type: Secondary School
- Motto: "Pro Bono Omnium" (For the Good of All)
- Founded: 1927
- School board: School District 39 Vancouver
- Superintendent: Helen McGregor
- Area trustee: Suzie Mah
- School number: 03939010
- Director: Rick Lopez (Director of Instruction)
- Principal: Adam Tuerlings
- Grades: 8-12
- Enrollment: 801 (2017)
- Capacity: 1400
- Language: English
- Colours: Maroon and Gold
- Team name: Titans
- Website: templeton.vsb.bc.ca

Templeton Secondary School is a public secondary school located in the Grandview-Woodland neighbourhood on the East Vancouver, British Columbia, Canada. Its student teams won the SmartAsk competition in 2004, the junior Reach For The Top provincial championships in 2015 and finished 3rd at the senior provincial Reach For The Top championships in 2017. The team ranked 6th at the 2017 National tournament. It has also won many awards for drama productions and for student films. Templeton is known for its successful theatre and film programs—named "Theatre Temp" and "Dream Big Productions" respectively—both founded by Jim Crescenzo and each regarded as among the best in British Columbia. It has a well-regarded STEM program.

== Students ==
As of 2026, Templeton has approximately 1000 students. The student population is a multicultural student body with approximately two-thirds of the students reporting a language other than English as their first language. Over forty languages and dialects are spoken. Of all secondary schools in Vancouver, Templeton has the highest percentage of students born in Canada according to 2010 school district data. Approximately one third of the students report that Chinese is the language spoken at home. First Nations students comprise six percent of the school population. Templeton students span the spectrum of academic abilities, from gifted learners to those with learning difficulties. There is a program for students with moderate to severe intellectual disabilities and/or autism called Life Skills.

== History ==
Templeton Junior High opened in the fall of 1927, with H. B. Fitch as the first principal. The name of the school is from William Templeton, a former mayor of Vancouver.

The school's motto, "Pro Bono Omnium", which translates as "For The Good Of All", was chosen in 1927 by Mr. Fitch, the staff, and the students. In 1956, Grade 10 students were added, and in 1963, Grade 11 students were added. In 1964, the first Grade 12 students entered Templeton and it became Templeton Secondary School. In the early 1960s, a science and home economics wing was added, along with a new gymnasium. By 1970, a new library was built. In 1975, the Templeton Park pool was completed, along with playing fields, a track, tennis courts and sand pits.

== Academics ==
- Students are part of a project based STEM program, integrating science, technology, engineering, and mathematics and learning through real-world applications. STEM students gain hands-on experience with woodworking, drafting, mechanics, electronics, computer science and robotics.
- Templeton is home to a Mini-School Program for children who want to take part, from grades 8-12. The objective of the Mini School is to foster interdisciplinary learning and environmental stewardship through activities and field trips that bring the students together for a more closer relationship with each other. All of the Mini-School students who can afford it go to Strathcona Park in the fall, Bamfield Marine Science Centre in grade 9, Victoria in grade 10, and Ashland, Oregon in grade 11.
- Templeton Secondary also offers courses in home economics, typing, sewing, auto mechanics, electronics, woodworking, tourism, literature, photography, art, music, choir, drama and film, and television.
- ACE-IT program
- Secondary School Apprenticeship program
- The Culinary Arts program is no longer in operation.

== Indigenous cultural enhancement ==
Templeton has a stated goal of building knowledge, acceptance, empathy, and appreciation of Indigenous peoples' histories. The school has a Sacred Room, a welcoming and comfortable space for all students that celebrates Indigenous traditions and cultures.

== In the news ==
- On May 29, 2009, a Templeton secondary student was arrested after making a hit list of 117 staff and students. The student was charged with weapons offences after police seized a shotgun, ammunition, a machete, a combat knife, a sword, and two collapsible metal batons.
- On Thursday, May 12, 2016, Templeton Secondary was evacuated after less than 5 mL of butyric acid was spilled in a chemistry lab. There was no risk to students' safety.
- In 2018, Templeton Secondary senior student Nick Murray won a Silver Medal in the Canada Wide Science Fair with his project titled "Low-Cost, Point-of-Care Skin Cancer Detection".
- In November, 2019, Nicole Porciello, a student support worker at Templeton Secondary, was murdered by her ex-partner in an act of violence against women.

== In popular culture ==
Bryan Adams performed in the auditorium for a lunch hour concert as a lead singer for Sweeney Todd in 1978.

Many Hollywood producers and directors have commented that Templeton Secondary School has been one of the best schools in which they have filmed, stating that the students are very respectful to the actors and crew during filming. At times, students are allowed to watch the filming as long as they are quiet on the set. Templeton has been used as a set for a number of productions and presently continues to act as one.

- Templeton Secondary is best known as the interior set for the fictional Smallville High in the television drama series Smallville, as well as Beachwood High School in the TV series Kyle XY; Beachwood High and Smallville High murals still remain in the school's hallway. The hallway commonly known to the students as the "Smallville Hallway" is where most filming takes place for television and movies.
- The TV shows Aliens in America, 21 Jump Street, and Bionic Woman were filmed at Templeton Secondary School.
- Scenes for the movie Personal Effects starring actors Ashton Kutcher and Michelle Pfeiffer were filmed in the gym and parking lot of the school in November 2007. The movie was released on May 12, 2009.
- Scenes from the movie What Goes Up starring actors Hilary Duff and Josh Peck were filmed at the school in December 2007. The movie was released on May 29, 2009.
- The Nickelodeon original movie Gym Teacher: The Movie starring Nathan Kress, Avan Jogia, Brenna O'Brien, and Christopher Meloni was filmed at the school in January 2008. It premiered on September 12, 2008.
- The Nickelodeon original movie Spectacular! starring Victoria Justice, Avan Jogia, Jean-Luc Bilodeau, Tammin Sursok, and Andrea Lewis was filmed at the school in May 2008. It premiered on February 16, 2009.
- The television movie Scooby-Doo! The Mystery Begins was filmed at the school in the summer of 2008. It was released on September 13, 2009, on Cartoon Network.
- The popular television series Supernatural was filmed at the school in November 2008 and February 2009.
- The pilot of The Vampire Diaries was filmed at Templeton.
- A few scenes from This Boy's Life, starring Leonardo DiCaprio and Robert De Niro, were filmed at Templeton.
- Exterior scenes in Nickelodeon's 2010 television film The Boy Who Cried Werewolf were filmed at Templeton.
- Exterior and hallway scenes depicting the fictional Chance Harbor High School in the 2011 television series The Secret Circle were filmed at Templeton.
- Hallway, classroom and auditorium scenes in Diary of a Wimpy Kid and Diary of a Wimpy Kid: Rodrick Rules were filmed at Templeton.
- High school scenes in the 2014 film If I Stay, starring Chloë Grace Moretz and Mireille Enos, were filmed at Templeton.
- High school interior scenes in the television series iZombie were filmed at Templeton.
- Scenes from the miniseries When We Rise, written by Academy Award winner Dustin Lance Black were filmed at Templeton.
- High school scenes in the 2017 film Power Rangers were filmed at Templeton.
- Riverdale, based on the Archie Comics, portrays Templeton as the fictional Southside High.
- The 2018 reboot of the Predator franchise had technical scenes filmed inside and outside of the school.

== Notable alumni ==
- Layla Alizada, actress
- Francesco Aquilini, businessman, investor and philanthropist
- Barry Beck, hockey player and former New York Rangers captain
- Linda Chung, actor, singer, winner of Miss Chinese Vancouver 2003 and Miss Chinese International 2004
- Wayde Compton, author
- John Ferguson, Sr., former Montreal Canadiens player and father of former Toronto Maple Leafs general manager John Ferguson, Jr.
- Paloma Kwiatkowski, actor
- Chanelle Peloso, actor
- Evelyn Lau, author
- Bobby Lenarduzzi, soccer player, president of Vancouver Whitecaps and member of the National Soccer Hall of Fame
- Domenic Mobilio, soccer player
- DinDin, South Korean rapper and MC
- Manuel Sobral, Canadian Olympian boxer at the 1988 Seoul Summer Olympics
- Mimi Hines, actress, singer, comedian
