= Thomas Townley =

Canadian politician

Thomas Owen Townley
- Born: August 18, 1862. Newmarket Ontario.
- Died: March 19, 1935.
- Education: Trinity College, Toronto
- Occupation: Lawyer.
- Title: 8th Mayor of Vancouver, British Columbia.
- Parent(s): John and Alice(Dixon) Townley.

Thomas Owen Townley (August 18, 1862 – March 19, 1935) was a Canadian lawyer and the eighth Mayor of Vancouver, British Columbia, serving one term in 1901.

Born in Newmarket, Canada West, the son of John and Alice (Dixon) Townley, both of whom were natives of Lancashire, England, Townley was educated in the public schools of Newmarket and received a Bachelor of Arts degree in 1882 from the Trinity College, Toronto. He later studied law in Winnipeg and was called to the bar of Manitoba in 1886. He moved to Vancouver and started a law practice. From 1889 to 1910, he was registrar of land titles for the District of New Westminster. In 1901, he was elected mayor of Vancouver and served for one term. From 1886 to 1896, he served in the militia, retiring with the rank of lieutenant colonel.
