= Alexander Bethune (politician) =

Canadian politician

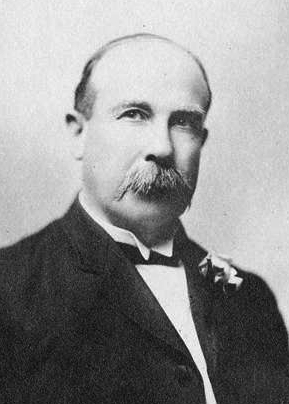

Mayor of Vancouver
- In office 1907–1908
- Preceded by: Frederick Buscombe
- Succeeded by: Charles Douglas

Personal details
- Born: January 31, 1852 Peterborough, Ontario
- Died: June 10, 1947 (aged 95) Los Angeles County, California
- Spouse: Catherine MacIntosh
- Occupation: Businessman, merchant

Alexander Bethune (January 31, 1852 – June 10, 1947), merchant, was the 12th Mayor of Vancouver, British Columbia, serving from 1907 to 1908. He had previously served seven years as alderman.

== Early and family life ==
Bethune was born in Peterborough, Ontario to William B. and Catherine (née Dingwall) Bethune.

He married Catherine MacIntosh of Paisley, Ontario in 1878, and they had two daughters. A Presbyterian church, Bethune enjoyed hunting, fishing and motoring as hobbies. He was also a Freemason and founding member of Acacia Lodge No. 22.

== Career ==
After completing his education in Ontario, he moved to Manitou, Manitoba in 1887 where he entered the hardware business. He also served as postmaster of Manitou as well as on the city council as an alderman. He moved further west in 1890, to Vancouver. In Vancouver he would establish a shoe store, Mills & Bethune, operating from 1896 to 1900, when he entered the building business.

Bethune was elected to Vancouver City Council in 1900 and served until 1907, when he was elected mayor. He was also the head of the Electoral Union slate. During the election, which was at the time overshadowed by the ongoing provincial election, the main issue of contention was whether to have a stop in the city along the Vancouver Westminster and Yukon Railway.

During his term, he was faced with the September 1907 Vancouver riots in which he permitted demonstrators from the Asiatic Exclusion League to hold a rally at city hall in which speeches were delivered in support of the prohibition of Asian immigration to the city. Bethune was also a founder, paying member and ardent supporter of the organization. After the city hall rally, the crowd descended upon Vancouver's Chinatown and Japantown, continuing protests, smashing windows and even beating residents. Bethune would later express regret about the riot and urged citizens to use moderation. Bethune was also against the immigration of Indians, prohibiting them from settling in Vancouver during his term in 1907.

== Death and legacy ==
He died in 1947 at Los Angeles County, California, but his remains were returned to Vancouver, for interment at Mountain View Cemetery.
