= Frederick Buscombe =

Canadian politician (1862–1938)

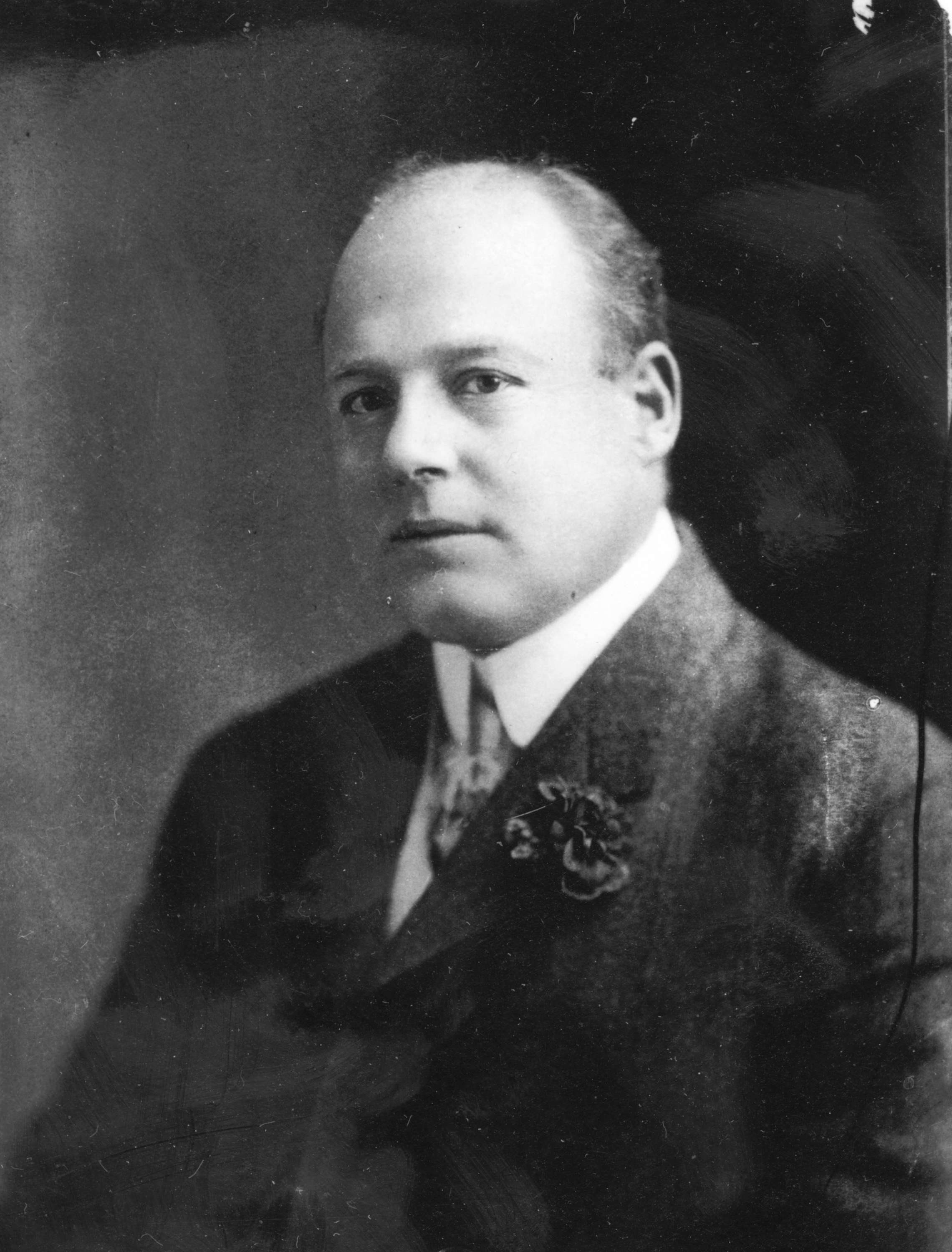

Mayor of Vancouver
- In office 1905–1906
- Preceded by: William McGuigan
- Succeeded by: Alexander Bethune

Personal details
- Born: September 2, 1862 Bodmin, Cornwall, UK
- Died: July 21, 1938 (aged 75) Vancouver, British Columbia, Canada
- Resting place: Mountain View Cemetery; 49°14′7.7″N 123°5′33.5″W
- Spouse(s): Lydia Rebecca Mattice; Cora Elsie Bird
- Occupation: Businessman

Frederick Buscombe (September 2, 1862 – July 21, 1938), was the 11th Mayor of Vancouver, British Columbia, Canada. He served from 1905 to 1906. A glassware and china merchant, he was a President of the Vancouver Board of Trade in 1900.

Buscombe was born in 1862 in Bodmin, Cornwall, England, to Edwin and Isabella Oliver Grilles Buscombe. He immigrated to Canada with his family in 1870, settling near Hamilton, Ontario, where his father became a builder. He first worked in Hamilton from 1878 to James A. Skinner & Company, a glassware and china company, as a travelling salesman from 1878 to 1891. In 1891, his job with the company brought him west to Vancouver, where he established an office with his brother, George. Prior to 1891, he visited the Vancouver area twice, in 1884 and 1886. He served as a partner of the company in Vancouver until 1899, when he bought out the company, and established Frederick Buscombe & Co. Ltd. china, glassware and earthenware with his brother, which grew to be one of the largest businesses of the kind in the Canadian West. He was also president of the Pacific Coast Lumber & Sawmills Company, and director of the Pacific Marine Insurance Company. In 1899, he commissioned the Buscombe Building, located at 342 Water Street & 403 West Cordova Street, in Gastown, Vancouver, which is now the site of a restaurant and various businesses.

Buscombe was elected Mayor of Vancouver in 1905. During the election, he advocated for improved financial management within the municipal affairs, earning support from three newspapers, and many businessmen. He served two terms, until 1906. During his mayoralty, he helped develop the Greater Vancouver Water Board. The city council also passed a motion to request suspension of immigration of East Indians to Vancouver due to public discontent of immigrants working in the growing construction trade.

Buscombe served as president of Vancouver's Board of Trade from 1900 to 1901, and as president of the Vancouver Tourist Association in 1901. A Mason, he was also a member of the Vancouver Club, Royal Vancouver Yacht Club, Terminal City Club, Jericho Country Club, and the Sons of England Society. He died at Vancouver 1938 and was buried at Mountain View Cemetery. At the time of his death, he was married to Cora Elsie Bird.

He married Lydia Rebecca Mattice on May 6, 1886, with whom he had five children. He lived in Dundurn, Vancouver. A member of the Church of England, he enjoyed yachting, fishing and golf.

== Bibliography ==
- Gosnell, R.E. (1906), A history o British Columbia, Victoria, British Columbia: Lewis Publishing Co., OL 14012318M
