= Arthur S. Hara =

Japanese-Canadian businessman and philanthropist

Arthur Shigeru Hara, OC OBC is a prominent Japanese-Canadian businessman and philanthropist, renowned for his work in promoting Canada's relations with Pacific Rim nations (especially Japan).

He was born in Vancouver to Japanese parents. He attended Laura Secord Elementary School and part-way through Britannia Secondary School before taken to Japan during the war as his parents repatriated. Upon return to Canada in 1956, he was employed with the Japanese consulate for six years, then joined Mitsubishi Canada Ltd in 1962 and became the company's first Canadian chairman of the board in 1983.

He was chairman of the Board of Governors of the University of British Columbia and served as Chairman of the Vancouver Board of Trade between 1985 and 1986. He was a member of the board of the Canadian Unity Council and director of Canada West Foundation.

Between 1988 and 1994, he was chairman of the Asia Pacific Foundation of Canada and was a member of the Vancouver Summit Society which prepared the ground for APEC's controversial 1997 summit in Vancouver.

== Honours ==
He was inducted as a Member of the Order of Canada in 1985 and in 1992 he was promoted to Officer of the Order of Canada. He has also been awarded the Canada Confederation Medal, Queen Elizabeth II Golden Jubilee Medal, Order of the Rising Sun, and Honorary Doctor of Laws in 1990. In 2013, he was made a member of the Order of British Columbia in recognition for being an "Asia-Pacific businessman and economic leader".
