= Ben Flores =

Benson Flores
- Born: c.1848 Philippines
- Died: 1929; Vancouver
- Other names: Ben
- Occupations: fisherman, trapper

Benson Flores, sometimes called Ben Flores (c. 1848 – April 11, 1929), was one of the early Filipino Canadians to settle in Bowen Island, B.C. He was the first known Filipino to migrate to Canada on record.

The exact location of Benson Flores' birth is not known although it is believed he was from the Philippines together with other fishermen who ferried locals around the area and fished to make a living in Snug Cove.

According to the Bowen Island Museum and Archives, Flores operated the first boat rental in Snug Cove. He was referred to as "Old Ben."

Flores suffered from bladder and kidney disease. At age 81, he died on April 11, 1929, in Vancouver General Hospital. He was buried in an unmarked grave in Horne 2 Mountain View Cemetery.

== Erroneous identification ==
In 2024, Flores was honoured in Vancouver. A memorial plaque was unveiled and media outlets reported on the unveiling of a memorial marker dedicated to him. However, it inscribed an erroneous claim of his name as Benjamin, which was not confirmed by official sources. The new inscription was received through a GoFundMe campaign by local groups.

== See also ==
- Filipino Canadians
