= Bust of David Oppenheimer =

Sculpture in Vancouver, British Columbia, Canada

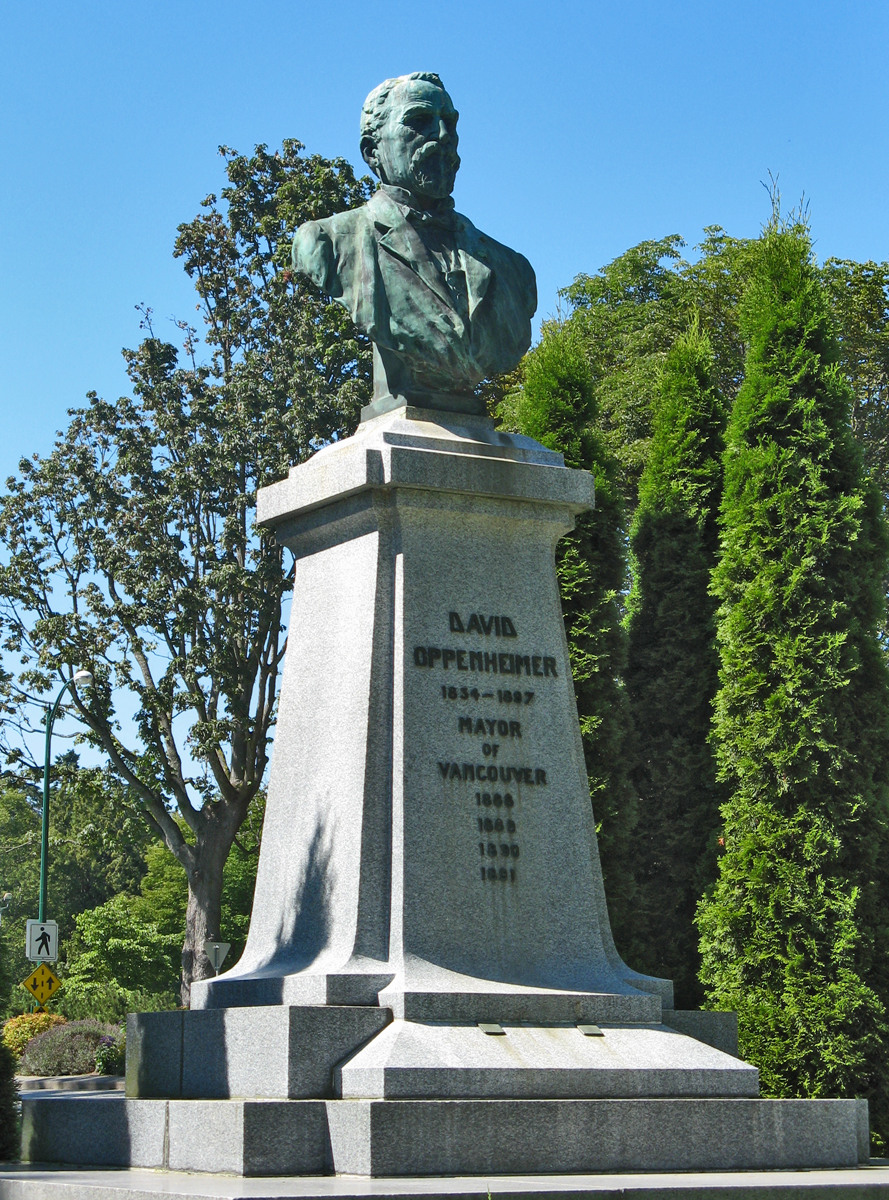
- The bust as pictured in 2007
- Artist: Charles Marega
- Subject: David Oppenheimer
- Location: Vancouver, British Columbia; 49°17′26″N 123°08′46″W
- Owner: City of Vancouver

The bust of David Oppenheimer, mayor of Vancouver from 1888 to 1891, is installed in Vancouver's Stanley Park, in British Columbia, Canada.

The bronze sculpture was created by Canadian sculpture Charles Marega and installed in 1911.
