= Greater Vancouver Board of Trade =

Canadian non-profit

Coordinates: 49.288635°N 123.111119°W

The Greater Vancouver Board of Trade
- Founded: 1887
- Type: Advocacy group
- Purpose: Business advocacy
- Location: World Trade Centre Vancouver, BC Canada
- Region served: Vancouver, British Columbia, Canada
- Method: Media attention, direct-appeal campaigns, political lobbying
- Key people: Brigitte Anderson (CEO)
- Website: The Greater Vancouver Board of Trade

The Greater Vancouver Board of Trade (GVBOT) is a non-profit organization. It serves Vancouver, British Columbia, Canada, in a fashion similar to the Board of Trade or Chamber of Commerce. The Board is the largest business association between Victoria and Toronto, participating in activities such as engaging in advocacy to impact public policy at all levels of government, facilitating networking opportunities, and providing professional development resources for its members.

== Role in Local Governance ==
The Greater Vancouver Board of Trade has been vested by federal and provincial governments with the power to select board members for a number of local governance bodies and institutions. The Board of Trade selects one of the five members of the Screening Panel that shortlists candidates for TransLink's Board of Directors and is also involved in selecting directors for Port Metro Vancouver and the Vancouver Airport Authority.

== History ==
In 1983, the Board became a member of the World Trade Centers Association and in 1986 moved into the Vancouver World Trade Centre office complex at Canada Place. It hosted the General Assembly of the World Trade Centers Association the same year.

In 1990 the Board launched its Federal Debt Clock, a 1,500 lb (680 kg), 15 ft (4.6 m) by 10 ft (3.0 m) computerized calculator that tracked the rise in government debt. At the time, Canada's $363 billion debt was climbing at a rate of $53,300 per minute. In 1998, Finance Minister Paul Martin hit the gong and stopped the clock at a special Board of Trade luncheon. The board's debt clock stopped just shy of $600 billion.

== Milestones ==
Year	Milestone
1887	Businessmen agreed to form a Board of Trade to rebuild Vancouver after the Great Fire of 1886.
1888	City mayor David Oppenheimer becomes president of The Vancouver Board of Trade. The organization sends a list of objectives to the provincial secretary, demanding facilities and services for Vancouver.
1902	An undersea cable was laid from Vancouver to Sydney after The Board of Trade lobbied for a communications link between Western Canada and Australia. Campaigns continued for a steamer service from Seattle to Alaska via Vancouver and a railway into the Kootenays.
1914	Membership rose to 1,000. The Board persuaded the federal government to dredge the First Narrows for shipping, lobbied for a new city hall and post office, and helped establish Daylight Saving Time.
1926	Established a Faculty of Commerce at the University of British Columbia.
1926	Grew to 10 "bureaus" and 10 standing committees to lobby all levels of government. Campaigned on freight rates, for the Trans-Canada Highway and for a large city airport.
1935	T.S. Dixon, then Board of Trade president, worked with the BC Medical Association and chaired the first meeting to found a cancer institute – the British Columbia Cancer Foundation.
1960s	Predicted conventions and tourism would be a major industry in North America, campaigned for a metro transit authority and monitored regional transportation.
1983	Joined the World Trade Centers Association, linking to 300 trade centres across the globe.
1986	Moved into the World Trade Centre and hosted the General Assembly of the World Trade Centers Association. Proposed establishing Canada's first local airport authority.
1990	Wendy McDonald, CM, OBC launched the federal debt clock and became the first woman chair. Led a mission to Ottawa and Washington, DC, to lobby for fast border lanes resulting in B.C.'s PACE lanes followed by CANPASS.
1992	The Board and Volunteer Vancouver co-founded the Leadership Vancouver Society. Thanks to The Board, the federal cabinet approved the YVR Airport Authority.
1998	Then finance minister Paul Martin stopped The Board's Debt Clock with a balanced budget.
1999	Introduced the Leaders of Tomorrow Mentorship Program.
2001	Launched Spirit of Vancouver® to revitalize community spirit and save the fireworks.
2002	An Olympic Countdown Clock was lowered by helicopter in Canada Place to support the bid for the 2010 Winter Games.
2003	Released a Report on Property Crime in Vancouver and hosted workshops and forums promoting the 2010 Winter Olympics bid, which was won.
2004	Hosted the inaugural meeting of the Greater Vancouver Chambers Roundtable, for all surrounding chambers of commerce to introduce plan for the Olympic Games. The Board formed a coalition and successfully demanded a re-vote by the 2005 TransLink board to save the Richmond-Airport-Vancouver (RAV) rapid transit line, originally voted down.
2005	Construction started on the saved Richmond Airport-Vancouver (RAV) line. The Board hosted the inaugural B.C. Economic Forum and the 2,100-delegate Hong Kong-Guangdong Business Forum in Canada.
2006	As a founding member of the Fair Tax Coalition, The Board played a lead role in achieving a one-per-cent reduction in business property taxes, bringing the total tax reduction to 10.2 per cent. The Board released its landmark report, Reforming the Canadian Health Care System and launched the Company of Young Professionals (CYP) program.
2007	Won the best new membership recruitment category in the World Chambers Competition 2007 at the 5th World Chambers Congress in Istanbul, Turkey. Work with the Vancouver Fair Tax Coalition froze business property taxes at 2006 levels.
2008	City of Vancouver councillors approved a one-per-cent shift per year in property taxes for the next five years; initiated the Con Air program to return of out-of-province criminals; the provincial government eliminated capital tax on financial institutions and the Women's Leadership Circle® program was launched.
2009	An anti-crime mission met leading politicians in Ottawa and Statistics Canada recognized police-reported crime alone should not define "the national crime rate." The Metro Roundtable for municipalities was founded. The Board welcomed the first Canada Line train to Waterfront station and was officially thanked for saving it. The Rix Center for Corporate Citizenship & Engaged Leadership was founded by Chair Dr. Don Rix, CM, OBC and presented its inaugural engaged citizenship awards. The Board struck the Health, Wellness and Well-Being Task Force and hosted a Health Care Forum for 150 leaders.
2010	Another one-per-cent shift per year in Vancouver property tax reductions for businesses equated to an estimated $43 million savings per year for business. The Board released a follow-up Kids 'N Crime Economic Report and launched its redesigned website.
2011	The Board released reform recommendations in its report, The Joint Pursuit of Value and participated in an economic impact study on the Hornby St. separated bike lane to improve future consultation processes. The Board also joined the Smart Tax Alliance in support of retaining the Harmonized Sales Tax (HST), and launched its first Aboriginal Opportunities Forum. In August, The Board of Trade announced the appointment of Iain Black as its new president and CEO.
2012	The Board released a landmark report entitled Psychologically Healthy Workplaces: Improving Bottom Line Results and Employee Psychological Well-Being at the Canadian Mental Health Association's Bottom Line Conference. The Board also hosted the second annual Aboriginal Opportunities Forum, an expert panel on the U.S. economy, and a luncheon event with Virgin Founder Sir Richard Branson, which drew more than 1,400 to the Vancouver Convention Centre. Chair Wendy Lisogar-Cocchia led an urban economic mission to London, England and Milan, Italy. Following a comprehensive multi-year review process, a refreshed set of bylaws were passed at The Board's 125th AGM, reflecting best practices in association governance. In addition, incoming chair Ken Martin announced the formation of a new policy council, which will support more policy initiatives and reinstate a strong voice for Vancouver's business community.
2016	On 3 March, the organization has adopted a new logo and name – the Greater Vancouver Board of Trade.
2018	The Board hosted A Moderated Conversation with Former U.S. First Lady Michelle Obama, an event where Michelle Obama was the key speaker.
2019	Brigitte Anderson assumed the role of CEO and President of the organization, becoming first female CEO of the Greater Vancouver Board of Trade.
2020	The Board announced the Advisory Committee of the Diversity and Inclusion Leadership Council (DLC) which is an evolution of the Women's Leadership Council (WLC) and launched the Scale-Up Centre for SMEs.

== Programs ==
The Greater Vancouver Board of Trade runs a variety of programs, including many symposiums, exclusive networking events and community fundraisers, in addition to programs like The Spirit of Vancouver, Leaders of Tomorrow and the Company of Young Professionals.

=== Leaders of Tomorrow ===
Leaders of Tomorrow (LOT) is a mentorship program, created by the Greater Vancouver Board of Trade. The program selects 100 students in their final year from accredited Lower Mainland post-secondary educational institutions.

=== Company of Young Professionals ===
The Company of Young Professionals (CYP) is a leadership development program designed for young professionals under the age of 32. Members can attend Board of Trade events at discounted rates and can be involved in the program for up to three years.

=== Diversity and Inclusion Leadership Council ===
The Diversity and Inclusion Leadership Council (DLC), an evolution of the Women’s Leadership Council program, is an inclusive program that champions and advocates for leadership that best reflects the diversity of the Greater Vancouver region.

== Miscellaneous facts ==
- Over 80% of the Members of the Greater Vancouver Board of Trade are small business owners.
- The Greater Vancouver Board of Trade has over 5,000 members.
- The Greater Vancouver Board of Trade publishes a monthly newspaper, Sounding Board, which reports on policy issues and membership news, and has an estimated total readership of 30,000.

== Current chair ==
The current chair of the Board of Directors is Brent Cameron, Managing Partner and Chair of the Board, Boyden Canada.

== Chairs ==
Chair	Period
David Oppenheimer	1887–88
Ebenezer Vining Bodwell	1889
Richard Henry Alexander	1889–90
John Hendry	1891
G. E. Berteaux and William Ferriman Salsbury	1892
J. C. Keith	1893
G. R. Major	1894
Henry Ogle Bell-Irving	1895–96
William Godfrey	1897–98
Charles Edward Tisdall, MLA (Mayor)	1899
Frederick Buscombe (Mayor)	1900
F. F. Burns	1901
William Harold Malkin (Mayor)	1902
H. T. Lockyer	1903
H. McDowell	1904
A. B. Erskine	1905 & 1912
R. P. McLennan	1906
W. J. McMillan	1907
E. H. Heaps	1908
H. A. Stone	1909
Ewing Buchan	1910
A. G. McCandless	1911
Hon. Francis Lovett Carter-Cotton	1913
Jonathan Rogers	1914–15
Nicol Thompson	1916
B. W. Greer	1917
P. G. Shallcross	1918
Chris Spencer	1919
W. J. Blake Wilson	1920
P. D. Malkin	1921
R. Kerr Houlgate	1922
J. B. Thomson	1923
J. K. Macrea, QC	1924
Melville Dollar	1925
F. E. Burke	1926
Robert McKee	1927
T. S. Dixon	1928 & 1935
Hon. William Culham Woodward	1929
R. D. Williams	1930
Mayne D. Hamilton	1931
Harold Brown	1932
H. R. MacMillan	1933
George Kidd	1934
J. Y. McCarter	1936
Walter M. Carson	1937
John Whittle	1938
G. Lyall Fraser	1939
H. R. Cottingham	1940
C. E. Anstie	1941
B. O. Moxon	1942
Hon. S. S. McKeen	1943
T. C. Clarke	1944
Charles A. Cotterell	1945
W. J. Borrie	1946
Thos. Braidwood	1947
H. T. Mitchell	1948
T. G. Norris, QC	1949
Col. W. G. Swan	1950
Ralph D. Baker	1951
Hon. H. H. Stevens	1952
Ralph C. Pybus	1953
G. W. G. McConachie	1954
Howard N. Walters	1955
W. H. Raikes	1956
Brenton S. Brown	1957
David Kinnear	1958
A. H. Cater	1959
R. G. Miller	1960
E. L. Harrison	1961
D. T. Braidwood	1962
W. M. Anderson, CA	1963
Edward Benson	1964
Ralph T. Cunningham	1965
Sydney W. Welsh	1966
William G. Leithead	1967
J. N. Hyland	1968
G. R. Dawson	1969
Edward Disher	1970
Hon. W. M. Hamilton	1971
J. L. Dampier	1972
Alan F. Campney	1973
Hon. Henry Pybus Bell-Irving, OC, DSO, OBE, OBC, ED, CD	1974
D. G. McGill	1975
C. L. Goddard	1976
D. R. Fraser	1977
D. C. Selman	1978
A. H. Hart, QC	1979–80
W. R. Wyman	1980–81
M. E. Nesmith	1982–83
A. M. Fowlis	1984–85
Arthur S. Hara, OC	1985–86
G. P. Clarke	1986–87
R. E. Kadlec	1987–88
P. H. Hebb	1988–89
L. I. Bell, OBC	1989–90
W. B. McDonald, CM	1990–91
R. T. Stewart	1991–92
David G. McLean, OBC	1992–93
Iain J. Harris	1993–94
George F. Gaffney	1994
Jill Bodkin	1994–95
Wayne A. Nygren	1995–96
Brandt C. Louie	1996–97
Robert A. Fairweather	1997–98
A. Allan Skidmore	1998–99
T. Richard Turner	1999–2000
Harri Jansson	2000–01
Carole Taylor, OC	2001–02
Peter Legge	2002–03
Jeff Dowle	2003–04
Graeme A.G. Stamp	2004–05
Dan Muzyka	2005–06
Frank Borowicz, Q.C.	2006–07
Henry K.S. Lee	2007–08
D. B. Rix, CM, OBC	2008–09
Sue Paish, Q.C.	2009–10
Jason McLean	2010–11
Wendy Lisogar-Cocchia, O.B.C.	2011–12
Ken Martin	2012–13
Elio Luongo	2013–14
Janet Austin, O.B.C.	2014–15
Tim Manning, O.B.C.	2015–16
Robin Silvester, ICD.D	2016–17
Anne Giardini, O.C., Q.C.	2017–18
Lori Mathison	2018–19
Kari Yuers	2019–20
Brent Cameron	2020–21

== See also ==
- Mission Regional Chamber of Commerce
