= Henry Collins (politician) =

Canadian politician and merchant

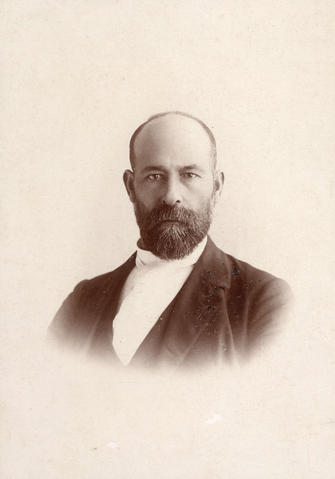

Mayor of Vancouver
- In office 1895-1896
- Preceded by: Robert A. Anderson
- Succeeded by: William Templeton

Personal details
- Born: C. 1844 [Uncertain], Canada West
- Died: 1904
- Resting place: Kincardine Cemetery
- Party: Independent
- Occupation: Merchant

Henry Collins (c. 1844–1904), merchant, was the fifth Mayor of Vancouver, British Columbia, Canada. He served from 1895 to 1896.
