= Thomas Neelands =

Canadian mayor (1862-1944)

Thomas Fletcher Neelands (8 March 1862 – 2 December 1944) was the ninth Mayor of Vancouver, British Columbia, serving from 1902 to 1903.

== Biography ==
Thomas Fletcher Neelands was born in 1862 in Carleton County, Ontario. He had a brother (George A. Neelands) and a sister.

He moved to Vancouver in 1886 after the city was founded.

=== Career ===
Neelands served as alderman for four years. He was elected Mayor of Vancouver in 1902 and 1903, serving two terms.

=== Personal life ===
Neelands died on 2 December 1944 at the age of 83. His funeral was held four days later and he was buried in the Independent Order of Odd Fellows plot at Mountain View Cemetery.
