= Robert McBeath =

Recipient of the Victoria Cross

Robert Gordon McBeath
- Born: 22 December 1898; Kinlochbervie, Scotland
- Died: 9 October 1922 (aged 23); Vancouver, British Columbia, Canada
- Military career
- Allegiance: United Kingdom
- Branch: British Army
- Service years: 1915 - 1918
- Rank: Lance corporal
- Units: The Seaforth Highlanders
- Conflicts: First World War
- Awards: Victoria Cross
- Other work: Canadian police officer

Robert Gordon McBeath, VC (22 December 1898 – 9 October 1922) was a Scottish recipient of the Victoria Cross, the highest and most prestigious medal that can be awarded to members of British military forces. Following the end of the First World War McBeath married and emigrated to Canada where he was killed in the line of duty while working as a police officer in Vancouver, British Columbia.

== First World War ==
McBeath was a 19 years old lance-corporal in the 1/5th Battalion, The Seaforth Highlanders (Ross-shire Buffs, Duke of Albany's) of the British Army during the First World War when the following deed took place for which he was awarded the VC.

On 20 November 1917 during the Battle of Cambrai in France, Lance-Corporal McBeath volunteered to deal with a nest of machine-gunners that checked the advance of his unit and which had caused heavy casualties . He moved off alone, armed with a Lewis gun and a revolver. Finding that several other machine-guns were in action, McBeath attacked them with the assistance of a tank and drove the gunners to ground in a deep dug-out. McBeath rushed in after them, shot the first man who opposed him and then drove the remainder of the garrison out of the dug-out. He captured three officers and 30 men. "

McBeath's award was published in the London Gazette on 11 January 1918, which reads:

For most conspicuous bravery company in attack and approaching the final objective, a nest of enemy machine-guns in the western outskirts of a village opened fire both on his own unit and on the unit to the right. The advance was checked and heavy casualties resulted.

When a Lewis gun was called for to deal with these machine-guns, L/Corpl. McBeath volunteered for the duty, and immediately moved off alone with a Lewis gun and his revolver. He located one of the machine-guns in action, and worked his way towards it, shooting the gunner with his revolver at 20 yards range. Finding several of the hostile machine-guns in action, he, with the assistance of a tank, attacked them and drove the gunners to ground in a deep dugout.

L/Corpl. McBeath, regardless of all danger, rushed in after them, shot an enemy who opposed him on the steps, and drove the remainder of the garrison out of the dug-out, capturing three officers and 30 men.

There were in all five machine-guns mounted round the dug-out, and by putting them out of action he cleared the way for the advance of both units. The conduct of L/Corpl. McBeath throughout three days of severe fighting was beyond praise.

== Freemasonry ==
He was Initiated into Freemasonry in Lodge St. Mary's Caledonian Operative, No.339, (Inverness, Scotland) on 12 July 1919. He did not take all his Masonic degrees in Scotland. After his arrival in Canada, he completed his degrees in Mount Hermon Lodge, No. 7 (Vancouver, Canada) in which he was Passed on 29 October 1921 and Raised on 18 May 1922.

== Canada ==
After the war, McBeath and his wife moved to Canada, where he joined the British Columbia Provincial Police. On August 12, 1921, he joined the Vancouver Police Department. On October 9, 1922, while walking the beat on Granville and Davie Streets with his partner, Detective R. Quirk, McBeath stopped and arrested a man named Fred Deal for impaired driving. While escorting the prisoner to the nearest call-box, the man pulled a handgun from his pocket and shot both officers; McBeath's partner survived, but McBeath died almost instantly. He was 23 years old.

Fred Deal was arrested later that day and was subsequently sentenced to death. On appeal, he was found guilty of manslaughter and had his sentence reduced to life in prison after received a new trial since he had been beaten in custody. Deal said he had been beaten and called racial slurs. Sergeant Tuning, who admitted to punching him four times in the head, received, received a month-long suspension without pay. Deal served 21 years before being released and deported to his native Jacksonville, Florida, where he died a few years later.

== Funeral ==
Robert McBeath was given what was called at the time “the largest official funeral in Vancouver history.”

== Posthumously ==
A Vancouver Police Marine vessel is named the R.C. McBeath VC in honour of Robert McBeath, as is a housing development, McBeath Court, in his home town of Kinlochbervie.

McBeath is buried in the Masonic Section, Plot 193, Lot 6, of Mountain View Cemetery in Vancouver. The headstone shows his name as "MacBeath", although his surname is spelled "McBeath" on all other documents except the Vancouver coroner's report.

The Vancouver Police Department hold a ceremony at his graveside every November 11 at 0900 hrs., where names and branches of service of VPD members, who took their leave, then served in the Canadian Armed Forces, and were KIA overseas are read out.

McBeath's Victoria Cross is displayed at the Regimental Museum of Queen's Own Highlanders, Fort George, Highland, near Inverness in Scotland.

== Sources ==
- Monuments to Courage (David Harvey, 1999)
- The Register of the Victoria Cross (This England, 1997)
- Scotland's Forgotten Valour (Graham Ross, 1995)
- War Diary of the 5th Seaforth Highlanders (Major. D. Sutherland, M.C., T.D., 1920)
- Joe Swan, A Century of Service: The Vancouver Police 1886-1986. Vancouver: Vancouver Police Historical Society and Centennial Museum, 1986, 51.
- Gliddon, Gerald (2004). VCs of the First World War: Cambrai 1917. Sutton Publishing. ISBN 978-0-75-247668-1.
