= Malcolm McBeath =

Canadian politician

Malcolm Peter McBeath (2 December 1880 – 15 June 1957) was the 17th mayor of Vancouver, British Columbia, Canada, from 1915 to 1917.

Born in Allenford, Bruce County, Ontario, the son of Thomas and Lena (Foisie) McBeath, McBeath moved with his family to Portage la Prairie, Manitoba, in 1892. In 1894, he apprenticed to be a printer. In 1905, he moved to Winnipeg where he entered the real estate business. In 1907, he moved to Vancouver and was also active in real estate.

McBeath was a city alderman from 1912 until he campaigned for the mayor's position. He defeated Thomas Kirkpatrick in a campaign dominated by morality issues.
