= Mountain View Cemetery (Vancouver) =

Cemetery in Vancouver, British Columbia, Canada

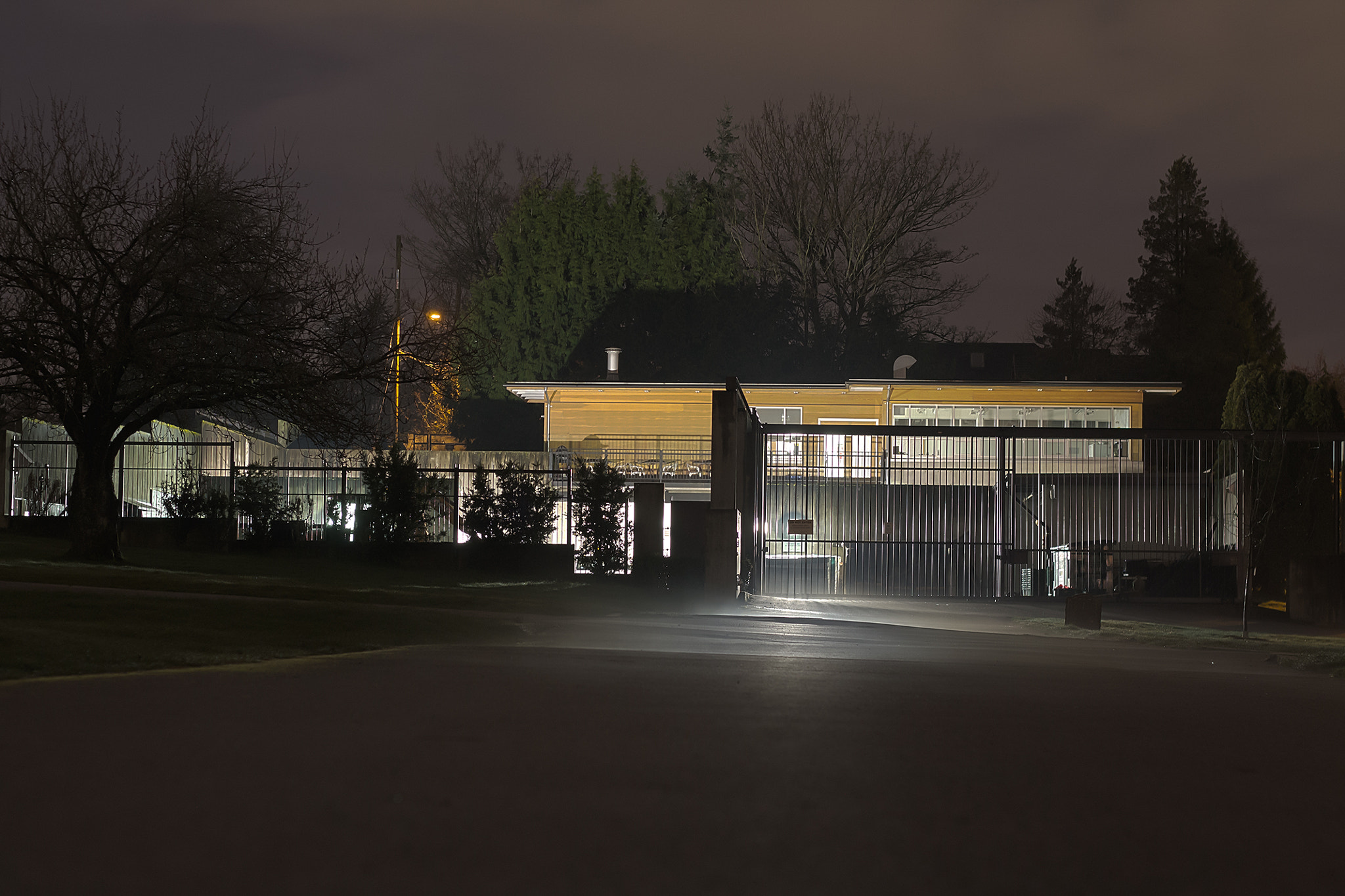
- Mountain View Cemetery's landscape operations building
- Interactive map of Mountain View Cemetery

Details
- Established: 1886
- Location: 5455 Fraser Street, Riley Park–Little Mountain, Vancouver, British Columbia
- Country: Canada
- Coordinates: 49°14′7.7″N 123°5′33.5″W
- Type: Non-denominational
- Owned by: City of Vancouver
- Size: 0.43 square kilometres (110 acres)
- No. of graves: 92,000
- No. of interments: 145,000
- Website: Official website
- Find a Grave: Mountain View Cemetery

Mountain View Cemetery is the only cemetery in the City of Vancouver, British Columbia. Opened in 1886, it is located west of Fraser Street between 31st and 43rd Avenues. It is owned and operated by the City of Vancouver and occupies 0.43 square kilometres (110 acres) of land, containing more than 100,000 grave sites and over 150,000 interred remains. The first interment took place on February 26, 1887. The first interment was supposed to happen in January 1887 but poor weather, a new road, and a broken wagon wheel resulted in the intended first occupant being temporarily buried outside the cemetery. His body was relocated to inside the cemetery months later.

== History ==
Only one existing cemetery in the vicinity, Fraser Cemetery in New Westminster (established in 1870), is older than Mountain View. Mountain View Cemetery opened in 1886, the same year that the city of Vancouver was incorporated; it supplanted older burial grounds in an area that was designated the city's first park, now called Stanley Park. Mountain View's original parcel of land (now known as the "Old Section") is bounded by Fraser Street on the east, 37th Avenue on the south, 33rd on the north, and by three remaining trees from what was once a row of tall Lawson Cypress trees on the west. Land to the north of this was purchased in 1901 for an expansion and became the "Horne I Addition" – named after the developer who sold the land.

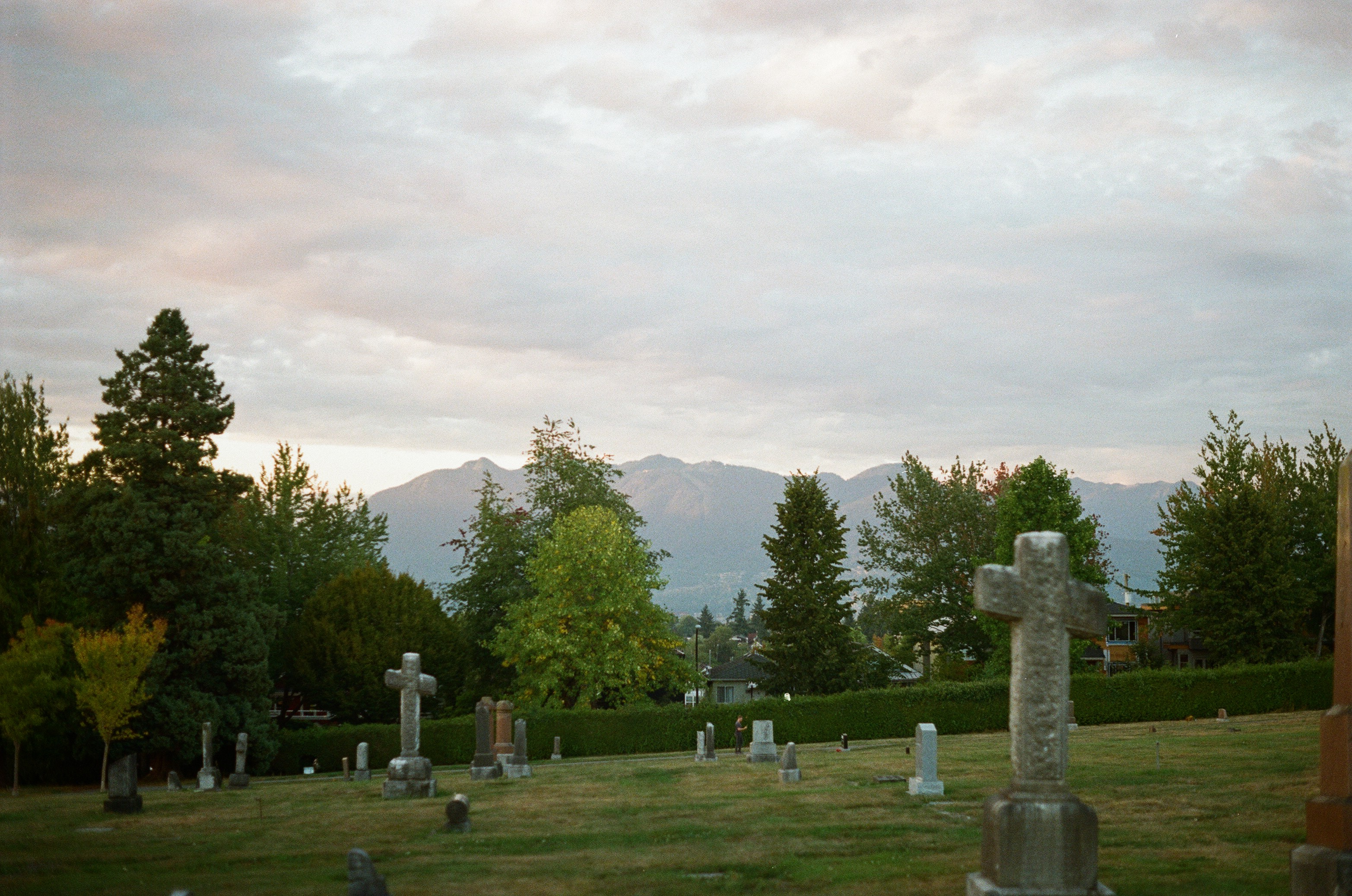
Photo from Vancouver Mountainview cemetery showing mountains north of the city

The Jones farm between 37th and 41st Avenues was added in 1910 as the Jones I and Jones II Additions, and in 1922 an additional piece was acquired west of the Horne I Addition. The "1919 Addition" is a tract bounded by 41st and 43rd Avenues, and contains many victims of the Spanish flu pandemic. The last area added is the Abray Park Addition on the western side, acquired in 1941 through a land swap with the Vancouver Park Board and named after a squatter, Nonus Abray, who had tended an orchard on the land and grazed his cattle there.

Burial sites historically were often grouped together along the lines of religion (e.g. Jewish), nationality (e.g. Chinese and Japanese), or organizational affiliation (e.g. Freemasons and Oddfellows). Other groupings are pauper grave sites and war veterans.

The New Chelsea Housing Society and the Department of Veterans' Affairs installed three granite stelai in the cemetery in 1983, dedicated to all Canadian military members who have died. The cemetery has more than 12,000 Canadian military graves. The Commonwealth War Graves Commission maintains the graves of 579 Commonwealth service personnel – 319 from World War I and 260 from World War II. The war graves of World War I are in a Soldiers' Plot; some of those of World War II are in a Veterans' Plot, and the others are scattered in other parts of the cemetery. Most of the airmen buried here died serving at the Royal Canadian Air Force base at Sea Island, and many of the sailors were from the HMCS Discovery naval station of the Royal Canadian Navy Volunteer Reserve.

In 2005, Birmingham & Wood Architects were commissioned to design three buildings and collaborate in the design of landscape elements as part of an upgrade to Mountain View Cemetery. This included an administration building, a landscape maintenance facility, and a building for memorial services and associated functions. That "Celebration Hall" has also become a popular venue for cultural events, adding to the City's roster of performance spaces.

The 2005 upgrade also involved a number of other businesses: two firms of landscape architects, Lees + Associates Landscape Architects and Phillips Farevaag Smallenberg; BTY Group cost consultants; Commonwealth Historic Resource Management Limited heritage consultants; Bush Bohlman Consulting Engineers, The RADA Group, and Perez Engineering. The cemetery was officially rededicated July 2009.

Mountain View has been one of the few North American cemeteries allowing two members of a family to share the same grave. As of January 1, 2020, City Council expanded this practice via a by-law allowing individuals to share their own or their deceased loved one's grave with non-family members, either by purchasing a single gravesite together or by allowing the cemetery to offer unused spaces to others; up to three individuals may share a grave. This option only applies to new graves, and is primarily designed to reduce the environmental footprint of burial. It is also less expensive, as the cost of the plot is divided among the individuals. Those opting for this arrangement are buried one above another in a single 4-by-8-foot (1.2 m × 2.4 m) plot, in a column to a depth of 9 feet (2.7 m), and must consent to being interred without a traditional casket – instead using a more environmentally-sustainable option such as 'a shroud or biodegradable container'.

== Notable occupants ==
=== Disaster victims ===
- 1918: sinking of the SS Princess Sophia near Juneau, Alaska, the worst maritime disaster in terms of casualties on the Pacific Coast of North America. Sixty-six of the 353 passengers who perished were buried in Mountain View.
- 1910: Rogers Pass slide disaster (62 victims, 30 buried at Mountain View)
- 1909: Lakeview BCER streetcar wreck. This was the worst transit accident in Vancouver's history (15 killed, 12 buried at Mountain View).

=== Individuals ===
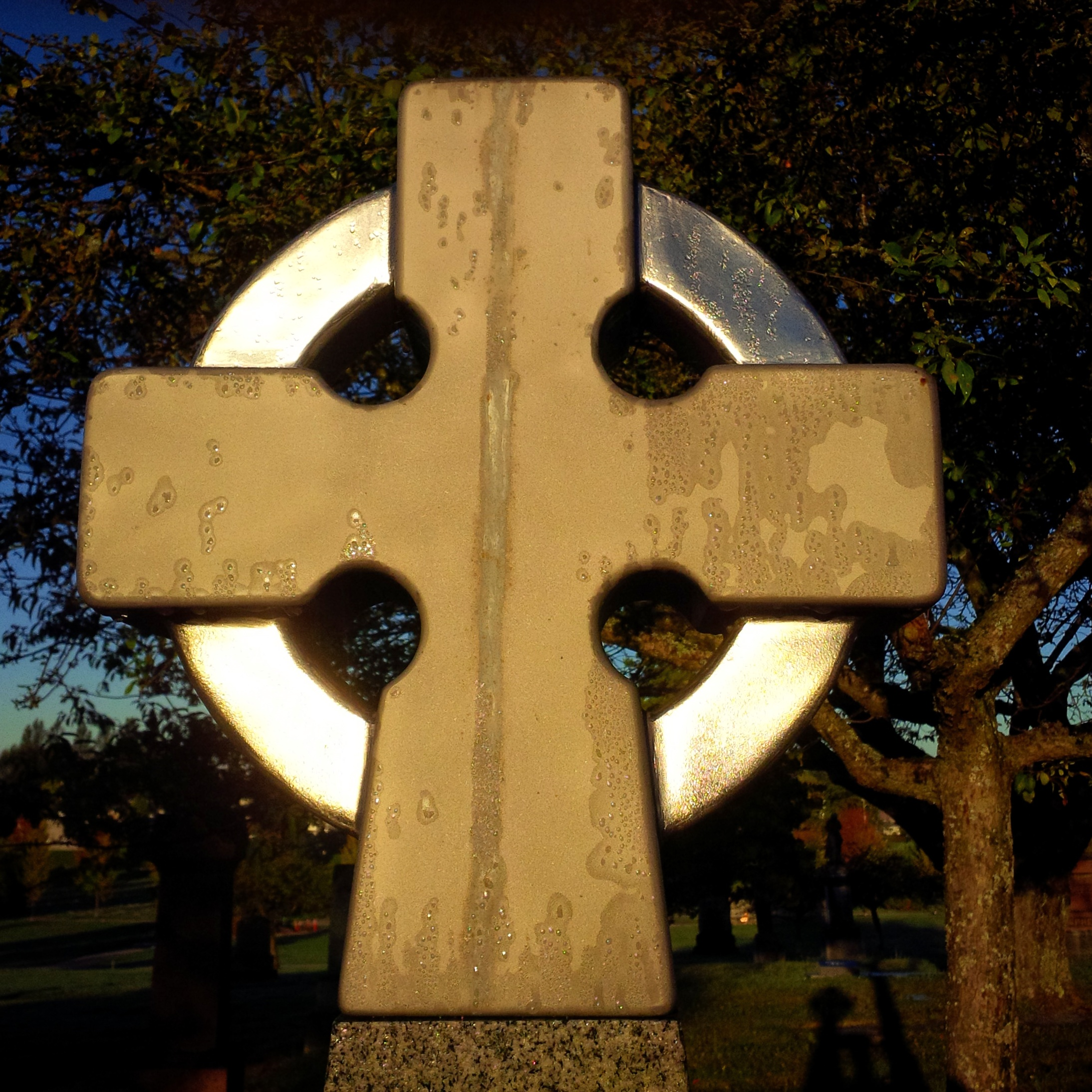
Monument on top of the gravestone for Malcolm Alexander MacLean, the first Mayor of Vancouver, at Mountain View Cemetery

- Malcolm Alexander MacLean, first Mayor of Vancouver, serving 1886 to 1887.
- Ross J. McLeod, unrelated to Alexander, Co-Founder of Great Canadian Gaming
- Alexander McLeod, unrelated to Ross, lighthouse keeper at Stanley Park's Brockton Point lighthouse, also in charge of firing the 9 O'Clock Gun.
- Harry Churchill Beet, recipient of the Victoria Cross for gallantry during the Second Boer War.
- Henry O. Bell-Irving, wealthy cannery owner
- Edward Evans Blackmore, local architect and designer of the city's first Pantages Theatre.
- Lieutenant-Colonel Alfred Carey, recipient of two DSOs and the Order of St Michael and St George.
- William Carey Ditmars, business man who brought the first automobile to Vancouver.
- Charles Edgar Edgett, DSO, MiD, warden of the BC Penitentiary from 1929 to 1931, Chief Constable of the Vancouver Police from 1931 to 1933, and zealous anticommunist.
- Ben Flores, a.k.a., "Benson Flores", Filipino pioneer of Bowen Island.
- Joe Fortes, a.k.a., "Old Black Joe", popular lifeguard.
- Samuel Greer, fought with the CPR over his claim to Kitsilano Beach.
- Eric Hamber, Lieutenant Governor from 1936 to 1941.
- Laurence William Herchmar, fifth commissioner of the North-West Mounted Police.
- Harry Jerome, Olympic runner.
- John Chipman Kerr, Victoria Cross recipient
- Thomas Ladner, founder of Ladner, British Columbia.
- Malcolm MacLennan, Chief Constable of the Vancouver Police, killed in the line of duty in 1917.
- Robert McBeath, Victoria Cross recipient, killed in the line of duty as a Vancouver police constable in 1921 at the age of 23.
- William McGuigan, tenth mayor of Vancouver.
- Sara Anne McLagan, first woman newspaper publisher in Canada.
- James Skitt Mathews, Vancouver historian and archivist.

- Rev. George Charles Fraser Pringle 1873–1949 founder of Camp Pringle, Shawnigan Lake, B.C. From the boat "Sky Pilot", of the Loggers Mission, he ministered to over 75 logging camps and communities on the west coast of B.C. He served in the Yukon during the Gold Rush, Atlin, in Northern B.C. as well as overseas as Chaplin during World War II. He is located in JONES section, Block 40, Plot 3, Lot 1, on Prince Edward Street.
- Frank Rogers, labour organizer murdered during a 1903 strike against the CPR.
- Robertha Josephine Marshall, survivor of the 1912 sinking of the Titanic.
- Jonathan Rogers, builder of the Rogers Building on Granville Street.
- Yip Sang, prominent Chinese business leader, founded the Wing Sang Company in 1888 and supplied the CPR with Chinese labourers.
- Sarah Emily Service, mother of poet Robert W. Service.
- Robert Shankland, Victoria Cross recipient. [NOTE: The cemetery records do not include any reference to Robert Shankland ever being interred in the cemetery. It may be that his cremated remains were scattered in the cemetery.]
- Janet Smith, a.k.a. the "Scottish Nightingale", murdered in 1924 in what became the notorious "Janet Smith Case".

== In popular culture ==
The graveyard is used as a location set for the Underworld in ABC's Once Upon a Time.
