= Multi-Age Cluster Class =

Gifted education program

Information
- Type: Leadership development; Gifted education
- Established: 1994
- Affiliation: Vancouver School Board

The Multi-Age Cluster Class or Middle Age Cluster Class (abbreviated MACC) is Vancouver's gifted education program. MACC targets highly gifted students with genius intelligence quotient (IQ) scores (150+), and is a gateway to the University Transition Program for attending the University of British Columbia at age 14–16. The program limits intake to 40-80 students.

MACC targets students in Grades 5 to 7 (Grades 6 to 8 in Coquitlam and Grades 5 to 7 in Surrey). It has extended to several schools located in the Greater Vancouver Regional District, namely Burnaby, Surrey, Coquitlam, Port Coquitlam, and Port Moody. MACC opened its doors in 1994. Surrey began offering the MACC program in 2003. Many graduates have gone on to national and international success.

== Process ==
The selection process for MACC involves several steps, where a child's suitability in the program is evaluated. A Grade 4-7 student is referred by their home school, teacher, gifted case manager, or parent for consideration for admission. Students are given a cognitive test. After that, students who are seen as potential gifted candidates are invited to spend one or two days in the classroom at the school they would attend.

== Vancouver Multi-Age Cluster Class ==
Currently, there are 3 schools hosting the MACC program in Vancouver. They are all administered by the Vancouver School Board.

- Tecumseh Elementary School
- Sir William Osler Elementary School
- Additionally, Kerrisdale Elementary School hosts the only French Immersion program. It was previously at General Gordon Elementary School, but was relocated due to seismic upgrades.

There were previous incarnations of MACC at Lord Nelson Elementary School, Queen Mary Elementary School, and David Livingstone Elementary School, but the program has shrunk slightly and relocated to its current base schools over the years due to a combination of VSB funding cuts, seismic upgrades, and perceived population shifts. A high school MACC program previously existed at Kitsilano Secondary School, though in the concept has evolved into the 'Mini-School', of which most MACC graduates attend.

== Surrey Multi-Age Cluster Class ==
Surrey has four MACC-equipped schools—Berkshire Park Elementary School, Hyland Elementary School, Erma Stephenson Elementary School, and Chantrell Creek Elementary School. The maximum number of students in each class is 20, with gender mix being relatively balanced.

Aspiring MACC students may apply in Grades 4, 5, or 6 to gain admission to the following grade. Applicants must be referred by their teachers and undergo a screening process.

Each Surrey MACC class features an Independent Math program, where students study mathematics with the aid of a textbook at their own pace - meaning there is typically no formal math instruction. Students learn via textbook until Grade 9, when some choose to pursue higher-level courses through SAIL.

Another unique aspect of the Surrey MACC programs are PIPs, or Personal Interest Projects. These long-term projects allow students to explore a topic of individual passion and share their learning through a presentation - typically a PowerPoint, although other forms of creative expression are highly encouraged. In the Chantrell MACC program, pupils present two PIPs each year: one during Term 2 and the other during Term 3. Each presentation usually includes Kahoot quizzes to solidify and reinforce the audience's new knowledge.

Surrey is currently in consideration of adding a high school program.

== Tri-Cities Multi Age Cluster Class ==
The Tri-Cities (Port Coquitlam, Coquitlam, Port Moody) has three MACC equipped schools, namely Citadel Middle School, Hillcrest Middle School, and Kwayhquitlum Middle School.

== Burnaby Multi-Age Cluster Class ==
In 2014, two MACC sites were added in Burnaby (School District 41) at Capitol Hill Elementary School and Suncrest Elementary. Both of these schools have a grade 4/5 and 6/7 class. There is also a Mini-School program located at Alpha Secondary School.

== See also ==
- Vancouver School Board
- Surrey School Board
- Tecumseh Elementary School
- Kerrisdale Elementary School
- Sir William Osler Elementary School
