= Leo Nickerson Elementary School =

Location
- 10 Sycamore Ave; St. Albert, Alberta, T8N 0K3; Canada; 53.6294°N 113.6073°W

Information
- School type: Public
- Founded: 1964
- School board: St. Albert Public School District No. 5565
- Principal: Michael Erickson
- Grades: K-6
- Enrollment: 633
- Language: English
- Website: ln.spschools.org

Leo Nickerson Elementary School is a dual-track school in St. Albert, Alberta, Canada, and is a part of St. Albert Public Schools. Opened in 1964, the elementary school was the fourth built by its school district. It was named after Leo Nickerson, a St. Albert cub scout leader who lost his life in an attempt to rescue several scouts who had been caught in the water during a sudden storm. As of 2019, the school has an enrolment of just over 630 students.

The school was the first in St. Albert to have a Parent Teacher Association. It celebrated its 50th anniversary in 2014.

== Programs ==
As of the 2019-2020 school year, Leo Nickerson offers two tracks for students to participate in: The English Program, and the French Immersion Program. Previously, the school offered a third track, the Logos Christian program, but provision of the track was centralized at Joseph M. Demko School when it opened in 2019.

=== English Program ===
The English Program provides classes with English being the language of instruction. It focuses in areas such as academics, fitness, the arts, and moral values.

=== French Immersion Program ===
The French Immersion Program provides classes with French being the language of instruction; English Language Arts is the notable exception. The program also provides an understanding of Francophone culture.

=== Kindergarten ===
The school offers both half and full days in the Kindergarten program, a program designed to introduce children of at least age five to the basic skills required for Grade 1. Skills learned include problem-solving, language and reading, expression through the arts, and developing positive relationships.

== History ==
=== 1960s ===
==== Inauguration & namesake ====
Leo Nickerson Elementary School held its first classes for around 225 students on September 1, 1964, following an opening ceremony on June 24 of that same year. The ceremony featured the laying of the cornerstone by Sylvia Nickerson, the widow of Leo Nickerson, who the school was named after. Leo Nickerson was a cub scout leader who had died during a scout outing at Wabamun Lake on July 14, 1961. Nickerson drowned during an attempt to save five boys who had become caught in the lake during a sudden storm. He saved two of the boys, but he and the three others perished during his attempt to save the remainder.

==== Parent Teacher Association ====
Leo Nickerson was the first and, for some time, only school in St. Albert to have a parent-teacher association (PTA). The PTA was formed in 1967 and replaced the Home and School Association, an organization of parents from various schools in St. Albert that was formed in 1964. When the Home and School Association dissolved, it divided its funds among its schools. Leo Nickerson used its funds to buy gym equipment. The new PTA held meet-the-teacher nights, science fairs, various demonstrations and campaigns, and purchased supplies for use in the school.

==== Corporal punishment controversy ====
Joseph Garber, the school's first principal, and his wife Thelma, a teacher at the school, resigned from their positions amid controversy in 1969. The resignations were a result of allegations of mistreatment by some teachers toward the students. In late March, a group of parents met at a board meeting to express their concerns over the excessive use and types of corporal punishment used in the school. Examples of punishment provided by the group included hair and ear pulling, as well as arm twisting. It was also said that there had been reports of swearing and derogatory comments made by the teachers toward the students. The parents suggested that Garber's replacement come from outside of the staff at Leo Nickerson, and that the new administrator be instated immediately so that he could become familiar with the school and adequately prepare for the next school year. It was suggested that his "opinions regarding staff carry considerable weight."

Of the matter, Garber said that "there has to be unity of purpose, and I don't think we had it," adding that "some things have to be cleared up, not only in our school, but in the whole district." The district responded the following week in two letters to St. Albert's newspaper The Gazette that Garber's assessment was unfair to "the excellent educators in our district," and that the statement came as a complete surprise. The letters followed by saying the board had been concerned about the climate at the school for some time, and that it would accept Garber's resignation.

The district's board of trustees launched an investigation into the matter following the resignations. The production of a remedial report was assigned to Muriel Martin, supervisor of elementary education, and future namesake of Muriel Martin Elementary School. Citing privacy concerns, the board decided that the report would not be made public, as it contained comments about some staff members. Some of the suggestions in the report were that activities periods be discontinued in favour of Language Arts, that there be a minor reshuffling of teacher roles, and that a school philosophy be developed. Lowell Throndson took over Garber's position shortly after.

Dr. J. W. Chalmers, the district's superintendent, resigned in March the same year. It was expected that the system would have forty empty teaching positions by the end of that school term.

=== 1970s ===
==== Report cards ====
In 1970 parents were polled on the replacement of report cards with parent-teacher interviews. Such a replacement had already been put to trial at Vital Grandin, a school in the public school system. Results of the poll were overwhelmingly against the change, with 151 parents being against, 10 for, and 8 undecided. Other options the poll asked about were whether interviews should accompany report cards, if interviews should only be held if requested by either the parents or teachers, if report cards should use the "H, A, B, C, D" system, if the present system of parent teacher interviews and frequency of report cards was satisfactory, and if report cards should consist of teacher comments only but no grades at all. A teacher committee was created to enact some of the suggestions made during polling.

==== House system ====
In 1974, Leo Nickerson's principal Frank Carnahan instituted a house system similar to that used in the UK. Students were split among four houses named for astrological signs: Aquarius (blue), Gemini (yellow), Scorpio (green), and Taurus (red). The house system allowed for both assistance among students within the same house, as well as friendly competition between the houses. Students could earn points for their houses in various ways, such as through participation in a jogging trip. School assemblies also began to be held every Monday.

=== 1980s ===
==== French Immersion ====
The school became a dual-track school with the introduction of the French Immersion program in the mid 1980s. At its outset, it served children in Kindergarten to Grade 4.

==== Renovations ====
The Leo Nickerson school building underwent major renovations in 1986. The renovations cost $1 million, and included the building of a new gym. A statue of Leo Nickerson was unveiled at the ribbon cutting ceremony; the ribbon was cut by his widow Sylvia, who had attended the school's opening in 1964. The following year, a new playground and landscaping project was completed. The project was organized by a committee of students, parents, and teachers, who raised $77,000 to complete it.

=== 1990s ===
==== Logos Christian program ====
The Logos program was introduced to the school in 1998, making Leo Nickerson a triple-track school. The Logos program was offered to both French and English students, and offered its teachings in a Christian-based context. The introduction of the program saw the school's enrolment numbers rise substantially over the following years. Multiple schools in the district hosted the program until it was consolidated under one school at Joseph M. Demko School when it opened in the fall of 2019.

=== 2010s ===
==== 50th anniversary ====
The school celebrated its 50th anniversary on June 14, 2014, and the event was marked by the painting of a mural and the laying of a memorial plaque, which was placed with the cornerstone that was laid by Sylvia Nickerson when the school first opened. The event was attended by Nickerson and her daughters. A time capsule was also placed inside a bench in the school's lobby.
