= Sir Alexander Mackenzie Elementary School =

Sir Alexander Mackenzie Elementary
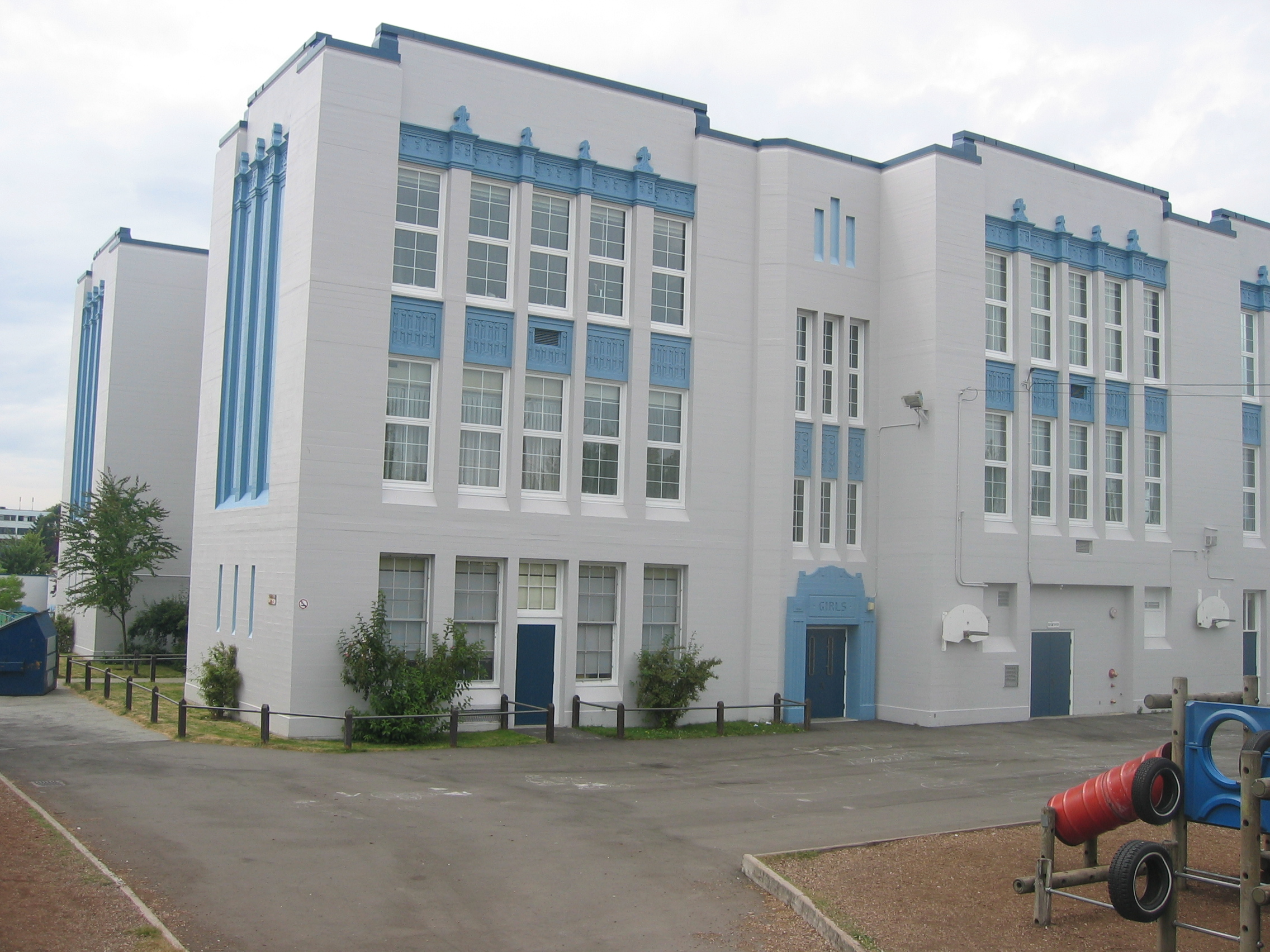
- Picture of Sir Alexander Mackenzie Elementary in 2006

Location
- 960 39th Ave E Vancouver, British Columbia, V5W 1K8; Canada; 49.2344°N 123.0861°W

Information
- School type: Public, Elementary school
- Motto: "Be safe little dragons"
- School board: School District 39 Vancouver
- School number: 3939079
- Principal: Lisa Nucich
- Grades: K-7
- Enrollment: 430 (2021)
- Colours: Blue and White
- Mascot: Mackenzie Dragons
- Website: mackenzie.vsb.bc.ca

Sir Alexander Mackenzie Elementary School is an elementary school in Vancouver, British Columbia, Canada. The school is in School District 39 Vancouver. Located at 960 39th Ave E, the school was built in 1930. The school is named after the explorer Alexander Mackenzie.

== History ==
Mackenzie was constructed in 1925 with an enrollment of about 25 to 30 students. In 1930 the official school was built and opened for grades K to 7. Students had to wear uniforms which were the school colours of blue and white. The girls had to go in through the east side and the boys had to go in through the west side. In 2005 it was the celebration of 75 years of teaching at Sir Alexander Mackenzie, an important occasion for the school.

== Programs ==
Mackenzie offers a variety of programs from music to physical education along with the normal courses offered in the Vancouver curriculum.

=== Activities ===
Students attending the school have the opportunity to join groups such as choir and a variety sports teams. Track and field, cross country, soccer, basketball and volleyball are examples of the sports offered. They also have a band program and a YMCA. There is also an annual Terry Fox Run that raises money for cancer research in Canada.

== See also ==
- Sir Alexander Mackenzie Senior Public School in Toronto, named after Sir Alexander Mackenzie (explorer)
- Sir Alexander Mackenzie School (St. Albert), also named after Sir Alexander Mackenzie
- Vancouver School Board, the school district that operates and maintains the school
