= Vancouver Learning Network =

Location
- 530 East 41st Avenue; Vancouver, British Columbia, V5W 1P3; Canada; 49.2319867°N 123.0936271°W

Information
- School type: Public, Distributed Learning
- Founded: 1990
- School board: School District 39 Vancouver
- Principal: Jim Rutley
- Grades: K-12
- Website: vlns.ca
- Last updated: February 13, 2020

The Vancouver Learning Network (formerly Greater Vancouver Regional Correspondence School) is a public distance education secondary school headquartered in Vancouver, British Columbia, Canada. It is part of the Vancouver School Board.

VLN is located at the John Oliver Secondary School in Vancouver, BC. It has its own hallway in which it can operate. In this hallway, there is a VLN office, a book room, a multi-use classroom, and a computer lab. Students are able to complete their work at one of the 15 computers in the lab. A resource teacher is present to assist students in all areas of study. Students may also receive help from their teachers located in the same building.

The school has self-paced online and paper-based courses. All courses are tuition-free to students as long as they are Canadian citizens and residents of British Columbia. A majority of VLN students attend a home secondary school but take one or two classes on VLN.

All courses must be completed within 12 months from the day the student submits the first assignment. A student learning plan (SLP) is created by the students before they begin a class, and they must reflect on those timelines.

Ongoing (12 months per year) teacher support and availability, numerous face-to-face requirements, and in-person activities have helped establish VLN as a legitimate and thriving school community. Elluminate sessions are provided as an alternative for students who are unable to attend.
