= Bellerose Composite High School =

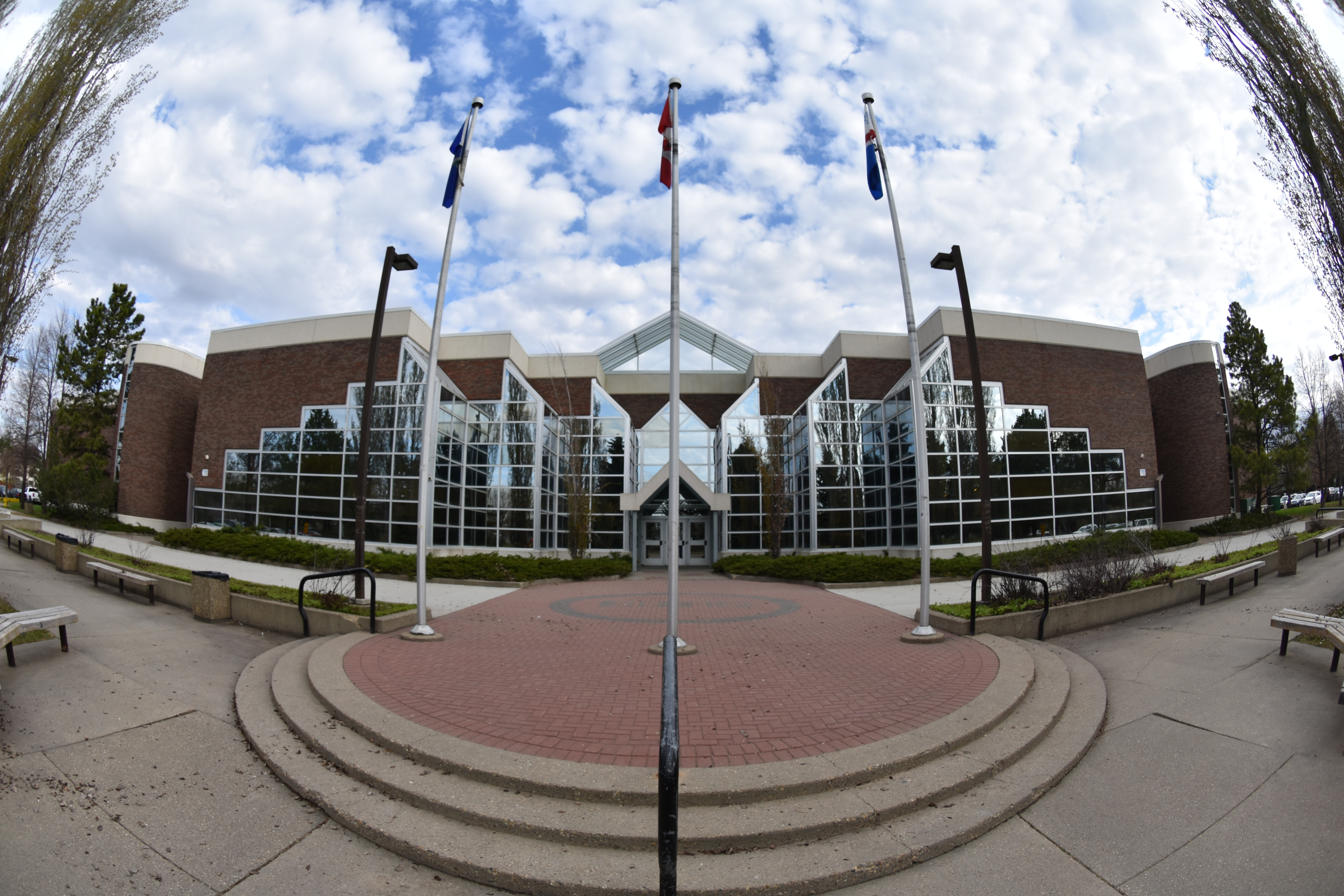

Location
- 49 Giroux Rd; St. Albert, AB, T8N 6N4; Canada; 53.647262°N 113.657507°W

Information
- School type: Public
- Founded: 1988
- School board: St. Albert Public Schools
- Principal: Peter Fenton
- Staff: 94
- Grades: 10-12
- Enrollment: 950
- Language: English
- Colours: Burgundy & Grey
- Mascot: Rosie the Bulldog
- Team name: Bulldogs
- Website: bchs.spschools.org

Bellerose Composite High School (BCHS) is a high school located in northwest St. Albert, Alberta, Canada. It is a member of St. Albert Public Schools and was the second Protestant high school in St. Albert.

Bellerose Composite High School opened in 1988, alleviating strain from Paul Kane High School, which at the time was overpopulated. It was named after the Bellerose family, who came to the region in 1849 and built St. Albert's first school, which now resides in Fort Edmonton Park.

== History ==
Construction of Bellerose high school started in 1987.
