= General Wolfe Elementary School =

General Wolfe Elementary School may refer to:

- General Wolfe Elementary School (Vancouver), Vancouver, British Columbia
- Wolfe Street Academy, formerly the General Wolfe Elementary School, part of the Baltimore City Public Schools
