= St. Albert Public Schools =

Alberta School District

The St. Albert School Division St. Albert Public Schools

Location
- 60 Sir Winston Churchill Ave; St. Albert, Alberta, Canada Canada

District information
- Type: Public
- Grades: Preschool to 12
- Established: 1958
- Superintendent: Krimsen Sumners
- Asst. superintendent(s): Marianne Barret, Paul Macleod, Michael Brenneis
- Chair of the board: Glenys Edwards
- Schools: Bellerose, Paul Kane, Elmer S. Gish, Robert Rundle, Keenooshayo, Ronald Harvey, Leo Nickerson, Sir Alexander Mackenzie, Lois E. Hole, Sir George Simpson, Lorne Akins, St. Albert Public Preschool, Muriel Martin, Wild Rose, Outreach, William D. Cuts, St. Gabriel, Joseph M. Demko School

Other information
- Zone: 2/3
- Website: www.spschools.org

St. Albert Public Schools, formally St. Albert Public School District No. 5565, is a public school authority within the Canadian province of Alberta operated out of St. Albert. The board is a member of Zone 2/3. The district was formerly known as Protestant Separate School District No. 6. Approximately 8,000 students are enrolled in St. Albert Public Schools.

== History ==
Protestant Separate School District No. 6 was founded on April 1, 1958. The board was founded as a result of a meeting called by Dr. William Cuts in February earlier that year. The demographics of St. Albert at that time was made up largely of protestants who desired their own school board, and so the group voted to form a separate district.

The opening of Sir Alexander Mackenzie Elementary School, the board's first school, was set for that fall, but was delayed due to disagreements between the architect of the school and the province. For the first four months of that school year, the district's first 98 grade 1 through 7 students took their classes in the basement of St. Albert United Church instead. The school opened the next year in January of 1959.

By 1961 Alexander Mackenzie school was unable to handle the needs of the rising population of St. Albert, and so a second school, Sir George Simpson Junior High School, was built across town. Construction of a high school began in that same year, and in 1963 Paul Kane High School opened its doors. The high school was built to meet the needs of students whose only other option was the St. Albert Catholic High School. The elementary schools Leo Nickerson and Robert Rundle were built shortly after in 1964 and 1965, respectively.

In 1973 Paul Kane also found its student body to be growing to unmanageable numbers, and so a new school was built across the way from its current location. The old building became Lorne Akins Junior High. Ronald Harvey Elementary School later opened in 1976, and William D. Cuts Junior High School and Wild Rose Elementary School opened in 1978.

Elmer S. Gish Elementary School opened in 1981, followed by Keenooshayo Elementary School. Bellerose Composite High School was then built later in 1988, diverting some of the stress from Paul Kane.

Muriel Martin Elementary School was built in 1991, and was the only new school built until 2016, which saw the opening of Lois E. Hole Elementary School. Outreach High School, however, was opened in the interim, taking over the former office of the district headquarters, which had relocated. The district also offers a St. Albert Public Preschool program at a site on McKenny Avenue, as well as at its headquarters and the Wild Rose and Keenooshayo elementary schools.

In 2018 the Alberta government announced that Paul Kane would be replaced in 2022, making it the third building the school will have had since it first opened nearly sixty years ago.

== Publification ==
The Protestant School Board became public in 2012 and was renamed to St. Albert Public School District No. 5565 after being asked to do so by the Alberta Government, making it the primary board for St. Albert. The district is also called St. Albert Public Schools locally. The move meant that more funds could be allocated to the district.

== See also ==
- List of school authorities in Alberta
