= Mackenzie Bay, Canada =

Mackenzie Bay
- Location
- Location: Yukon / Northwest Territories
- Coordinates: 69°16′N 136°27′W
- Ocean/sea sources: Beaufort Sea
- Basin countries: Canada

Mackenzie Bay is a natural inlet in northern Canada, named for the explorer Sir Alexander Mackenzie. It is an arm of the Beaufort Sea. To the west is Herschel Island and the Yukon mainland. To the east is Richards Island, NW Territories.
