= Elsie Roy Elementary School =

Elsie Roy Elementary
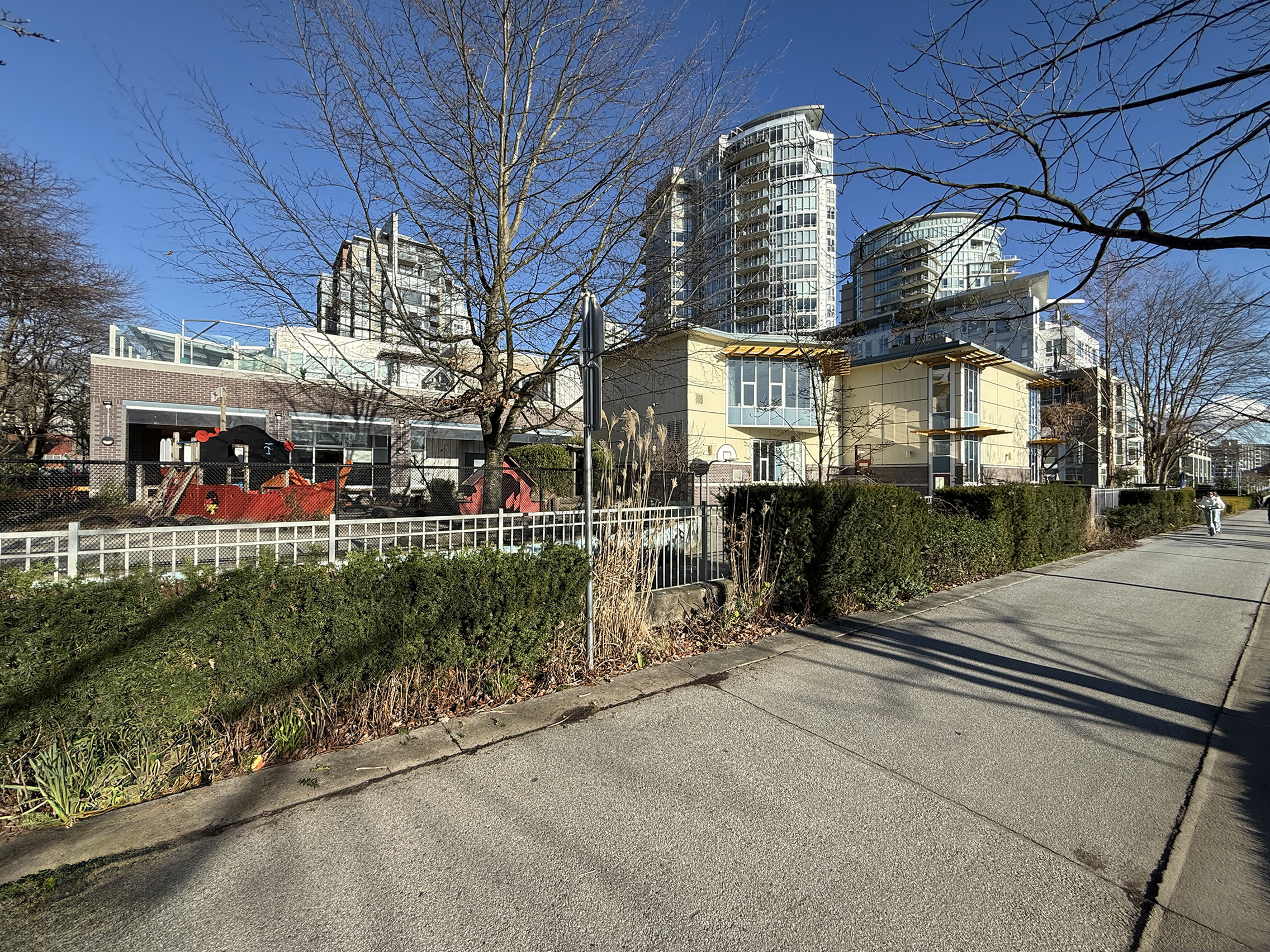
- Elsie Roy Elementary School

Location
- 150 Drake St; Vancouver, British Columbia, V6Z 2X1; Canada; 49°16′20″N 123°7′21″W

Information
- School type: Public, Elementary school
- Established: 2004
- School board: School District 39 Vancouver
- School number: 3939140
- Principal: Megan Davies
- Grades: K-7
- Enrollment: 429 (2021)
- Website: www.vsb.bc.ca/schools/elsie-roy/Pages/default.aspx

Elsie Roy Elementary is a public elementary school located in Yaletown, Downtown Vancouver, that is part of Vancouver School Board District No. 39. It opened in 2004 and is noted for being the first additional elementary school to be opened in an inner-city Vancouver neighbourhood since 1975. The school is named in honour of Elsie Roy; a long time VSB staff of 44 years and children's book author, who died in 1986 at the age of 99.

It is a member of the "Downtown Family of Schools" with King George Secondary School, Lord Roberts Elementary School, Lord Roberts Annex, and Crosstown Elementary. Elsie Roy is also part of the Middle Years Baccalaureate with King George Secondary and Lord Roberts Elementary.

Over the past few years, Elsie Roy has invested in various educational technology for its staff, teachers and students. In 2010, with the launch of the Elsie Roy iPad Project, the school has built an environment including corner-to-corner Wi-Fi, smartboards in every classroom and library, netbooks, iPods, iPads, Microsoft Surfaces and cloud based education software including Moodle and other sites. The iPad Project has resulted in the creation of the Elsie Roy Tech Program where students learn the environment and provide in class support to their teachers and staff.

As of 2008 the school has been criticized for being overcrowded.
