= Elmer S. Gish School =

Elmer S. Gish Elementary & Junior High School

Location
- 75 Akins Drive; St. Albert, Alberta, T8N 2W9; Canada; 53.631108°N 113.586305°W

Information
- Type: Public
- Founded: 1981
- School board: The St. Albert School Division
- Superintendent: Krimsen Sumners
- School number: 60: Adam Rurka (Assistant Principal); Sue Werner (Assistant Principal)
- Grades: K-9
- Enrollment: 860
- Language: English
- Colours: Burgundy and Gray
- Team name: Warriors
- Website: esgish.spschools.org

Elmer S. Gish School (formally known as Elmer S. Gish Elementary/Junior High School) is an Elementary-Junior High school located in St. Albert, Alberta, Canada. The school has been in operation since 1981 and was named after a St. Albert educator. The school is part of St. Albert Public Schools.

The school is a double-track school, offering Kindergarten to Grade 9 in the Cogito program, and Kindergarten to Grade 6 for the global program. The current principal is Derek Harrison, and the Assistant Principals are Adam Rurka and Sue Werner.

== Awards ==
In August 2010, Kindergarten teacher Derek Harrison was honored as one of the top three teachers in Canada by Canadian Family Magazine.
