= Alexander Mackenzie (explorer) =

Scottish explorer and fur trader (1764–1820)

Sir Alexander Mackenzie
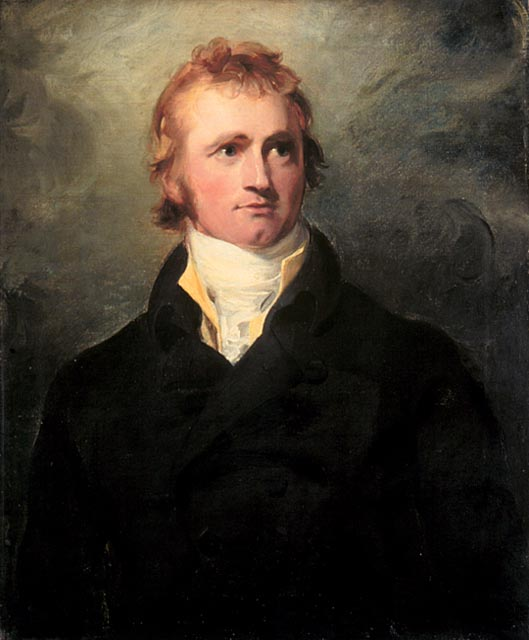
- Portrait by Sir Thomas Lawrence, c. 1800
- Born: c. 1764; Stornoway, Isle of Lewis, Scotland
- Died: 12 March 1820 (aged 55–56); Dunkeld, Perthshire, Scotland
- Occupations: Explorer, fur trader
- Known for: Mackenzie River; Mackenzie, British Columbia
- Spouse: Geddes Mackenzie (m. 1812)
- Children: 3
- Parents: Kenneth 'Corc' Mackenzie (1731–1780) (father); Isabella MacIver (mother)

Sir Alexander Mackenzie (c. 1764 – 12 March 1820) was a Scottish explorer and fur trader known for accomplishing the first crossing of North America north of Mexico by a European in 1793. The Mackenzie River and Mount Sir Alexander are named after him. As a leading member of the North West Company, he aspired to extend the Company's operations into western Canada and sell furs gained from there in China. His ambitions competed with the monopoly positions of both the Hudson's Bay Company and the East India Company.

== Early life ==
Mackenzie was born in Stornoway in Lewis. He was the third of the four children born to Kenneth 'Corc' Mackenzie (1731–1780) and his wife Isabella MacIver, from another prominent mercantile family in Stornoway. When 14 years old, Mackenzie's father had served as an ensign to protect Stornoway during the Jacobite rising of 1745. He later became a merchant and held the tack of Melbost. His grandfather was a younger brother of Murdoch Mackenzie, 6th Laird of Fairburn.

The young Alexander Mackenzie was educated at the same school as Colin Mackenzie, who became an army officer and first Surveyor General of India. Alexander as a boy sailed in 1774 to New York City with his father to join an uncle, John Mackenzie, after his mother died in Scotland. In 1776, during the American War of Independence, his father and uncle resumed their military duties and joined the King's Royal Regiment of New York as lieutenants. By 1778, for his safety as a son of loyalists, Alexander Mackenzie was sent, or went accompanied by two aunts, to Montreal. By 1779 (a year before his father's death at Carleton Island), Mackenzie had a secured apprenticeship with Finlay, Gregory & Co., one of the most influential fur trading companies in Montreal. It was later administered by Archibald Norman McLeod. In 1787, the company merged with the North West Company.

== Explorations ==
=== 1789 Mackenzie River expedition to the Arctic Ocean ===
On behalf of the North West Company, Mackenzie journeyed to Lake Athabasca where, in 1788, he was one of the founders of Fort Chipewyan. He had been sent to replace Peter Pond, a partner in the North West Company. From Pond, he learned that the First Nations people understood that the local rivers flowed to the north-west. Thinking that it would lead to Cook Inlet in Alaska, he set out by canoe on the river known to the local Dene First Nations people as the Dehcho (later named for the explorer as Mackenzie River), on 3 July 1789. On 14 July he reached the Arctic Ocean, rather than the Pacific. Later, in a letter to his cousin Roderick, he called the waterway "the River Disappointment," since the river did not prove to be the Northwest Passage for which he had hoped. This story is probably apocryphal, as Mackenzie's own and contemporary records refer to it simply as the "Grand River." The river later came to be known as the Mackenzie River in his honour.

=== 1792–93 Peace River expedition to the Pacific Ocean ===
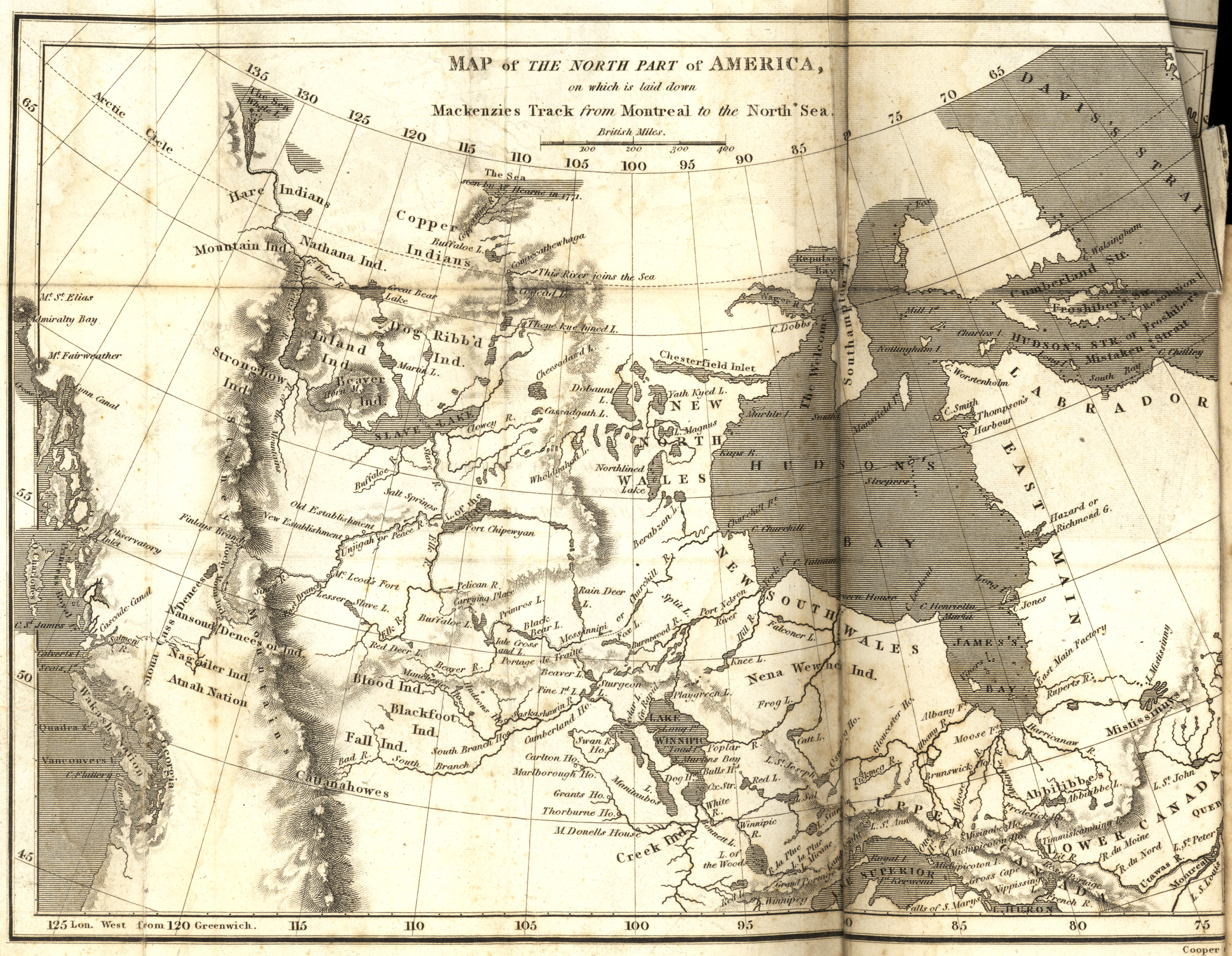
Map of the North Part of America on which is laid down Mackenzie's Track from Montreal to the North Sea

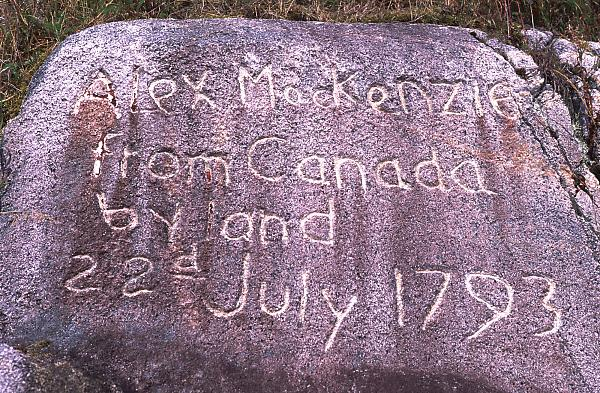
Inscription on a stone at the end of Alexander Mackenzie's 1792–1793 Canada crossing from the Peace River to the Pacific Ocean coast; located at 52°22′43″N 127°28′14″W

In 1791, Mackenzie returned to Great Britain to study the new advance in the measurement of longitude. In the aftermath of the Nootka Crisis with Spain, he returned to Canada in 1792, and set out to find a route to the Pacific. Accompanied by two native guides (one named Cancre), his cousin, Alexander MacKay, six Canadian voyageurs (Joseph Landry, Charles Ducette, François Beaulieu, Baptiste Bisson, Francois Courtois, Jacques Beauchamp), and a dog simply referred to as "our dog", Mackenzie left Fort Chipewyan on 10 October 1792. The party travelled via the Pine River to the Peace River. From there he travelled to a fork on the Peace River, arriving 1 November, where he and his cohorts built a fortification that they resided in over the winter. This later became known as Fort Fork.

Mackenzie left Fort Fork on 9 May 1793, following the route of the Peace River. He crossed the Great Divide and found the upper reaches of the Fraser River, but was warned by the local natives that the Fraser Canyon to the south was unnavigable and populated by belligerent tribes. He was instead directed to follow a grease trail by ascending the West Road River, crossing over the Coast Mountains and descending the Bella Coola River to the sea. He followed this advice and reached the Pacific coast on 20 July 1793, at Bella Coola, British Columbia, on North Bentinck Arm, an inlet of the Pacific Ocean. Having done this, Mackenzie had completed the first recorded transcontinental crossing of North America north of Mexico, 12 years before Americans Lewis and Clark. He had unknowingly missed meeting George Vancouver at Bella Coola by 48 days.

He had wanted to continue westward out of a desire to reach the open ocean, but was stopped by the hostility of the Heiltsuk people. Hemmed in by Heiltsuk war canoes, he wrote a message on a rock near the water's edge of Dean Channel, using a reddish paint made of vermilion and bear grease, and turned back east. The painting read: "“Alexander Mackenzie, from Canada, by land, the twenty-second of July, one thousand seven hundred and ninety-three”" (at the time Canada was a name for the former French territory in what is now southern Quebec and Ontario). The words, partly abbreviated, were later inscribed permanently by (Captain) R.P. Bishop and his surveyors in 1923. The site is now Sir Alexander Mackenzie Provincial Park and is designated First Crossing of North America National Historic Site. In 2016, Mackenzie was named a National Historic Person.

He returned the way he had come, arriving at Fort Chipewyan on Aug. 24. He spent the winter there working in the fur trade. The next year he returned to Montreal. Soon after, he travelled to the U.S. and to London. After he returned to Montreal, he became one of the leading partners of the North West Company. In 1799 he left the Company and travelled to London to lobby on behalf of the Canadian fur trade. In 1800 he returned to Canada and aided in the formation of the New North West Company (also known as the XY Company).

In his journal Mackenzie made the first record of the Carrier language, an Athabaskan language.

== Later life and family ==
In 1801 he returned to London and that year the journals of his exploratory journeys were published. (They were later reprinted.)

He then presented a detailed plan of his west coast project to the British government "Preliminaries to the Establishment of a Permanent British Fishery and Trade in Furs etc. on the Continent and West Coast of North America." The British government, at the time predicting conflict with Napoleon, took no action. (Later Simon Fraser and David Thompson worked to extend the Canadian fur trade and prevent U.S. incursion in what would be Canada.)

Mackenzie was knighted in 1802.

He returned to Canada, where as Sir Alexander Mackenzie, he was lionized. He was elected to the Legislature of Lower Canada. He served as member for Huntingdon County from 1804 to 1808.

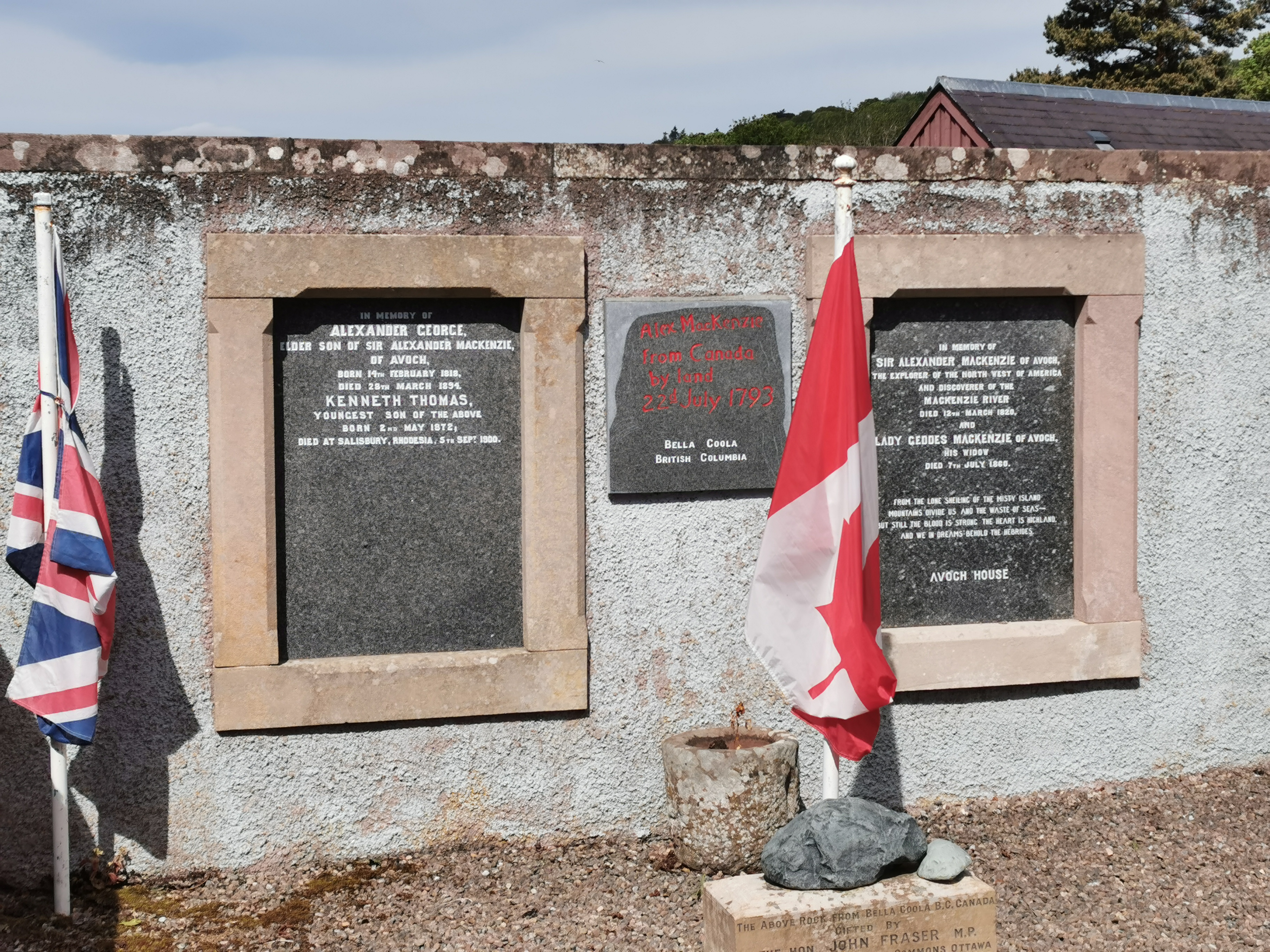
Burial site of Alexander Mackenzie at Avoch Parish Church in the village of Avoch, Scotland; including a replica of the stone he painted at Bella Coola, British Columbia

In 1812 Mackenzie, then aged 48, returned to Scotland, where he married 14-year-old Geddes Mackenzie, twin heiress of Avoch. They had two sons and a daughter. Her grandfather, Captain John Mackenzie of Castle Leod (great-grandson of George Mackenzie, 2nd Earl of Seaforth), purchased the estate of Avoch with money left to him by his first cousin and brother-in-law, Admiral George Geddes Mackenzie. Lady Mackenzie's father was a first cousin of the father of George Simpson, Governor of the Hudson's Bay Company. The Mackenzies lived alternately in Avoch and London.

He died in 1820 of Bright's disease, at about the age of 56 (his date of birth is unknown). He is buried at Avoch on the Black Isle.

== Legacy ==
The Mackenzie River and Mount Sir Alexander are named for him, as is Mackenzie Bay, and the municipality of Mackenzie, British Columbia.

There are a number of schools in Canada named after him, such as Sir Alexander Mackenzie Senior Public School in Toronto, Sir Alexander Mackenzie Elementary School in Vancouver, and Sir Alexander Mackenzie Elementary School in St. Albert. Also Sir Alexander Mackenzie School in the Bella Coola Valley, BC.

He is referenced in the 1981 folk song "Northwest Passage" by Stan Rogers.

The Alexander Mackenzie rose (Explorer Series), developed in 1985 by Agriculture and Agri-Food Canada, was named in his honour.

Between 1989 and 1993, the Mackenzie Bicentennial Sea-to-Sea Expeditions of Lakehead University attempted a segmented re-enactment of the journey between Montreal and Bella Coola, British Columbia, but was unable to complete the final overland 350 kilometres (220 mi) Grease Trail when its First Nation owners refused permission.
