= Lorne Akins Junior High School =

High school in St. Albert, Alberta, Canada

Coordinates: 53.6342°N 113.6077°W

Lorne Akins Junior High is a school in St. Albert, Alberta that teaches students in grades seven through nine.

Lorne Akins Junior High is named for the farmer that owned the property on which the school is currently built, first opening in 1963 as Paul Kane High School. In early 1973, Paul Kane moved to another building, and the Lorne Akins building opened in April 1973 as a junior high school, replacing the previous junior high Sir Alexander Mackenzie, which turned into an elementary school.

The current principal of the school is Derek Herman, and Jennifer Suriano is the assistant principal. who took over from principal Graham Jackson. Notable alumni from the school include NHL star Jarome Iginla.

The school is well known for its wrestling team, the Lorne Akins Crush, which produced nine different national champions under the 34 year coaching tenure of teacher Barrie Schulha, who retired in 2012. His wrestling program was the longest running continuous sports program at a junior high in St. Albert.

The school made national news when in 2009 Lt.-Col. Gary Blenkinsop, Canada's top soldier, reacted to American media slights against the Canadian presence in Afghanistan as a part of a Lorne Akins event supporting former Lorne Akins student Cpl. Scott Alm upon his return from the war.
