= Vancouver School Board =

Public school district in British Columbia, Canada

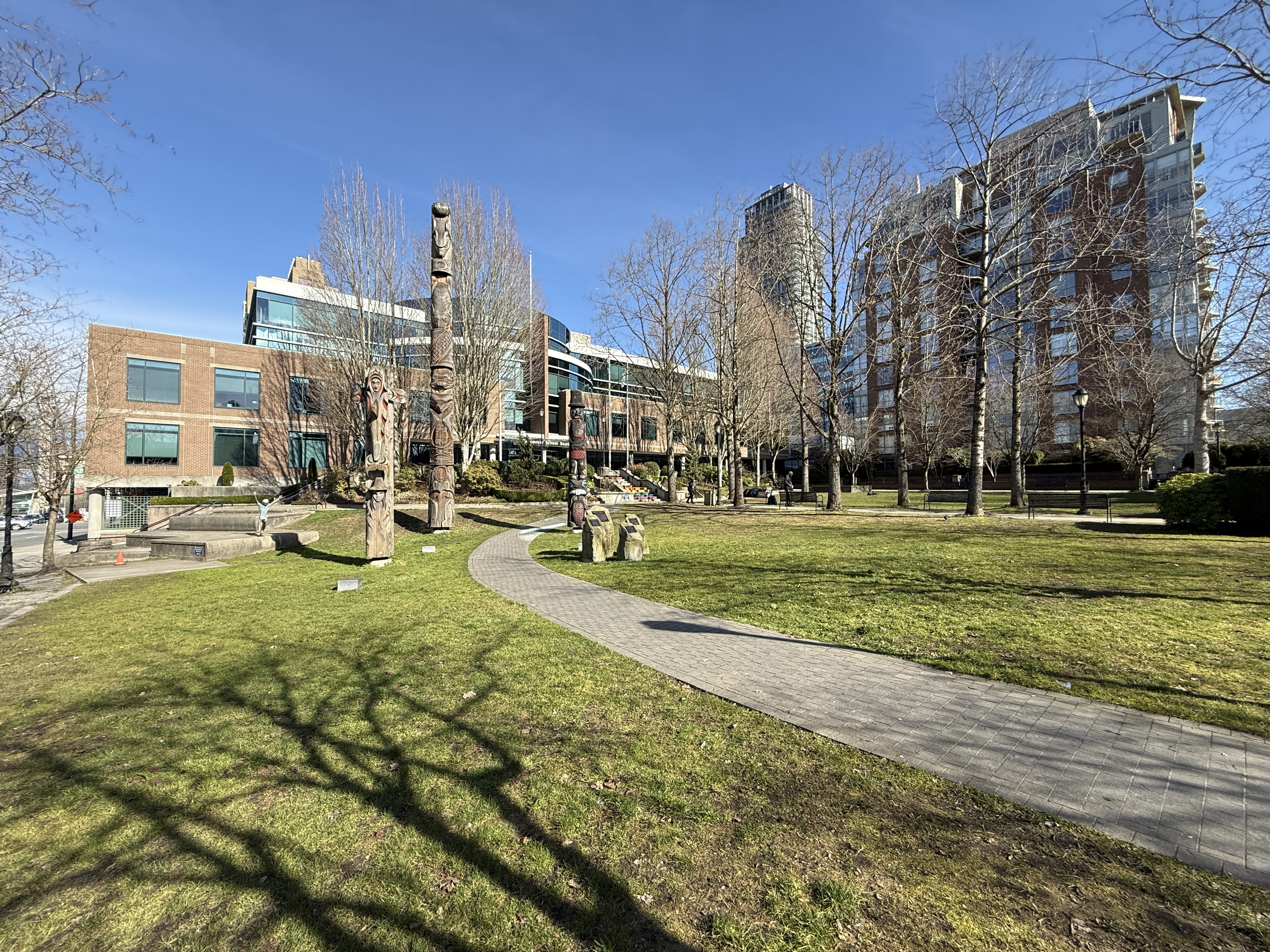

Location
- 1580 West Broadway, Vancouver British Columbia; Canada

District information
- Superintendent: Helen McGregor
- Schools: 111
- Budget: $735 million

Students and staff
- Students: 52,428 (2023–24)
- Staff: 7,000

Other information
- Website: www.vsb.bc.ca

The Vancouver School Board (VSB), officially the Board of Education of School District No. 39 (Vancouver), is a school district based in Vancouver, British Columbia, Canada. A board of nine elected trustees governs this school district that serves the city of Vancouver and the University Endowment Lands.

== Board of education ==
Vancouver Board of Education

Type
- Type: Unicameral

Leadership
- Chair: Suzie Mah, COPE since 2026
- Vice-chair: Steve Cardwell, OneCity since 2026

Structure
- Seats: 9 trustees; 1 student trustee (non-voting)
- Political groups: COPE (4) OneCity (3) Green (2)

Elections
- Voting system: Plurality at-large voting
- Last election: October 17, 2026
- Next election: October 19, 2030

Website
- www.vsb.bc.ca/board-of-education

Constitution
- School Act

The Vancouver Board of Education is composed of nine elected trustees and a non-voting student trustee. Trustees of the Vancouver School Board are elected under an at-large system.

=== Board composition as of 2026 ===
In October 2026, during the 2026 Vancouver municipal election, the following trustees were elected:

Name	Party
Rory Brown	OneCity
Steve Cardwell (vice-chair)	OneCity
Melanie Cheng	COPE
Gwen Giesbriecht	COPE
Derek O'Keefe	COPE
Suzie Mah (chair)	COPE
Alisha Masongsong	Green
Krista Sigurdson	OneCity
Julie Strilesky	Green
Freddie Zhang	Student trustee

=== Past composition ===
VSB trustee elections take place during municipal elections in British Columbia. Since 2014, officials including school board trustees have been elected to four-year terms. Between 1990 and 2011, municipal official were elected to three-year terms. Between 1940 and 1988, municipal official were elected to two-year terms.

On May 6, 1985, provincial education minister Jack Heinrich issued letters of dismissal to all trustees elected in the 1984 election for refusal to submit a budget that comply with spending limits imposed by the Social Credit government. In the subsequent election held on January 30, 1986, COPE trustee candidate won every seats on the board.

On October 17, 2016, the trustees elected in the 2014 election were all removed by provincial Education Minister Mike Bernier for failing to pass a balanced budget. A by-election was held on October 14, 2017, for all vacated trustee seats.

Former Prime Minister Kim Campbell was elected to the board in the 1980 election while she was attending law school at University of British Columbia. She contested the 1983 provincial election as a British Columbia Social Credit Party candidate while serving as Vancouver board chair. (She and her running mate, the future Vancouver Mayor Philip Owen, lost badly to the NDP incumbents in the dual-member electoral district of Vancouver Centre.)

Timeline of elections to the school board since 1966.

Term	Chair								
Term	Chair	NPA	COPE	NDP	Green	Vision	OneCity	ABC	Independent
1980–1982	Pauline Weinstein	3	5	—	—	—	—	—	1
1982–1984	Kim Campbell	5	3	—	—	—	—	—	1
1984–1985	Pauline Weinstein	4	5	—	—	—	—	—	—
1985–1986	Board vacated by the Minister of Education			—	—	—	—	—	—
1986	Pauline Weinstein	0	9	—	—	—	—	—	—
1986–1988	Ken Denike	7	2	—	—	—	—	—	—
1988–1990	Bill Brown	7	1	1	—	—	—	—	—
1990–1993	Ian Kelsey	6	2	1	—	—	—	—	—
1993–1996	Ken Denike / Carol McRae	7	2	—	—	—	—	—	—
1996–1999	John Cheng / Bill Brown	9	0	—	0	—	—	—	—
1999–2002	Bill Brown / Barbara Buchanan	6	3	—	0	—	—	—	—
2002–2005	Adrienne Montani	1	7	—	1	—	—	—	—
2005–2008	Ken Denike	6	3	—	0	—	—	—	—
2008–2011	Patti Bacchus	2	3	—	—	4	—	—	—
2011–2014	Patti Bacchus	3	1	—	0	5	—	—	—
2014–2016	Christopher Richardson	4	1	—	0	4	—	—	—
2016–2017	Board vacated by the Minister of Education			—	—	—	—	—	—
2017–2018	Janet Fraser	2	0	—	3	3	1	—	—
2018–2022	Janet Fraser	3	1	—	3	1	1		—
2022–2026	Victoria Jung	0	1	—	2		1	5	—
		NPA	COPE	NDP	Green	Vision	OneCity	ABC	Independent

=== List of trustees (since 1984) ===
Non-Partisan Association (NPA)
Coalition of Progressive Electors (COPE)
Vancouver Civic NDP

Vision Vancouver
Green Party of Vancouver

ABC Vancouver
OneCity Vancouver

Term	Trustee	Trustee	Trustee	Trustee	Trustee	Trustee	Trustee	Trustee	Trustee
1984–1985	Jonathan Baker	Ken Denike	Bill Brown	Graeme Waymar	John Church	Gary Onstad	Carmela Allevato	Pauline Weinstein	Phil Rankin
1986	Chris Allnutt	Bill Darnell	Sadie Kuehnn	Charles Ungerleider	John Church	Gary Onstad	Carmela Allevato	Pauline Weinstein	Phil Rankin
1986–1988	Harkirpal Sara	Ken Denike	Bill Brown	Graeme Waymark	Carol McRae	Marina Navin	Robert Poburko	Bryan Hannay	Phil Rankin
1988–1990	Harkirpal Sara	Ken Denike	Bill Brown	Ian Kelsey	Carol McRae	Marina Navin	Anne Beer	Craig Hemer	Pauline Weinstein
1990–1993	John Cheng	Ken Denike	Bill Brown	Ian Kelsey	Bill Bruneau	Gary Onstad	Anne Beer	Craig Hemer	Ruth Herman
1993–1996	John Cheng	Ken Denike	Bill Brown	Ted Hunt	Carol McRea	Yvonne Brown	John Robertson	Sandy McCormick	Anne Roberts
1996–1999	John Cheng	Ken Denike	Bill Brown	Ted Hunt	Barbara Buchanan	Bill Yuen	John Robertson	Sandy McCormick	Mary Salvino Kambas
1999–2002	John Cheng	Ken Denike	Bill Brown	Ted Hunt	Barbara Buchanan	Bill Yuen	Allan Wong	Allen Blakey	Adrienne Montani
2002–2005	John Cheng	Andrea Reimer	Jane Bouey	Kevin Millsip	Angela Kenyon	Noel Herron	Allan Wong	Allen Blakey	Adrienne Montani
2005–2008	Shirley Wong	Ken Denike	Eleanor Gregory	Don Lee	Carol Gibson	Clarence Hansen	Allan Wong	Allen Blakey	Sharon Gregson
2008–2011	Jane Bouey	Ken Denike	Patti Bacchus	Mike Lombardi	Carol Gibson	Ken Clement	Allan Wong	Allen Blakey	Sharon Gregson
2011–2014	Fraser Ballantyne	Ken Denike	Patti Bacchus	Mike Lombardi	Sophia Woo	Ken Clement	Allan Wong	Rob Wynen	Cherie Payne
2014–2016	Fraser Ballantyne	Christopher JK Richardson	Patti Bacchus	Mike Lombardi	Stacy Robertson	Penny Noble	Allan Wong	Janet Fraser	Joy Alexander
2017–2018	Fraser Ballantyne	Lisa Dominato	Judy Zaichkowsky	Carrie Bercic	Estrellita Gonzalez	Ken Clement	Allan Wong	Janet Fraser	Joy Alexander
2018–2022	Fraser Ballantyne	Oliver Hanson	Carmen Cho	Jennifer Reddy	Estrellita Gonzalez	Lois Chan-Pedley	Allan Wong	Janet Fraser	Barb Parrott
2022–2026	Alfred Chien	Christopher JK Richardson	Preeti Faridkot	Jennifer Reddy	Victoria Jung	Lois Chan-Pedley	Josh Zhang	Janet Fraser	Suzie Mah

== Demographics ==
The Vancouver school district is a large, urban and multicultural school district. As of 2019, the district provides programs to 54,000 students in kindergarten to grade 12, as well as over 2,000 adults in adult education programs.

In 2014, there were 1,473 international students in Vancouver public schools.

== Seismic upgrading ==
The Ministry of Education launched a seismic upgrading program in March 2005 to upgrade schools all over British Columbia. The program is quoted to cost a total of $1.5 billion. The following schools in the Vancouver School Board are supported to proceed with seismic mitigation in 2015: Killarney Secondary, David Thompson Secondary, Maple Grove Elementary, Lord Tennyson Elementary, Dr. Annie B. Jamieson Elementary, Eric Hamber Secondary, Point Grey Secondary, Renfrew Community Elementary, Sir Alexander Mackenzie Elementary, Waverley Elementary, Edith Cavell Elementary, Prince of Wales Secondary, Templeton Secondary, General Wolf Elementary, David Lloyd George Elementary, and Bayview Community Elementary.

== Elementary schools ==
- Admiral Seymour
- Bayview
- Britannia Elementary
- Captain James Cook Elementary
- Carnarvon
- Champlain Heights
- Charles Dickens
- Chief Maquinna
- David Livingstone
- David Lloyd George
- David Oppenheimer
- Dr. A.R. Lord
- Dr. Annie B. Jamieson
- Dr. George M. Weir
- Dr. H.N. MacCorkindale
- Dr. R.E. McKechnie
- Edith Cavell
- Elsie Roy
- Emily Carr
- False Creek
- Florence Nightingale
- General Brock
- General Gordon Elementary School
- General Wolfe
- George T. Cunningham
- Graham D Bruce
- Grandview ʔuuqinak’uuh
- Grenfell
- Hastings
- Henry Hudson
- J.W. Sexsmith
- John Henderson
- John Norquay
- Jules Quesnel
- Kerrisdale Elementary School
- L'Ecole Bilingue
- Laura Secord
- Lord Beaconsfield
- Lord Kitchener
- Lord Nelson
- Lord Roberts
- Lord Selkirk
- Lord Strathcona
- Lord Tennyson
- Maple Grove
- Mount Pleasant
- Nootka
- Norma Rose Point School
- Pierre Elliott Trudeau Elementary School
- Queen Alexandra
- Queen Elizabeth
- Queen Mary
- Queen Victoria Annex
- Quilchena
- Renfrew
- Shaughnessy
- Simon Fraser
- Sir Alexander Mackenzie
- Sir Charles Kingsford-Smith
- Sir Guy Carleton
- Sir James Douglas
- Sir John Franklin Elementary School
- wek̓ʷan̓əs tə syaqʷəm (formerly named Sir Matthew Begbie)
- Sir Richard McBride
- Sir Sandford Fleming Elementary School
- Sir Wilfred Grenfell
- Sir Wilfrid Laurier
- Sir William Osler
- Sir William Van Horne
- Southlands
- šxʷwəq̓ʷəθət Crosstown Elementary
- Tecumseh
- Thunderbird šxʷəxʷaʔəs
- Trafalgar
- Tyee
- University Hill Elementary
- Vancouver Learning Network Elementary
- Walter Moberly
- Waverley
- χpey̓ Elementary (formerly named Sir William MacDonald from 1906–2017)

=== David Lloyd George Elementary School ===
David Lloyd George Elementary School is an elementary school in the Marpole neighbourhood. It holds approximately 427 students in grades K through 7. The school opened in 1921 and was named after David Lloyd George, the British prime minister from 1916 to 1922. The sports teams are called the DLG Hornets and wear purple.

=== David Oppenheimer Elementary School ===
David Oppenheimer Elementary School opened in 1959 and was named after one of the early mayors of the city, David Oppenheimer. It is located at 2421 Scarboro Avenue, in the Victoria-Fraserview neighbourhood. As of 2016, the school principal is Rosie Finch; the school's sports teams are called the Orcas.

=== General Gordon Elementary School ===
General Gordon Elementary School is an elementary school that opened in 1912. It was named for British general Charles George Gordon, who was killed at Khartoum in January 1885. It is located at 2268 Bayswater Street. In September 2008, it was selected as one of three schools in a pilot provincially supported "Neighbourhoods of Learning" program.

=== Lord Tennyson Elementary School ===
Lord Tennyson Elementary School is a French immersion school opened in 1912, named after 19th-century British poet Alfred Tennyson, The 1st Baron Tennyson. It is located at 1936 West 10th Avenue. As of 2026, the school principal is Sonja Rondestvedt. Lord Tennyson is a feeder school for Kitsilano Secondary School, where graduates can continue their education in French Immersion.

=== Nootka Elementary School ===
Nootka Elementary School opened in 1959 as Lord Beaconsfield Annex, but a growing student population led to school status being granted in 1963. It is located at 3375 Nootka Street. As of 2025, the current school principal is Scott Hughes and the vice-principal is Amrit Hundal.

=== Queen Alexandra Elementary School ===
Queen Alexandra Elementary School opened in 1909 and was named for Alexandra of Denmark. It is located at 1300 East Broadway, at the intersection with Clark Drive. It is near Vancouver Community College's Broadway campus, and is easily accessible from VCC–Clark station and Commercial–Broadway station on the SkyTrain. As of 2018, the school principal is John MacCormack.

=== Queen Mary Elementary School ===
Queen Mary Elementary School opened in 1915. It is located at 2000 Trimble Street at 4th Avenue in the West Point Grey neighbourhood. As of 2020, the school principal is Megan Davies. The school has a population of about 450 students from grade K-7. Queen Mary Elementary School is on a hill close to Locarno Beach. It has two buildings, a gravel field and two playgrounds. The main red building was a former town hall for the city of Vancouver. It is named for Queen Mary, the wife of George V.

=== Shaughnessy Elementary School ===
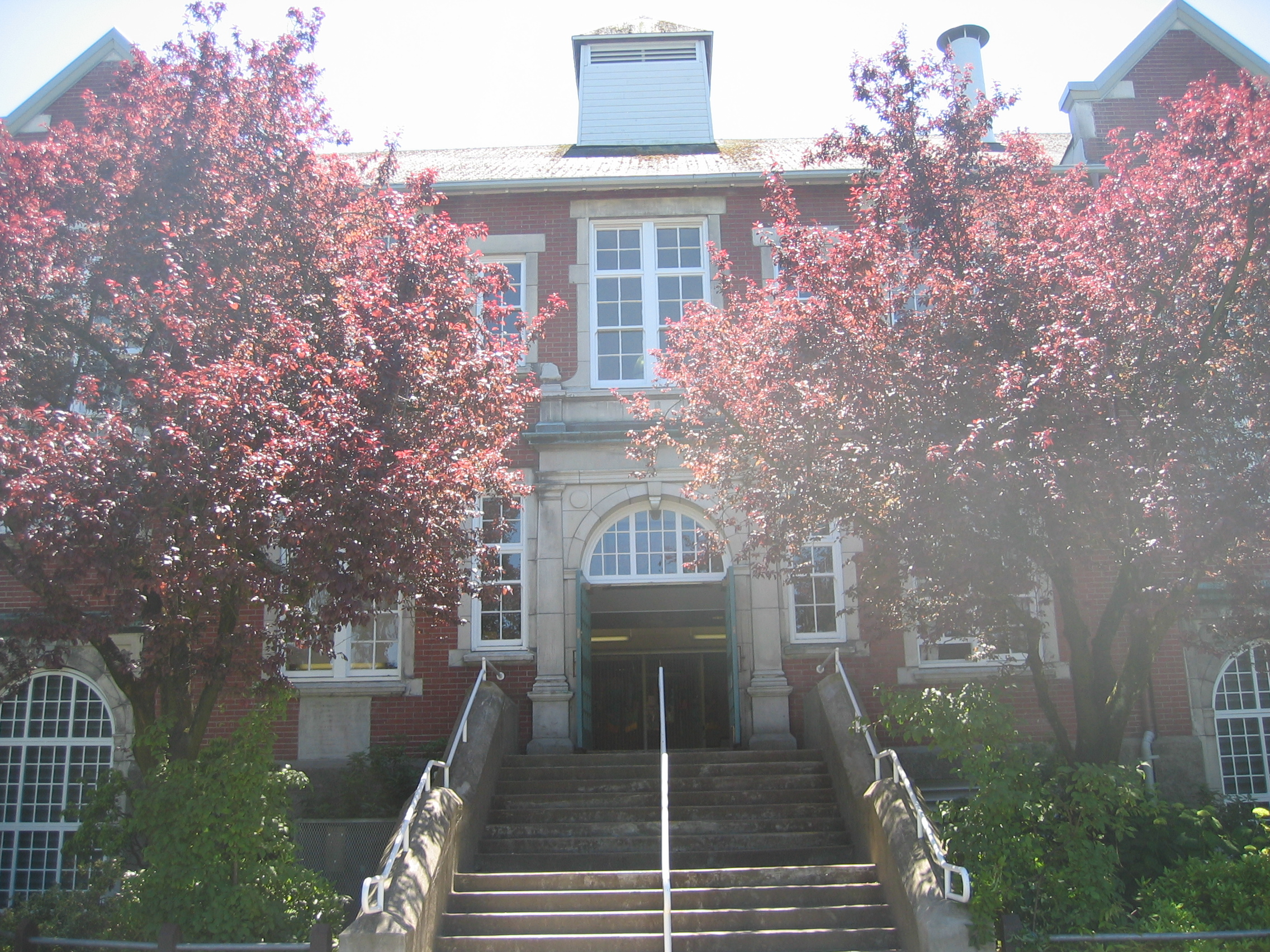
Shaughnessy Elementary School

Shaughnessy Elementary School opened in 1920 as Prince of Wales Elementary and Secondary School. In 1960, the current Prince of Wales Secondary School was opened nearby, and the school was renamed after the surrounding Shaughnessy neighbourhood. The school is located at 4250 Marguerite Street, near King Edward Avenue and Granville Street.

=== Sir Richard McBride Elementary School ===
Sir Richard McBride Elementary School opened in 1911, named after 19th-century politician Richard McBride. It is located at 1300 East 29th Avenue, near Knight Street. The school was built on a hill near a nursery and orchard known as Henry's Farm. As of 2024, the current school principal is Carrie Sleep.

=== χpey̓ Elementary School ===
χpey̓ Elementary opened in 1906 as Sir William Macdonald Elementary School in honour of the Canadian tobacco manufacturer and major education philanthropist. Macdonald was unofficially rechristened "χpey̓" on October 24, 2017, following a 2-year VSB initiative to rename the school to better reflect "the Indigenous heritage and education history of the area" as well as "the District Aboriginal Focus School program". The name, which means "cedar" in the henqeminem dialect of the Musqueam nation, was nominated by Chief Wayne Sparrow and Musqueam council members. The change became official following a Musqueam renaming ceremony on June 1, 2018. Because of its low enrolment and high seismic risk, χpey̓ was shortlisted for closure in 2015, but Vancouver City Council elected to keep it open until at least 2020. χpey̓ is located at 1959 East Hastings Street in East Vancouver's Grandview-Woodland area, but since becoming a First Nations focus school in 2012, its catchment area has switched from local to district.

=== List of elementary annexes ===
- Champlain Heights Annex
- Charles Dickens Annex
- Collingwood Neighbourhood (Bruce Annex)
- Garibaldi Annex (Nelson Annex)
- Henderson Annex (not enrolling since September 2016.)
- Kerrisdale Annex
- Maquinna Annex (not enrolling since September 2015.)
- McBride Annex
- Queen Elizabeth Annex (Jules Quesnel Annex)
- Queen Victoria (Secord Annex)
- Roberts Annex
- Selkirk Annex
- Sir James Douglas Annex
- Sir Wilfrid Laurier Annex (not enrolling since September 2016.)
- Tecumseh Annex
- Tillicum Annex (Hastings Annex)

== Secondary schools ==
The VSB operates 18 secondary schools within Vancouver and the University Endowment Lands. Secondary schools in the district begin at Grade 8 and continue to Grade 12, where students graduate with their Dogwood Diploma.

List of secondary schools
School name	Capacity	Enrolment (2025)	% Capacity	Notes
Britannia	1,025	559	55%	
David Thompson	1,550	1,410	91%	
Eric Hamber	1,700	1,750	103%	
Gladstone	1,600	936	59%	
John Oliver	1,700	1,094	64%	
Killarney	2,200	1,791	81%	
King George	375	538	143%	
Kitsilano	1,500	1,532	102%	
Lord Byng	1,200	1,068	89%	
Magee	1,200	857	71%	
Point Grey stəywəte:n̓	1,050	816	78%	
Prince of Wales	1,100	936	85%	
Sir Charles Tupper	1,500	1,214	81%	
Sir Winston Churchill	1,850	1,918	104%	
Templeton	1,400	797	57%	
University Hill	950	785	83%	
Vancouver Learning Network – Secondary	—N/a			VLN is an online school
Vancouver Technical	1,700	1,725	101%	
Windermere	1,500	895	60%	

== Alternative program education sites ==
- 8J/9J Program
- Aries Program
- Byng Satellite Program (closed 2010)
- Cedar Walk Program
- East Side Program
- Epic Program
- Foundations program
- Genesis Broadway
- Genesis North East
- Genesis South
- Hamber House Adolescent Day Treatment program
- Outreach Program
- Pinnacle Program
- Streetfront Program
- Sunrise East Program
- Take A Hike Program
- The West Program
- Total Education Program
- Tupper Young Parents Alternative Program
- Vinery Program
- Waverley Annex Learning Hub – Spectrum
- West Coast Alternative Program

== Special programs ==
- The University Transition Program is an early university entrance program to the University of British Columbia. Students of this program have access to most UBC facilities and also possess UBC ID cards.
- TREK Outdoor Education Program
- International Baccalaureate programs at Britannia Secondary School and Sir Winston Churchill Secondary School
- City School
- Aboriginal Education

=== Mini-schools ===
Mini-schools are enriched programs for highly motivated students. Mini-schools begin at grade 8, with approximately 500 total spots available. Each year over 1400 students apply for mini-schools, with admission based on district assessment results, grade 6 and 7 report cards, applications, and interviews.

Mini-schools in the district include:

- Britannia Hockey Academy
- Britannia Venture Program
- Byng Arts Mini School
- David Thompson Odyssey Program
- Gladstone Mini School
- Hamber Challenge Studio Program
- Ideal Mini School
- John Oliver Digital Immersion Mini School
- Killarney Mini School
- King George Mini School
- Magee SPARTS
- Point Grey Mini School
- Prince of Wales Mini School
- Synergy at Churchill
- Templeton Mini School
- Tupper Mini School
- Vancouver Technical Flex Humanities Program
- Vancouver Technical Summit Program
- Windermere Leadership

== Transgender policy ==
In June 2014, the Vancouver School Board adopted a new policy regarding transgender children. It intends to support transgender and LGBTQ in allowing them be called by the name they identify with. They will also be able to use whichever washroom they feel most comfortable in.
