= David Thompson Secondary School (Vancouver) =

Public secondary school in Vancouver, British Columbia

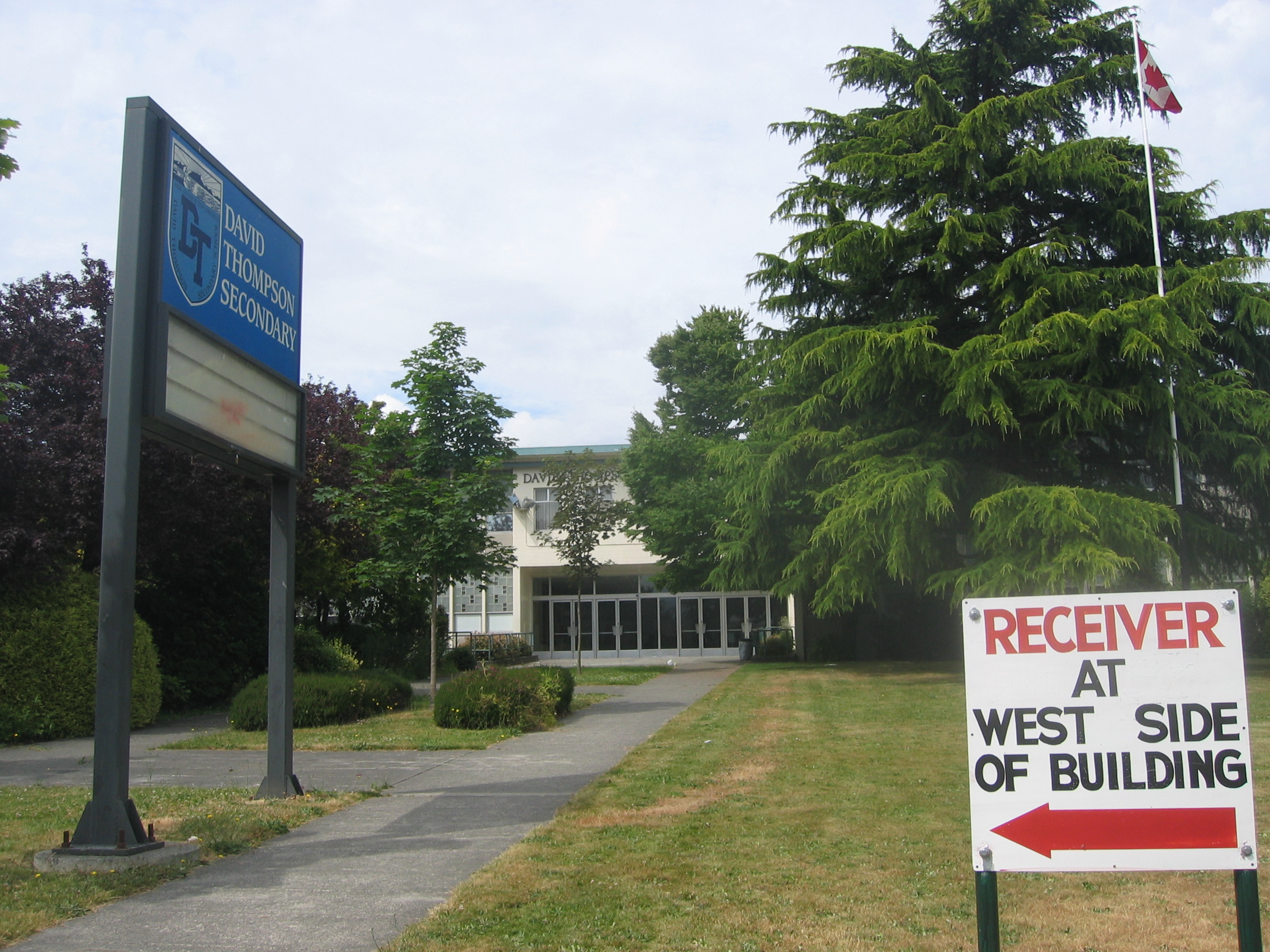

Location
- 1755 East 55th Avenue; Vancouver, British Columbia, V5P 1Z7; Canada; 49°13′14″N 123°04′13″W

Information
- School type: Public, Secondary School
- Motto: Latin: Nos Quoque Exploremus (Let Us Also Explore)
- Founded: 1958
- School board: School District 39 Vancouver
- Superintendent: Helen McGregor
- Area trustee: Janet Fraser
- School number: 3939018
- Director: Ranjit Bains
- Principal: Nick Akrap
- Grades: 8-12
- Enrollment: 1,417 (2025-2026)
- Language: English
- Area: Victoria-Fraserview
- Colours: Blue and Light Blue
- Team name: Thompson Trojans
- Website: thompson.vsb.bc.ca

David Thompson Secondary School is a public secondary school located in the Fraserview neighbourhood of central Vancouver, British Columbia, Canada. It was opened in 1958.

== History ==
David Thompson Secondary School opened in the fall of 1958. From September to November when the opening occurred, students attended three other local schools: Gladstone, John Oliver, and Killarney. During the first year, 1500 students were enrolled and the first class graduated in 1960. Enrolment gradually increased, and by the mid-1970s the average annual student population was in excess of two thousand.

=== The Twilight Saga filming ===
In the spring of 2009, David Thompson was used as the set for Forks High School in The Twilight Saga: New Moon, the second installment of the Twilight film series. That summer, the third installment (The Twilight Saga: Eclipse) was also filmed at the school.

== Athletics ==
In 1960, the senior boys' rugby team won the provincial New Zealand Shield in competition. In 1967 and 1968, the senior boys' basketball teams were the Lower Mainland champions. In the 1960s, the school colours were purple and gold, changed years later to blue and light blue.

== Notable alumni ==
- Kayi Cheung, winner of Miss Hong Kong 2007
- Ronald Deibert (class of 1982), professor and director of the University of Toronto's Citizen Lab
- Andrea Jin (class of 2014), Juno Award-winning comedian
- Dan Kesa, former professional ice hockey player
- Sasha Lakovic (class of 1990), former professional ice hockey and roller hockey player
- Annie Liu, Hong Kong actress
- Hargurnek Sandhu, two-time Olympic field hockey player in the 1984 and 1988 Games, and assistant coach for the 2008 Beijing Games
- Laurie Shong (class of 1989), former Olympic fencer and pentathlete
- Megan Wing, former Olympic figure skater
