= William D. Cuts Junior High School =

Location
- 149 Larose Drive; St. Albert, Alberta; Canada; 53°38′53″N 113°38′40″W

Information
- Opened: 1977
- School district: St. Albert Public Schools
- Principal: Cory Albrecht
- Grades: 7-9
- Colors: Green and Yellow
- Mascot: Crusader
- Feeder schools: Bellerose Composite High School
- Website: wdcuts.spschools.org

William D. Cuts Junior High School is a public middle school located in St. Albert, Alberta. Constructed in 1977, the single-story brick structure has over 500 students. It is also home to a vibrant Rec Academy as well as a Hockey Academy.
