= Victoria–Fraserview =

- Neighbourhood
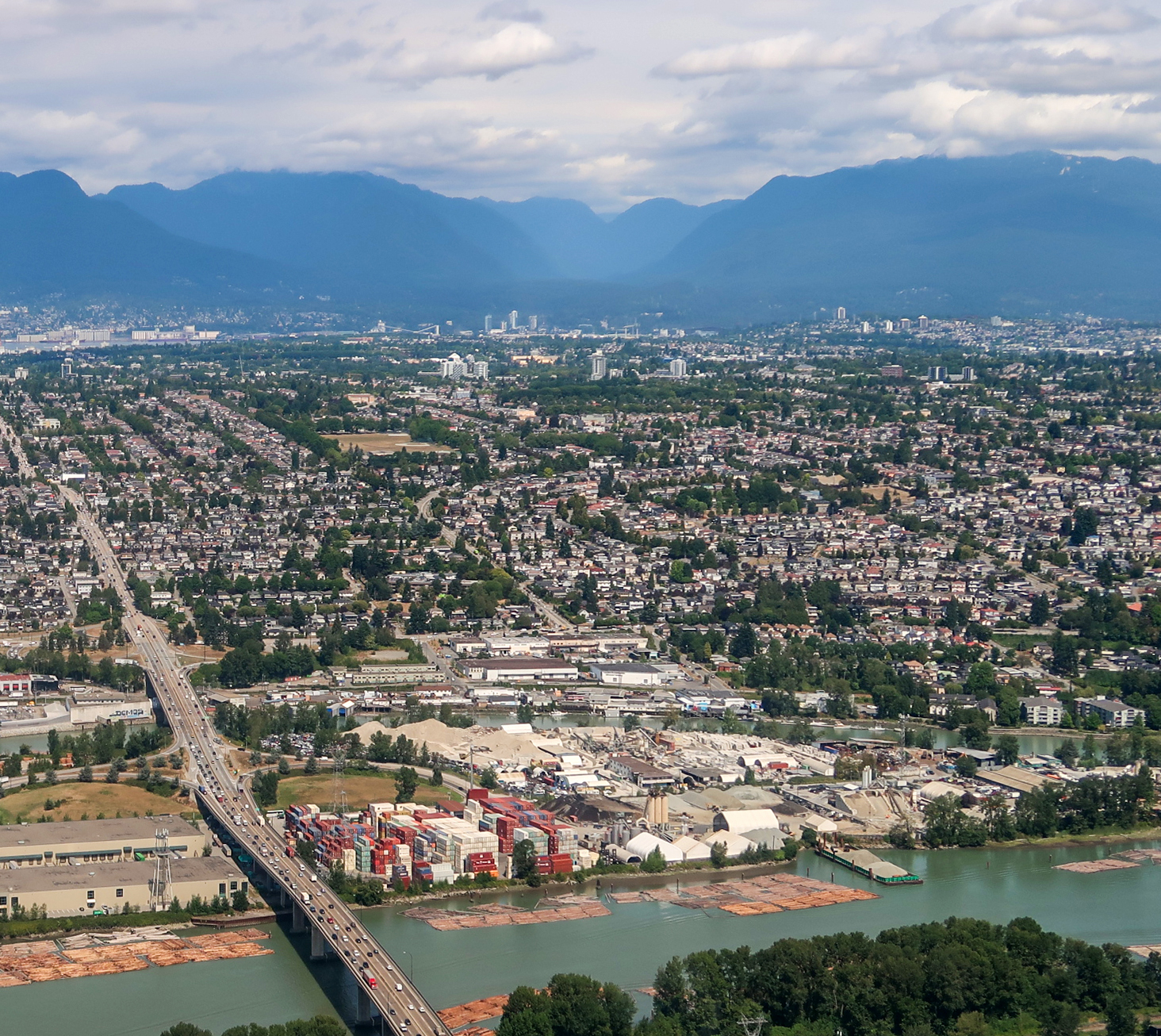
- Aerial view of Victoria–Fraserview in 2025

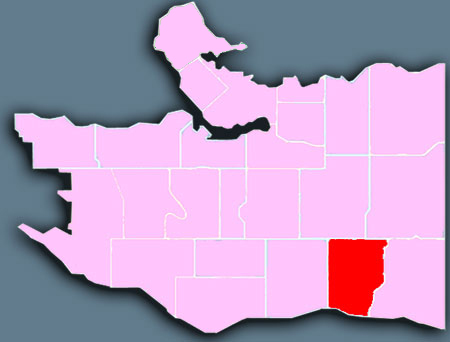
- Location of Victoria–Fraserview in Vancouver

- Location in Metro Vancouver
- Coordinates: 49.218°N 123.066°W
- Country: Canada
- Province: British Columbia
- City: Vancouver

Area
  - Total: 5.31 km^{2} (2.05 sq mi)

Population
  - Total: 31,065
  - Density: 5,850.2/km^{2} (15,152/sq mi)

Victoria–Fraserview is a neighbourhood in the City of Vancouver, set on the south slope of the rise that runs north from the Fraser River and encompassing a large area of residential and commercial development. Surrounding the culturally eclectic Victoria Drive corridor, Victoria–Fraserview is an ethnically diverse area that was one of the earliest areas of settlement in the region.

== Geography ==
Stretching north from the Fraser River to East 41st Avenue, Victoria–Fraserview is bordered on the west by Knight Street, one of Vancouver's busiest north–south corridors and on the east by a line including Elliott Street and Vivian Drive. It is on a south-facing slope that looks over the Fraser River and Mitchell Island towards Richmond and Delta. Much of the commercial development in the neighbourhood is focused along Victoria Drive, which features a range of ethnic shops and services.

The neighbourhood is dominated by single-family residences, but some townhomes can be found throughout the area. Along the Fraser River, a portion of the development known as the Fraserlands has brought condominia and other residential construction to former industrial lands.

== History ==
Musqueam First Nations tradition is indicating that the flats along the Fraser River in the southwestern portion of Victoria–Fraserview was the site of an important village and a number of east–west trails leading towards settlements in what is now New Westminster. The first European settlers arrived in the 1860s, and a wagon road constructed in 1875 to the west of Knight Street on what is now Fraser Street opened the vast acres of virgin forest to homesteaders. As part of the Municipality of South Vancouver, Victoria–Fraserview began to receive more attention from farmers who cleared land in the region. It became part of the city of Vancouver in 1929.

Much of the existing development in the neighbourhood came in the 1940s, when land was needed for returning veterans of World War II. 1,100 new homes were built in the area (and its neighbour to the west, Sunset) for these veterans, on land expropriated by the Canadian Mortgage and Housing Corporation despite protestations of neighbours.

In the early days of settlement, the floodplain along the Fraser River was popular with small vegetable farmers, but later was taken over by industrial development along the working river. Since the 1980s, industrial land has slowly transformed to residential properties.

== Demographics ==
Panethnic groups in the Victoria–Fraserview neighbourhood (2001−2016)
Panethnic group	2016		2006		2001	
Panethnic group	Pop.	%	Pop.	%	Pop.	%
East Asian (Note: Statistic includes total responses of "Chinese", "Korean", and "Japanese" under visible minority section on census.)	16,125	53.33%	16,210	56.29%	14,630	55.19%
Southeast Asian (Note: Statistic includes total responses of "Filipino" and "Southeast Asian" under visible minority section on census.)	4,620	15.28%	2,925	10.16%	2,590	9.77%
European (Note: Statistic includes all persons that did not make up part of a visible minority or an indigenous identity.)	4,390	14.52%	5,380	18.68%	5,885	22.2%
South Asian	3,080	10.19%	2,825	9.81%	2,260	8.53%
Latin American	470	1.55%	520	1.81%	370	1.4%
Indigenous	385	1.27%	225	0.78%	275	1.04%
African	250	0.83%	115	0.4%	155	0.58%
Middle Eastern (Note: Statistic includes total responses of "West Asian" and "Arab" under visible minority section on census.)	155	0.51%	190	0.66%	110	0.41%
Other/Multiracial (Note: Statistic includes total responses of "Visible minority, n.i.e." and "Multiple visible minorities" under visible minority section on census.)	770	2.55%	395	1.37%	250	0.94%
Total responses	30,235	97.33%	28,795	98.61%	26,510	97.64%
Total population	31,065	100%	29,200	100%	27,150	100%
Note: Totals greater than 100% due to multiple origin responses

== Features ==
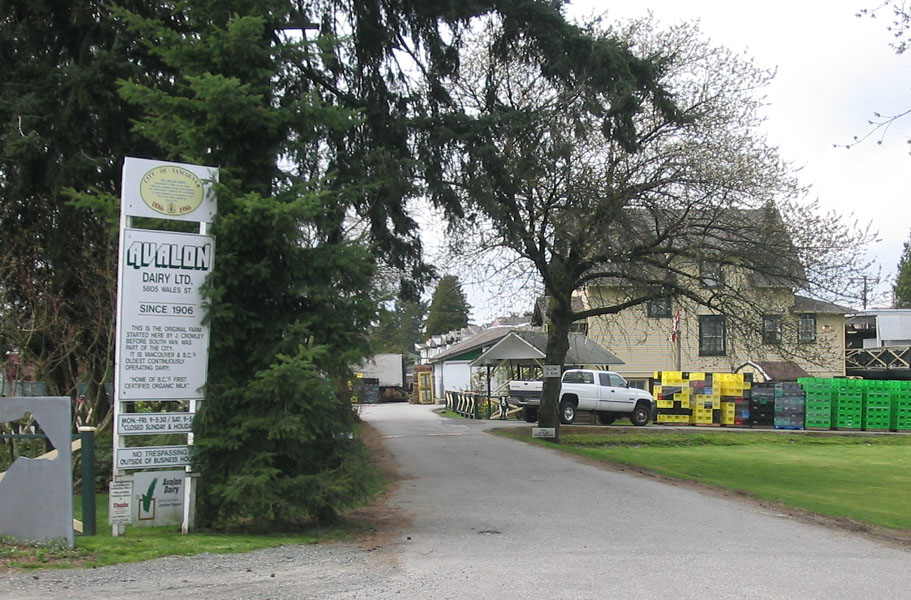
The Avalon Dairy is the longest continuously operating dairy in British Columbia.

While Victoria–Fraserview was populated early in the city's development, it does not have many existing heritage buildings, but one remains as a unique site in a metropolitan city, the Avalon Dairy. Started in 1906 by Jeremiah Crowley, the Avalon Dairy started with six cows and grew into the longest-running dairy operation in British Columbia and is still run by the Crowley family. In 2011, Lee Crowley, the current owner of Avalonian Dairy and grandson of founder Jeremiah Crowley, moved the business to a new bottling facility in nearby Burnaby and sold the 1.25-acre farm property to a local Killarney-area development company.

Avalonna Homes has applied to the City of Vancouver for rezoning permits to allow them to build around 60 townhouse units on the site and renovate the heritage house.

Victoria–Fraserview contains eight parks and a number of walking trails along the Fraser River. The Fraserview branch of Vancouver Public Library is located on Argyle Drive, within walking distance of David Thompson Secondary School and Humm Park.
