= University Transition Program =

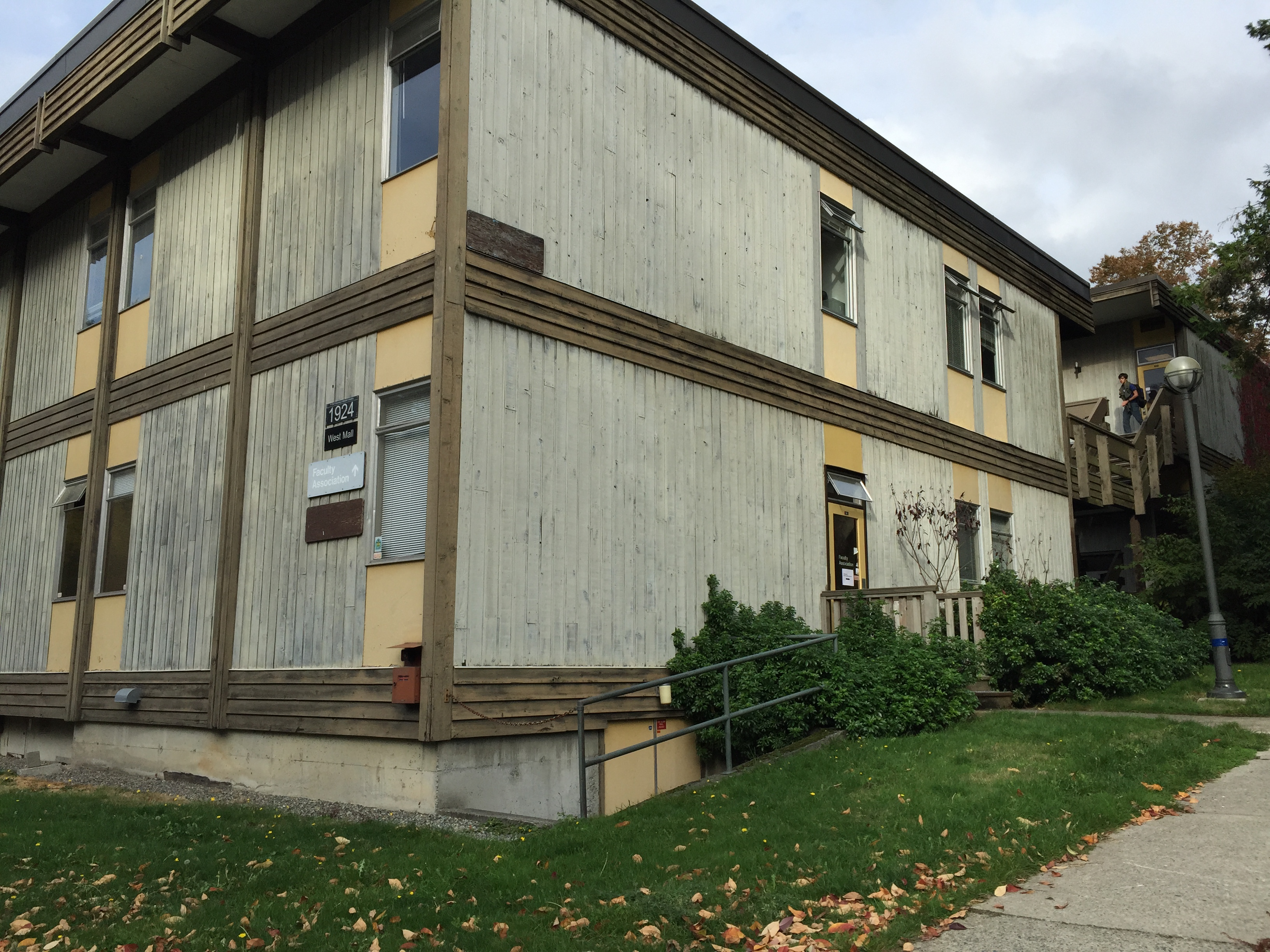
- University Transition Program, building (visible on the far right of image), Oct 2014

Location
- 240D - 1924 West Mall; Vancouver, British Columbia, V6T1Z2; Canada

Information
- Established: 1993
- School board: School District 39 Vancouver
- School number: 03995051
- Grades: 11–12
- Enrollment: 40 (September 2022)
- Language: English
- Area: Vancouver, British Columbia
- Website: transitionprogramforgiftedstudents.ca

The Transition Program for Gifted Students, often called the University Transition Program (UTP), is an accelerated secondary school program for gifted students funded by the BC Ministry of Education's Provincial Resource Program with hosting, educational support and financial assistance from the University of British Columbia (UBC), and administered by the Vancouver School Board in Vancouver, British Columbia, Canada. Each year, the program accepts around 20 new students between the ages 12 and 15, half of which are from outside the Vancouver School Board. Over the course of two years, students complete required five year high school curriculum along with some university coursework. When they graduate from the program, the students are usually accepted into UBC earlier than they would if they had graduated from a regular high school (aged 14–16 instead of 18–19).

== Location ==
The University Transition Program (UTP) is located within the University of British Columbia, in the Auditorium Annex located on West Mall. It is above the Math Graduates office, across from the Pacific Institute of Mathematical Sciences building, and behind the Walter C. Koerner Library.

== Program ==
Initiated by Daria Danylchuk in 1993 by the Vancouver School Board in partnership with the Office of the President of The University of British Columbia and subsequently funded as a BC Provincial Resource Program by the BC Ministry of Education in 1995, the University Transition Program designed a radical academic acceleration preparation for early entrance to university studies for BC adolescents in accordance with the BC Special Education Policy for students whose asynchronous educational and developmental needs exceed available services in regular classrooms. Program design was refined in consultation with local, national and international researchers and education specialists, most notably Dr. Nancy Robinson and Dr. Kate Noble, respectively Founder and Director of the Transition School at the University of Washington, Seattle. The Program evolved through outstanding leadership from VSB and UBC as well as from parents and the students. Courtesy of the Office of the UBC President, the Program relocated to several classrooms nestled on the second floor of the Auditorium Annex B on the UBC campus in 1998 therein promoting a pre-university identity, career and university course explorations and access to diverse UBC facilities with the privilege of a UBC student card for access to UBC libraries.

== Suspension ==
The University Transition Program (UTP) suspended its admissions for the 2024/25 school year pending an external review following concerns regarding students’ mental health.

Notable alumni

- Cheng Xie, a student from UTP, won the 2014 Schulich Leader Scholarship.
- Emilie Ma, a student from UTP, won the 2021 Schulich Leader Scholarship.
- Leo Xu, a student from UTP, won the 2023 Schulich Leader Scholarship.
