= Sir Alexander Mackenzie Elementary School (St. Albert) =

Alberta elementary school

Location
- 61 Sir Winston Churchill Ave; St. Albert, Alberta, T8N 0G5; Canada; 53.62854°N 113.600667°W

Information
- School type: Public
- Founded: 1959
- School board: St. Albert Public School District No. 5565
- Principal: Dawn Rothwell
- Grades: K-6
- Enrollment: 530
- Language: English
- Website: samem.spschools.org

Sir Alexander Mackenzie Elementary School (SAM) is a school in St. Albert, Alberta, Canada, and is a part of St. Albert Public Schools. Opened in 1959, Sir Alexander Mackenzie was the first Protestant school in St. Albert, and was the first school opened by its board. It was named after Alexander Mackenzie, a Scottish explorer who crossed what is now Canada.

== Programs ==
=== Kindergarten ===
Like all elementary schools within the St. Albert Public Schools district, SAM offers a Kindergarten program for children of at least five years in age. The Kindergarten program prepares students for entrance into the first grade by developing relationship and problem solving skills, as well as providing a foundation in language, writing, and the arts.

=== Academic Challenge ===
The academic challenge program is designed for students who excel in their studies and require an additional challenge compared to what would be provided in a regular classroom setting. The program is intended for students with increased ability in areas such as abstract thought and creative thinking. The academic challenge program is offered to students in grades 4–6, and participants must be recommended to the program by the school. Qualification tests are required for entrance into the program.

== History ==
Sir Alexander Mackenzie School was the first school built by its parent school board, then known as Protestant Separate School District No. 6, and was the first Protestant school in St. Albert. Both the district and the school were created in order to accommodate a growing population of Protestant students in St. Albert. The school building was built in 1958 and opened for its first classes in January 1959. Its opening was originally planned for the start of the school year in September 1958, but due to disagreements between the architect of the school and the city of St. Albert's building inspectors, the building was not completed until the school year had already been underway. As a result, the school's 98 grade 1 to 7 students and nine teaching staff were forced to hold classes in the basement of the St. Albert United Church instead.

Two different sites were considered for the school: "River Lot 50," and "site 3," with the school being built on the former. The latter would eventually become the site of the district's first high school, Paul Kane. The ten acres of land that the school was to occupy was purchased at a cost of $10,000 an acre, with the total cost of the school coming to $374,243 to build.

Sir Alexander Mackenzie School was named after Sir Alexander Mackenzie, a Scottish explorer who explored much of what is now Canada. The name was chosen by submission and picked by committee, which began a tradition within the district of choosing the names of historical figures for its schools.

Until the opening of Paul Kane, the district's first high school, Sir Alexander Mackenzie hosted students up to the 11th grade. After the opening of Paul Kane, the school became an elementary-junior high school. Sir Alexander Mackenzie became an elementary school in 1973, hosting students from Kindergarten to grade 6.

An open area was added to the school in 1970, which would later be divided into a library and new classrooms.

By 1984, the school had 425 students and 32 staff members, 21 of which were teachers. As of 2018, the school has 530 students.

In 2012, Protestant Separate School District No. 6 became public at the request of the Alberta government. As a result, Sir Alexander Mackenzie is no longer a Protestant school.
