= Joseph M. Demko School =

Alberta elementary-junior high school

Coordinates: 53.6609412°N 113.6456665°W

Location
- 200 Jensen Lakes Blvd. St. Albert, Alberta, T8N 7V3; Canada

Information
- School type: Public
- Founded: 2019
- School board: St. Albert Public School District No. 5565
- Principal: Hellen Nowell
- Grades: K-9
- Enrollment: 900
- Language: English
- Team name: Stars
- Website: www.spschools.org/jmd-school

Joseph M. Demko School is a dual-track elementary-junior high school in the Jensen Lakes neighborhood in St. Albert, Alberta, Canada. The school is a member of St. Albert Public Schools. The school is named after Joseph Demko, a former teacher and superintendent of the district.

== Programs ==
Joseph M. Demko School is a dual-track school, offering courses through both the English and Logos Christian programs.

=== English ===
The English program is available to students wishing to take their core courses in English. It encourages students to take an active role in their community, and promotes building relationships and working together.

=== Logos ===
Logos is a Christian program offered within the public school system. Its curriculum is bible based, and offers to its students a "spiritually nurturing, intellectually challenging and disciplined environment." When Joseph M. Demko school opened, it began to host all students in the district who were enrolled in this program.

=== CTS ===
The school has a full Career and Technology (CTS) program.

== History ==
Joseph M. Demko School was granted funding for construction on October 8, 2014 and was planned to cost $16 million. Construction began in January 2017, and was planned to be completed for the 2018-19 school year beginning September 2018. Weather delayed the opening date to 2019.

The school was built in the Jensen Lakes neighborhood, and services 900 Kindergarten to grade 9 students from the neighborhood and surrounding areas. Construction on the school coincided with the construction of neighboring Sister Alphonse Academy, an elementary-junior high school under Greater St. Albert Roman Catholic Separate School District No.734.

The school's name was selected by its board in September 2015. It was named after Joseph Demko, a former teacher, principal, superintendent, and trustee at St. Albert Public Schools. In an announcement, the board said that it "believes that schools should be named after persons or concepts that bring honour to the school and district by representing the district's values, beliefs and commitment to students. Mr. Demko exemplifies these traits and has touched thousands of lives during his time with our district.”
