= General Wolfe Elementary School (Vancouver) =

General Wolfe Elementary
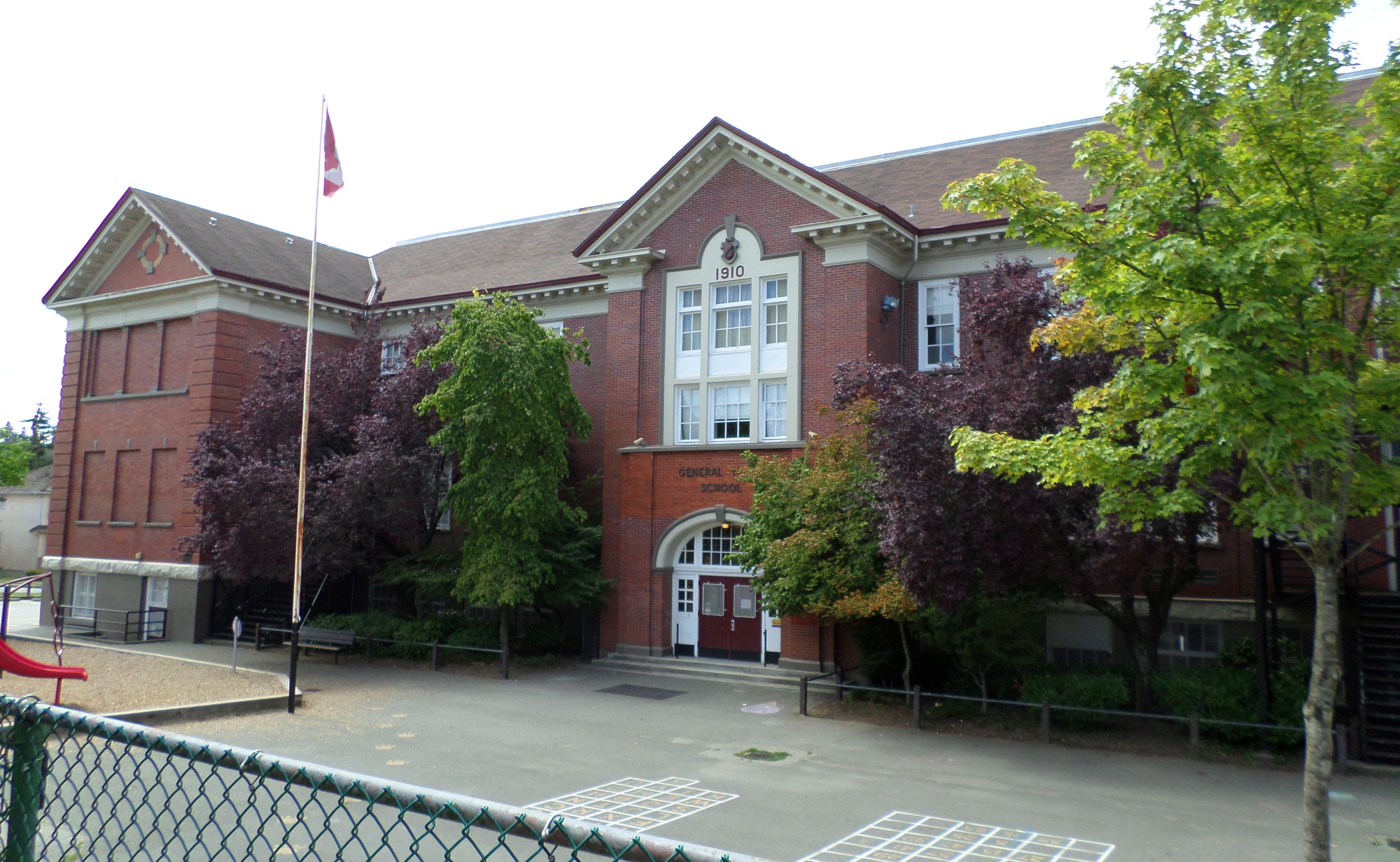
- The school in August 2016

Location
- 4251 Ontario St; Vancouver, British Columbia, V5V 3G8; Canada; 49°14′50″N 123°6′20″W

Information
- School type: Public, Elementary school
- Founded: 1910
- School board: School District 39 Vancouver
- Superintendent: Scott Robinson
- Area trustee: Janet Fraser
- School number: 3939045
- Director: Rob Schindel (Director of Instruction)
- Principal: Amber Logie
- Grades: K-7
- Enrollment: 410 (March 2008)
- Language: English
- Area: Little Mountain, Vancouver
- Colours: Yellow and black
- Mascot: Wolf
- Website: wolfe.vsb.bc.ca

General Wolfe Elementary is a public elementary school in Vancouver, British Columbia part of School District 39 Vancouver.

== History ==
General Wolfe Elementary was built in 1911. One of Wolfe's claims to fame is the boy in "Wait for Me, Daddy" photograph (of a boy reaching out towards his father in a line for war). This photo is internationally recognized, and the boy went to school at Wolfe. In 1912, two additional wings were added due to expanding population. Then in 1920 two wooden temporary buildings were built. These two buildings are still the annex and the gym today. General Wolfe used to have three portables which were used as classrooms, but when attendance dropped some in 2007, they were all eventually taken away. General Wolfe Elementary was named after General James Wolfe. During 2020–2021 there were significant upgrades to the school dubbed the seismic upgrade. The purpose of this was to make the schools walls stronger in the event of an earthquake. While the upgrades were being done the student and staff had to be relocated to a school called "South Hill Education Center" however it is often shortened to "South Hill" or "The Swing Site".

== Events ==
Traditionally, the school holds an annual "Walk-A-Thon," in which students walk, or jog laps around the school to receive prizes, to raise funds. In the 2005–2006 school year, this was cancelled for an unknown reason.

General Wolfe Elementary held a silent auction at the beginning of each year. Unfortunately, because of COVID-19 and the leadership change, Wolfe no longer holds a silent auction. The Student Council and the PAC (Parent Advisory Council) come up with more fundraisers each year and what to buy with the money produced.

Every year 2 Playdays are held in which instead of working the students freely play with peers and socialize with younger students. It follows a schedule of staying in each student classroom until recess in which they can explore the school until the end of the day.

== Code of Conduct ==
PAWS serves as the school's code of conduct as follows:

- P – Polite
- A – Accountable
- W – Welcoming
- S – Safe

The school has created a song demonstrate the use of the code of conduct which is sang to the tune of I'se the by. The chorus is below.

P is for polite you know

and A is for accountable.

W is welcoming

and S it means we're safe.

PAWS!

== Sports Teams and Other Clubs ==
General Wolfe has eight sports programs available: a Volleyball team, a Junior and Senior Basketball team, Floor hockey, Badminton, Ultimate Frisbee, Cross Country, and Track and field. General Wolfe also supports a Chess Club, Games Club, Humanitarian Club, SOGI club, Dungeons and Dragons club, a Kilometre Club, A/V crew, and a form of student council that they have named student voice.

== Divisions ==
In General Wolfe the school is divided into 16 classes each having its own assigned division number. The higher the number is the younger the students in the class are however there are some cases with split classes that lead to a division that is lower having younger students than a higher division.
