= John Oliver Secondary School =

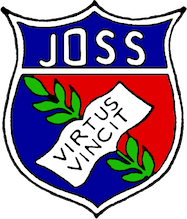

Location
- 530 East 41st Avenue; Vancouver, British Columbia, V5W 1P3; Canada; 49°13′57″N 123°5′37″W

Information
- School type: Secondary school
- Motto: "Virtus Vincit" (Courage Conquers All)
- Founded: 1912 (114 years ago)
- School board: School District 39 Vancouver
- Superintendent: Helen McGregor
- Area trustee: Christopher Richardson
- Principal: Andrew Schofield
- Grades: 8–12
- Enrollment: 926 (2025-2026)
- Language: English
- Area: Sunset
- Colours: Red and blue
- Mascot: J.O. Joker
- Team name: Jokers
- Publication: JO Canvas
- Website: johnoliver.vsb.bc.ca
- Last updated: November 2018

John Oliver Secondary School is a public secondary school located in Vancouver, British Columbia, Canada, at East 41st Avenue and Fraser Street (between the Vancouver neighbourhoods of Kensington-Cedar Cottage, Riley Park-Little Mountain and Sunset). It is named after John Oliver, the Premier of British Columbia from 1918 to 1927. The school is composed of four main segments: the main building ("A" Building) containing the bulk of the learning areas, including the Auditorium and Learning Commons; a wooden building ("B" Building) affectionately nicknamed "The Barn", due to its appearance, which is closed but was previously used by the mini school and Digital Immersion students; a Drama Studio ("C" Building) which allows for several theatre and acting courses; and a concrete building — the engineering building — bisected by a breezeway, with automotive, metal, and wood shops.

== Current ==
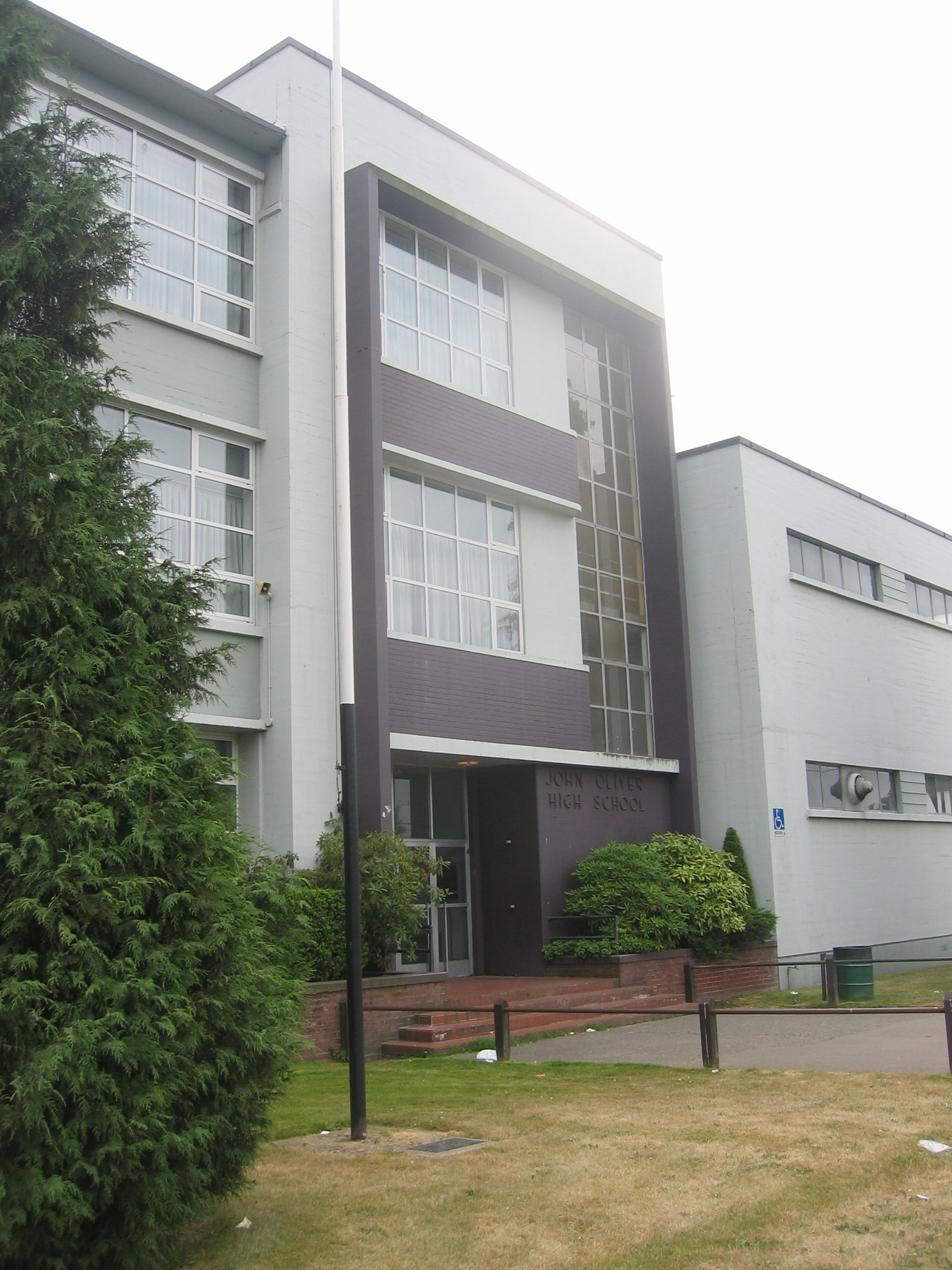
Front entrance to John Oliver Secondary School.

John Oliver Secondary is a school of approximately 926 students attending, through grades 8 to 12 with nearly 70 teachers. The students participate in many extracurricular activities including Music, Sports and Clubs.
The school has a multicultural student population, with a large number of bilingual students. Although the predominant populations are reflective of the Indo and Filipino-Canadian neighbourhood it resides in, many other ethnic backgrounds are represented in the school's population.

== History ==
The school was originally called South Vancouver High School and began in 1912 as two surplus classrooms on the grounds of Lord Selkirk Elementary at 22nd Avenue and Commercial Street. The following year, when enrolment jumped from 58 to 148, the high school students moved to General Gordon School, which is today known as Sir Sanford Fleming Elementary, located at 49th Avenue and Knight Street. Enrolment continued to increase and a site for a purpose-built high school was chosen near 41st Avenue and Fraser Street, adjacent to the South Vancouver municipal hall and fire station. South Vancouver's first, stand-alone high school was built in 1920, and was opened on January 21, 1921, by its new namesake, the Honourable John Oliver, then Premier of BC. By 1926, the enrolment of the school was over 900, and a second building with an additional 8 rooms was built to the west of the main building, on 43rd Ave. This new building, now called "The Barn", is still in existence today. The main part of the current school building was erected in 1950 on 41st Avenue, with the subsequent addition and expansion of technical studies shops, cafeteria and music wing during the following years. The original building burnt down on December 9, 1959.

== Programs and course offerings ==
- John Oliver is home to a Mini School for gifted children from grades 8–12. Twenty-eight students per year are admitted to the program. Students from across district may apply. The goal of the Mini program is to enrich students in academics (John Oliver does accelerated math), leadership (special course/responsibilities in Grade 9), and enrich education outside the classroom with three field study trips every year. Students in the John Oliver Digital Immersion Mini School take special classes each year that enrich their understanding of information technology, Chroma key techniques (and more) and their cohort has a focus on using technology to assist with advanced projects. In place of their first field trip, grade 8 students visit various high-tech institutions and corporations located within the Metro Vancouver area, such as MDA and UBC.
- John Oliver is one of two secondary schools in district which offer STEM Science/Technology/Engineering/Mathematics programs. As of September 2017, thirty students per year are accepted into a one-year program for Grade 9, and/or 10, and/or 11. Students may apply for subsequent years. Students take STEM on Day 1, working within a project-based program that covers curriculum and more for Math, Science, Electronics, IT. Day 2 they take subjects like English, Languages, PE, and other electives.
- Students in the Mini School, STEM and regular program can enter an annual science fair, with winners being able to move onto the district, regional, and ultimately the Canada-Wide Science Fair.
- John Oliver contains many classrooms in the main building equipped with home economics facilities. This allows students to take courses in various textiles, foods, cooking and pastries cafeteria, and nutrition courses.
- The school accommodates a number of full computer labs which enables students to pursue their interests in information technology in the form of CAD, animations, photography, image editing, and digital literacy courses.
- John Oliver also has a well equipped facility for the industrial arts containing several well equipped and dedicated facilities for woodworking, metalworking, and automotive technologies, enabling students to pursue their interests in various industrial disciplines.
- There is also a post secondary/apprentice program for students interested in the construction industry
- With two gymnasiums, three fields, and access to nearby Memorial Park South, John Oliver is able to offer diverse physical education courses, as well as weight training, fitness, and coaching and leadership courses.
- With a large auditorium and drama studio, as well as auxiliary facilities and band rooms, John Oliver is able to have many acting, drama, theatrical performances/programs/clubs, as well as a large choir, a beginner, intermediate and senior band. For several years, JO was the only school in the district to offer a drumline. As of September 2017, Music Director Eric Tsang added an R+B band (before school practices) to the John Oliver music offerings.

== Events and performances ==
John Oliver has hosted many events and productions annually.

- On 21 and 22 September 2012 the PAC hosted the 100th Anniversary Celebration. The event commenced with a concert in the school's auditorium featuring music and performances from the past and present as well as honouring many of the distinguished Alumni, teachers and administration over the ages. The school classrooms were decorated with images from the past and it is estimated that many of the 20,000 past students attended. On the 22nd, there were a variety of other events for the celebration, including a homecoming basketball game and a sock-hop with live music from a band of alumni.
- On May 27, 2009, John Oliver was chosen to host the 2009 Passport to Play as well the 2010 Passport to Play, a one-day event that offers students with disabilities the opportunity to learn about organizations which provide them with sports and recreational activities.
- The John Oliver Theatre Company has an annual production in which students from Drama and Acting courses, as well as the general school population, have a chance to perform in a play. Students not only have an opportunity to gain experience as actors, but as Stage Managers, make-up artists, and costume designers, among others. Students can also gain valuable technical experience by helping design and run various audio and visual effects. Previous productions include "The Brothers Grimm Spectaculathon" (2014), "The Sound of Music" (2013), and "Arsenic and Old Lace" (2012).
- John Oliver hosts an annual basketball tournament called "Joker's Classic." Held in two portions consisting of three days in the latter half of two weeks, over 16 teams compete with each other to come out on top. The girls tournament is held in the first week, with the boys tournament held afterwards. Leadership classes organize committees to handle various aspects of the tournaments, such as concession, advertising, sponsorship, audio/visual, and admission. There are a variety of team and individual awards given out, such as team placement awards, best player, and sportsmanship awards.
- To celebrate and showcase the cultural diversity of John Oliver, students hold an annual Multicultural Show where students show off their talent through performances and a fashion show.
- On or near November 11, John Oliver remembers those who fought in World War One by an annual Remembrance Day assembly. "Oh Canada" is sung, with a short skit recreating some aspect of the War following it. A trumpeter plays "The Last Post" followed by a moment of silence.
- During the first week of school, a week of special presentations are held for each grade. These help inform the grades about important topics teens should know about.
- Two or three weeks after Winter Break, John Oliver holds a week of exams. The Mid-Year exams are a bench-marker of how well students are doing, and prepares students, especially grade 8's, for End-of-Year exams. Special presentations are also held during this time for younger grades.

== Teams ==
John Oliver offers a wide variety of team sports held over the school year, usually with several separate teams for junior, senior, male, and female categories. This list is not exclusive. Teams offered are dependent on student sign up and coaches availability.

- Badminton
- Basketball
- Cross Country
- Wrestling
- Soccer
- Softball
- Track and Field
- Ultimate
- Volleyball

== Clubs ==
- Students' Council – The student government of the school.
- Bhangra Club – The Bhangra Club practices year-round and performs at school events.
- Dance Squad – The Dance Squad practices year-round and performs at school and district events.
- Destination Imagination – Destination ImagiNation is an educational program hosted by Destination ImaginNation Inc. in which student teams solve open-ended Challenges and present their solutions at Tournaments.
- Rainbow Diversity Club – The JO-Rainbows strive to create a school environment free of homophobia. Every year they hold a "Day of Silence" event, in which participating students remain verbally silent throughout the entire school day and participate in the nationwide Anti-Bullying Day, also known as Pink Day.
- Grad Committee – The Graduation Committee is in-charge of arranging all grad related activities including the prom, Dry Grad, and the School Leaving Ceremony.
- Lighting and Sound Crew (Technical Crew) - The John Oliver Lighting and Sound Crew facilitates all audio/visual activities at events including assemblies, theater productions, and the Multicultural Show.
- Multicultural Club – The Multicultural Club encourages multiculturalism by hosting year-round multicultural events including the John Oliver Annual Multicultural Show.
- Eyes of Hope – A club that focuses on spreading awareness about the world's critical issues and crises. In addition, they also conduct many fundraising campaigns throughout the course of the year.
- JO Ambassadors – Being a community service club, JO Ambassadors plays an important role in the major events that take place in the school. Most members volunteer to help out in many public events.
- Environmental Club (Trash Talkers) – Promotes sustainability and environmental awareness throughout the school and the community through green projects and daily tips.

== Notable graduates ==
- Eileen Dailly, former BC MLA and Minister of Education, notable for abolishing corporal punishment in BC schools.
- Herb Dhaliwal, first Indo-Canadian person to become a member of federal cabinet.
- Walter Gage, University of British Columbia professor and administrator. Order of Canada recipient (1971).
- Mozhdah Jamalzadah, Afghan singer, model and TV show host (2000).
- Evander Kane, NHL hockey player currently playing for the Vancouver Canucks.
- William "Willie" Loftus, former Canadian Football League player.
- Jim Pattison, billionaire businessman and Order of Canada recipient.
- Ray Perrault, former Liberal Party of Canada Member of Parliament and Senator.
- Gordon 'Gogie' Stewart, member of the BC Sports Hall of Fame.

== Media ==
American comedy-drama film, What Goes Up starring Hilary Duff, Josh Peck and Steve Coogan was filmed in John Oliver.

Gym interior and outdoor scenes in American teen drama television series, Riverdale were filmed in and outside John Oliver.

Some school scenes for Death Note (2017 film) were filmed in and outside the school.

The Netflix slasher film, There's Someone Inside Your House starring Sydney Park, Théodore Pellerin and Burkely Duffield was filmed in John Oliver.
