= Paul Kane High School =

Alberta High School

École Secondaire Paul Kane High School

Location
- 12 Cunningham Road; St. Albert, Alberta, T8N 2E9; Canada

Information
- School type: Public
- Founded: 1963
- School board: St. Albert Public School District No. 5565
- Principal: Erin Steele Colleen Anderson (Asst. Principal, Gr. 10 Admin.) Kris Horb (Asst. Principal, Gr. 11 Admin.) Ruby Solomon (Asst. Principal, Gr. 12 Admin.)
- Grades: 10–12
- Enrollment: ~1,300
- Language: English and French
- Colours: Blue and white
- Mascot: Bear
- Team name: Blues
- Website: pkhs.spschools.org

École Secondaire Paul Kane High School (PKHS) is a dual track high school in St. Albert, Alberta, Canada and is a part of St. Albert Public Schools. Opened in 1963, Paul Kane was the first Protestant high school in St. Albert. The school was named after Paul Kane, a painter known for his paintings of western Canadian First Nations people. The school currently has an enrollment of just under 1,300 students. Paul Kane's school colours are blue and white, with its sports teams being named the Blues. PKHS has sports programs including basketball, rugby, volleyball, and football.

The school's previous building was announced to be replaced by the Alberta Government as part of their 2018 budget. The replacement occurred in the second semester of the 2022–2023 school year, and the new building is the third building that the school has occupied.

== Programs of study ==
Required programs offered include the 10 to 30 level courses in both the 1 and 2 sequences. Some 14 and 24 level courses are also offered. They also offer a paleontology program. (Note: Courses in Alberta are categorized by course number and sequence. The course number indicates the grade of the course, and the sequence indicates the type of challenge. For example, a 10–1 course indicates a grade level of 10 that focuses in abstract challenges, whereas a 20–2 course indicates a grade level of 11 that focuses primarily on concrete challenges.)

== History ==
Paul Kane High School was the first Protestant high school in St. Albert. It was built as a response by its school district – then called Protestant Separate School District No. 6 – to the rapid growth of the Protestant population in St. Albert. Before Paul Kane was built, the only other option for high school students in St. Albert was to attend St. Albert Catholic High School. The school was named after Paul Kane, a painter who had once been commissioned by the Hudson Bay Company to paint pictures of the life of the aboriginal people in the Canadian West. At the school's inauguration, a representative of the company presented a trophy to the Student's Union, to be given each year to the grade 12 student who achieves the best score in his or her final testing.

Construction on the first site for Paul Kane High School began in 1961, with the school opening its doors for its first students on September 1, 1963. The building cost $515,832 to build, housing 20 staff members and 343 students from grade 7 to 12. (Note: Sources vary on this figure. "Official Opening Paul Kane High School", an article by the St. Albert Gazette that was written at the time of the school's inauguration, cites $515,832 as the figure, yet a retrospective article written by the same publication years later, "School Board Celebrates Paul Kane's History," cites $750,000.) The building was designed as an experimental "windowless school," with each classroom having only one window, and the building itself having a central skylight. The concept was used both to reduce heat transfer from outside, and to prevent the distraction of the school's students. Some rooms had removable partitions that teachers could use to join classrooms, causing complaints of noise from the students. Some students described the setup as "prison-like."

By the early 1970s, the school could no longer accommodate its students, and so a new school was built across the field. The new location opened its doors in 1973, with students reportedly having "lugged their desks across the field" only to resume classes shortly after. The first location became Lorne Akins Junior High.

A study was done in 1979 on the feasibility of Paul Kane getting a football team; the school didn't get a team until 2011.

In 2012, Paul Kane's Protestant school district, as well as the schools under it, became public at the request of the Alberta government. The new district became formally known as St. Albert Public School District No. 5565, or St. Albert Public Schools for short.

== 2022 replacement project ==
Site plans for the new high school

In March 2018, the Alberta government announced it would be replacing Paul Kane High School as part of Budget 2018. Citing aging infrastructure and a growing student base, the government identified that the existing school would no longer be able to meet the needs of its students. The new school was scheduled to be built during the 2022–2023 school year and planned to expand capacity by 500 students, bringing the total student capacity to 1,500. The cost of the project was expected to range between $45–80 million, making the school the largest of the projects announced in the budget.

Draft plans for the new school were released in February 2019. The new building was planned to be located directly behind the old building. Among other features, the school was planned to contain two floors, large windows, a larger gym with an attached drama room, 300 parking stalls, solar panels, and a new soccer field where the old school once stood.

Construction began in September 2020 and concluded in December 2022. Students in the Registered Apprenticeship Program participated in construction of the new building. The new building opened on January 9, 2023. Construction cost approximately $50 million.

Demolition of the old building began in April 2023.

== Alumni ==
Paul Kane has produced a number of notable alumni, many of whom are known for their achievements in athletics.

Name	Class	Notable for
Hailey Benedict	2020	Country music singer-songwriter
Marisa Dick	2015	Artistic gymnast
Vivienne Horne (Canadian politician)	2009	Spruce Grove MLA
Jarome Iginla	1995	NHL hockey player
Marc Kennedy	1999	Olympic curler
Stephen Khan	Unknown	St. Albert MLA
Meaghan Mikkelson	2002 (Note: Grade 11)	Olympic hockey player
Colton Parayko	2010	NHL hockey player
Marlee Scott	2003	Country music singer-songwriter
Dave Shipanoff	Unknown	MLB baseball player
Andrew Tiedemann	Unknown	Canadian rugby player
Padma Viswanathan	1984	Author & playwright

Notable alumni of Paul Kane High School

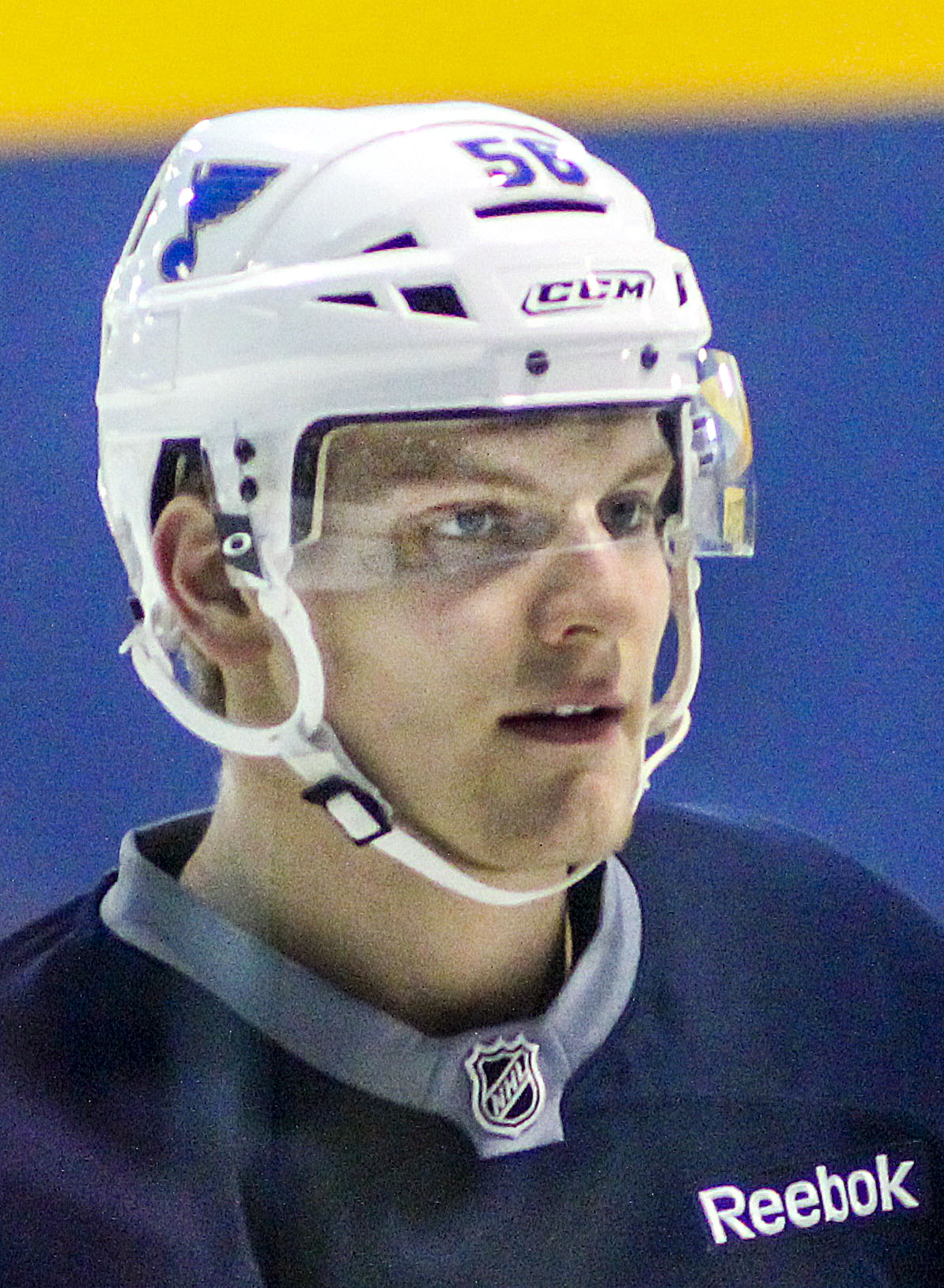
Colton Parayko

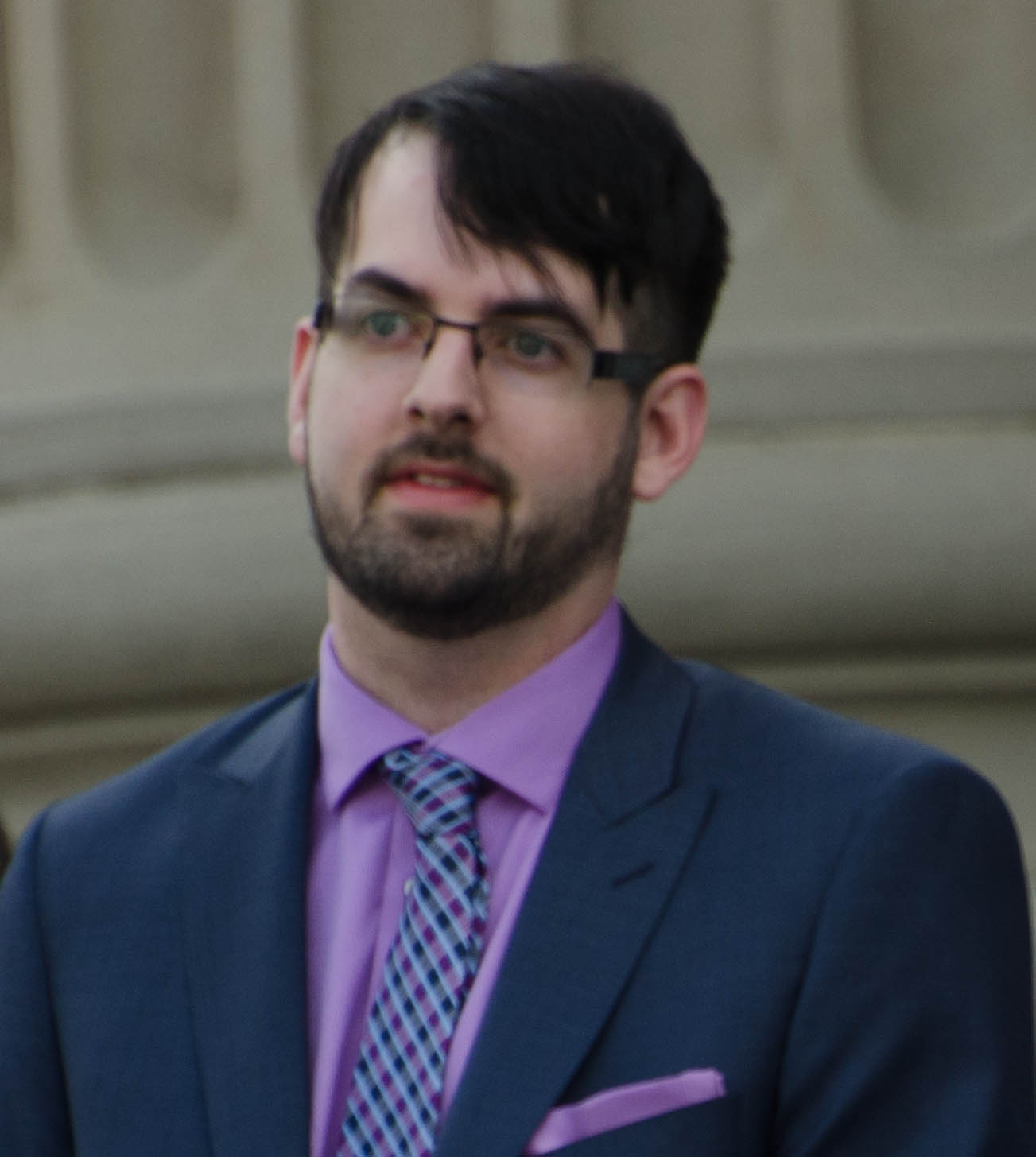
Vivienne Horne

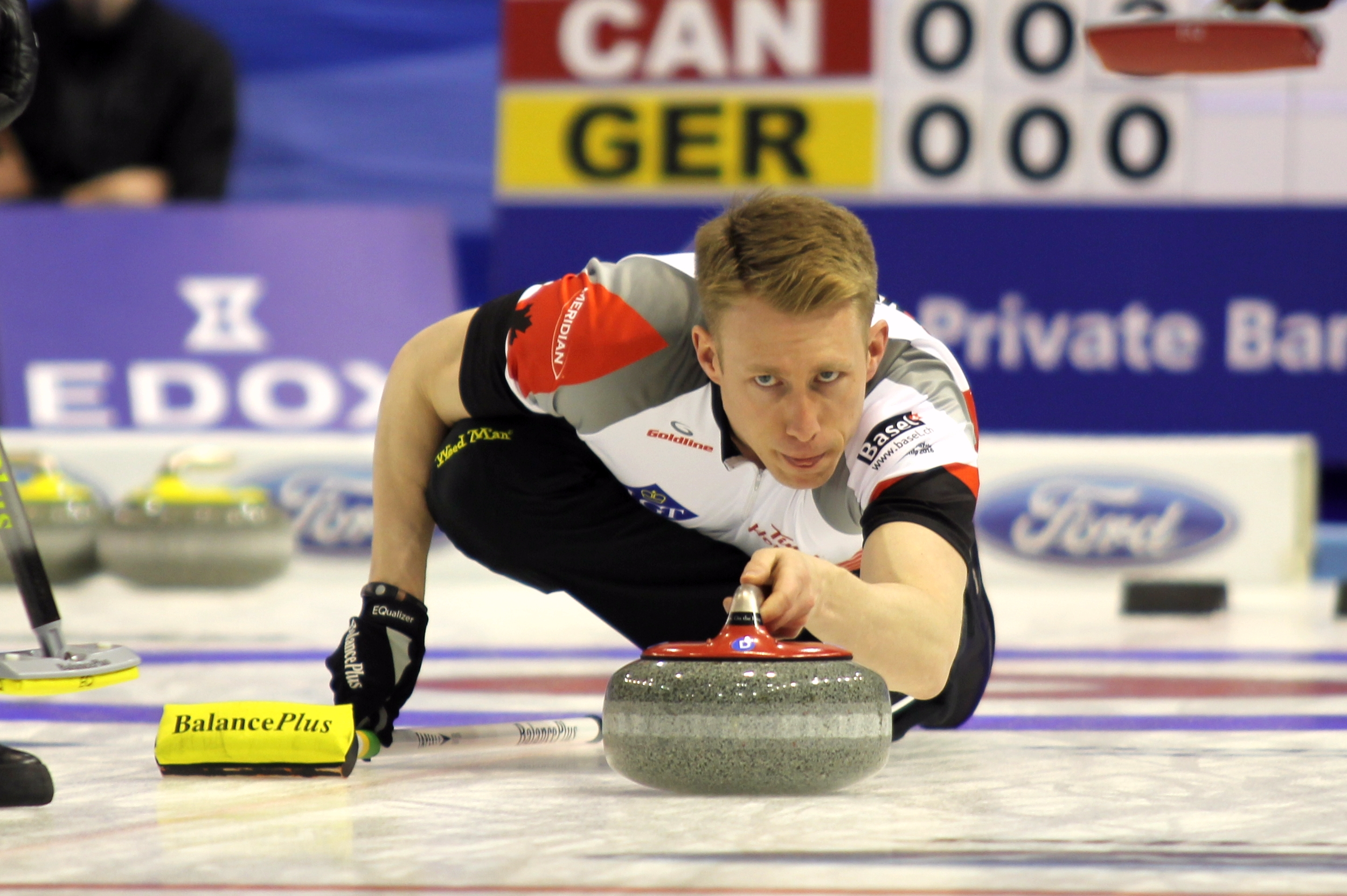
Marc Kennedy

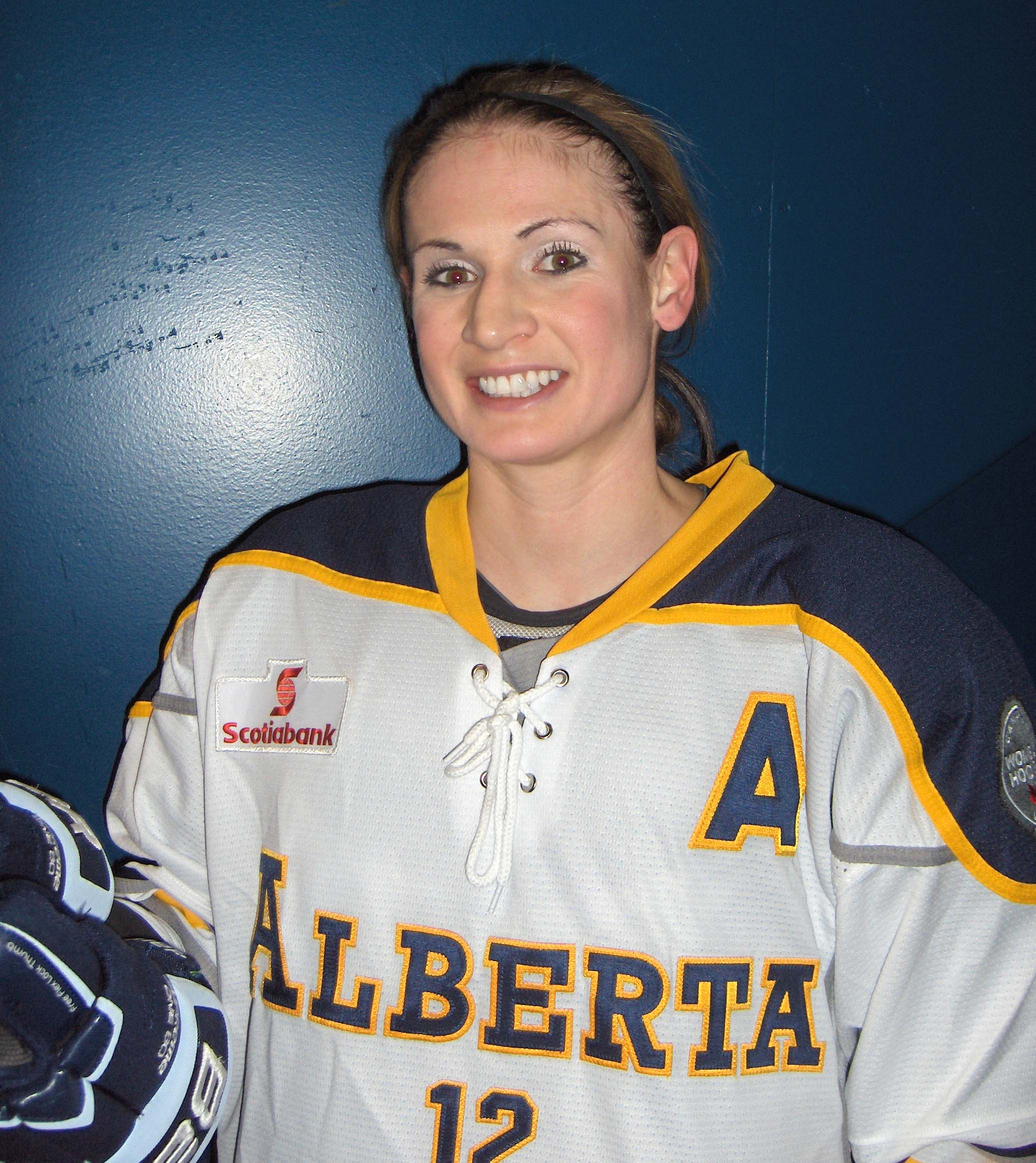
Meaghan Mikkelson

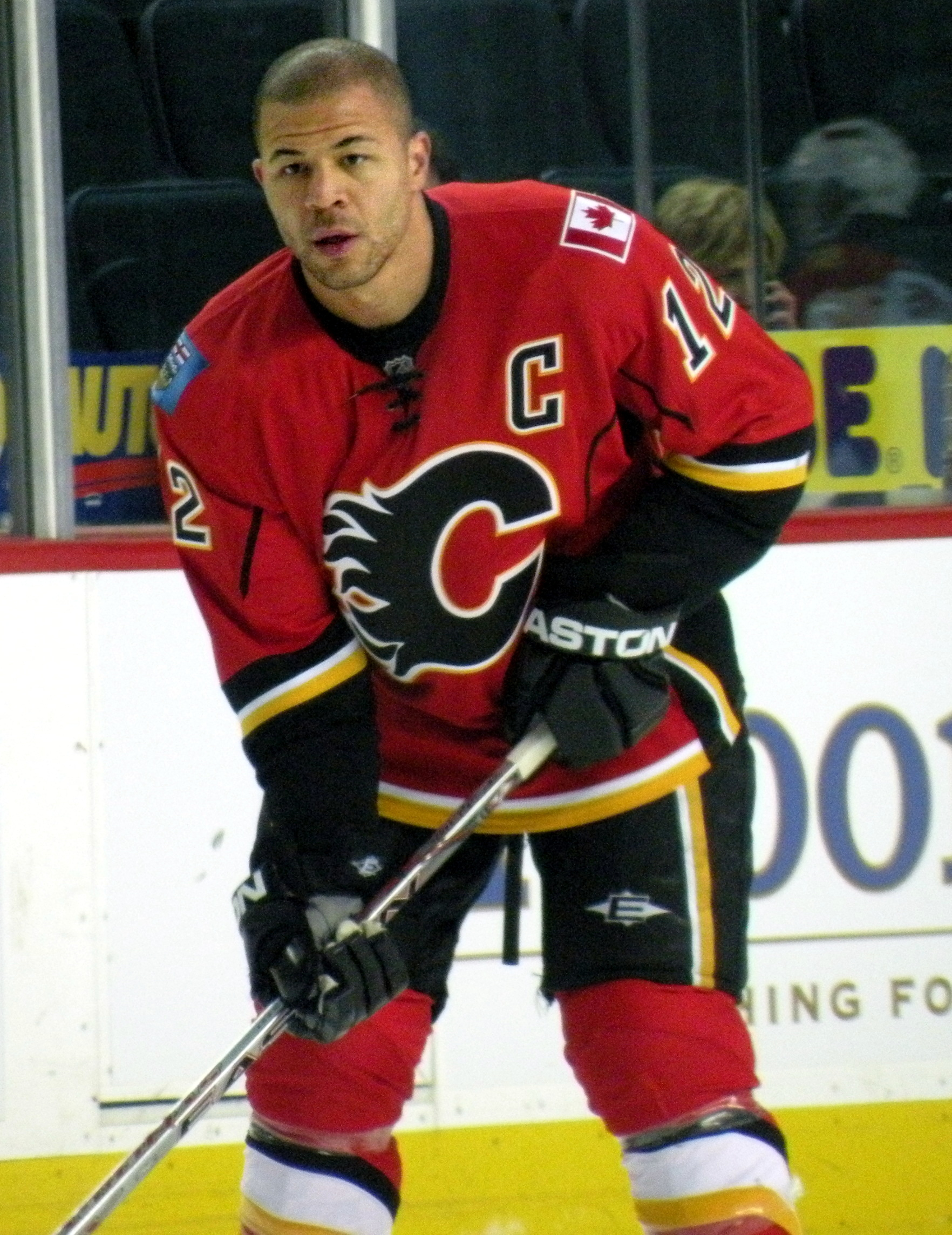
Jarome Iginla
