= Marc Emery =

Canadian politician (born 1958)

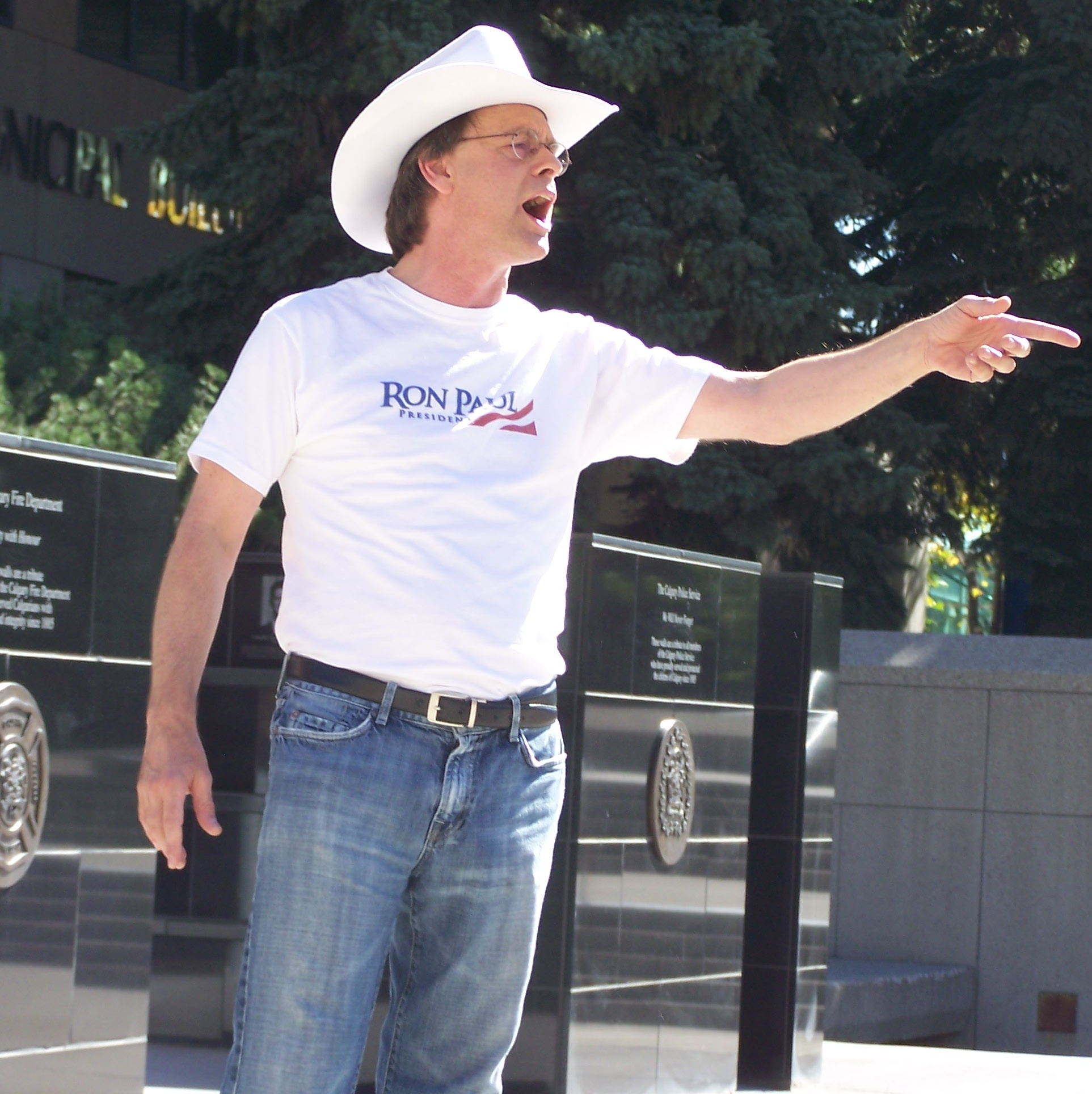
- Marc Emery at a pro-marijuana rally outside City Hall in Calgary, September 2007.
- Born: Marc Scott Emery; February 13, 1958 (age 68); London, Ontario, Canada
- Other name: Prince of Pot
- Occupations: Politician, activist, entrepreneur
- Known for: Cannabis policy reform advocate
- Political party: Freedom Party (1978–2000); British Columbia Marijuana Party (2000–present) Conservative Party of Canada (2017) People's Party of Canada (2018–present)
- Criminal charge: Selling cannabis seeds
- Criminal penalty: 5 years in prison
- Criminal status: Released
- Spouse(s): Jodie Emery (Divorced, 2021)

Marc Scott Emery (born February 13, 1958) is a Canadian cannabis rights activist, entrepreneur and politician. Often described as the "Prince of Pot", Emery has been a notable advocate of international cannabis policy reform, and has been active in multiple Canadian political parties at the provincial and federal levels. Emery has been jailed several times for his cannabis activism.

He is the former spouse of fellow activist Jodie Emery, with whom he operated Cannabis Culture magazine and Pot TV. Until the business was raided by police, the couple were co-owners of Cannabis Culture, a business that franchised pot dispensaries. Crown prosecutors later deemed the business to be illegal due to obtaining cannabis from illegal sources.

== Early life ==
At the age of 9, Emery started a business from his parents' home called Stamp Treasure, buying and selling stamps by mail order. Two years later he started another mail-order business called Marc's Comic Room that he started by using the money saved from Stamp Treasure. The business sold used comic books and earned him about $120 a week.

He dropped out of high school in 1975 at age 17 to purchase a used book store in London, Ontario which he renamed City Lights Bookshop. Emery operated the store for 17 years, selling it in 1992.

== Businesses ==
=== Hemp BC ===
Emery moved to Vancouver, British Columbia in March 1994, and founded Hemp BC, a store selling cannabis-related paraphernalia. Bongs and pipes were illegal to sell or promote in Canada and were not readily available at the time.

In late 1994, a court challenge sponsored by Emery convinced an Ontario judge to overturn the Canadian prohibition on marijuana and drug-related literature, making it legal for High Times magazine and marijuana grow books to be sold in Canada once more. Emery began selling seeds after attending the High Times Cannabis Cup. The business was featured on the front page of The Wall Street Journal in 1995. In early 1995 he launched Cannabis Canada Magazine, which was renamed Cannabis Culture magazine in 1998.

The store was raided twice in 1996 and 1997. Emery received charges relating to illegal sales of paraphernalia and seeds, as well as assaulting a police officer. He was later convicted and given a $2,200 fine for the sales and jail time for the assault. Emery was also banned from returning to the 300 block of West Hastings, where his businesses were located.

The store was repeatedly raided through 1998 after its sale to the store manager. Her business licence was subsequently revoked by the city. In August 1998, Vancouver Mayor Philip Owen had told The New York Times that Hemp BC was "going to be toast by September." Emery switched his walk-in marijuana seed business to mail-order only, and continued to publish Cannabis Culture magazine. In early 2000 he established Pot-TV, a marijuana-related video channel. From 1998 until his arrest in 2005, Emery paid provincial and federal taxes as a "marijuana seed vendor" totalling nearly $600,000.

=== Cannabis Culture ===
On December 15, 2016, Marc and Jodie Emery opened six illegal Cannabis Culture marijuana "dispensaries" in Montreal, Quebec as an act of "civil disobedience". On 16 December 2016, Marc Emery was arrested at the Mont-Royal Avenue store, during a series of raids conducted by the Montreal police. Jodie Emery was released later that night with no charges, while Marc was held overnight. Following this arrest, Emery continued to open dispensary franchises in cities such as Hamilton and Ottawa. At one time, a total of 19 Cannabis Culture dispensaries were in operation in British Columbia, Ontario and Quebec.

== Political activity ==
Emery worked on the New Democratic Party's campaign in London East in the 1979 federal election. He was a critic of slow police response times to robberies, advocating for private security officers for merchants and business owners. He started a campaign to eliminate the annual levy tax of $35 a year for downtown improvements, stating that it favoured a handful of the elite. He ran for the Libertarian Party of Canada in the 1980 federal election, finishing fourth in London East.

Emery later left the Libertarians and became a London-area organizer for the libertarian Unparty, later renamed the Freedom Party of Ontario. Emery served as the Freedom Party's "action director" from 1984 to 1990. In 1984, Emery, the Freedom Party, and the No Tax for Pan-Am Games Committee (founded by Emery and Metz) successfully campaigned against London's bid for the 1991 Pan American Games, saying the city would lose millions. Emery ran as a candidate of the Freedom Party in the rural constituency of Middlesex, near London, Ontario in the 1987 provincial election. He received 499 votes for a distant fifth-place finish.

In 1982 and 1985, Emery unsuccessfully ran for alderman in Ward 3 of London, Ontario. In May 1987 during a strike by city workers, Emery paid for truck rentals and volunteers to do the jobs of the striking workers. This caused outrage, leading to the strikers threatening to dump garbage on Emery's front lawn.

He ran for mayor of the city of Vancouver in 1996, 2002 and 2008.

In 2000 he was a founding member of the Marijuana Party of Canada. Emery ran for the Canadian House of Commons as a Marijuana Party candidate in the 2000 federal election. In 2001 he helped found the British Columbia Marijuana Party (BCMP). The BCMP placed fifth in the 2001 provincial election. Emery has been the BC Marijuana Party's president since its founding, and also became party leader in 2003, when Dana Larsen resigned to join the NDP.

In 2003, when the prohibition of cannabis in Canada was in limbo, Emery launched "the Summer of Legalization" tour, travelling to 18 cities across Canada to openly smoke marijuana in front of police stations.

In November 2003, Emery endorsed NDP leader Jack Layton during an interview with Layton on the Pot TV program. In the 2005 British Columbia election, Emery ran for the BC Marijuana Party, but was defeated. He endorsed Svend Robinson's candidacy in Vancouver Centre during the 2006 federal election campaign.

In the 2009 BC provincial election, Emery supported the Green Party of British Columbia. His wife, Jodie Emery, was the BC Green candidate in Vancouver-Fraserview. She had sought the Liberal Party of Canada's nomination in Vancouver East for the 2015 federal election, however, her candidacy was disallowed by the party. The Liberal Party, which had campaigned on cannabis legalization, secured a majority in the election and legalized cannabis in 2018 with the Cannabis Act.

Marc Emery endorsed Maxime Bernier's candidacy for the leadership of the federal Conservative Party in 2016 and announced his intention to join the Conservatives in order to vote for Bernier, due to the candidate's libertarian platform. In the 2019 Canadian federal election, he supported the People's Party of Canada (PPC), which Bernier founded after leaving the Conservative Party. He ran for the PPC in London North Centre during the 2021 election, finishing in fourth place with 5% of the vote.

== Legal issues ==
US government officials have described Emery as a drug dealer for his efforts to sell marijuana seeds in Canada and abroad.

=== 1991 obscenity charges ===
In 1991, Emery was convicted for selling copies of 2 Live Crew's rap CD As Nasty as They Wanna Be which had been deemed obscene and banned in Ontario. He was given one year's probation, but immediately after sentencing he began selling marijuana-related literature and High Times magazine, all in violation of Canadian law. Emery invited local police to his store to arrest him, but the police refused to charge him or interfere. He also sponsored visits from marijuana activists including Ed Rosenthal, Steven Hager, Jack Herer and Paul Mavrides.

=== 1998 conviction ===
Court documents showed that four American Navy undercover agents attempted to buy marijuana and smoke it at the Vancouver Cannabis Cafe in April 1998. The documents showed the Naval Criminal Investigative Service agents worked in a joint operation with Vancouver police. Emery was convicted on charges of selling marijuana seeds in 1998, and received a $2,000 fine.

=== 2004 trafficking conviction ===
On August 19, 2004, Emery was sentenced to 92 days in jail in Saskatoon, Saskatchewan. Emery had been convicted of trafficking because a witness saw him pass a joint in March 2004. Emery's supporters held an ongoing daily vigil outside the courthouse until he was released. On October 18 he was released from the Saskatoon correctional centre after serving 61 days of his sentence.

=== 2005 arrest and extradition ===
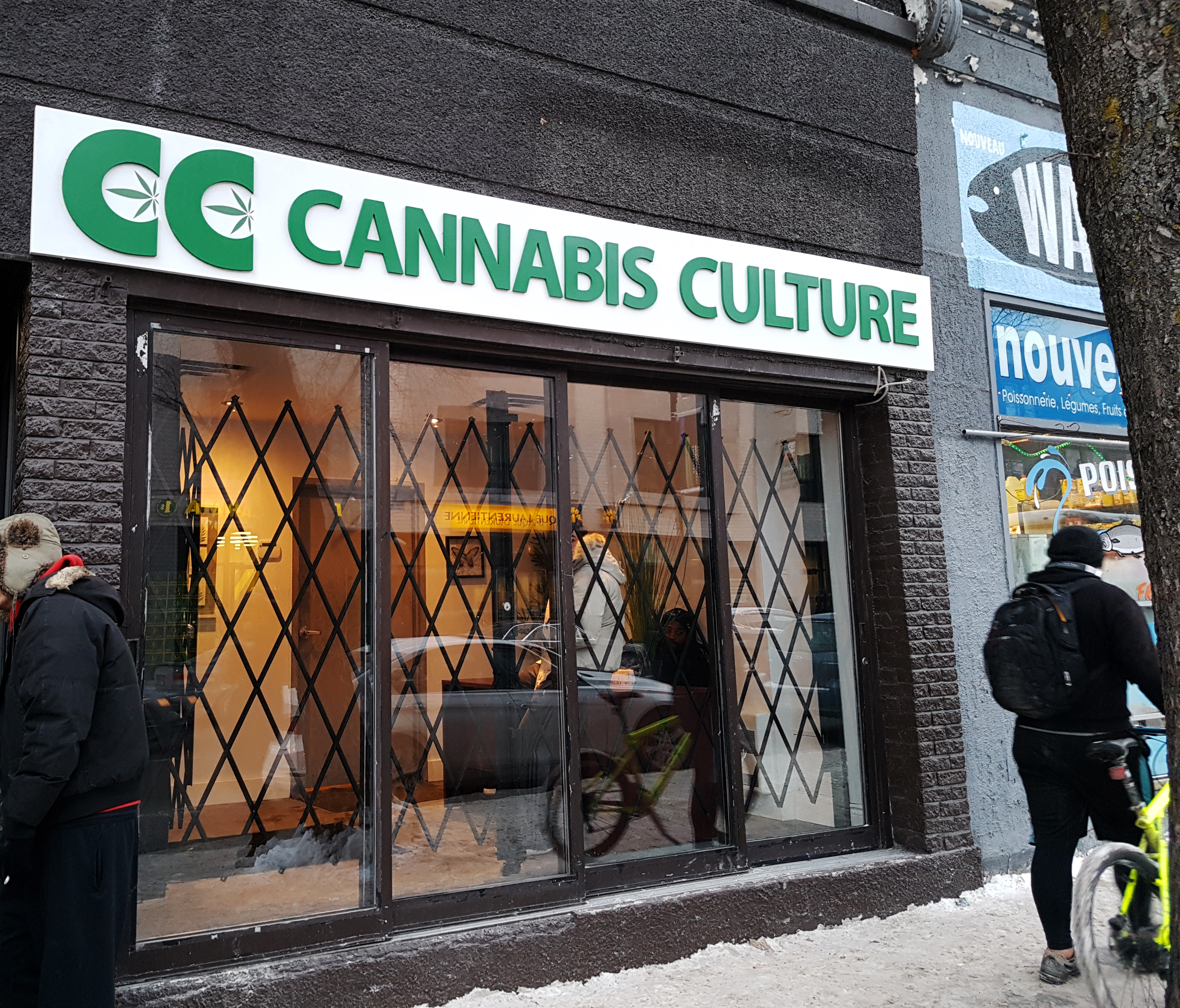
One of the six Cannabis Culture shops opened by Marc Emery in Montreal in December 2016, leading to his arrest.

On July 29, 2005, Canadian police, acting on a request from the United States Drug Enforcement Administration (DEA), simultaneously raided the BC Marijuana Party Bookstore and Headquarters in Vancouver and arrested Emery for extradition to the United States outside a storefront in Lawrencetown, Nova Scotia.

American authorities charged Emery and co-defendants Gregory Keith Williams and Michelle Rainey-Fenkarek with "'Conspiracy to Distribute Marijuana", "Conspiracy to Distribute Marijuana Seeds" and "Conspiracy to Engage in Money Laundering". Even though all the alleged offences occurred in Canada, Canadian police did not lay any charges.

The day of Emery's arrest, American DEA Administrator Karen Tandy made a public statement asserting that the arrest was "a significant blow not only to the marijuana trafficking trade in the U.S. and Canada, but also to the marijuana legalization movement." Emery was freed on a $50,000 bail.

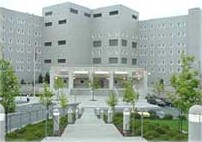
Federal Detention Center, SeaTac, where Emery resided in 2010.

Emery and his two associates, all charged in the United States with drug and money laundering offences, each faced a minimum 10-year sentence and the possibility of life imprisonment if convicted there. On January 14, 2008, Emery agreed to a tentative plea-bargain with U.S. authorities. The terms of the agreement were a 5-year prison term to be served in both Canadian and U.S. prisons. In return, he demanded the charges against his associates be dropped. On March 27, 2008 the plea-bargain deal collapsed because of the refusal of the Canadian government to approve its side of the arrangement. Emery agreed to plead guilty to one charge of drug distribution and accept a five-year sentence in the USA.

During Emery's 45 day incarceration while awaiting extradition to a US federal prison, his supporters held a continuous vigil outside the prison with tents and banners, ending when Emery was released on bail. On May 10, 2010, Justice Minister Rob Nicholson signed the order for Emery to surrender to authorities, which he did that same day. On May 20, 2010, Emery was extradited to the United States, pleading guilty on May 24 to one count of conspiracy to manufacture marijuana. On September 10, 2010, Emery was sentenced to 5 years in prison minus time served. While at the Federal Detention Center in SeaTac, Washington Emery was locked in a Segregated Housing Unit (SHU) for three weeks as a result of allowing his wife to record a message from him over the phone.

On June 30, 2014, Emery announced his pending release in a blog post on the Cannabis Culture website. On July 9, 2014, he was released, having served just over four years of his five-year sentence having earned 235 days of good conduct credit.

=== Project Gator ===
Marc and Jodie Emery were again arrested at Toronto Pearson International Airport on March 8, 2017. He faced 15 charges, including conspiracy to commit an indictable offence, trafficking, possession for the purpose of trafficking, and possession of proceeds of crime. Jodie Emery faced five similar counts. On March 9, 2017, search warrants were given in Toronto, Hamilton, and Vancouver as part of "Project Gator" a Toronto Police Service project that targeted marijuana dispensaries. This was in reaction to Acting Inspector Steve Watts allegations of Cannabis Culture having ties to organized crime. Five dispensaries in Toronto, one in Hamilton, one in Vancouver, and another in Ottawa were raided and shut down. Police seized $250,000 in cash in several different currencies. The police also searched two homes in Toronto, one in Stoney Creek, Ontario, and one in Vancouver that all had ties to Emery's Cannabis Culture franchise. Some of the dispensaries reopened the next day. On March 10, Marc and Jodie were granted bail, with conditions limiting or banning their access to marijuana and Cannabis Culture franchises. After a guilty plea, the couple was convicted of drug-related charges on December 18, 2017, fined and placed on two years probation. Three other individuals were also convicted of drug-related charges. The couple had claimed that the operation of pot shops was a form of civil disobedience, but Justice Leslie Chapin ruled as follows: "No doubt there were pro-social motivations that were behind the actions, but at the same time, I have to recognize that much profit was made".

== Non-marijuana activism ==
As a political libertarian, Emery has also protested against Sunday shopping laws, obscenity laws, political endorsement of sporting events, Canadian censorship, and several taxes.

In 2002, Emery founded the Iboga Therapy House, an ibogaine-assisted detoxification therapy program located on British Columbia's Sunshine Coast. Emery and his staff offered free ibogaine therapy to volunteer heroin and cocaine addicts with a plant-based alkaloid called ibogaine, which has been claimed to help people quit addictions.

== Media ==
On October 12, 1997, Marc Emery was featured on CNN Impact in an episode called "Canada Cannabis." The announcer referred to Emery as the "Prince of Pot" and the label stuck.

In 2001, Emery was a featured presenter at Idea City, an annual gathering of notable Canadians organized by Moses Znaimer. In November 2002, Emery and his guests heckled then US drug czar John Walters during his speech at a luncheon sponsored by the Vancouver Board of Trade.

Emery is featured in the 2007 CBC documentary film Prince of Pot: The US vs. Marc Emery, and the CBC Doc Zone episode "Cannabiz". He also appears in a 2007 documentary called The Union: The Business Behind Getting High, and the 2007 comedy documentary Super High Me. Emery was the focus of the 2013 feature documentary, Citizen Marc.

== Sexual harassment allegations ==
In January 2019, several women came forward with allegations of sexual harassment against Emery. These allegations were denied by Emery in several Facebook posts. As a result of these allegations, Emery was pulled as the keynote speaker from the First International Cannabis Seminar held in Argentina in February 2019. Prior to his removal, two Argentine politicians and a journalist cancelled their appearances in protest of Emery's presence at the conference. Shortly after, the Legalized Summit in Vancouver withdrew Emery's nomination for a lifetime achievement award and removed his estranged wife Jodie as a speaker.

== Electoral record ==
2021 Canadian federal election: London North Centre
Party	Candidate	Votes	%	±%	Expenditures
Liberal	Peter Fragiskatos	22,921	39.1	−3.7	$113,155.98
Conservative	Stephen Gallant	15,889	27.1	+3.5	$41,974.20
New Democratic	Dirka Prout	15,611	26.6	+3.2	$50,557.41
People's	Marc Emery	2,902	5.0	+2.6	$7,075.62
Green	Mary Ann Hodge	1,297	2.2	−5.4	$3,699.64
Total valid votes		58,620	99.2		
Total rejected ballots		460	0.8		
Turnout		59,080	62.2		
Eligible voters		94,977			
Liberal hold		Swing		−3.6	
Source: Elections Canada

=== 2008 Vancouver Mayoral Election ===
Candidate name	Party affiliation	Votes	% of votes
Gregor Robertson	Vision Vancouver	67,598	54.39%
Peter Ladner	Non-Partisan Association	48,794	39.26%
Betty Krawczyk	Work Less Party of British Columbia	1,346	1.08%
Marc Emery	Independent	1,119	0.90%
Scott Yee	Independent	942	0.31%
Patrick Britten	Nude Garden Party	695	0.76%
Jeff Kuah	Independent	600	0.48%
Angel L. Jimenez	Independent	320	0.26%
Leon Kaplan	Independent	299	0.24%
Bill Ritchie	Independent	252	0.20%
Joe Hatoum	Independent	241	0.19%
Gölök Z. Buday	Independent	172	0.14%
Menard D. Caissey	Independent	137	0.11%
N. Bur Maxwell	Independent	125	0.10%

2005 British Columbia general election: Fort Langley-Aldergrove
Party	Candidate	Votes	%
Liberal	Rich Coleman	15,454	59.13
New Democratic	Shane Dyson	7,597	29.07
Green	Andrea Meagan Welling	2,529	9.68
Marijuana	Marc Emery	374	1.43
Platinum	Stephen Christopher Davis	183	0.70
Total valid votes		26,137	
Source: Elections Canada

=== 2002 Vancouver Mayoral Election ===
Candidate name	Party affiliation	Votes	% of votes
Larry Campbell	Coalition of Progressive Electors	80,772	57.79%
Jennifer Clarke	Non-Partisan Association	41,936	30.01%
Valerie Maclean	Vancouver Civic Action Team	7,843	5.61%
Raymond Chang	Independent	2,777	1.99%
Marc Emery	Vancouver Marijuana Party	2,014	1.44%
Ndyabagyera Anatoli	Independent	426	0.30%
Thomas Reekie	Vancouver Independent Progressives	353	0.25%
Dave Carson	Independent	348	0.25%
Beverly Bernardo	Independent	279	0.20%
Frank N. D'Agostino	Independent	254	0.18%
Gölök Buday	Independent	222	0.16%
Patrick Britten	Independent	188	0.13%
André Paris	Independent	133	0.10%
M. G. MacLeod	Independent	131	0.09%
Ben Krakowsky	Independent	126	0.09%
Trina Ferguson	Independent	105	0.08%

2001 British Columbia general election: Vancouver-Burrard
Party	Candidate	Votes	%	±%	Expenditures
Liberal	Lorne Mayencourt	11,396	48.11	+10.88	$46,939
New Democratic	Tim Stevenson	7,359	31.07	−18.63	$45,493
Green	Robbie Mattu	3,826	16.15	+13.52	$1,029
Marijuana	Marc Emery	906	3.82	–	$394
Unity	Gregory Paul Michael Hartnell	290	1.15	–	–
Independent	Boris Bear	136	0.57	–	$157
People's Front	Joseph Theriault	40	0.17	–	$57
Independent Rhinoceros	Helvis	25	0.11	–	$100
Total valid votes		23,688	100.00		
Total rejected ballots		123	0.52		
Turnout		23,811	63.67		

2000 Canadian federal election: Vancouver Centre
Party	Candidate	Votes	%	±%	Expenditures
Liberal	Hedy Fry	24,553	42.30	+1.54	$69,017
Alliance	John Mortimer	15,176	26.15	+3.56	$68,158
New Democratic	Scott Robertson	6,993	12.05	–8.82	$8,841
Progressive Conservative	Lee Johnson	6,828	11.76	+2.52	$4,047
Green	Jamie Lee Hamilton	2,285	3.94	+0.93	$3,945
Marijuana	Marc Emery	1,116	1.92	–	none listed
Canadian Action	Jeff Jewell	742	1.28	+0.25	$547
Natural Law	Valerie Laporte	177	0.30	–0.12	$40
Communist	Kimball Cariou	99	0.17	–	$189
Marxist–Leninist	Joseph Theriault	75	0.13	–0.10	$364
Total valid votes		58,044	99.52		
Total rejected ballots		280	0.48	–0.05	
Turnout		58,324	60.50	–4.10	
Eligible voters		96,399			
Liberal hold		Swing		–1.01	
Change for the Canadian Alliance is based on the Reform Party.
Source: Elections Canada

=== 1996 Vancouver Mayoral Election ===
Candidate	Party	Votes	%
Philip Owen	NPA	50,969	53.15
Carmela Allevato	COPE	26,143	27.26
Jonathan Baker	Voice	10,703	11.16
Paul Watson	Green	3,117	3.25
Marc Emery	Independent	1,125	1.17
Fifty-three other candidates	Independent	3,835	4.00

1980 Canadian federal election: London East
Party	Candidate	Votes	%	±%
Liberal	Charles Turner	17,861	48.0	+5.5
Progressive Conservative	Bob Howard	11,031	29.7	-5.2
New Democratic	Rob Martin	8,055	21.7	-0.5
Libertarian	Marc Emery	197	0.5	+0.3
Marxist–Leninist	Carol Dagenais	31	0.1	-0.1

== See also ==
- Brian Taylor (British Columbia politician)
