= Rob Nijjar =

Canadian politician (born 1967)

Member of the British Columbia Legislative Assembly for Vancouver-Kingsway
- In office May 16, 2001 – May 17, 2005
- Preceded by: Glen Clark
- Succeeded by: Adrian Dix

Personal details
- Born: 1967 (age 58–59)
- Party: Liberal
- Education: Simon Fraser University

Rob Nijjar (born 1967) is a Canadian politician who served as a member of the Legislative Assembly (MLA) of British Columbia from 2001 to 2005, representing the riding of Vancouver-Kingsway as part of the British Columbia Liberal Party caucus.

A lifelong resident of Vancouver's East Side, he attended school in southeast Vancouver and went to Langara College before studying at Simon Fraser University, where he earned a bachelor's degree in General Studies in 1992. He subsequently worked as a business manager for several firms including Jenny Craig, some family-run restaurants, and other service industry businesses before founding his own public relations company in 1998. He also worked as a community organizer for BC Liberal leader Gordon Campbell.

In the 2001 provincial election, Nijjar ran as a Liberal candidate in Vancouver-Kingsway, a riding previously held by former New Democratic Party (NDP) leader Glen Clark. With the NDP struggling in the polls, Nijjar defeated that party's candidate Alicia Barsallo by 2,835 votes to become the riding's MLA. In the 37th Parliament, Nijjar served on the Government Caucus Committee on the Economy, sat on the Legislative Standing Committee for Education and chaired the Sub-Committee on Youth Employment.

Nijjar was defeated in the 2005 provincial election by NDP candidate Adrian Dix. He has since worked as the executive director for the South Hill Business Improvement Association in Vancouver.

== Election results ==
2005 British Columbia general election: Vancouver-Kingsway
Party	Candidate	Votes	%	Expenditures
New Democratic	Adrian Dix	10,038	51.44	$84,411
Liberal	Rob Nijjar	7,894	40.46	$115,864
Green	Stuart Mackinnon	1,212	6.21	$4,556
Marijuana	Steven Mackenzie Lay	219	1.12	$100
People's Front	Donna Petersen	77	0.39	$103
Sex	Yvonne Maylynne Tink	73	0.37	$100
Total valid votes		19,513	100	
Total rejected ballots		239	1.22	
Turnout		19,752	54.19	

2001 British Columbia general election: Vancouver-Kingsway
Party	Candidate	Votes	%	Expenditures
Liberal	Rob Nijjar	8,264	49.89	$41,856
New Democratic	Alicia Barsallo	5,429	32.78	$41,185
Green	Geoff Lyon	1,725	10.41	$468
Unity	Sal Vetro	541	3.27	$2,569
Marijuana	Steven Mackenzie Lay	364	2.20	$394
Council of British Columbians	Tyler Ducharme	159	0.96	$3,268
People's Front	Donna Petersen	81	0.49	$767
Total valid votes		16,563	100.00	
Total rejected ballots		188	1.14	
Turnout		16,751	67.14	
