= Vancouver-Fairview =

Defunct provincial electoral district in British Columbia, Canada

British Columbia electoral district
- Location in Vancouver

Defunct provincial electoral district
- Legislature: Legislative Assembly of British Columbia
- First contested: 2001
- Last contested: 2020

Demographics
- Population (2014): 59,701
- Area (km²): 9.8
- Census division: Metro Vancouver
- Census subdivision: Vancouver

Vancouver-Fairview is a former provincial electoral district for the Legislative Assembly of British Columbia, Canada in use from 2001 to 2024.

Fairview is made up of two rectangles: one bounded by Granville Street to the east, 16th Avenue to the south, Arbutus Street to the West and 4th Avenue to the north; and a second area bounded on the east by Main Street, on the west by Granville Street, to the south by 33rd Avenue and to the north by the West 4th-West 6th-West 2nd Avenue road.

== Members of the Legislative Assembly ==
This riding has elected the following members of the Legislative Assembly:

Vancouver-Fairview
Assembly	Years	Member	Party
37th	2001–2005	Gary Farrell-Collins	Liberal
38th	2005–2008	Gregor Robertson	New Democratic
38th	2008–2009	Jenn McGinn	New Democratic
39th	2009–2013	Margaret MacDiarmid	Liberal
40th	2013–2017	George Heyman	New Democratic
41st	2017–2020	George Heyman	New Democratic
42nd	2020–2024	George Heyman	New Democratic

== Election results ==
Graph of provincial election results in Vancouver-Fairview (minor parties that never got 2% of the vote or didn't run consistently are omitted)

2020 British Columbia general election
Party	Candidate	Votes	%	±%	Expenditures
New Democratic	George Heyman	15,538	56.07	+1.95	$42,472.54
Liberal	George Affleck	7,570	27.32	−4.53	$52,688.01
Green	Ian Goldman	4,368	15.76	+2.23	$1,481.40
Libertarian	Sandra Filosof-Schipper	234	0.84	–	$0.00
Total valid votes		27,710	100.00	–	
Total rejected ballots		318	1.13	+0.45	
Turnout		28,028	61.08	−4.71	
Registered voters		45,991			
New Democratic hold		Swing		+3.24	
Source: Elections BC

2017 British Columbia general election
Party	Candidate	Votes	%	±%	Expenditures
New Democratic	George Heyman	16,035	54.12	+6.80	$67,813
Liberal	Gabe Garfinkel	9,436	31.85	-10.41	$66,722
Green	Louise Boutin	4,007	13.53	+3.11	$437
Your Political Party	Joey Doyle	149	0.50	–	$344
Total valid votes		29,627	100.00	–	
Total rejected ballots		204	0.68	-0.14	
Turnout		29,831	65.79	+6.81	
Registered voters		45,343			
Source: Elections BC

2013 British Columbia general election
Party	Candidate	Votes	%
New Democratic	George Heyman	12,649	47.32
Liberal	Margaret MacDiarmid	11,298	42.26
Green	Matthew Pedley	2,785	10.42
Total valid votes		26,732	100.00
Total rejected ballots		220	0.82
Turnout		26,952	58.98
Source: Elections BC

2009 British Columbia general election
Party	Candidate	Votes	%	Expenditures
Liberal	Margaret MacDiarmid	11,034	47.09	$144,364
New Democratic	Jenn McGinn	9,881	42.17	$106,859
Green	Vanessa Violini	2,232	9.52	$749
Independent	Graham Clark	165	0.70	$250
Reform	Norris Matthew Barens	85	0.36	$250
Refederation	Alex Frei	37	0.16	$260

By-election, October 29, 2008: Vancouver-Fairview
Party	Candidate	Votes	%	±	Expenditures
NDP	Jenn McGinn	5,752	46.98		$70,030
Liberal	Margaret MacDiarmid	4,936	40.32		$92,092
Green	Jane Sterk	900	7.35	–	$7,773
Conservative	Wilf Hanni	489	3.99		$6,886
Marijuana	Jodie Emery	166	1.36		$430
Total valid votes		12,243	100%		
Total rejected ballots		29	0.24%		
Turnout		12,272	26.93%		

2005 British Columbia general election
Party	Candidate	Votes	%	Expenditures
New Democratic	Gregor Robertson	13,009	46.59	$138,500
Liberal	Virginia Greene	12,114	43.39	$159,138
Green	Hamdy El-Rayes	2,479	8.88	$1,468
Sex	Patrick Gallagher Clark	121	0.43	$100
Central Party	Scott Yee	102	0.37	$110
Work Less	Malcolm Janet Mary van Delst	95	0.34	$100
Total valid votes		27,920	100	
Total rejected ballots		206	0.74	
Turnout		28,126	60.64	

2001 British Columbia general election
Party	Candidate	Votes	%	Expenditures
Liberal	Gary Farrell-Collins	12,864	54.94	$35,510
Green	Vanessa Violini	5,051	21.57	$3,659
New Democratic	Anita Romaniuk	4,772	20.38	$9,902
Marijuana	Ron MacIntyre	651	2.78	$735
People's Front	Brian Sproule	76	0.33	$57
Total valid votes		23,414	100.00	
Total rejected ballots		142	0.61	
Turnout		23,556	64.20	
Source: Legislative Library of British Columbia

== Student vote results ==
Student Vote Canada is a non-partisan program in Canada that holds mock elections in elementary and high schools alongside general elections (with the same candidates and same electoral system).

2020 British Columbia general election
Party	Candidate	Votes	%	±%
New Democratic	George Hayman	234	42.86	−12.27
Green	Ian Goldman	178	32.60	+3.69
Liberal	George Affleck	105	19.23	+7.86
Libertarian	Sandra Filosof-Schipper	29	5.31	–
Total valid votes		546	100.0	–

2017 British Columbia general election
Party	Candidate	Votes	%	±%
New Democratic	George Hayman	349	55.13	+23.73
Green	Louis Boutin	183	28.91	-7.14
Liberal	Gabe Garfinkel	72	11.37	-21.19
Your Political Party	Joey Doyle	29	4.58	–
Total valid votes		633	100.0	–

2013 British Columbia general election
Party	Candidate	Votes	%
Green	Matthew Pedley	31	36.05
Liberal	Margaret MacDiarmid	28	32.56
New Democratic	George Hayman	27	31.4
Total valid votes		86	100.0

== See also ==
- List of British Columbia provincial electoral districts
- Canadian provincial electoral districts
- Vancouver (electoral districts)
