= Margaret MacDiarmid =

Canadian politician

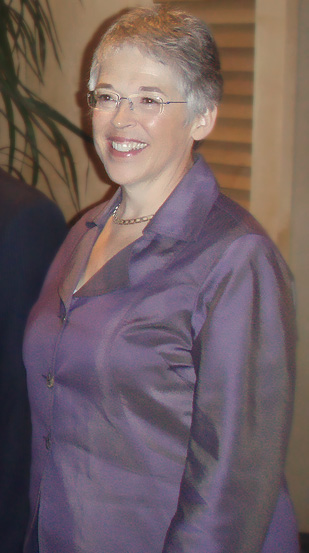

Member of the British Columbia Legislative Assembly for Vancouver-Fairview
- In office May 12, 2009 – May 14, 2013
- Preceded by: Jenn McGinn
- Succeeded by: George Heyman

Minister of Education and Minister Responsible for Early Learning and Literacy of British Columbia
- In office June 10, 2009 – October 25, 2010
- Premier: Gordon Campbell
- Preceded by: Shirley Bond
- Succeeded by: George Abbott

Minister of Tourism, Trade and Investment and Minister Responsible for the Intergovernmental Relations Secretariat of British Columbia
- In office October 25, 2010 – March 14, 2011
- Premier: Gordon Campbell
- Preceded by: Kevin Krueger
- Succeeded by: Pat Bell (Jobs, Tourism and Innovation)

Minister of Education of British Columbia
- In office November 25, 2010 – March 14, 2011
- Premier: Gordon Campbell
- Preceded by: George Abbott
- Succeeded by: George Abbott

Minister of Labour, Citizens' Services and Open Government of British Columbia
- In office September 26, 2011 – September 5, 2012
- Premier: Christy Clark
- Preceded by: Stephanie Cadieux
- Succeeded by: Pat Bell (Minister Responsible for Labour)

Minister of Health of British Columbia
- In office September 5, 2012 – June 10, 2013
- Premier: Christy Clark
- Preceded by: Michael de Jong
- Succeeded by: Terry Lake

Personal details
- Born: 1957 or 1958 (age 68–69)
- Party: BC Liberal
- Education: Memorial University of Newfoundland; Queen's University
- Profession: Physician

Margaret MacDiarmid is a Canadian politician and physician. She was a member of the Legislative Assembly (MLA) of British Columbia for the riding of Vancouver-Fairview from 2009 to 2013. A caucus member of the British Columbia Liberal Party, she served in several cabinet posts under premiers Gordon Campbell and Christy Clark.

== Biography ==
She was originally from Saskatchewan, where her father worked as a general practitioner in the town of Shaunavon. She lived in Salt Lake City, England and Winnipeg through her childhood and teenage years, then studied science at the Memorial University of Newfoundland before attending medical school at Queen's University. She worked in Toronto before moving with her husband Robert to Rossland, British Columbia in 1989, where she practised as a family physician. She was a member of the board of the British Columbia Medical Association for 12 years, serving as president from 2006 to 2007.

MacDiarmid ran as a candidate for the British Columbia Liberal Party in the October 2008 by-election for the provincial riding of Vancouver-Fairview, which took place as a result of incumbent MLA Gregor Robertson's decision to resign his seat in order to run for mayor of Vancouver at the 2008 municipal election. She lost to British Columbia New Democratic Party (BC NDP) candidate Jenn McGinn. In a rematch for the Fairview seat at the 2009 provincial election, MacDiarmid defeated McGinn to become the riding's MLA, and was appointed to the cabinet by Premier Gordon Campbell in June 2009 to serve as Minister of Education and Minister Responsible for Early Learning and Literacy.

In November 2009, MacDiarmid was rushed to Peace Arch Hospital for emergency treatment and transferred to Royal Columbian Hospital for intensive care for pneumococcal meningitis. She recovered and was re-assigned as Minister of Tourism, Trade and Investment and Minister Responsible for the Intergovernmental Relations Secretariat in October 2010. With George Abbott resigning as Minister of Education in November 2010 to contest the Liberal Party leadership, MacDiarmid additionally took on the education portfolio.

After Christy Clark took over as premier in March 2011, MacDiarmid was initially without a cabinet post, until her appointment as Minister of Labour, Citizens' Services and Open Government that September; she was then re-assigned as Minister of Health in September 2012.

In 2012, Mike de Jong's Ministry of Health fired seven ministry workers without cause. MacDiarmid, as his freshly appointed replacement, claimed that the Royal Canadian Mounted Police (RCMP) was investigating what she referred to as their misconduct; it emerged in 2015 that the RCMP had not conducted any criminal investigation due to lack of evidence. The matter in its entirety was referred to the Ombudsperson of British Columbia, who in 2017 issued a report titled "Misfire: The 2012 Ministry Of Health Employment Terminations and Related Matters". The Ombudsperson recommended that by May 31, 2017, the government of British Columbia "make a public statement that acknowledges and apologizes for the harm caused by the Ministry of Health investigations and the decisions".

Following her defeat in the 2013 provincial election by BC NDP candidate George Heyman, she was appointed to the board of directors for Vancouver Coastal Health Authority, serving from 2013 to 2017.

== Electoral results ==
2013 British Columbia general election: Vancouver-Fairview
Party	Candidate	Votes	%
New Democratic	George Heyman	12,649	47.32
Liberal	Margaret MacDiarmid	11,298	42.26
Green	Matthew Pedley	2,785	10.42
Total valid votes		26,732	100.00
Total rejected ballots		220	0.82
Turnout		26,952	58.98
Source: Elections BC

2009 British Columbia general election: Vancouver-Fairview
Party	Candidate	Votes	%	Expenditures
Liberal	Margaret MacDiarmid	11,034	47.09	$144,364
New Democratic	Jenn McGinn	9,881	42.17	$106,859
Green	Vanessa Violini	2,232	9.52	$749
Independent	Graham Clark	165	0.70	$250
Reform	Norris Matthew Barens	85	0.36	$250
Refederation	Alex Frei	37	0.16	$260
Total valid votes		23,434	100.00	
Total rejected ballots		152	0.64	
Turnout		23,586	56.50	
Registered voters		41,748		
Source: Elections BC

By-election, October 29, 2008: Vancouver-Fairview
Party	Candidate	Votes	%	±	Expenditures
NDP	Jenn McGinn	5,752	46.98		$70,030
Liberal	Margaret MacDiarmid	4,936	40.32		$92,092
Green	Jane Sterk	900	7.35	–	$7,773
Conservative	Wilf Hanni	489	3.99		$6,886
Marijuana	Jodie Emery	166	1.36		$430
Total valid votes		12,243	100%		
Total rejected ballots		29	0.24%		
Turnout		12,272	26.93%		
