= Cannabis Culture (magazine) =

Canadian magazine

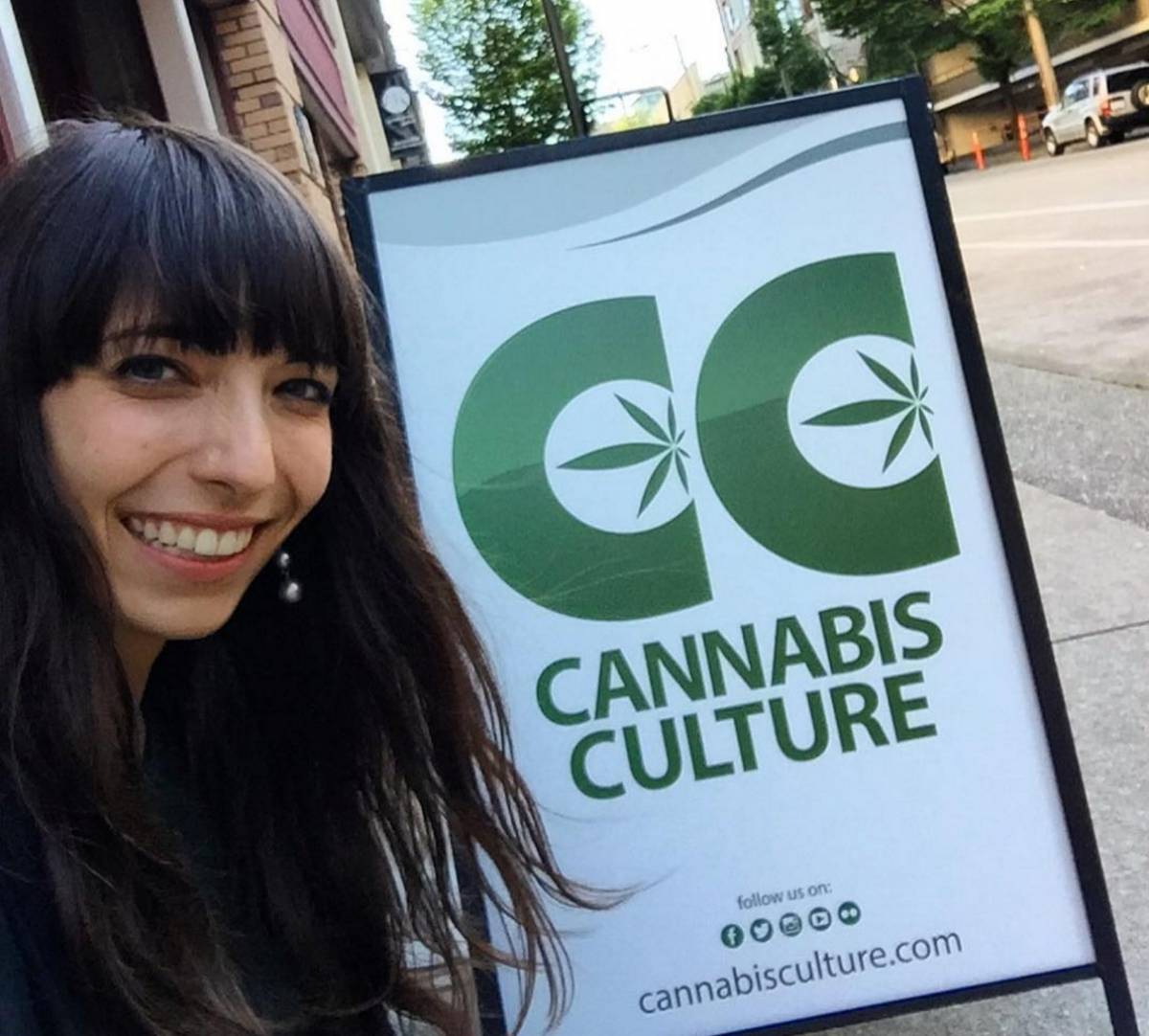
- Jodie Giesz-Ramsay outside a Cannabis Culture store
- Editor: Jodie Emery
- Categories: Online Magazine
- Publisher: Jodie Emery
- Founded: 1995; 31 years ago
- Final issue: 2009; 17 years ago (Print)
- Country: Canada
- Language: English
- Website: cannabisculture.com

Cannabis Culture is a Canadian online magazine and former print magazine devoted to cannabis and the worldwide cannabis culture. Cannabis Culture publishes stories about the struggle to legalize marijuana, profiles of marijuana paraphernalia, articles on how to grow marijuana, interviews with prominent marijuana users, and coverage of cannabis cultural events like the Australian Nimbin MardiGrass festival and the High Times Cannabis Cup. The publication has been owned and operated by Jodie Giesz-Ramsay (formerly Jodie Emery) since 2010.

== History ==
The magazine was founded in the summer of 1994 by Marc Emery, a prominent Canadian marijuana legalization activist who was the president of the BC Marijuana Party and well known as the "Prince of Pot". Cannabis Culture magazine evolved from a publication called "The Marijuana & Hemp Newsletter" launched by Emery in 1994. For the first three years, the magazine was named Cannabis Canada but changed its name to Cannabis Culture with issue number 13, released in July 1998.

The editor of the magazine for the first ten years was Dana Larsen, who left the magazine in April 2005, after issue 54. The magazine thrived under Larsen with the help of the magazine's two regular writers, Pete Brady and Reverend Damuzi.

The print version of Cannabis Culture was printed in Canada and had a distribution of close to 100,000 copies across North America.

In 2000, Cannabis Culture was pulled off store shelves in Timmins, Ontario, Canada. Local police told retailers that it was illegal because it was a "crime comic". Publisher Marc Emery flew to Timmins and gave away copies in front of the police station, and ultimately the police apologized.

Because it promotes the use and cultivation of marijuana, Cannabis Culture magazine is banned in some countries, such as Australia, and has had problems with New Zealand customs.

In March 2009, Cannabis Culture ceased publication of its print version to devote its resources to its online version, an active website originally launched in March 1995.

Cannabis Culture also hosts an active discussion forum and is the sister site to the Pot TV Network.

On May 10, 2010, Emery was ordered to surrender to authorities and was deported to the United States.

Marc's ex-wife, Jodie Giesz-Ramsay, has been the owner and operator of Cannabis Culture since 2010. Marc has had no involvement in the brand since 2016.
