= Jodie Emery =

Canadian cannabis rights activist and politician (born 1985)

Jodie Giesz-Ramsay
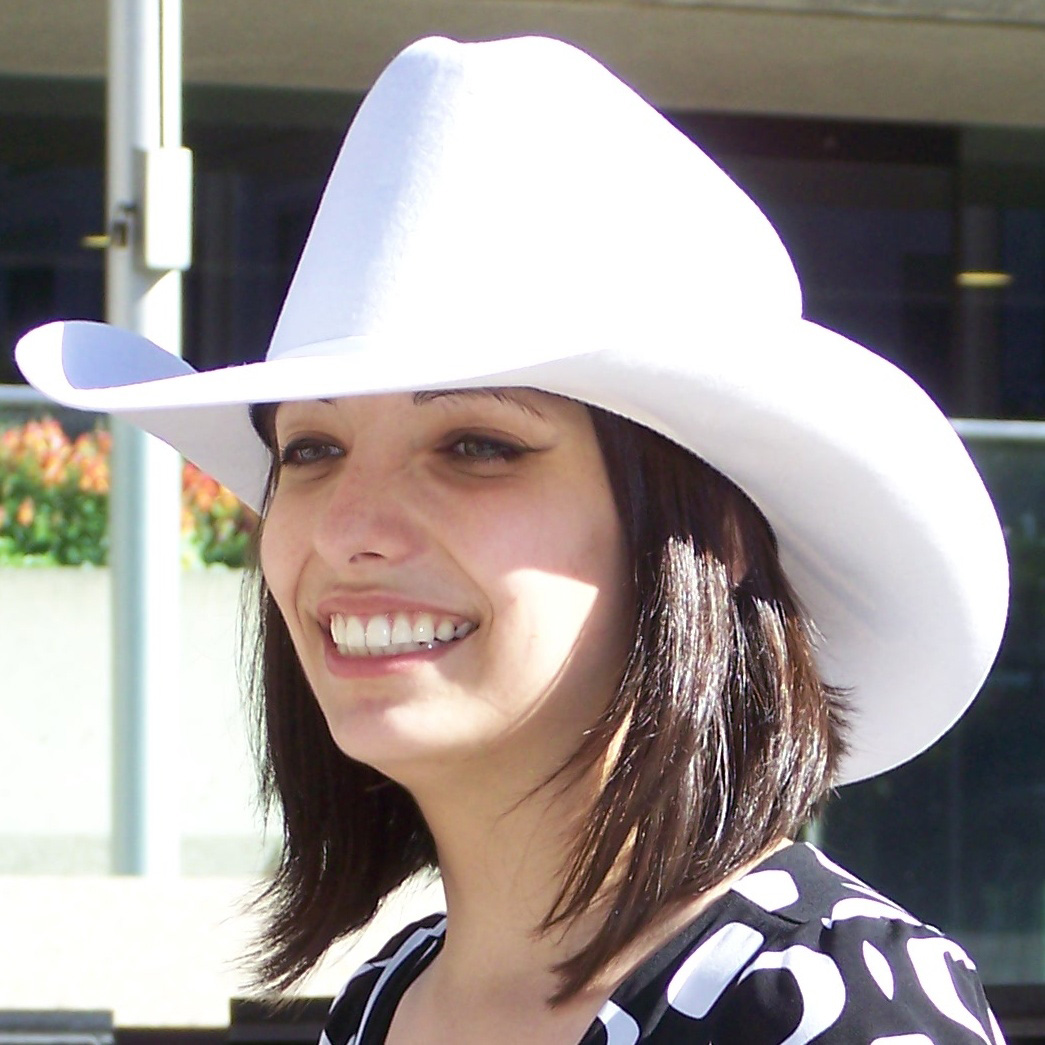
- Jodie Emery in Calgary (2007)
- Born: January 4, 1985 (age 41); Kamloops, British Columbia
- Other name: Princess of Pot
- Occupations: Politician, activist
- Known for: Cannabis legalisation
- Political party: Liberal Party of Canada, B.C. Green Party, B.C. Marijuana Party

Jodie Giesz-Ramsay (formerly Jodie Emery) (born January 4, 1985) is a Canadian cannabis rights activist and politician. She is the former spouse of fellow activist Marc Emery. Until the business was shut down by police, the couple were co-owners of Cannabis Culture, a business that franchised pot dispensaries, later deemed to be illegal. They had obtained the cannabis from illegal sources, according to Crown prosecutors. They are the former operators and owners of Cannabis Culture magazine and Pot TV.

She has run on a cannabis legalization platform for the Green Party of British Columbia, and the British Columbia Marijuana Party. in 2014 she unsuccessfully sought the federal Liberal Party nomination for the riding of Vancouver East.

== Early life ==
Emery was born and raised in Kamloops, BC, and graduated from St. Michael's University School in Victoria, British Columbia. She moved to Vancouver in 2004. She and Marc Emery married on July 23, 2006.

== Current activism ==
She is the owner of Cannabis Culture Magazine, Pot TV, Cannabis Culture Lounge and Cannabis Culture Headquarters, and a hemp-themed coffeeshop model called Jodie’s Joint.

== Past activism ==
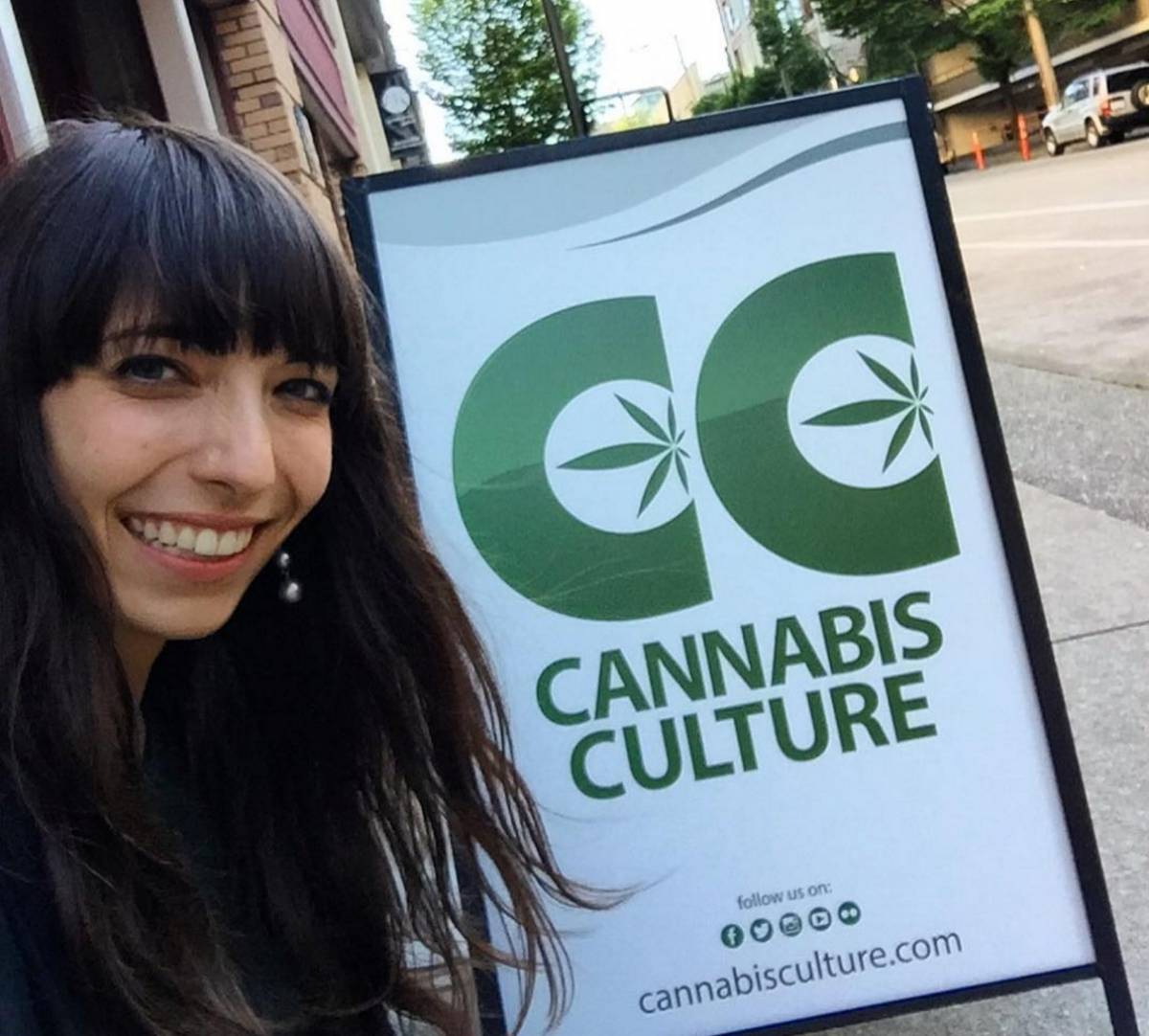
Outside a Cannabis Culture store in 2016

As the editor of Cannabis Culture magazine, she has been active in cannabis legalisation movements worldwide since 2004.

She began her activism working for Marc Emery helping pack mail order cannabis as a teenager, and was later hired as assistant editor of Cannabis Culture magazine in early 2005. Emery has spoken regularly at "4/20", "Cannabis Day" and Global Marijuana March rallies in Vancouver and Toronto, as well as other events in Canada and the United States, including Moses Znaimer's Idea City conference in June 2012 and 2014, the New Hampshire Liberty Forum in February 2012, Canadian University Press conference in 2010, Canadian Investors Conference in 2014, Boston Freedom Rally in 2012 and 2013, and the Burgundy Luncheon Club in 2011.

Emery testified in favour of legalization at the Washington state legislature in 2011, and participated in marijuana legalization initiatives in California in November 2010 and Washington State in 2012. She was part of a national press conference hosted by Stop the Violence BC in April 2012 featuring former British Columbia attorney general Geoffrey Plant, Dr. Evan Wood, and the United States prosecutor of her husband, John McKay.

During her husband's five year incarceration beginning in 2010 in the United States, Emery was active seeking the repatriation of her husband back to Canada, including protests at Conservative Party constituency offices in 2010, including the Calgary office of Prime Minister Stephen Harper, and holding a press conference inside Parliament alongside three Members of Parliament in October 2013.

Emery produced a weekly video broadcast called The Jodie Emery Show from 2010 to 2014. In 2014, Emery appeared in the Trailer Park Boys film "Don't Legalize It". Other film appearances include the documentaries "Evergreen: the Road to Legalization", "Prince of Pot: The US vs Marc Emery", "A NORML Life", and "Legalize It".

== Criminal charges ==
Jodie and Marc Emery were both arrested in Montreal, and subsequently released on December 16, 2016 after opening several new Cannabis Culture dispensaries in that city. At one time, there were 19 Cannabis Culture dispensaries in operation, in British Columbia, Ontario and Quebec.

On March 8, 2017, the couple was arrested at Pearson International Airport and the Cannabis Culture shops were raided, leading to charges on a number of offences. The charges against 17 employees were withdrawn, but Jodie Emery was convicted of possession of marijuana for the purpose of trafficking and possession of proceeds of crime over $5,000.

Marc Emery was convicted of possession of marijuana for purpose of trafficking, trafficking marijuana and possession of proceeds of crime more than $5,000. They were required to pay fines ($150,000 and a $45,000 victim surcharge) and placed on two year probation. After a guilty plea, the couple was convicted of drug related charges on December 18, 2017, fined and placed on two years probation. Three other individuals were also convicted of drug-related charges. The couple had claimed that the operation of pot shops was a form of civil disobedience, but Justice Leslie Chapin ruled as follows: "No doubt there were pro social motivations that were behind the actions, but at the same time, I have to recognize that much profit was made".

== In the media ==
Since 2004, Emery has been featured in the mainstream media. She has had many letters to the editor published in newspapers across Canada, and has written for the National Post, Huffington Post, and The Guardian UK. Her activism has led to hundreds of interviews on local, provincial and national television and radio.

Emery has been interviewed and profiled in newspapers and magazines in the United States and Canada, including Maclean's magazine, Fresh Magazine, Elle Canada magazine, the Globe and Mail, National Post, and the Georgia Straight.

From 2013 to 2014, Emery was a regular participant on the Global TV's BC1 channel show "Unfiltered" with Jill Krop, providing opinions on a wide range of current events and news stories.

== Political career ==
Emery regularly comments on issues beyond legalization, usually through her Twitter account. She advocates for non-violence, tax spending reform, electoral reform, environmental awareness, policing and prison reform, and affordable education. She ran for provincial office as a B.C. Marijuana Party candidate in 2005, and again in a 2008 by-election.

She ran as a candidate for the BC Green Party in the May 2009 election, coming in third, losing to Liberal Party member Kash Heed. During the campaign, she was the BC Green Party's Policing and Crime Critic, and was elected as a Director-At-Large at the 2010 BC Green Party Annual General Meeting. She ran again in the 2013 general election for the BC Green Party in Vancouver-West End, finishing with 11.39% of the vote.

Emery unsuccessfully filed her intention to seek the nomination for the Liberal Party in the riding of Vancouver East, held in Parliament by NDP MP Libby Davies, who announced she would not run in the 2015 federal election.

== Electoral record ==
2013 British Columbia general election: Vancouver-West End
Party	Candidate	Votes	%	±%	Expenditures
New Democratic	Spencer Chandra Herbert	10,755	56.81	+0.30	$80,612
Liberal	Scott Harrison	5,349	28.25	−4.40	$27,424
Green	Jodie Emery	2,156	11.39	+2.38	$3,295
Libertarian	John Clarke	446	2.36	+1.24	$250
No Affiliation	Ronald Guillermo Herbert	132	0.70	–	$361
Work Less	Mathew David Kagis	94	0.50	–	$250
Total valid votes		18,932	100.00	–	
Total rejected ballots		112	0.59	+0.05	
Turnout		19,044	50.64	+0.71	
Registered voters		37,609			
Source: Elections BC

2009 British Columbia general election: Vancouver-Fraserview
Party	Candidate	Votes	%	±%	Expenditures
Liberal	Kash Heed	9,549	49.29	+1.49	$105,420
New Democratic	Gabriel Yiu	8,801	45.43	+3.00	$97,038
Green	Jodie Emery	904	4.67	-1.97	$8,279
Refederation	Andrew Stevano	118	0.61	–	$260
Total valid votes		19,372	99.10		
Total rejected, unmarked and declined ballots		175	0.90		
Turnout		19,547	51.09		

British Columbia provincial by-election, October 29, 2008: Vancouver-Fairview Resignation of Gregor Robertson
Party	Candidate	Votes	%	Expenditures
New Democratic	Jenn McGinn	5,752	46.98	$70,030
Liberal	Margaret MacDiarmid	4,936	40.32	$92,092
Green	Jane Sterk	900	7.35	$7,773
Conservative	Wilf Hanni	489	3.99	$6,886
Marijuana	Jodie Emery	166	1.36	$430
Total valid votes		12,243	99.76	
Total rejected, unmarked and declined ballots		29	0.24	
Turnout		12,272	26.93	

== Personal life ==
Jodie Emery married Marc Emery in 2006, divorcing on their 15th anniversary in 2021. They had been separated from approximately 2017.
