= Vancouver-Renfrew =

Provincial electoral district in British Columbia, Canada

British Columbia electoral district
- Interactive map of riding boundaries

Provincial electoral district
- Legislature: Legislative Assembly of British Columbia
MLA
Adrian Dix
New Democratic
- First contested: 1991
- Last contested: 2026

Demographics
- Population (2021): 56,922
- Area (km²): 8
- Pop. density (per km²): 7,115.3
- Census division: Metro Vancouver
- Census subdivision: Vancouver (part)

Vancouver-Renfrew (formerly Vancouver-Kingsway) is a provincial electoral district for the Legislative Assembly of British Columbia.

Created under the 1991 British Columbia electoral redistribution, the district was first contested in the 1991 general election. Formed from parts of Vancouver East, the district adopted its current name and underwent modest boundary adjustments for the 2024 election, which implemented the results of the 2021 redistribution.

== Demographics ==
Population, 2021	56,922
Area (km^{2})	8
Pop. density (people per km^{2})	7,115
Source: BC Electoral Boundaries Commission

== Geography ==
Located in Vancouver, the district comprises the Renfrew–Collingwood neighbourhood and Trout Lake. It extends east to Boundary Road and is bordered by Kingsway to the south.

== Members of the Legislative Assembly ==
This riding has elected the following members of the Legislative Assembly:

Assembly	Years	Member	Party
Vancouver-Kingsway; Riding created from Vancouver East
35th	1991–1996	Glen Clark	New Democratic
36th	1996–2001	Glen Clark	New Democratic
37th	2001–2005	Rob Nijjar	Liberal
38th	2005–2009	Adrian Dix	New Democratic
39th	2009–2013	Adrian Dix	New Democratic
40th	2013–2017	Adrian Dix	New Democratic
41st	2017–2020	Adrian Dix	New Democratic
42nd	2020–2024	Adrian Dix	New Democratic
Vancouver-Renfrew
43rd	2024–2026	Adrian Dix	New Democratic
44th	2026–present	Adrian Dix	New Democratic

== Election results ==
2026 British Columbia general election
Party	Candidate	Votes	%	±%	Expenditures
New Democratic	Adrian Dix	7,708	54.44	-8.76	
Conservative	Tom Ikonomou	4,409	31.14	+0.44	
Green	Rebecca Haber	1,675	11.83	+5.73	
CentreBC	Lisa Prescott	314	2.22	-	
Total valid votes		14,106	99.63		
Total rejected ballots		52	0.37		
Turnout					
Registered voters					
New Democratic hold		Swing		-4.60	
Source: Elections BC

2024 British Columbia general election
Party	Candidate	Votes	%	±%	Expenditures
New Democratic	Adrian Dix	10,983	63.2%	−4.61	
Conservative	Tom Ikonomou	5,327	30.7%	–	
Green	Lawrence Taylor	1,064	6.1%	−3.06	
Total valid votes		17,374	–		
Total rejected ballots					
Turnout					
Registered voters					
Source: Elections BC

2020 British Columbia general election: Vancouver-Kingsway
Party	Candidate	Votes	%	±%	Expenditures
New Democratic	Adrian Dix	12,297	67.81	+7.18	$28,463.86
Liberal	Cole Anderson	3,919	21.61	−5.48	$1,200.00
Green	Scott Bernstein	1,662	9.16	−0.15	$1,539.01
Libertarian	Karin Litzcke	257	1.42	–	$0.00
Total valid votes		18,135	100.00	–	
Total rejected ballots		175	0.96	+0.09	
Turnout		18,310	44.50	−8.85	
Registered voters		41,144			
New Democratic hold		Swing		+6.33	
Source: Elections BC

2017 British Columbia general election: Vancouver-Kingsway
Party	Candidate	Votes	%	±%	Expenditures
New Democratic	Adrian Dix	12,031	60.63	+3.86	$63,235
Liberal	Trang Nguyen	5,377	27.09	−8.32	$49,362
Green	Ellisa Calder	1,848	9.31	+2.04	$1,244
Conservative	Charles Bae	504	2.54	–	$855
Your Political Party	Brette Mullins	85	0.43	–	$1,053
Total valid votes		19,845	100.00	–	
Total rejected ballots		174	0.87	−0.44	
Turnout		20,019	53.35	+4.39	
Registered voters		37,521			
Source: Elections BC

2013 British Columbia general election: Vancouver-Kingsway
Party	Candidate	Votes	%	±%	Expenditures
New Democratic	Adrian Dix	10,409	56.77	+1.60	$139,024
Liberal	Gurjit Dhillon	6,600	35.99	−5.97	$40,883
Green	Gregory Dale Esau	1,327	7.24	+3.06	$250
Total valid votes		18,336	100.00		
Total rejected ballots		244	1.31		
Turnout		18,580	48.96		
Source: Elections BC

2011 British Columbia sales tax referendum
Side	Votes	%
Yes	13,701	72.45%
No	5,211	27.55%

2009 British Columbia general election: Vancouver-Kingsway
Party	Candidate	Votes	%	Expenditures
New Democratic	Adrian Dix	9,229	55.17	$87,767
Liberal	Bill Yuen	6,518	38.96	$69,706
Green	Rev Warkentin	699	4.18	$353
Libertarian	Matt Kadioglu	171	1.02	$250
People's Front	Charles Boylan	122	0.67	$250
Total valid votes		16,739	100.00	
Total rejected ballots		215	1.27	
Turnout		16,944	46.99	

2009 British Columbia electoral reform referendum
Side	Votes	%
First-past-the-post	9,309	59.98%
BC-STV	6,211	40.02%

2005 British Columbia general election: Vancouver-Kingsway
Party	Candidate	Votes	%	Expenditures
New Democratic	Adrian Dix	10,038	51.44	$84,411
Liberal	Rob Nijjar	7,894	40.46	$115,864
Green	Stuart Mackinnon	1,212	6.21	$4,556
Marijuana	Steven Mackenzie Lay	219	1.12	$100
People's Front	Donna Petersen	77	0.39	$103
Sex	Yvonne Maylynne Tink	73	0.37	$100
Total valid votes		19,513	100	
Total rejected ballots		239	1.22	
Turnout		19,752	54.19	

2005 British Columbia electoral reform referendum
Side	Votes	%
Yes	9,974	53.87%
No	8,541	46.13%

2001 British Columbia general election
Party	Candidate	Votes	%	±	Expenditures
Liberal	Rob Nijjar	8,264	49.89%		$41,856
NDP	Alicia Barsallo	5,429	32.78%		$41,185
Green	Geoff Lyon	1,725	10.41%	–	$468
Unity	Sal Vetro	541	3.27%		$2,569
Marijuana	Steven Mackenzie Lay	364	2.20%		$394
Council of British Columbians	Tyler Ducharme	159	0.96%		$3,268
People's Front	Donna Petersen	81	0.49%		$767
Total valid votes		16,563	100.00%		
Total rejected ballots		188	1.14%		
Turnout		16,751	67.14%		

1996 British Columbia general election
Party	Candidate	Votes	%	±	Expenditures
NDP	Glen Clark	10,525	55.46%		$35,297
Liberal	Francis Ho	6,997	36.87%		$43,041
Progressive Democrat	Julia Marks	518	4.80%	–	$1,087
Reform	Graham Norton	367	1.93%		$1,558
Green	Marilyn Hogan	264	1.39%	–	$100
Libertarian	Randy Eremko	98	0.52%		$160
Social Credit	Patrick S. Saunders	75	0.40%	–	$3,339
Independent	Protais Haje	69	0.36%		$972
Natural Law	Steven R. Beck	65	0.34%		$136
Total valid votes		18,978	100.00%		
Total rejected ballots		257	1.34%		
Turnout		19,235	71.07%		

1991 British Columbia general election
Party	Candidate	Votes	%	±	Expenditures
NDP	Glen Clark	9,292	54.79%		$43,714
Liberal	Elaine M. White	4,390	25.88%		$1,896
Social Credit	Christie Jung	3,112	18.35%	–	$16,483
Green	Michael G. Horn	137	0.81%	–	$14
Non-affiliated (Communist League)	Ned W. Dmytryshyn	29	0.17%		$247
Total valid votes		16,960	100.00%		
Total rejected ballots		599	3.41%		
Turnout		17,559	70.85%		

=== 1991 recall referendum ===
1991 British Columbia recall and initiative referendum
Side	Votes	%
Yes	13,033	86.16%
No	2,093	13.84%

=== 1991 initiative referendum ===
1991 British Columbia recall and initiative referendum
Side	Votes	%
Yes	12,688	87.26%
No	1,852	12.74%

== Student vote results ==
Student Vote Canada is a non-partisan program that holds mock elections in Canadian elementary and secondary schools alongside general elections, with the same candidates and electoral system.

2024 British Columbia general election
Party	Candidate	Votes	%	±%
New Democratic	Adrian Dix	648	49.88	–
Conservative	Tom Ikonomou	372	28.64	–
Green	Lawrence Taylor	279	21.48	–
Total valid votes		1,299	100.0	–
Source: Student Vote Canada

== See also ==
- List of British Columbia provincial electoral districts
- Canadian provincial electoral districts

Legislative Assembly of British Columbia
Preceded by Vancouver-Mount Pleasant	Constituency represented by the premier of British Columbia; 1996–1999	Succeeded by North Coast
