= Jenn McGinn =

Canadian politician

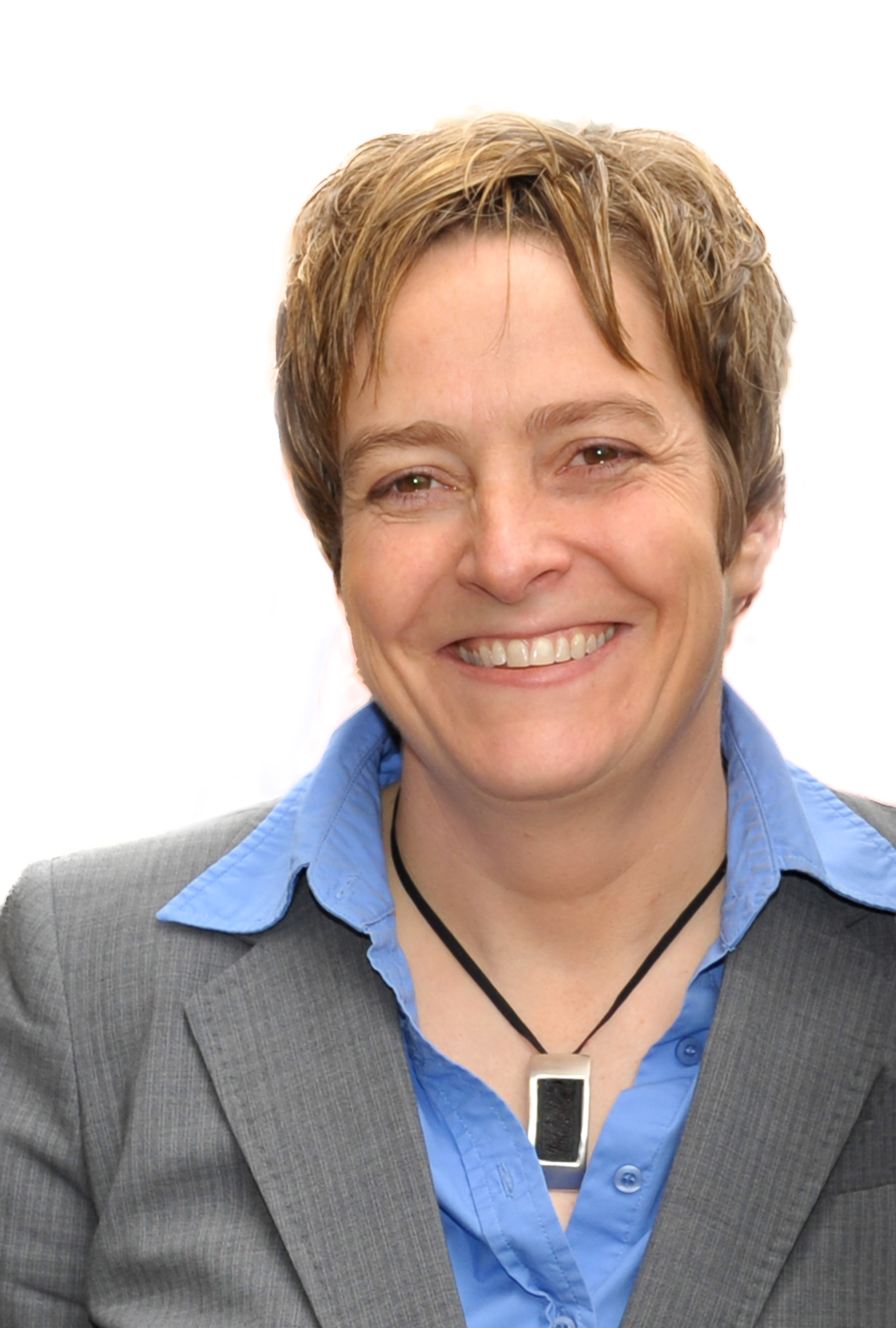
- McGinn in 2008

Member of the British Columbia Legislative Assembly for Vancouver-Fairview
- In office October 29, 2008 – May 12, 2009
- Preceded by: Gregor Robertson
- Succeeded by: Margaret MacDiarmid

Personal details
- Born: Charlottetown, Prince Edward Island
- Party: British Columbia New Democratic Party
- Other political affiliations: Coalition of Progressive Electors
- Occupation: account manager

Jenn McGinn is a Canadian politician who served as a member of the Legislative Assembly of British Columbia (MLA) from 2008 to 2009, representing the electoral district of Vancouver-Fairview as part of the British Columbia New Democratic Party (NDP) caucus. She is the first openly lesbian MLA in British Columbia.

== Biography ==
Born in Prince Edward Island, McGinn first became involved in politics as a high school student in Charlottetown in the late 1980s. She joined the NDP at 17 years old, then became president of the P.E.I. Young New Democrats. She moved to Vancouver in 1993, and worked in various roles such as vice-president of the Little Mountain Neighbourhood House, director of development for the Surrey Women's Centre, and executive director of the South Granville Seniors Centre.

She ran as a Coalition of Progressive Electors candidate for Vancouver Park Board commissioner in the 2005 municipal election, but was unsuccessful. She subsequently worked as an account manager with the community business banking team of Vancity Savings Credit Union prior to entering provincial politics.

After Vancouver-Fairview MLA Gregor Robertson resigned his seat to run in the 2008 mayoral election, McGinn was nominated as the NDP candidate for the ensuing by-election; her candidacy was endorsed in a Georgia Straight editorial. She was elected to the legislature by defeating BC Liberal candidate Margaret MacDiarmid in the October 2008 by-election, and served as opposition critic for Community Living BC in the 38th Parliament.

After the 2008 by-election the boundaries of Vancouver-Fairview were redrawn by Elections BC as part of a larger province-wide redistribution. McGinn once again faced MacDiarmid in the 2009 provincial election, but this time lost to the latter; she returned to Vancity following her electoral defeat.

== Electoral record ==
By-election, October 29, 2008: Vancouver-Fairview
| Party | Candidate | Votes | % | ±% |
|---|---|---|---|---|
| NDP | Jenn McGinn | 5,487 | 46.66 | |
| Liberal | Margaret MacDiarmid | 4,779 | 40.64 | |
| Green | Jane Sterk | 856 | 7.28 | – |
| Conservative | Wilf Hanni | 483 | 4.11 | |
| Marijuana | Jodie Emery | 155 | 1.32 | |

2009 British Columbia general election: Vancouver-Fairview
| Party | Candidate | Votes | % | Expenditures |
|---|---|---|---|---|
| Liberal | Margaret MacDiarmid | 11,034 | 47.09 | $144,364 |
| New Democratic | Jenn McGinn | 9,881 | 42.17 | $106,859 |
| Green | Vanessa Violini | 2,232 | 9.52 | $749 |
| Independent | Graham Clark | 165 | 0.70 | $250 |
| Reform | Norris Matthew Barens | 85 | 0.36 | $250 |
| Refederation | Alex Frei | 37 | 0.16 | $260 |
| Total valid votes | | 23,434 | 100.00 | |
| Total rejected ballots | | 152 | 0.64 | |
| Turnout | | 23,586 | 56.50 | |
| Registered voters | | 41,748 | | |
Source: Elections BC
