= Prince George North =

Defunct provincial electoral district in British Columbia, Canada

Prince George North was a provincial electoral district for the Legislative Assembly of British Columbia, Canada, from 1979 to 2009.

== Demographics ==
Population, 2001	36,696
Population change, 1996–2001	-4.5%
Area (km^{2})	56,431
Population density (people per km^{2})	0.65

== Members of the Legislative Assembly ==
The last member of the Legislative Assembly (MLA) was the Hon. Pat Bell. He was first elected in 2001 and represented the British Columbia Liberal Party. Mr. Bell was appointed Minister of State for Mining on January 26, 2004, and on June 16, 2005, after the 2005 election, was appointed the Minister of Agriculture and Lands.

- John Heinrich, Social Credit (1979–1986)
- Lois Boone, NDP (1986–1991)
- Paul Ramsey, NDP (1991–2001)
- Pat Bell, Liberal (2001–2009)

== Election results ==
B.C. General Election 1991: Prince George North
Party	Candidate	Votes	%	±	Expenditures
New Democratic	Paul Ramsey	5,468	38.74%		$19,464
Liberal	John Mangan	4,506	31.93%		$4,028
Social Credit	Keith Thompson	4,139	29.33%	–	$28,770
Total valid votes		14,113	100%		
Total rejected ballots		218	1.52%		
Turnout		14,331	71.58%		

B.C. General Election 1996: Prince George North
Party	Candidate	Votes	%	±	Expenditures
NDP	Paul Ramsey	5,837	39.58%		$32,817
Liberal	Bob Viergever	4,923	33.38%		$47,977
Reform	Ron Hirvi	2,430	16.48%		$15,529
Progressive Democrat	Adele Graber	891	6.04%	–	$1,199
Independent	Ken Benham	495	3.36%		$868
Green	Carolyn Linden	173	1.17%	–	$100
Total valid votes		14,749	100%		
Total rejected ballots		117	0.79%		
Turnout		14,866	66.75%		

B.C. General Election 2001: Prince George North
Party	Candidate	Votes	%	±	Expenditures
Liberal	Pat Bell	9,215	61.02%		$43,559
New Democratic	Bryan Llewellyn	2,148	14.22%		$6,552
Green	Hilary Crowley	1,137	7.53%	–	$2,866
Unity	David G. Low	838	5.55%		$267
Western Reform	Lisa Maskell	621	4.11%		$8,195
Marijuana	Robert Grimsrud	588	3.89%		$500
Independent	Fred McLeod	478	3.17%		$854
Independent	Leif Jensen	76	0.51%		$100
Total valid votes		15,101	100%		
Total rejected ballots		68	0.45%		
Turnout		15,169	71.77%		

2005 British Columbia general election
Party	Candidate	Votes	%	Expenditures
Liberal	Pat Bell	7,697	49.93	$78,884
New Democratic	Deborah Poff	5,598	36.32	$55,244
Green	Denis L. Gendron	1,201	7.79	$3,421
Independent	Leif Jensen	443	2.87	$2,823
Democratic Reform	Mike Mann	241	1.56	$2,124
Marijuana	Steve Wolfe	235	1.52	$100
Total valid votes		15,415	100	
Total rejected ballots		64	0.42	
Turnout		15,479	61.55	

== See also ==
- List of British Columbia provincial electoral districts
- Canadian provincial electoral districts
