= Adrian Dix =

Canadian politician (born 1964)

Adrian Dix MLA
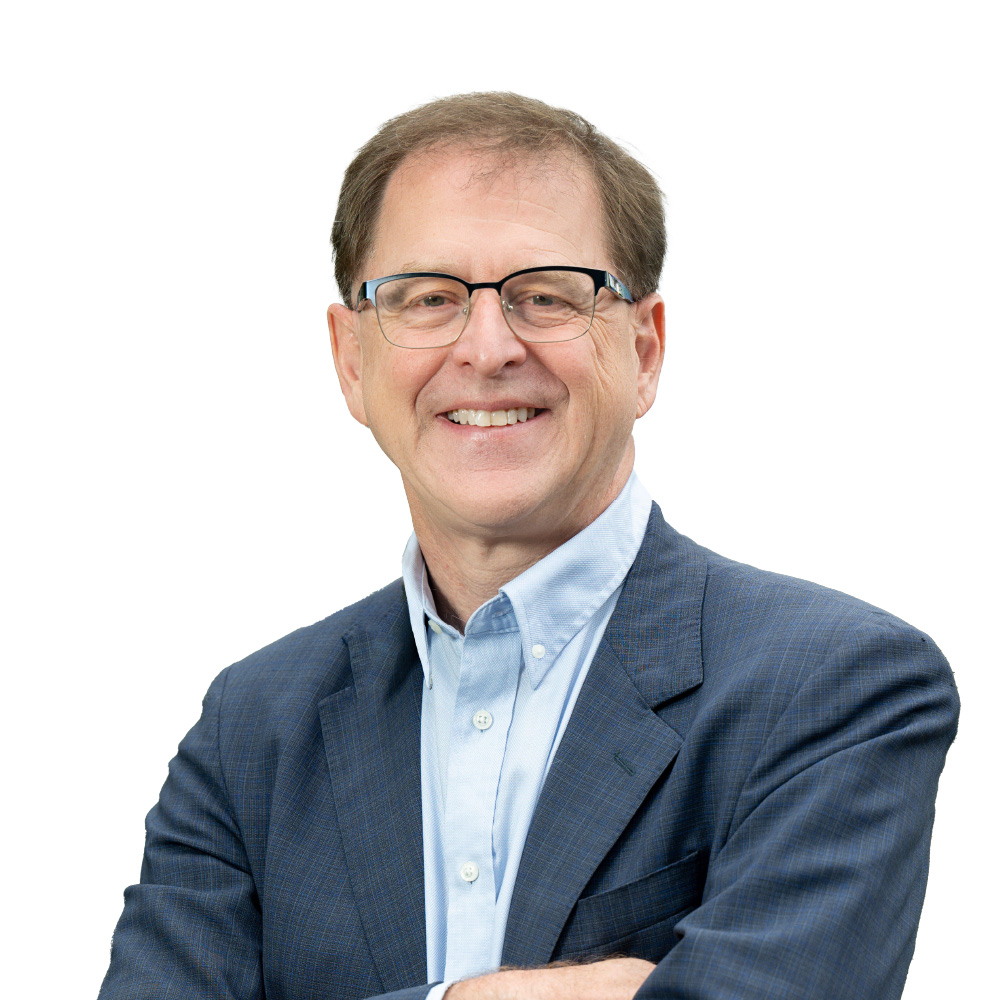
- Dix in 2024

Leader of the Opposition of British Columbia
- In office April 17, 2011 – May 4, 2014
- Preceded by: Dawn Black
- Succeeded by: John Horgan

Leader of the British Columbia New Democratic Party
- In office April 17, 2011 – May 4, 2014
- Preceded by: Dawn Black
- Succeeded by: John Horgan
Ministerial positions
Minister of Energy and Climate Solutions of British Columbia
In office November 18, 2024 – November 20, 2026
Premier	David Eby
Preceded by	Josie Osborne (Energy, Mines and Low Carbon Innovation)
Minister responsible for Francophone Affairs of British Columbia
Incumbent
Assumed office September 27, 2017
Premier	John Horgan; David Eby
Minister of Health of British Columbia
In office July 18, 2017 – November 18, 2024
Premier	John Horgan; David Eby
Preceded by	Mary Polak
Succeeded by	Josie Osborne

Member of the British Columbia Legislative Assembly for Vancouver-Renfrew Vancouver-Kingsway (2005–2024)
- Incumbent
- Assumed office May 17, 2005
- Preceded by: Rob Nijjar

Personal details
- Born: April 20, 1964 (age 62) Vancouver, British Columbia, Canada
- Party: New Democratic
- Spouse: Renée Saklikar
- Education: University of British Columbia

Adrian Dix MLA (born April 20, 1964) is a Canadian politician who has served as a member of the Legislative Assembly of British Columbia (MLA) representing the electoral district of Vancouver-Renfrew (formerly known as Vancouver-Kingsway) since 2005. A member of the New Democratic Party, he served as the party's leader and leader of the Opposition in British Columbia from 2011 to 2014, resigning after losing the 2013 provincial election in an upset. From 2024 to 2026, he was the Minister of Energy and Climate Solutions and the Minister Responsible for Francophone Affairs. Previously, he served as the Minister of Health and Minister Responsible for Francophone Affairs from 2017 to 2024 under premiers John Horgan and David Eby.

== Personal life and education ==
Adrian Dix was born in Vancouver, to parents Ken and Hilda, immigrants from Ireland and Britain, respectively. His parents ran the Dix Insurance Agency Ltd. on West 41st Avenue in Vancouver until 2011 when his father retired and sold the business. Growing up in Vancouver, Dix was raised as an Anglican and attended both St. George's School and Point Grey Secondary. He then went on to study history and political science at the University of British Columbia. Dix has two siblings and currently lives in Vancouver with his wife Renée Saklikar, a poet and writer. Dix was diagnosed with Type-1 diabetes in his 20s. Fluently bilingual, Dix lived in France as a young man.

== Political career ==
=== Early career ===
Dix's first job in politics was as an aide to federal NDP MP Ian Waddell in Ottawa. In 1991, he returned to BC to become an assistant to Glen Clark in the provincial ministry of finance.

After Clark became Premier of British Columbia in 1996, Dix was named his chief of staff. Dix was dismissed in 1999 for back-dating a memo to protect Clark from conflict-of-interest charges. Dix has said of this incident, "It was wrong, it was wrong. I'm out there and I've admitted it and people will judge. But I'm not trying to hide my mistake." This memo would later become a focus of a number of opposition BC Liberal Party ads in the 2013 provincial election.

Subsequently, he went on to work as the executive director of Canadian Parents for French in their B.C./Yukon branch. The Vancouver Sun summarized his work in this position as "successfully encouraging more school boards to offer French immersion programs."

From 2001 to 2005 Dix was a political commentator in various media, writing a column for the Victoria Times-Colonist and The Source, a prominent intercultural newspaper in Vancouver. He was also a contributor to The Tyee and the CBC.

=== Entry into elective politics ===
In 2005, Dix was elected as the MLA for Vancouver-Kingsway. He first served as the opposition critic for Children and Families and then served as the Health critic. As MLA, he cites among his achievements "bringing insulin pumps to children with Type 1 diabetes and his work on a successful campaign to stop three schools from being closed in Vancouver-Kingsway."

=== Leader of the NDP ===
After NDP leader Carole James announced her resignation, Dix was one of several candidates to run for the leadership. The last candidate to publicly launch his leadership bid, Dix campaigned on a platform of eliminating the HST, rolling back reductions in the corporate tax rate, supporting the redirection of carbon tax revenue to pay for public transit and infrastructure that reduces greenhouse gas emissions, supporting an increase in the minimum wage rate to $10 per hour, creating a provincial child care system, restoring grants to the post-secondary students, reducing interest on student loans, and restoring the corporation capital tax on financial institutions.

His candidacy was endorsed by former interim BC NDP leader Joy MacPhail, amongst others.

Dix led throughout the voting, narrowly defeating rival Mike Farnworth on the third and final ballot with 51.8% of the vote.

Going into the 2013 election, nearly all polls showed the NDP well ahead of the BC Liberals, with at least one showing the NDP ahead by as much as 20 points. Two months prior to the election, The Province newspaper's front page featured a column by pundit Michael Smyth with the banner headline: "If This Man Kicked A Dog He Would Still Win The Election." However, in a result that shocked the party and political pundits, the BC Liberals won a fourth majority government. The BC NDP won 34 seats, one fewer than in 2009.

Dix announced on September 18, 2013, that he would resign as party leader once a new leader (John Horgan) would be chosen in 2014. He also announced his intention to run for re-election as an MLA in the next provincial election.

=== Cabinet minister ===
After the NDP formed government as a result of the 2017 election, Dix was appointed Minister of Health. After Horgan stepped down and was succeeded as premier by David Eby in 2022, Dix retained the portfolio in the new Eby ministry.

On August 30, 2021, Dix announced an initiative to bring 4000 housekeepers and food service workers in provincial hospitals back under government employment by March 2022. This was an effort to reverse the fallout of the British Columbia Liberal Party administration passing the Health and Social Services Delivery Improvement Act in January 2002. The act facilitated the contracting of hospital support jobs to private employers, leading to thousands of hospital support workers to be laid off from the public sector and rehired under private contractors for reduced wages and benefits. One employee reported an hourly wage decline from $18.10 with benefits and a pension while under direct provincial employment to $10.15 with neither benefits nor pensions under the private sector. The Hospital Employees' Union had also reported the halving of wages upon being contracted by the private sector. Additionally, Premier John Horgan noted that these wage declines disproportionately affected women.

Having served as health minister since 2017, Dix oversaw B.C.'s response to the COVID-19 pandemic but also faced sustained criticism for difficulties facing the provincial healthcare system. Following the 2024 election, in which healthcare was a major issue, Dix was shuffled out of the health file by Premier Eby and was named Minister of Energy and Climate Solutions and Minister Responsible for Francophone Affairs.

== Election history ==
=== Provincial elections ===
2026 British Columbia general election: Vancouver-Renfrew
Party	Candidate	Votes	%	±%	Expenditures
New Democratic	Adrian Dix	8,702	54.30		
Conservative	Tom Ikonomou	4,956	30.92		
Green	Rebecca Haber	1,949	12.16		
CentreBC	Lisa Prescott	351	2.19	—	
Total valid votes		15,958	99.58		
Total rejected ballots		68	0.42		
Turnout		16,026			
Registered voters					
New Democratic hold		Swing		−4.60	
Source: Elections BC

2024 British Columbia general election: Vancouver-Renfrew
Party	Candidate	Votes	%	±%	Expenditures
New Democratic	Adrian Dix	10,983	63.2%	−4.61	
Conservative	Tom Ikonomou	5,327	30.7%	–	
Green	Lawrence Taylor	1,064	6.1%	−3.06	
Total valid votes		17,374	–		
Total rejected ballots					
Turnout					
Registered voters					
Source: Elections BC

2020 British Columbia general election: Vancouver-Kingsway
Party	Candidate	Votes	%	±%	Expenditures
New Democratic	Adrian Dix	12,297	67.81	+7.18	$28,463.86
Liberal	Cole Anderson	3,919	21.61	−5.48	$1,200.00
Green	Scott Bernstein	1,662	9.16	−0.15	$1,539.01
Libertarian	Karin Litzcke	257	1.42	–	$0.00
Total valid votes		18,135	100.00	–	
Total rejected ballots		175	0.96	+0.09	
Turnout		18,310	44.50	−8.85	
Registered voters		41,144			
New Democratic hold		Swing		+6.33	
Source: Elections BC

2017 British Columbia general election: Vancouver-Kingsway
Party	Candidate	Votes	%	±%	Expenditures
New Democratic	Adrian Dix	12,031	60.63	+3.86	$63,235
Liberal	Trang Nguyen	5,377	27.09	−8.32	$49,362
Green	Ellisa Calder	1,848	9.31	+2.04	$1,244
Conservative	Charles Bae	504	2.54	–	$855
Your Political Party	Brette Mullins	85	0.43	–	$1,053
Total valid votes		19,845	100.00	–	
Total rejected ballots		174	0.87	−0.44	
Turnout		20,019	53.35	+4.39	
Registered voters		37,521			
Source: Elections BC

2013 British Columbia general election: Vancouver-Kingsway
Party	Candidate	Votes	%	±%	Expenditures
New Democratic	Adrian Dix	10,409	56.77	+1.60	$139,024
Liberal	Gurjit Dhillon	6,600	35.99	−5.97	$40,883
Green	Gregory Dale Esau	1,327	7.24	+3.06	$250
Total valid votes		18,336	100.00		
Total rejected ballots		244	1.31		
Turnout		18,580	48.96		
Source: Elections BC

2009 British Columbia general election: Vancouver-Kingsway
Party	Candidate	Votes	%	Expenditures
New Democratic	Adrian Dix	9,229	55.17	$87,767
Liberal	Bill Yuen	6,518	38.96	$69,706
Green	Rev Warkentin	699	4.18	$353
Libertarian	Matt Kadioglu	171	1.02	$250
People's Front	Charles Boylan	122	0.67	$250
Total valid votes		16,739	100.00	
Total rejected ballots		215	1.27	
Turnout		16,944	46.99	

2005 British Columbia general election: Vancouver-Kingsway
Party	Candidate	Votes	%	Expenditures
New Democratic	Adrian Dix	10,038	51.44	$84,411
Liberal	Rob Nijjar	7,894	40.46	$115,864
Green	Stuart Mackinnon	1,212	6.21	$4,556
Marijuana	Steven Mackenzie Lay	219	1.12	$100
People's Front	Donna Petersen	77	0.39	$103
Sex	Yvonne Maylynne Tink	73	0.37	$100
Total valid votes		19,513	100	
Total rejected ballots		239	1.22	
Turnout		19,752	54.19	

=== Leadership elections ===
2011 British Columbia New Democratic Party leadership election
Candidate	First ballot		Second ballot		Third ballot	
Candidate	Votes	Percent	Votes	Percent	Votes	Percent
Adrian Dix	7,638	38.2%	7,748	39.3%	9,772	51.8%
Mike Farnworth	6,979	34.9%	6,951	35.2%	9,095	48.2%
John Horgan	4,844	24.2%	5,034	25.5%	Eliminated	
Dana Larsen	531	2.7%	Eliminated			

British Columbia provincial government of John Horgan
Cabinet post (1)
Predecessor	Office	Successor
Mary Polak	Minister of Health; July 18, 2017–	Incumbent
