= George Heyman =

Canadian politician

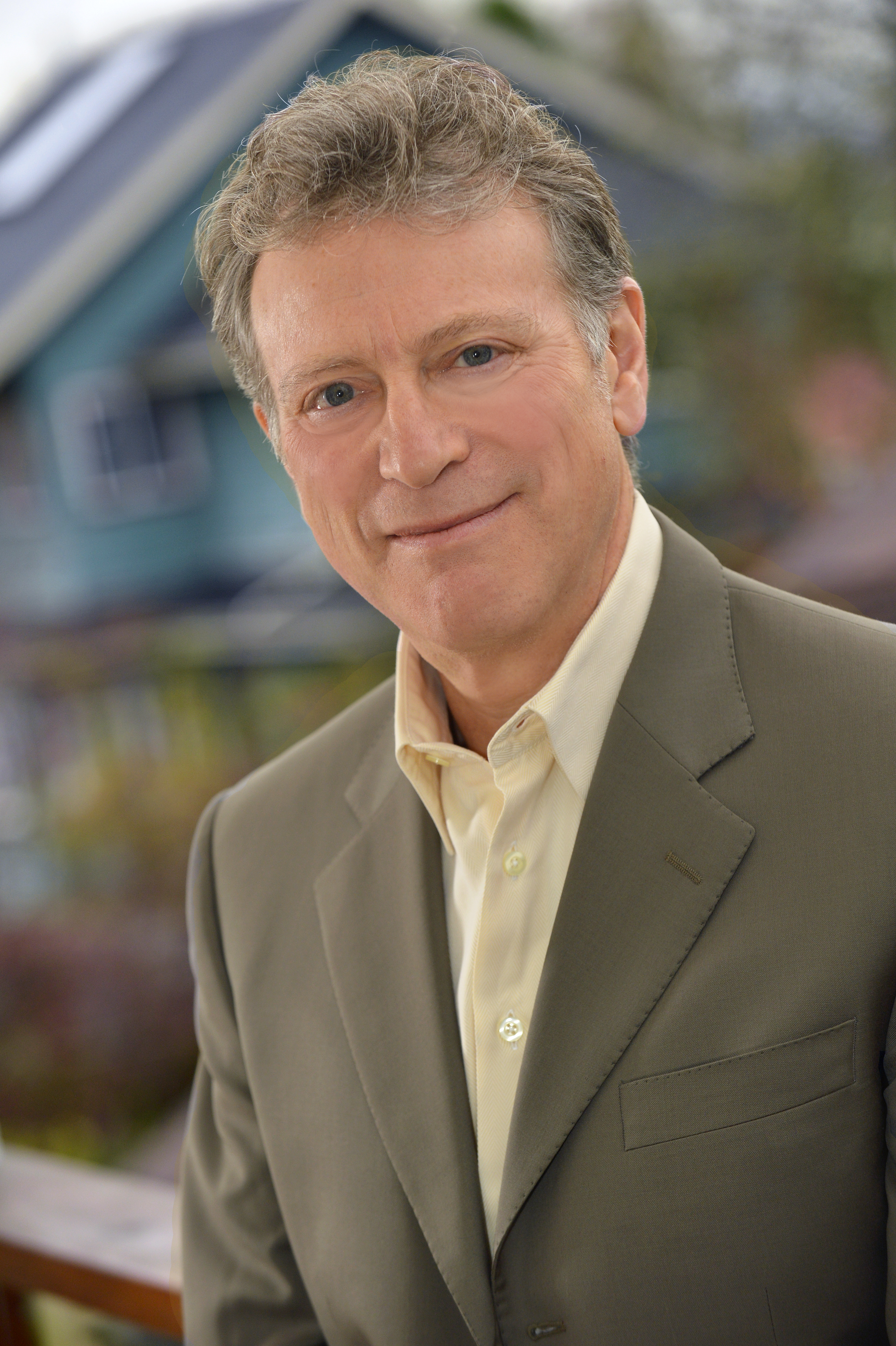

Minister of Environment and Climate Change Strategy of British Columbia
- In office July 18, 2017 – November 18, 2024
- Premier: John Horgan; David Eby
- Preceded by: Jordan Sturdy (Minister of Environment)
- Succeeded by: Tamara Davidson

Minister responsible for TransLink
- In office November 24, 2020 – December 7, 2022
- Premier: John Horgan; David Eby
- Preceded by: position established
- Succeeded by: position abolished

Member of the British Columbia Legislative Assembly for Vancouver-Fairview
- In office May 14, 2013 – September 21, 2024
- Preceded by: Margaret MacDiarmid

Personal details
- Born: Vancouver
- Party: New Democratic Party
- Occupation: Environmentalist, politician, trade unionist

George Heyman is a Canadian politician and former social, environmental and labour activist. He represented the district of Vancouver-Fairview in the Legislative Assembly of British Columbia from 2013 until 2024 as a member of the British Columbia New Democratic Party (BC NDP). He served as Minister of Environment and Climate Change Strategy of British Columbia.

== Background ==
He was born in Vancouver to Stefan and Marta Heyman, a Polish-Jewish couple who escaped occupied Poland during the Second World War by way of Japan with the help of Chiune Sugihara, the Japanese Empire vice-consul at Kaunas, Lithuania. The Heymans were sponsored by relatives in Canada, settling in Vancouver where Stefan worked as a machinist while getting his engineering credentials recognized.

Heyman briefly worked as a logger before becoming a log scaler with the British Columbia Ministry of Forests in 1978. He became involved in the labour movement, eventually serving as president of the British Columbia Government and Service Employees' Union (BCGEU) from 1999 to 2008. As a representative of BCGEU, he was a federal government appointee as a governor of the Canadian Centre for Occupational Health and Safety from 1998 to 2000. He also served on the governing panel of administrators of the B.C. Workers’ Compensation Board (now WorkSafeBC) from 1997 to 2001, and chaired the WCB’s audit committee.

From April 2009 to December 2012 Heyman served as executive director of the Sierra Club BC. He oversaw the financial and administrative health of the organization as well as being Sierra Club’s primary public spokesperson on issues regarding energy, mining, conservation of species and habitat, climate change, environmental assessment, forest management and sustainable economic alternatives. Effective January 1, 2013, he took a leave of absence to run in the provincial election.

== Politics ==
Heyman faced high-profile Vancouver city councillor Geoff Meggs in the nomination contest to become the BC NDP candidate for Vancouver-Fairview in the 2013 provincial election. The contest was described by Norman Ruff, professor emeritus at the University of Victoria, as a "clash of titans." While both candidates were considered potential cabinet material, The Globe and Mail reported that Heyman had "the right stuff to be a power player" in an NDP government. On October 21, 2012, Heyman defeated Meggs by winning 58% of the votes, becoming the party's candidate Vancouver-Fairview.

Heyman won the seat on election day, defeating incumbent BC Liberal cabinet minister Margaret MacDiarmid. With the NDP once again forming the official opposition, Heyman at one point considered running in the 2014 leadership election to replace Adrian Dix before deciding against it. In the 40th Parliament of British Columbia he served as critic for the environment, green economy and technology. Until February 2016 he also held responsibility for film, television and TransLink.

After winning re-election in the 2017 provincial election, Heyman was appointed the Minister of Environment and Climate Change Strategy in the newly formed NDP minority government on July 18, 2017.

Heyman defeated Liberal candidate and former Vancouver city councillor George Affleck at the 2020 provincial election, as the NDP achieved a majority government. Following the election, on November 24, 2020 he was given the additional role of Minister responsible for TransLink in the second cabinet of Premier John Horgan. In the new cabinet announced by Premier David Eby on December 7, 2022, he retained the post of Minister of Environment and Climate Change Strategy, while the separate TransLink portfolio was abolished.

On March 4, 2024, Heyman announced he would not be seeking re-election in that year's general election.

== Electoral record ==
2020 British Columbia general election: Vancouver-Fairview
Party	Candidate	Votes	%	±%	Expenditures
New Democratic	George Heyman	15,538	56.07	+1.95	$42,472.54
Liberal	George Affleck	7,570	27.32	−4.53	$52,688.01
Green	Ian Goldman	4,368	15.76	+2.23	$1,481.40
Libertarian	Sandra Filosof-Schipper	234	0.84	–	$0.00
Total valid votes		27,710	100.00	–	
Total rejected ballots		318	1.13	+0.45	
Turnout		28,028	61.08	−4.71	
Registered voters		45,991			
New Democratic hold		Swing		+3.24	
Source: Elections BC

2017 British Columbia general election: Vancouver-Fairview
Party	Candidate	Votes	%	±%	Expenditures
New Democratic	George Heyman	16,035	54.12	+6.80	$67,813
Liberal	Gabe Garfinkel	9,436	31.85	-10.41	$66,722
Green	Louise Boutin	4,007	13.53	+3.11	$437
Your Political Party	Joey Doyle	149	0.50	–	$344
Total valid votes		29,627	100.00	–	
Total rejected ballots		204	0.68	-0.14	
Turnout		29,831	65.79	+6.81	
Registered voters		45,343			
Source: Elections BC

2013 British Columbia general election: Vancouver-Fairview
Party	Candidate	Votes	%
New Democratic	George Heyman	12,649	47.32
Liberal	Margaret MacDiarmid	11,298	42.26
Green	Matthew Pedley	2,785	10.42
Total valid votes		26,732	100.00
Total rejected ballots		220	0.82
Turnout		26,952	58.98
Source: Elections BC

British Columbia provincial government of David Eby
Cabinet posts (2)
Predecessor	Office	Successor
cont'd from Horgan Ministry	Minister responsible for TransLink; November 18, 2022 – December 7, 2022	position abolished
cont'd from Horgan Ministry	Minister of the Environment and Climate Change Strategy; November 18, 2022 –	Incumbent
British Columbia provincial government of John Horgan
Cabinet posts (2)
Predecessor	Office	Successor
position established	Minister responsible for TransLink; November 24, 2020 – November 18, 2022	cont'd into Eby Ministry
Jordan Sturdy	Minister of the Environment and Climate Change Strategy; July 18, 2017 – November 18, 2022	cont'd into Eby Ministry
