= Freedom Party of Ontario =

Provincial political party in Canada

Freedom Party of Ontario Parti de la Liberté – Ontario
- Active provincial party
- Leader: Paul McKeever
- President: Robert Metz
- Founded: 1984
- Preceded by: Unparty
- Headquarters: 240 Commissioners Road West; London, Ontario; N6J 1Y1
- Ideology: Objectivism; Libertarianism
- Colours: Black and White

Website
- www.freedomparty.on.ca

The Freedom Party of Ontario (FPO; French: Parti de la Liberté – Ontario) is a provincial political party in Ontario, Canada. It was founded on January 1, 1984, in London, Ontario by Robert Metz and Marc Emery. The Freedom Party has fielded candidates in every provincial election since 1985, and in several by-elections. It has also participated in numerous public policy debates, often on contentious social issues.

In 1980, a schism occurred in the libertarian movement in Ontario, with several members of the Libertarian Party, unhappy with its direction and democratic structure, left to follow the Objectivist Unparty. In 1984, the Unparty changed its name to the Freedom Party of Ontario.

== Ideology ==
The Freedom Party's founding principle is that "every individual, in the peaceful pursuit of personal fulfillment, has an absolute right to his or her own life, liberty, and property." The Freedom Party membership's stated objectives are four-fold: encouraging voters to vote for FPO candidates in provincial elections and by-elections, influencing government through the election of FPO candidates to the Ontario legislature, protecting every Ontarian's right to life, liberty and property, and lastly building and supporting the FPO by becoming a network of individuals dedicated to carrying out the aforementioned principles, described in detail above.

The party has, from its inception in 1984, explained that "the Freedom Party believes that the purpose of government is to protect our freedom of choice, not to restrict it." The party advocates government that takes into account only claims backed by evidence. It submits that all government laws and decisions must be logical, and must at all times serve the purpose of ensuring that no person's life, liberty, or property is taken without his consent.

== History ==
=== Founding ===
The Freedom Party of Ontario was founded by a number of people based in the London, Ontario area, including Robert Metz and Marc Emery of London, who had founded The London Tribune (a broadsheet daily newspaper) in London in 1980; they later published the London Metrobulletin (beginning in March 1983). Toward the end of 1983, Metz assumed the registration of the Toronto-based Unparty which folded and closed its Toronto office. Elections Ontario approved the party's name change on October 19, 1983. Because Metz and Emery were turning their attention to electoral politics, the final issue of the London Metrobulletin was published in December 1983. Freedom Party of Ontario was officially launched on January 1, 1984, with its head office in London. Freedom Party of Ontario's founding platform was summarized in the statement: "Freedom Party believes that the purpose of government is to protect our freedom of choice, not to restrict it."

=== 1984–2002 ===
The FPO was best known during the 1980s for its campaigns against censorship and provincial laws that restricted Sunday shopping. Robert Metz, the party's first president, spoke for the FPO in 1987 when he argued that the Sunday shopping debate was fundamentally about freedom of choice for the retailer and consumer. Leading FPO members also opposed legal restrictions on pornography that depicts consensual sex between consenting adults, and opposed the prohibition of marijuana, arguing that the state did not have the right to legislate in such matters.

On economic issues, the FPO supported tax reductions and opposed provincial welfare programs. It was also critical of the Ontario Human Rights Commission and of affirmative action programs. Some prominent former members of Voice of Canadians (VOC), a now-defunct group that opposed official multiculturalism and official bilingualism, have affiliated with the FPO since the 1990s.

Metz became the first leader of the party in 1987. Metz served as leader until 1994, when he was replaced by Jack Plant. Plant stepped down in 1997, and was replaced by Lloyd Walker. All of the party's leaders between 1987 and 2002 were from London, and the party's activities were organized primarily from that city. The party newsletter, Freedom Flyer, was published on an occasional basis, and back copies are available online.

The Freedom Party has opposed government restrictions on free speech and freedom of expression throughout its existence, arguing that the state has no right to intervene except in cases of fraud, defamation, or the commission of crimes such as sex with children. Marc Emery frequently challenged Canada's censorship laws during his years as an FPO organizer, via the private bookstore he operated in London. He continued to do so after resigning from FPO in 1990.

The FPO took a civil libertarian stance on hate speech and the rights of individuals to express political opinions, whether those opinions are rational or irrational, unoffensive or offensive, popular or unpopular. In 1999, the London police wrote to Raphael Bergmann and Tyler Chilcott alleging that they were members of the Northern Alliance. The letter stated that, as they belonged to an "extreme right-wing" group they were "required" to report to the police to explain their opinions. The FPO's then leader, Lloyd Walker requested that Solicitor-General David Tsubouchi provide a list of "extreme" political beliefs that could result in such police action. No response was provided by the government, and nothing more came of the matter. Bergmann and Chilcott were never FPO members and the party did not support their views, simply their right to express them.

=== Since 2002 under leadership of Paul McKeever ===
As of 2025, McKeever (born 1966) is the Freedom Party's leader; he has been in this position since 2002.

Under McKeever's leadership, the Freedom Party of Ontario nominated 24 candidates in the 2003 provincial election and 15 candidates in the 2007 provincial election. 56 Freedom Party candidates contested the 2011 provincial election and 42 Freedom Party candidates contested the 2014 provincial election.

The FPO promoted an electoral platform entitled "The Right Direction" for the 2003 election, arguing that with the PCs turning away from Mike Harris's Common Sense Revolution, the FPO was the only remaining party with "common sense".

On October 4, 2005, the FPO released its 2007 election platform. It focused on competition in health care and education, repealing price controls on electricity, the replacement of property taxes with consumption taxes, and the elimination of the provincial income tax.

The party failed to win any seats in the 2022 Ontario general election.

== Election results ==
Election results
Election year	Leader	No. of overall votes	% of overall total	No. of candidates run	No. of seats won	+/−	Government
1985	Robert Metz	1,583	0.1	3	0	New Party	Extra-parliamentary
1987	Robert Metz	4,735	0.1	9	0	0	Extra-parliamentary
1990	Robert Metz	6,015	0.2	10	0	0	Extra-parliamentary
1995	Jack Plant	4,532	0.1	11	0	0	Extra-parliamentary
1999	Lloyd Walker	4,806	0.1	14	0	0	Extra-parliamentary
2003	Paul McKeever	8,376	0.2	24	0	0	Extra-parliamentary
2007	Paul McKeever	3,003	0.1	15	0	0	Extra-parliamentary
2011	Paul McKeever	9,285	0.2	56	0	0	Extra-parliamentary
2014	Paul McKeever	12,381	0.3	42	0	0	Extra-parliamentary
2018	Paul McKeever	2,565	0.04	14	0	0	Extra-parliamentary
2022	Paul McKeever	2,103	0.04	11	0	0	Extra-parliamentary
2025	Paul McKeever	1,379	0.03	5	0	0	Extra-parliamentary

== See also ==
- List of Ontario general elections
- List of Ontario political parties
- List of libertarian political parties
- Freedom Party of Ontario candidates, 2003 Ontario provincial election
