= Pat Bell =

Canadian politician

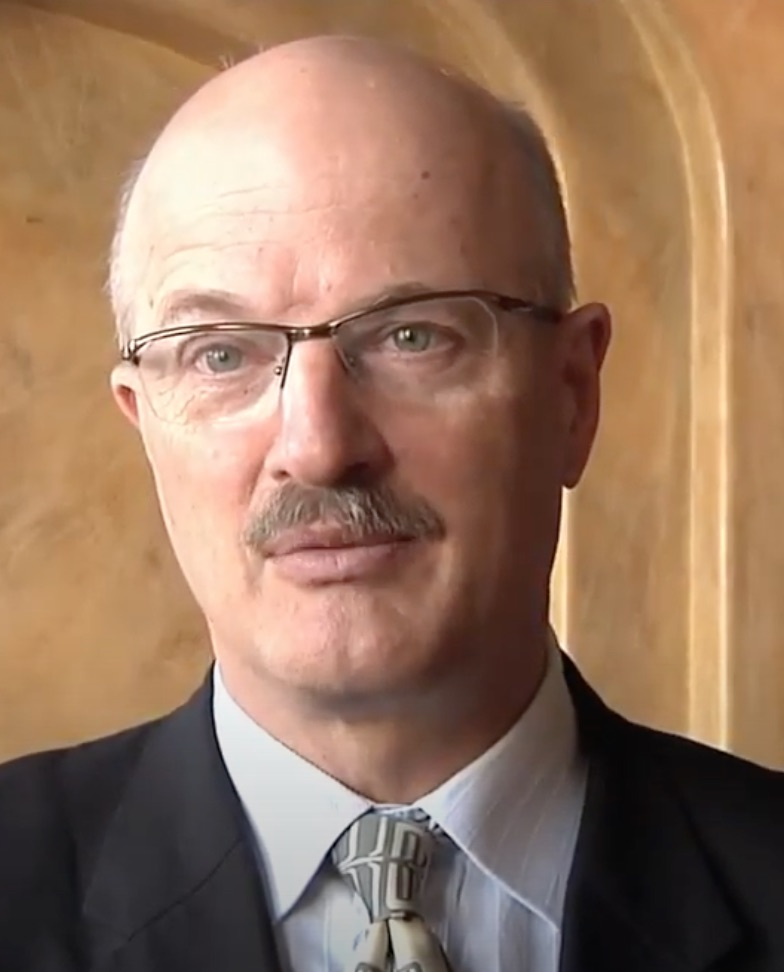

Member of the British Columbia Legislative Assembly for Prince George-Mackenzie Prince George North (2001-2009)
- In office May 16, 2001 – May 14, 2013
- Preceded by: Paul Ramsey
- Succeeded by: Mike Morris

Minister of State for Mining of British Columbia
- In office January 26, 2004 – June 16, 2005
- Premier: Gordon Campbell
- Preceded by: position established
- Succeeded by: Bill Bennett

Minister of Agriculture and Lands of British Columbia
- In office June 16, 2005 – June 23, 2008
- Premier: Gordon Campbell
- Preceded by: John van Dongen
- Succeeded by: Stan Hagen

Minister of Forests, Mines and Lands of British Columbia Minister of Forests and Range (2008-2010)
- In office June 23, 2008 – March 14, 2011
- Premier: Gordon Campbell
- Preceded by: Rich Coleman
- Succeeded by: Steve Thomson (Forests, Lands and Natural Resource Operations); Rich Coleman (Energy and Mines)

Minister of Jobs, Tourism and Skills Training of British Columbia Minister of Jobs, Tourism and Innovation (2011-2012)
- In office March 14, 2011 – June 10, 2013
- Premier: Christy Clark
- Preceded by: Margaret MacDiarmid (Tourism, Trade and Investment)
- Succeeded by: Shirley Bond

Minister Responsible for Labour of British Columbia
- In office September 5, 2012 – June 10, 2013
- Premier: Christy Clark
- Preceded by: Margaret MacDiarmid (Labour, Citizens' Services and Open Government)
- Succeeded by: Shirley Bond

Personal details
- Born: March 17, 1957 (age 69) Vancouver, British Columbia
- Party: Liberal
- Spouse: Brenda Lapp (m. 1978)

Patrick Bell (born March 17, 1957) is a former Canadian politician. He was a member of the Legislative Assembly (MLA) of British Columbia, representing Prince George North from 2001 to 2009, and Prince George-Mackenzie from 2009 to 2013. A caucus member of the British Columbia Liberal Party, he served in several cabinet posts under premiers Gordon Campbell and Christy Clark.

== Biography ==
Born in Vancouver, Bell graduated from Lord Byng Secondary School in 1975 before attending the University of British Columbia. He married Brenda Lapp in 1978, with whom he has three children. A resident of Prince George since 1988, he owned two Wendy's restaurants in the city and a trucking company, and was the co-owner of a logging company.

He ran as a candidate for the British Columbia Liberal Party in the 2001 provincial election, and was elected Member of the Legislative Assembly for Prince George North. He was appointed to the cabinet by Premier Gordon Campbell in January 2004 to serve as Minister of State for Mining. Following his re-election in 2005, he was named Minister of Agriculture and Lands, before being reassigned as Minister of Forests and Range in June 2008.

He was re-elected MLA in 2009 in the newly established riding of Prince George-Mackenzie and retained his cabinet post, which expanded in scope in October 2010 as he became Minister of Forests, Mines and Lands. After Christy Clark took over as premier in March 2011, Bell was named Minister of Jobs, Tourism and Innovation. His post was re-titled Minister of Jobs, Tourism and Skills Training in September 2012, and he simultaneously took on the role of Minister Responsible for Labour.

On February 17, 2013, Bell announced that due to health problems (an aneurysm), he would not stand for re-election that May. In 2015 he and his son Doug opened a fruit winery called Northern Lights Estate Winery in Prince George.
