= East London (disambiguation) =

East London is an informal major subdivision of London, England.

East London may also refer to:

In areas of London, UK:

- The East End of London, a traditional designation of the area east of the medieval walled City of London
- East (London sub region), a sub region of London defined in the London Plan
- E postcode area, the part of the London post town covering parts of east London and Essex

In transport in London, UK:

- East London (bus company)
- East London line, a former London Underground line now incorporated into the London Overground

In other places:

- East London, South Africa, a city in Eastern Cape, on the southeast coast of South Africa with a population of 267,000

In former electoral districts or constituencies:

- London East (federal electoral district), federal electorate in Canada from 1968 to 1997
- London East (European Parliament constituency), British regional constituency from 1979 to 1999

In organisations:

- East London Credit Union, a savings and loans co-operative, based in Walthamstow

== See also ==
- London South (provincial electoral district)
- London South (European Parliament constituency)
- South London
