= Paul Ramsey (politician) =

Canadian politician

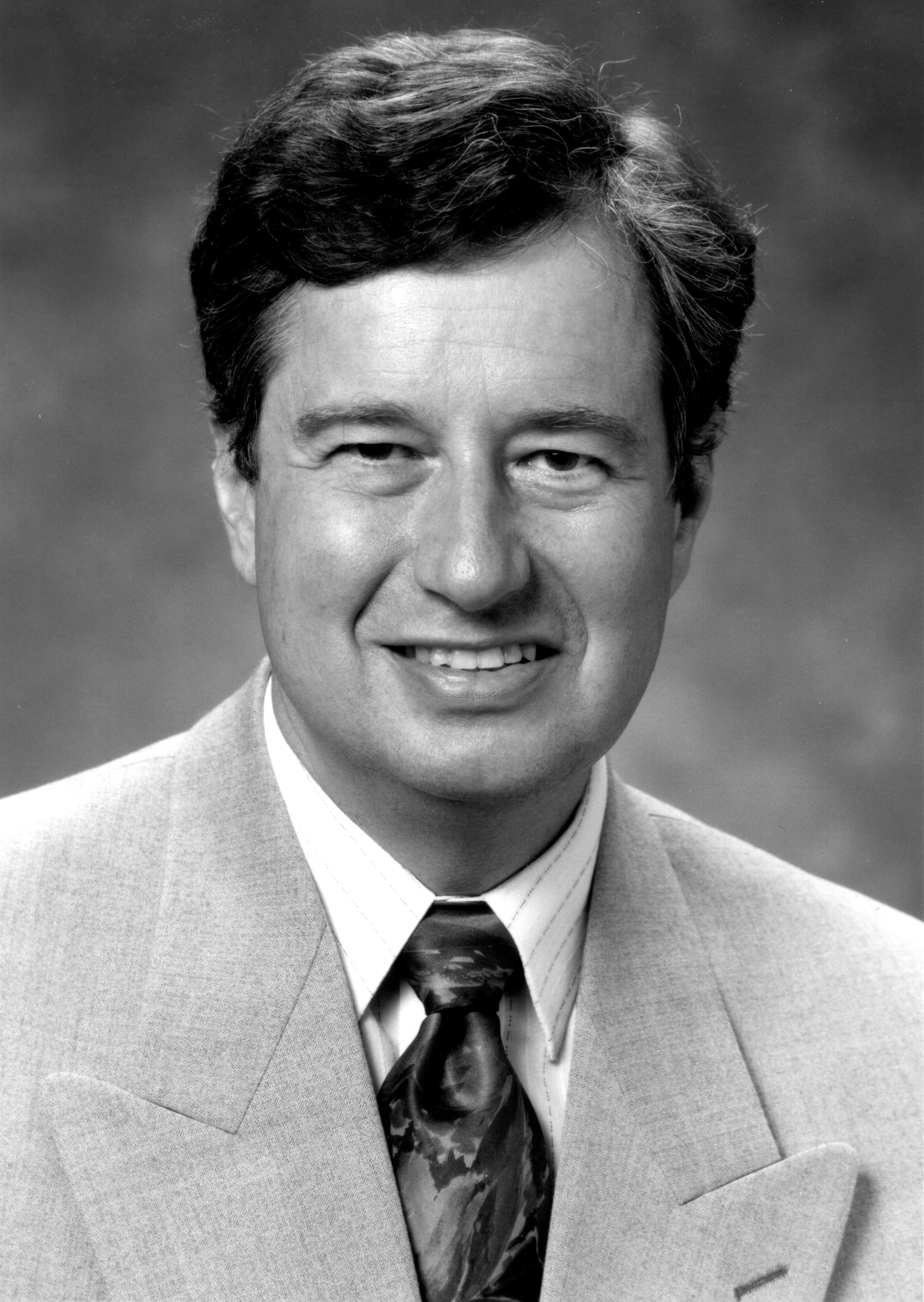

Member of the British Columbia Legislative Assembly for Prince George North
- In office October 17, 1991 – May 16, 2001
- Preceded by: Lois Boone
- Succeeded by: Pat Bell

Personal details
- Born: Pittsburgh, Pennsylvania
- Party: British Columbia New Democratic Party

Paul Ramsey is a Canadian academic and politician. A member of the New Democratic Party, he was elected to the Legislative Assembly of British Columbia for Prince George North in 1991 and re-elected in 1996, serving until 2001.

== Biography ==
Ramsey was born in a suburb of Milwaukee, the son of a manager of a steel fabricating plant and councilman. He started his post-secondary education in chemical engineering at Northwestern University, but after two years switched to literature, receiving a bachelor's (Carroll College) and master's (University of Illinois) degree in English. he taught at the University of Wisconsin, Superior for three years. He met Hazel at Carroll College and they moved to the University of British Columbia so he could start a Ph.D. In 1975, he got a job as an English instructor at the College of New Caledonia in Prince George. He was almost immediately involved in the new union, and treasurer of the provincial College Faculties Federation. He did a short stint as Director of Adult Education at CNC from 1979 to 1982, and got back into union politics as president of the Faculty Association of CNC. From 1987 to 1989, he served as president of the college-Institute Educators Association of British Columbia.

== Political career ==
Ramsey was elected in Prince George North in October 1991. His first cabinet appointment was as Parliamentary Secretary to the Minister of Forests. In September 1993 he was appointed Minister of Health and Minister Responsible for Seniors where he served until February 1996 when he became Minister of Education, Skills and Training. In February 1996 he became Minister of Environment, Lands and Parks. In January 1997 he returned to the Ministry of Education, Skills, and Training. In February 1998 he became Minister of Education, which he remained until September 1999. On September 21, 1999, he was appointed Minister of Finance and Corporate Relations. On November 1, 2000, he added the role of Minister Responsible for Northern Development.

Following the 1996 election, an unsuccessful recall campaign was launched against Ramsey.

He did not run for re-election in 2001, and returned to the College of New Caledonia as an English instructor. He was also a visiting professor in Political Science at the University of Northern British Columbia, and political columnist for the Prince George Citizen.

He retired to the Saanich Peninsula in 2005.

Ramsey and his wife Hazel have two grown children, Paul and Ann.

== Publications ==
- Some thoughts on a Northern Ministry for British Columbia, Northern Review (Summer 2005). link
