= Lois Boone =

Canadian politician (born 1947)

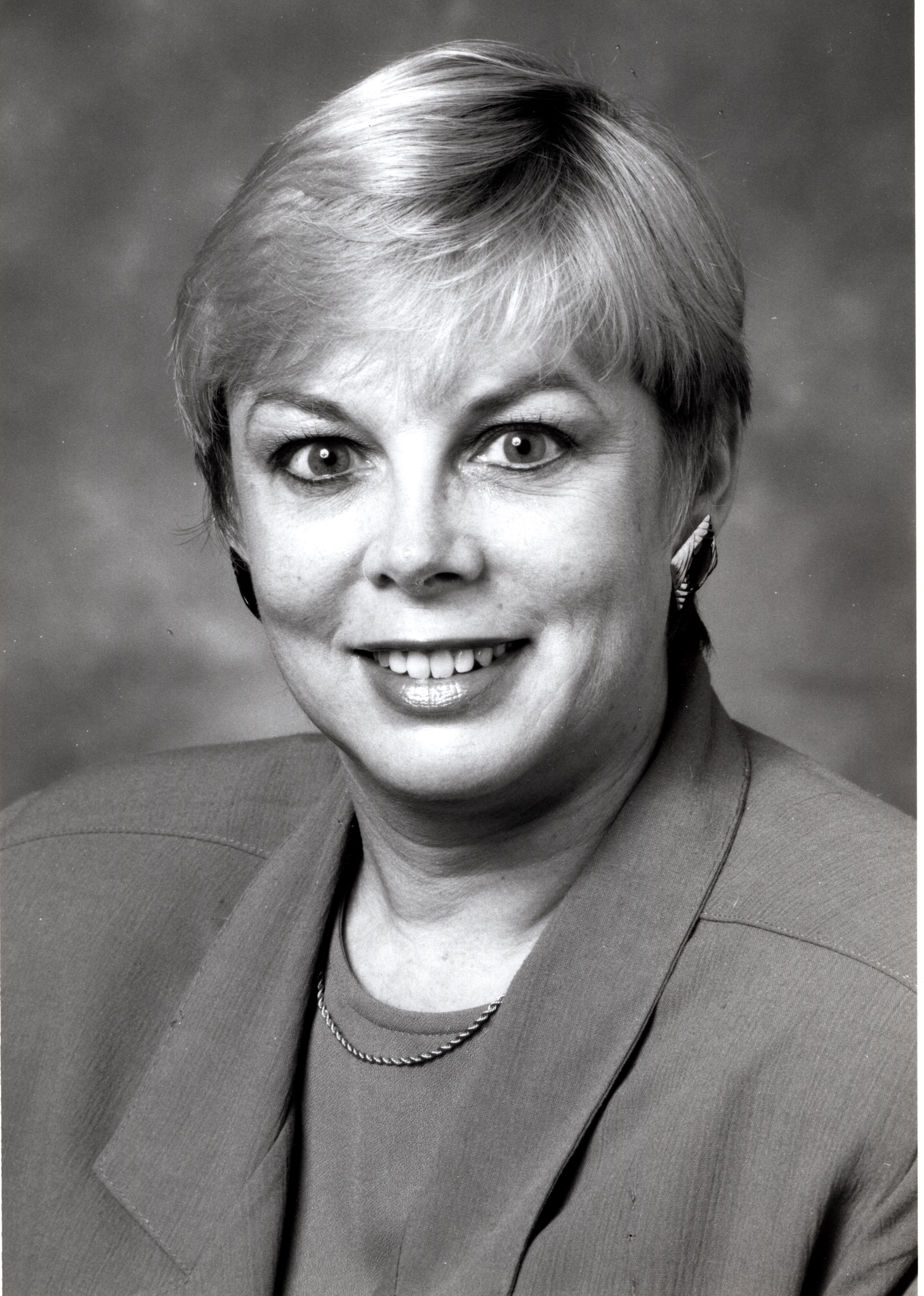

Member of the British Columbia Legislative Assembly for Prince George-Mount Robson
- In office October 17, 1991 – May 16, 2001
- Preceded by: Bruce Strachan
- Succeeded by: Shirley Bond

Member of the British Columbia Legislative Assembly for Prince George North
- In office October 22, 1986 – October 17, 1991
- Preceded by: John Heinrich
- Succeeded by: Paul Ramsey

Minister of Government Services of British Columbia
- In office November 5, 1991 – September 15, 1993
- Premier: Michael Harcourt
- Preceded by: Caroline Mary Gran
- Succeeded by: Robin Blencoe

Minister of Municipal Affairs and Housing of British Columbia
- In office February 28, 1996 – June 17, 1996
- Premier: Glen Clark
- Preceded by: Sue Hammell
- Succeeded by: Dan Miller

Minister of Transportation and Highways of British Columbia
- In office June 17, 1996 – February 18, 1998
- Premier: Glen Clark
- Preceded by: Corky Evans
- Succeeded by: Harry Lali

Minister of Children and Families of British Columbia
- In office February 18, 1998 – February 24, 2000
- Premier: Glen Clark
- Preceded by: Penny Priddy
- Succeeded by: Gretchen Brewin

7th Deputy Premier of British Columbia
- In office August 25, 1999 – February 24, 2000
- Premier: Dan Miller
- Preceded by: Dan Miller
- Succeeded by: Joy MacPhail

Personal details
- Born: April 26, 1947 (age 78) Vancouver, British Columbia
- Party: New Democrat

Lois Ruth Boone (born April 26, 1947) is a Canadian politician. She served as MLA for Prince George North from 1986 to 1991, and Prince George-Mount Robson from 1991 to 2001, in the Legislative Assembly of British Columbia. She is a member of the British Columbia New Democratic Party.

== Career ==
Boone held a number of brief positions in the Executive Council of British Columbia, including Minister of Government Services, Minister of Municipal Affairs and Housing and Minister of Transportation and Highways. Later government roles included the Minister for Children and Families and Deputy Premier.

After stepping down from provincial politics, Boone was re-elected as a school trustee for School District #57. In October 2010, she announced she would seek the NDP nomination in the by-election in the federal riding of Prince George-Peace River.

At the November 23, 2010 School District #57 public board meeting, she announced she would not be seeking renewal of her position as vice-chair of the board nor would she be seeking re-election as a trustee. She stated that her decision predated her decision to enter federal politics and was due to the unease she felt over being a part of so many school closure decisions and an unwillingness to continue to "do the government's dirty work".

== Federal politics ==
On May 2, 2011, she was defeated by Conservative Party member, Bob Zimmer, in the federal Canadian election by 62% to 25%.

=== Partial electoral results ===
2011 Canadian federal election: Prince George—Peace River
Party	Candidate	Votes	%	±%	Expenditures
Conservative	Bob Zimmer	23,946	62.12	−1.47	$81,669
New Democratic	Lois Boone	9,876	25.62	+8.04	$38,397
Green	Hilary Crowley	2,301	5.97	−4.44	$11,625
Liberal	Ben Levine	2,008	5.21	−3.20	$9,197
Pirate	Jeremy Cote	415	1.08	–	
Total valid votes		38,546	100.0		
Total rejected ballots		125	0.32	−0.03	
Turnout		38,671	54.08	+5	
Eligible voters		71,507			
Conservative hold		Swing		−4.76	
