= Voice of Canadians =

Former political advocacy group

Voice of Canadians Committees was a right-wing political advocacy group that existed in Canada during the 1990s. Based in Ontario, it opposed diversity, equity, and inclusion initiatives including employment equity, official multiculturalism and official bilingualism. It also called for the Canadian Charter of Rights and Freedoms to be repealed. Some of its leading members, including chairman Dick Field, later joined the Freedom Party of Ontario. Their slogan was "the silent majority will be silent no longer."

In 1996, objecting to collection of racial data in the census, which they believed would divide Canadians, the Voice of Canadians Committees launched the "Mark Me Canadian" campaign.
