= Brian Taylor (politician) =

Canadian politician (born 1946)

Mayor of Grand Forks
- In office ?–2022
- In office 1997–1999

Leader of the British Columbia Marijuana Party
- In office 2001–2002
- Preceded by: First Leader
- Succeeded by: Dana Larsen

Personal details
- Born: September 24, 1946 (age 80)
- Party: British Columbia Marijuana Party (2001–2002)

Brian Taylor is a medical cannabis activist and politician in British Columbia. He and Marc Emery created the British Columbia Marijuana Party. Brian was the first leader of the party during the 2001 provincial election. He was a former mayor of Grand Forks in British Columbia, He was once nicknamed the "marijuana mayor". Brian was featured on a CBC documentary called Cannabiz about the medicinal marijuana industry. "Cannabis Health" is a journal magazine that was created by Brian Taylor. A company created by Brian Taylor is Grand Forks Cannabis Research Institute Inc.
