= Unparty =

Defunct anarcho-capitalist political party in Canada

- Former provincial party
- Founded: 1980
- Dissolved: 1983
- Split from: Ontario Libertarian Party
- Succeeded by: Freedom Party of Ontario
- Headquarters: Toronto
- Ideology: Objectivism

The Unparty emerged as a political party in Ontario, Canada during the early 1980s. It was established by former members of the Ontario Libertarian Party, namely Lisa Butler, Mary Lou Gutscher (former OLP chair), Bill McDonald, and Paul Wakfer (former president of the Libertarian Party of Canada).

These individuals held fundamental disagreements with their previous party and decided to form the Unparty. One of the key motivations behind its formation was their evolution towards market anarchism in their libertarian beliefs, leading them to advocate for the abolition of state offices.

As a result, the Unparty's core focus was centered around candidates elected under its banner refusing their salaries and actively voting against any legislation aimed at expanding or sustaining the state.

Headquartered in Toronto, the Unparty successfully obtained the necessary voter signatures to register in Ontario and Alberta, as well as qualify as a provincial party in New Brunswick. The party gained significant attention through successful public campaigns that garnered national news coverage. Notable examples included protests against the census and high-profile resistance to the government's forced demolition of a privately owned home, which the Unparty believed was an unjust action despite its legality.

Unlike traditional political parties, the Unparty adopted an organizational structure resembling a partnership rather than a democracy. The founding principle rested on the notion that members were considered customers, whose continued support depended on the progress made by the party's leadership. The executive team, with input from the members, was responsible for delivering value to ensure ongoing support. This organizational approach, combined with the Unparty's official registration status in Ontario, appealed to the leaders of the Unparty's London Constituency Associations, which had been the most active and visible groups within the Unparty outside of its headquarters.

The Unparty founders retired in 1983; leaders of the London Constituency Association took over the running of the party under a new name and a revised Statement of Purpose as the Freedom Party of Ontario.
