= East London Credit Union =

British not-for-profit member-owned financial co-operative organisation

- Founded: 2003; 23 years ago
- Type: Industrial and Provident Society
- Location: London E17, United Kingdom
- Website: elcu.co.uk

East London Credit Union Limited was a not-for-profit member-owned financial co-operative, based in Walthamstow and operating in the east London boroughs of Waltham Forest, Enfield, Haringey, Hackney, Newham, Redbridge and the Epping Forest district of Essex. All members of the credit union were instant savers; different loans were provided depending on individual circumstances.

Waltham Forest Community Credit Union (not to be confused with the separate Waltham Forest Council Employees Credit Union) was formed in 2003. It became East London Community Credit Union and finally, East London Credit Union in 2015.

A member of the Association of British Credit Unions Limited, registered under the Industrial and Provident Societies Acts, East London Credit Union was authorised by the Prudential Regulation Authority and regulated by the Financial Conduct Authority and PRA. Ultimately, like the banks and building societies, members' savings were protected against business failure by the Financial Services Compensation Scheme.

The credit union went into administration and the FSCS declared it in default on 11 September 2019.

== See also ==
- Credit unions in the United Kingdom
- British co-operative movement
