= People's Front (British Columbia) =

- Former provincial party
- Leader: Charles Boylan
- Founded: November 22, 1980
- Dissolved: May 31, 2017
- Headquarters: 26-3313 Dewdney Trunk Rd. Port Moody, British Columbia; V3H 2E4
- Ideology: Communism; Marxism–Leninism; Anti-revisionism
- National affiliation: Communist Party of Canada (Marxist–Leninist)
- Colours: Red

The People's Front was the British Columbian section of the Communist Party of Canada (Marxist–Leninist). The leader of the People's Front was Charles Boylan.

In the 2001 British Columbia election, it nominated 11 candidates, received a total of 720 votes (0.34% of the vote in the ridings in which they ran, and 0.05% of the province-wide vote). The PF candidates ran last in all but one of 11 ridings, and no candidate won more than 1% of the popular vote.

The party nominated five candidates for the 2005 election. They won a total of 383 votes (0.02% of the province-wide vote).

After failing to run any candidates in the 2013 and 2017 general elections, the party was deregistered on May 31, 2017.

== Election results ==
Election	Candidates	Votes	%	Riding	Candidate	Votes	% in riding	Ref.
1986	8	1,502	0.08%					
1986	8	1,502	0.08%	Surrey-Newton	Santokh Dhesi	37	0.13%	
1986	8	1,502	0.08%	Vancouver Centre	Brian Sproule	144	0.21%	
1986	8	1,502	0.08%	Vancouver East	Joseph Theriault	94	0.13%	
1986	8	1,502	0.08%	Vancouver-Little Mountain	Dorothy Jean O'Donnell	128	0.16%	
1986	8	1,502	0.08%	Vancouver-Little Mountain	Allan H. Bezanson	111	0.14%	
1986	8	1,502	0.08%	Vancouver-Point Grey	Allen Soroka	120	0.14%	
1986	8	1,502	0.08%	Vancouver South	Charles Boylan	513	0.66%	
1986	8	1,502	0.08%	Vancouver South	Harbhajan Cheema	355	0.46%	
2001	11	720	0.05%					
2001	11	720	0.05%	Abbotsford-Mount Lehman	David MacKay	46	0.25%	
2001	11	720	0.05%	Cariboo North	Al Charlebois	24	0.15%	
2001	11	720	0.05%	Cariboo South	Bruce Broomfield	83	0.50%	
2001	11	720	0.05%	Richmond-Steveston	Edith Petersen	21	0.10%	
2001	11	720	0.05%	Vancouver-Burrard	Joseph Theriault	40	0.17%	
2001	11	720	0.05%	Vancouver-Fairview	Brian Sproule	76	0.33%	
2001	11	720	0.05%	Vancouver-Hastings	Charles Boylan	119	0.63%	
2001	11	720	0.05%	Vancouver-Kingsway	Donna Petersen	81	0.49%	
2001	11	720	0.05%	Vancouver-Langara	Michael Hill	51	0.29%	
2001	11	720	0.05%	Vancouver-Point Grey	Anne Jamiesonx	43	0.18%	
2001	11	720	0.05%	Yale-Lillooet	Dorothy-Jean O'Donnell	136	0.84%	
2005	5	383	0.02%					
2005	5	383	0.02%	Bulkley Valley-Stikine	Frank Martin	41	0.32%	
2005	5	383	0.02%	Comox Valley	Barbara Biley	49	0.17%	
2005	5	383	0.02%	Vancouver-Kensington	Charles Boylan	99	0.47%	
2005	5	383	0.02%	Vancouver-Kingsway	Donna Petersen	77	0.39%	
2005	5	383	0.02%	Yale-Lillooet	Dorothy-Jean O'Donnell	115	0.66%	
2009	4	401	0.02%					
2009	4	401	0.02%	Chilliwack-Hope	Dorothy-Jean O'Donnell			
2009	4	401	0.02%	Comox Valley	Barbara Biley	120	0.41%	
2009	4	401	0.02%	Vancouver-Hastings	Donna Petersen	75	0.38%	
2009	4	401	0.02%	Vancouver-Kingsway	Charles Boylan	112	0.67%	

== Finances ==
Annual financial report
Year	Income	Expenses	Assets	Reference
2000	$0	$20	$0	
2001	$1,303	$1,286	$17	
2002	$90	$90	$17	
2003	$94	$111	$0	
2004	$0	$0	$0	
2005	$0	$0	$0	
2006	$0	$0	$0	
2007	$0	$0	$0	
2008	$0	$0	$0	
2009	$0	$0	$0	
2010	$0	$0	$0	

Election expenses
Election	Income	Expenses	Surplus/Deficit	Reference
2001	$375	$357	$18	
2005	$0	$0	$0	
2009	$0	$0	$0	
