= British Columbia Marijuana Party =

Canadian political party advocating cannabis legalization

- Former provincial party
- Abbreviation: BCMP
- President: Marc Emery
- Founded: 2000
- Dissolved: 2019
- Headquarters: 307 Hastings St W. Vancouver, British Columbia; V6B 1H6
- Ideology: Legalization of marijuana
- Colours: Tan, Green
- Seats in Legislature: 0 / 87

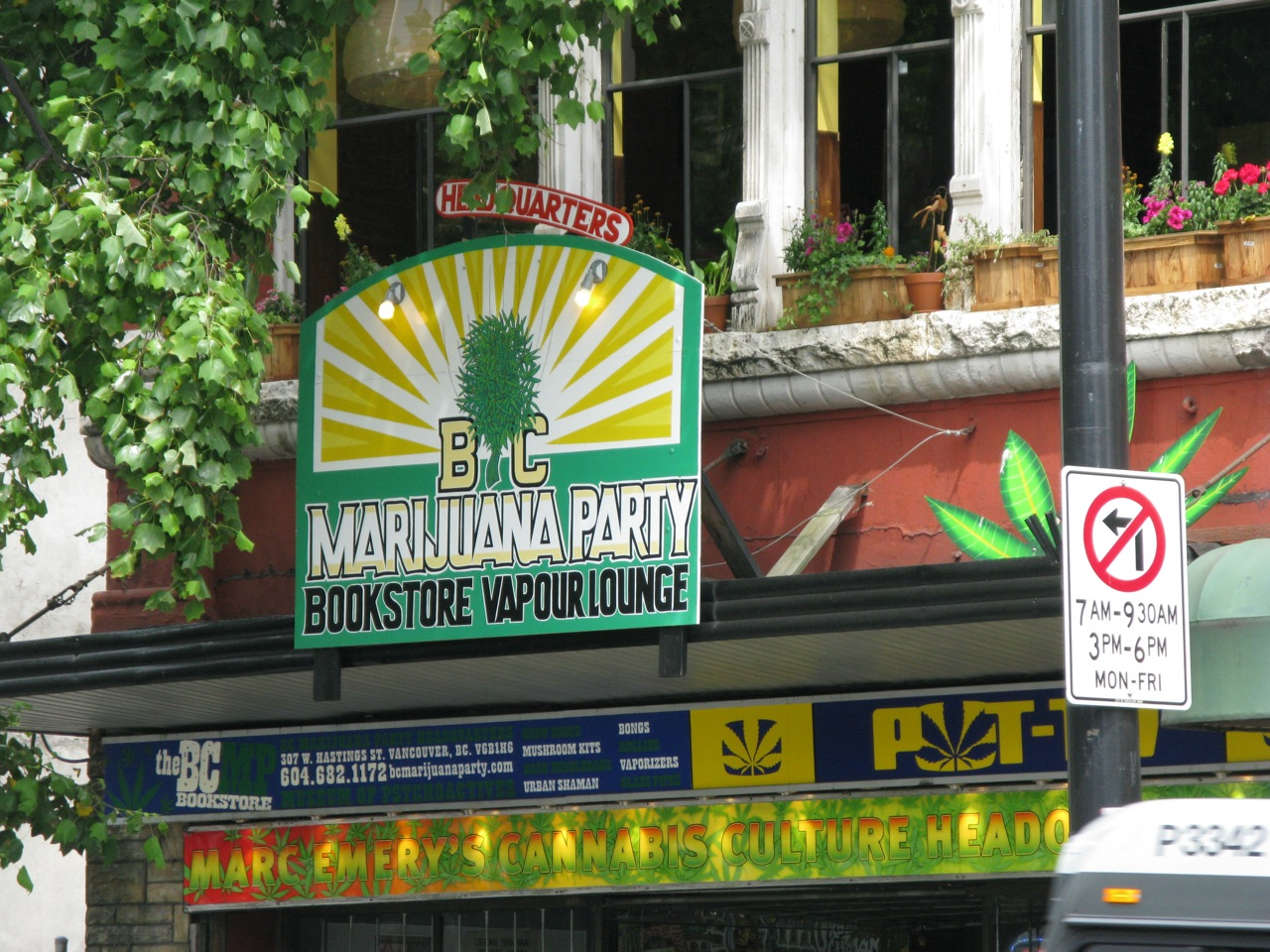
British Columbia Marijuana Party bookstore

The British Columbia Marijuana Party (abbreviated BCMP) was a minor political party in the Canadian province of British Columbia that advocated the legalisation of cannabis.

The BCMP was formed following the 2000 federal election. Marc Emery, the founder and current president of the party, formed the party the day after the 2000 vote. The BCMP made provincial history during the 2001 provincial election that came six months later, by being the only party to ever field candidates in all of the province's ridings during their first election campaign.

Brian Taylor served as the party's first leader during the 2001 provincial election. Taylor had been a prominent cannabis activist and was the former mayor of Grand Forks.

The Marijuana Party was excluded from the televised leaders' debate, even though they were running more candidates than either the Green Party or the Unity Party, both of which were included. BC Marijuana Party members protested during the televised debate.

In 2001, the party won 51,206 votes, 3.22% of the popular vote. Teresa Taylor, daughter of leader Brian Taylor, captured the party's highest popular vote total with 1,136 and polled 5.6% in the conservative Okanagan-Westside district.

After the election, Dana Larsen became leader, followed by Marc Emery when Larsen switched to the New Democratic Party in 2003.

Emery also remains as president and chief organizer, despite having faced extradition to the United States for selling marijuana seeds from Canada by mail order.

In the 2005 election, the party fielded 44 candidates, who won a total of 11,519 votes, or 0.64% of the province-wide total.

Before the 2009 election, the party announced it would endorse Green Party candidates in every riding across the province. However, it would run two candidates to continue its party status; those candidates would also openly endorse the Green candidate in that particular constituency. The party ran two candidates in the 2013 election and no candidates in the 2017 election. The party de-registered with Elections BC effective October 2019.

== See also ==
- List of British Columbia political parties
- Legal issues of cannabis
- Marijuana parties
- Marijuana Party of Canada
