= Niki Sharma =

Canadian politician

Niki Sharma KC MLA
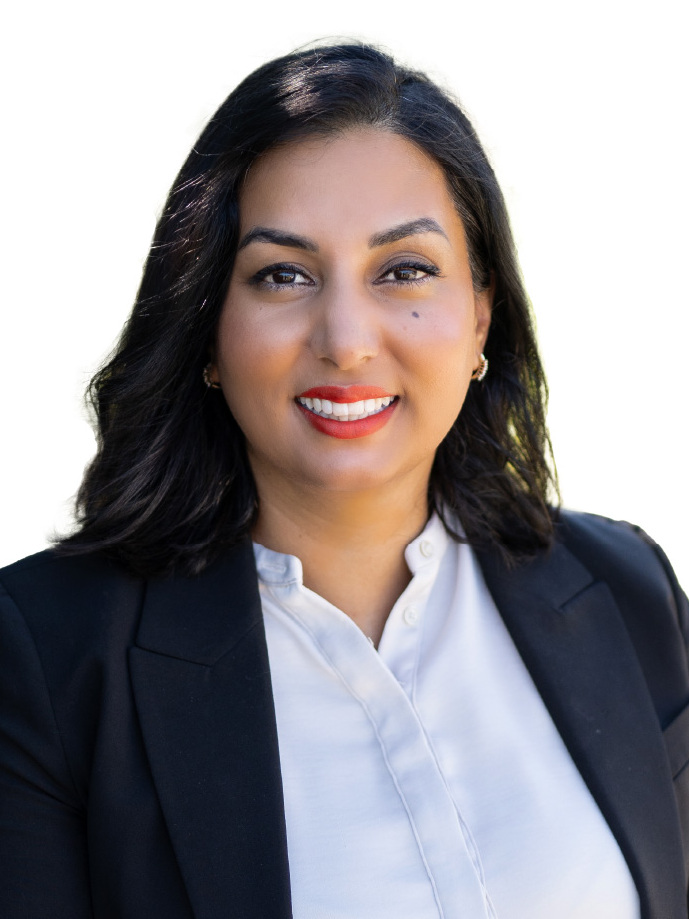
- Campaign portrait, 2024

16th Deputy Premier of British Columbia
- In office November 18, 2024 – November 20, 2026
- Premier: David Eby
- Preceded by: Mike Farnworth
- Succeeded by: Claire Rattée

Attorney General of British Columbia
- In office December 7, 2022 – November 20, 2026
- Premier: David Eby
- Preceded by: Murray Rankin (acting)
- Succeeded by: Caroline Elliott

Parliamentary Secretary for Community Development and Non-Profits of British Columbia
- In office November 26, 2020 – December 7, 2022
- Premier: John Horgan; David Eby
- Preceded by: Position established
- Succeeded by: Megan Dykeman

Member of the British Columbia Legislative Assembly for Vancouver-Hastings
- Incumbent
- Assumed office October 24, 2020
- Preceded by: Shane Simpson

Personal details
- Born: 1979 or 1980 (age 46–47) Lethbridge, Alberta, Canada
- Party: New Democratic
- Other political affiliations: Vision Vancouver (municipal)
- Education: University of Alberta
- Profession: Lawyer

Niki Sharma KC MLA (born 1979 or 1980) is a Canadian politician and lawyer who has represented the electoral district of Vancouver-Hastings in the Legislative Assembly of British Columbia since 2020. A member of the New Democratic Party, she served as Attorney General of British Columbia from 2022 to 2026 and as Deputy Premier from 2024 to 2026 in cabinet under Premier David Eby.

== Early life and career ==
Born in Lethbridge, Alberta, Sharma grew up in Sparwood, British Columbia, with her three sisters. Her parents immigrated from India; her father Pal ran a small business in Sparwood, while her mother Rose, who is a botanist by trade, ran for municipal council three times without being elected.

After graduating from the University of Alberta Faculty of Law, she joined Vancouver law firm Donovan & Company in 2005, specializing in aboriginal law. Prior to her election to the legislature, Sharma served as vice-chair of the board of directors for Vancity since 2016, and Senior Oil and Gas Campaigner for Stand.earth, an environmental organization founded in 2000.

== Political career ==
She ran as a Vision Vancouver candidate in the 2011 Vancouver municipal election and was elected a commissioner of the Vancouver Park Board, at one point serving as chair of the board. She then ran under the Vision banner for Vancouver City Council in the 2014 municipal election but was unsuccessful.

With incumbent Vancouver-Hastings member of the Legislative Assembly Shane Simpson declining to run in the 2020 provincial election, Sharma was named the BC NDP candidate for the riding and won the seat with 60.6 per cent of the vote. On November 26, 2020, Sharma was named Parliamentary Secretary for Community Development and Non-Profits by Premier John Horgan.

On December 7, 2022, she was appointed by Premier David Eby as Attorney General of British Columbia and therefore automatically became a King's Counsel. She became the first South Asian Canadian woman to serve in that cabinet post.

In 2023, the bereavement counselling group Moms Stop the Harm wrote to Niki Sharma requesting a forensic audit into the recovery industry due to an untracked number of deaths and number of other recent abuses occurring at their sites.

In 2024, Sharma and the BC NDP unsuccessfully tried to appeal an injunction against Bill 34, The Restricting Public Consumption Act; notably, their team provided no evidence on how the injunction could be causing harm.

== Electoral history ==
2026 British Columbia general election: Vancouver-Hastings
** Preliminary results — Not yet official **
Party	Candidate	Votes	%	±%
New Democratic	Niki Sharma	11,071	51.27	
Conservative	Phyllis Tang	5,344	24.75	
Green	Kyra Philbert	4,168	19.30	
CentreBC	Christian Bosio	542	2.51	
Libertarian	Phil Webb	240	1.11	
Communist	Kimball Cariou	182	0.84	
Total valid votes		21,547	99.78	
Total rejected ballots		47	0.22	
Turnout		21,594		
Registered voters				
Source: Elections BC
New Democratic hold		Swing		−6.95

2024 British Columbia general election: Vancouver-Hastings
Party	Candidate	Votes	%	±%	Expenditures
New Democratic	Niki Sharma	14,237	64.1%	+3.54	
Conservative	Jacob Burdge	5,391	24.3%		
Green	Bridget Burns	2,409	10.9%	-8.64	
Independent	Zsolt Kiss	157	0.7%		
Total valid votes		22,194	–		
Total rejected ballots					
Turnout					
Registered voters					
Source: Elections BC

2020 British Columbia general election: Vancouver-Hastings
Party	Candidate	Votes	%	±%	Expenditures
New Democratic	Niki Sharma	13,362	60.56	+0.58	$23,640.61
Green	Bridget Burns	4,312	19.54	+1.87	$3,816.71
Liberal	Alex Read	3,885	17.61	−3.88	$4,639.54
Libertarian	Gölök Z Buday	321	1.45	–	$550.68
Communist	Kimball Cariou	184	0.83	−0.03	$123.40
Total valid votes		22,064	100.00	–	
Total rejected ballots		192	0.86	+0.08	
Turnout		22,256	51.37	−8.22	
Registered voters		43,322			
New Democratic hold		Swing		−0.65	
Source: Elections BC

2014 Vancouver municipal election: City Council
Party	Candidate	Votes	%	Elected
Green	(I) Adriane Carr	74,077	40.77	✓
NPA	(I) George Affleck	68,419	37.65	✓
NPA	(I) Elizabeth Ball	67,195	36.98	✓
NPA	Melissa De Genova	63,134	34.74	✓
Vision	(I) Heather Deal	62,698	34.51	✓
Vision	(I) Kerry Jang	62,595	34.45	✓
Vision	(I) Andrea Reimer	62,316	34.29	✓
Vision	Raymond Louie	61,903	34.07	✓
Vision	(I) Tim Stevenson	57,640	31.72	✓
Vision	(I) Geoff Meggs	56,831	31.28	✓
NPA	Ian Robertson	56,319	30.99	
NPA	Gregory Baker	55,721	30.67	
NPA	Suzanne Scott	55,486	30.54	
NPA	Ken Low	54,971	30.25	
NPA	Rob McDowell	53,596	29.50	
Vision	(I) Tony Tang	49,414	27.19	
Vision	Niki Sharma	48,987	26.96	
Green	Cleta Brown	47,564	26.18	
Green	Pete Fry	46,522	25.60	
COPE	Lisa Barrett	35,234	19.39	
COPE	Tim Louis	31,650	17.42	
OneCity	RJ Aquino	30,050	16.54	
COPE	Gayle Gavin	25,547	14.06	
COPE	Jennifer O'Keefee	23,121	12.72	
COPE	Sid Chow Tan	20,948	11.53	
COPE	Audrey "sχɬemtəna:t" Siegl	19,258	10.60	
COPE	Keith Higgins	18,219	10.02	
Vancouver 1st	Mercedes Wong	17,493	9.62	
COPE	Wilson Munoz	13,756	7.57	
Cedar Party	Glen Chernen	9,577	5.27	
Vancouver 1st	Federico Fuoco	9,041	4.98	
Cedar Party	Nicholas Chernen	8,724	4.80	
Independent	Lena Ling	8,197	4.51	
Hotel Workers United – Local 40	Ferdinad Ramos	7,986	4.39	
Vancouver 1st	Jesse Johl	7,953	4.38	
Cedar Party	Charlene Gunn	6,512	3.58	
Vancouver 1st	Elena Murgoci	6,140	3.38	
Independent	David Angus	5,895	3.24	
Cedar Party	Jeremy Gustafson	5,098	2.81	
Independent	Grant Fraser	5,096	2.80	
Vancouver 1st	Milan Kljajic	4,881	2.69	
Independent	Anthony Guitar	4,375	2.41	
Independent	Kelly Alm	4,038	2.22	
Independent Democratic Electors Alliance	Rick Orser	3,548	1.95	
Independent	Marc Boyer	3,329	1.83	
Independent	Rajiv Pandey	3,229	1.78	
Independent	Cord Ted Copeland	3,202	1.76	
Independent	Abraham Deocera	3,160	1.74	
Independent	Ludvik Skalicky	1,797	0.99	

2011 Vancouver municipal election: Park Board
Party	Candidate	Votes	%	Elected
Vision	(I) Constance Barnes	63,952	44.16	✓
Vision	(I) Sarah Blyth	62,198	42.95	✓
Vision	(I) Aaron Jasper	58,343	40.29	✓
Vision	Niki Sharma	58,330	40.28	✓
NPA	Melissa De Genova	56,501	39.01	✓
NPA	John Coupar	50,375	34.78	✓
Vision	Trevor Loke	49,878	34.44	✓
NPA	Casey Crawford	49,020	33.85	
NPA	Gabby Kalaw	48,600	33.56	
NPA	Jason Upton	46,261	31.94	
NPA	Dave Pasin	46,005	31.77	
Green	(I) Stuart Mackinnon	44,761	30.91	
COPE	Brent Granby	42,769	29.53	
COPE	Donalda Greenwell-Baker	39,033	26.95	
Independent Democratic Electoral Alliance	Jamie Lee Hamilton	19,495	13.46	
Independent	Juliet Victoria Andalis	12,693	8.76	
Independent	Eleanor Hadley	10,754	9.37	
Independent	Andrew Murray	9,819	6.78	
Independent	Tammy Truong	8,917	6.16	
Independent	Peter Raymond Haskell	5,540	3.83	
Independent	Freyja Pri Toor	5,062	3.50	
Note: (I) indicates an incumbent park commissioner
