= Adriane Carr =

Canadian politician (born 1952)

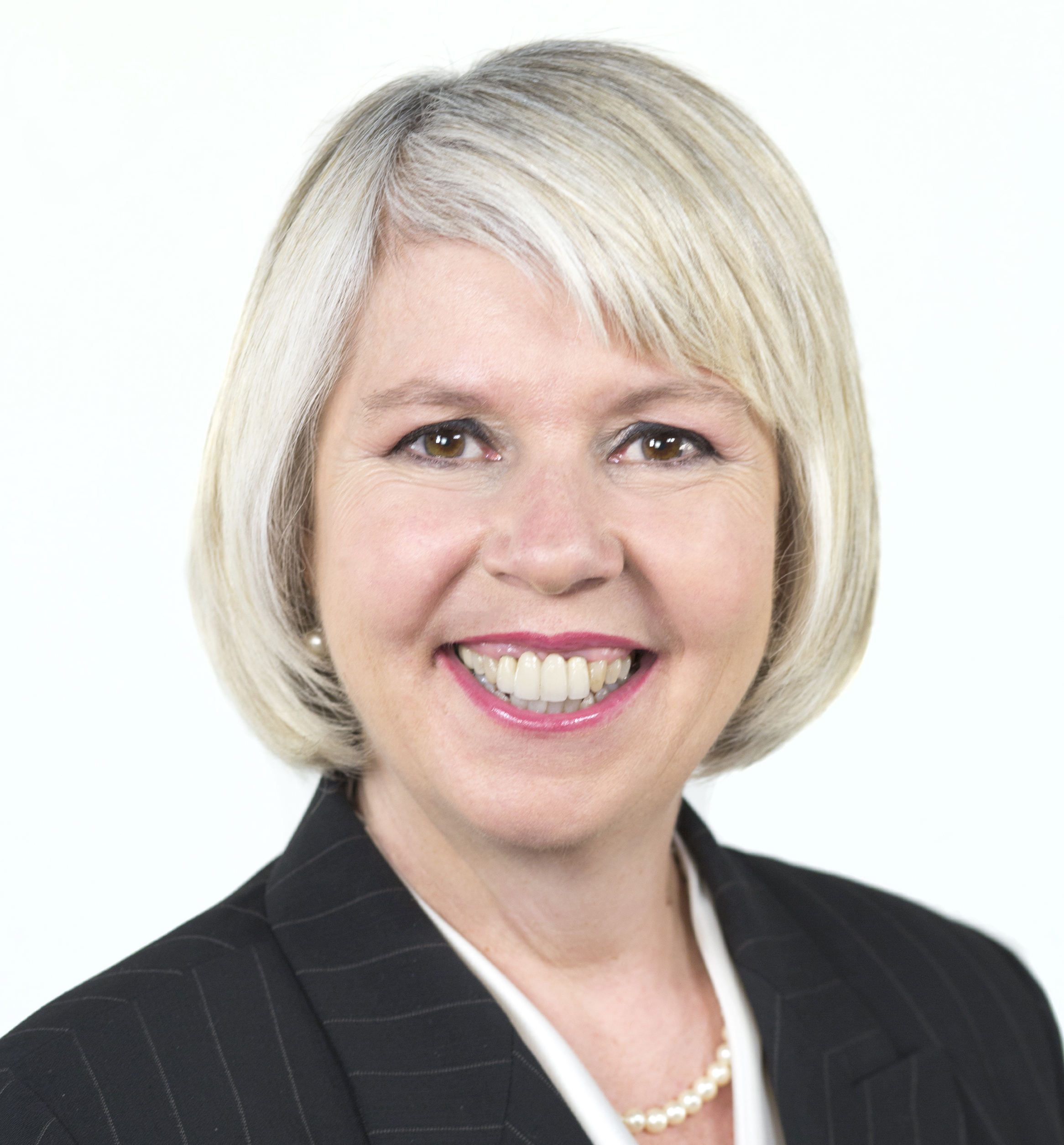
- Carr in 2014

Vancouver City Councillor
- In office December 2011 – 15 January 2025

Deputy leader of the Green Party of Canada
- In office 2006 – 22 January 2014 Serving with Georges Laraque
- Leader: Elizabeth May

Leader of the Green Party of British Columbia
- In office 2000–2006
- Preceded by: Stuart Parker
- Succeeded by: Jane Sterk
- In office 1983–1985
- Preceded by: Office established
- Succeeded by: Stuart Parker (1996)

Personal details
- Born: 1952 (age 73–74) Vancouver, British Columbia, Canada
- Party: Green Party of Canada; Green Party of British Columbia; Green Party of Vancouver
- Education: University of British Columbia (BA, MA)

Adriane Carr (born 1952) is a Canadian politician and environmental activist who was a founding member of the Green Party of British Columbia. She served as the party's leader from 1983 to 1985 and again from 2000 to 2006. At the federal level, she served as deputy leader of the Green Party of Canada from 2006 to 2014. She was also a member of Vancouver City Council from 2011 to 2025.

In the 2005 provincial election, Carr received over 25 percent of the vote in her home riding of Powell River-Sunshine Coast. In September 2006, she was appointed by federal Green Party leader Elizabeth May, to be one of her two deputy leaders.

After two losses as a federal candidate in the Vancouver Centre electoral district (2008 and 2011), Carr was elected to Vancouver City Council in November 2011. She was the sole candidate of the Green Party of Vancouver for one of 10 seats in the at-large election held in the 2011 municipal election. This was her first electoral success in eight attempts, and she was the first person elected under the Green Party banner to the council of a major Canadian city. She was re-elected in 2014, 2018, and 2022. She resigned in January 2025, citing disagreements with Mayor Ken Sim.

== Early life and education ==
Carr was born in Vancouver and raised in the Lower Mainland and the Kootenays. She earned a master's degree in urban geography from the University of British Columbia in 1980 and taught at Langara College.

== Environmentalism ==
Carr was a co-founder of the Green Party of British Columbia, the first Green Party in North America, and served as its unpaid spokesperson (leader) from 1983 to 1985. She left teaching at Langara College in 1989 to work full-time for the Western Canada Wilderness Committee, having been a volunteer for WCWC from shortly after it was co-founded by her later-to-be husband, Paul George and Richard Krieger.

During her time working for WCWC, among other things, Carr led the organization's international campaigns and played a lead role in bringing together First Nations, environmental groups, logging companies and all levels of government in the successful campaign to establish a UNESCO Biosphere Reserve in Clayoquot Sound. From 1992 until 2000, WCWC (now called the Wilderness Committee) was led by a four-person committee of paid employees comprising Carr, Paul George, activist Joe Foy, and the organization's chief financial officer. Carr left the organization in 2000 to run for the leadership of the Green Party of British Columbia (BC Green Party).

== Provincial and federal politics ==
Carr has been the BC Green Party leader on two separate occasions. She was the party's leader in the 1983 provincial election, held shortly after the party's founding. Carr ran in the two-member electoral district (called a riding in Canada) of Vancouver-Point Grey, and finished last in a field of eight candidates with 1549 votes. She also ran as a Green candidate for the Vancouver School Board in 1984, but after this, besides maintaining her membership, she had little further involvement with the provincial Green Party until the late 1990s.

The BC Green Party was led from 1993 to 2000 by Stuart Parker (whom Carr endorsed during both of his runs for the party leadership in 1993 and 1997) and its ideological direction was largely guided by former members of the New Democratic Party during this period. Carr emerged as a rival to Parker at the party's 1999 policy convention. Parker was defeated in a non-confidence motion at an annual general meeting held in Squamish in March 2000. Tom Hetherington was selected as interim leader by the new directors elected at that March meeting. A leadership contest was held, and on 23 September 2000, Carr defeated Andy Shadrack and Wally du Temple to become party leader for a second time.

Carr ran in the 2001 election in the riding of Powell River-Sunshine Coast, against former Liberal leader and then-NDP cabinet minister Gordon Wilson. She was included in the televised leaders' debate along with Liberal leader Gordon Campbell and NDP premier Ujjal Dosanjh. The Greens hoped to be viewed as a progressive alternative for voters. Carr finished third in her riding with 6316 votes (27%), against 6349 for Wilson (28%) and 9904 for victorious Liberal Harold Long. The Green Party received 12.4 percent of the provincial vote in this election, a significant increase from its 2 percent total in the 1996 BC election. The party's largest number of votes was received in Saanich-Gulf Islands, one of only 17 constituencies that had been voting Liberal since 1991.

In 2004, Carr ran for the Greens in a by-election in Surrey-Panorama Ridge, held following the resignation of Liberal Gulzar Singh Cheema. She finished a distant third with 8.4 percent of the vote as the NDP recovered to win the riding. This result was a harbinger of the party's decline in popularity in the 2005 general election, where its share of the vote fell to 9 percent.

Carr was a vocal supporter of a mixed-member proportional (MMP) electoral system. In 2002 she became the proponent of an initiative under the Recall and Initiative Act to hold a referendum on whether or not to adopt MMP in BC, dubbed the Free Your Vote campaign. Having obtained nearly 100,000 signatures in support of the initiative, Free Your Vote became the largest voting reform organization in the province and increased awareness and support amongst Greens and non-Greens alike for electoral reform.

When the Citizens' Assembly on Electoral Reform recommended a single-transferable vote system, Carr expressed strong opposition, favouring MMP. However, she supported a resolution at the subsequent BC Green convention that her party officially take a neutral stance letting candidates decide for themselves whether or not to support the Citizens' Assembly proposal. Almost all Green candidates actively campaigned for the electoral reform referendum in the 2005 election.

In the 2005 election, Carr was again included in the leaders' debate, this time with Premier Gordon Campbell and NDP leader Carole James. Carr was expected to be strong competition in her riding of Powell River-Sunshine Coast but finished third again with 25 percent of the vote (a decline of 2%), 14 percent behind the victorious NDP candidate. At the annual Green convention following the 2005 election, Carr received 85 percent approval in a confidence vote among party membership.

After successfully co-chairing a campaign to elect Elizabeth May as leader of the Green Party of Canada, Carr resigned her position of leader of the BC Green Party in September 2006 to become one of two deputy leaders of the federal Green Party.

In the 2008 federal election, Carr ran as the Green candidate in the Vancouver Centre riding against Liberal incumbent Hedy Fry. Fry was re-elected, while Carr garnered 18.3 percent of the vote. Carr had the Green Party's fourth highest percentage of votes in the nation. Carr ran once more against Hedy Fry in the 2011 federal election, receiving 15.4 percent of the vote and placing fourth.

== Municipal politics ==
Carr ran for city council in the 2011 municipal election as the lone Green Party of Vancouver candidate. She received 48,648 votes, putting her in 10th place, 91 votes ahead of the next candidate below her, but securing her election as a city councillor. She was the first Green councillor ever elected in a major Canadian city.

In the 2014 municipal election, Carr received the highest number of votes of any council candidate with 74,077 votes – 5,658 votes ahead of her closest competitor – and helped to create the largest team of elected Greens in Canadian history.

In the 2018 municipal election, Carr was again elected with the highest number of votes and was joined by fellow Green Party members Pete Fry and Michael Wiebe on council. The Greens also elected three candidates each to the Vancouver School Board and Vancouver Park Board.

Carr was re-elected to city council in the 2022 Vancouver election after declining to run for mayor. She placed eighth with 41,831 votes, the highest vote share for a non-ABC Vancouver candidate, though the Greens' popular vote declined along with most other centre-left parties, while the centre-right ABC councillors formed a new council majority.

== Electoral history ==
Election	Type	Total votes	% of popular vote	Place
Vancouver-Point Grey 1983	Provincial general	1,549	3.6% (1.8%) (Note: Vancouver-Point Grey was a double-member riding; although she received only 1.8 percent of the total votes cast, approximately 3.6 percent of local electors voted for Carr.)	8th
Vancouver School Board 1984 (Note: Vancouver's school board is elected by a citywide (at-large) vote through which a total of nine positions are filled.)	Municipal general			
Powell River-Sunshine Coast 2001	Provincial general	6,316	27.0%	3rd
Surrey-Panorama Ridge 2004	Provincial by-election	1,053	8.4%	3rd
Powell River-Sunshine Coast 2005	Provincial general	6,585	25.8%	3rd
Vancouver-Centre 2008	Federal general	10,354	18.3%	4th
Vancouver-Centre 2011	Federal general	9,089	15.4%	4th
Vancouver City Council 2011	Municipal general	48,648		10th – elected
Vancouver City Council 2014	Municipal general	74,077		1st – elected
Vancouver City Council 2018	Municipal general	69,730		1st – elected
Vancouver City Council 2022	Municipal general	41,831		8th – elected

2022 Vancouver municipal election: Vancouver City Council
Party	Candidate	Votes	%	Elected
ABC Vancouver	Sarah Kirby-Yung (X)	72,545	42.30	✓
ABC Vancouver	Lisa Dominato (X)	70,415	41.05	✓
ABC Vancouver	Brian Montague	68,618	40.01	✓
ABC Vancouver	Mike Klassen	65,586	38.24	✓
ABC Vancouver	Peter Meiszner	63,275	36.90	✓
ABC Vancouver	Rebecca Bligh (X)	62,765	36.60	✓
ABC Vancouver	Lenny Zhou	62,393	36.39	✓
Green	Adriane Carr (X)	41,831	24.39	✓
OneCity	Christine Boyle (X)	38,465	22.43	✓
Green	Pete Fry (X)	37,270	21.73	✓
Forward Together	Dulcy Anderson	33,985	19.82	
OneCity	Iona Bonamis	33,745	19.68	
Forward Together	Tesicca Truong	32,900	19.18	
COPE	Jean Swanson (X)	32,833	19.15	
Green	Michael Wiebe (X)	30,377	17.71	
OneCity	Ian Cromwell	29,833	17.40	
OneCity	Matthew Norris	29,663	17.30	
Forward Together	Alvin Singh	29,049	16.94	
NPA	Melissa De Genova (X)	26,578	15.50	
COPE	Breen Ouellette	24,881	14.51	
Forward Together	Jeanette Ashe	22,432	13.08	
Forward Together	Russil Wvong	22,107	12.89	
Green	Devyani Singh	21,255	12.39	
TEAM	Cleta Brown	20,854	12.16	
Green	Stephanie Smith	20,408	11.90	
Forward Together	Hilary Brown	19,902	11.61	
COPE	Nancy Trigueros	19,152	11.17	
TEAM	Sean Nardi	18,353	10.70	
TEAM	Grace Quan	17,955	10.47	
COPE	Tanya Webking	17,675	10.31	
TEAM	Bill Tieleman	17,240	10.05	
TEAM	Stephen Roberts	16,261	9.48	
Vision	Stuart Mackinnon	15,865	9.25	
NPA	Morning Lee	14,083	8.21	
TEAM	Param Nijjar	13,950	8.13	
VOTE Socialist	Sean Orr	13,744	8.01	
Progress Vancouver	Asha Hayer	13,107	7.64	
NPA	Ken Charko	12,083	7.47	
Vision	Lesli Boldt	11,070	6.46	
NPA	Elaine Allan	10,917	6.37	
Affordable Housing Coalition	Eric Redmond	10,617	6.19	
NPA	Arezo Zarrabian	10,361	6.04	
Progress Vancouver	Marie Noelle Rosa	10,111	5.90	
Progress Vancouver	Morgane Oger	10,015	5.84	
Progress Vancouver	David Chin	9,354	5.45	
Progress Vancouver	May He	8,593	5.01	
NPA	Cinnamon Bhayani	8,586	5.01	
Independent	Lina Vargas	7,714	4.50	
Vision	Honieh Barzegari	6,831	3.98	
Progress Vancouver	Mauro Francis	6,556	3.82	
Independent	Mark Bowen	5,706	3.33	
Independent	Dominic Denofrio	4,927	2.87	
Independent	Amy "Evil Genius" Fox	3,711	2.16	
Independent	Jeremy MacKenzie	3,446	2.01	
Independent	Kyra Philbert	3,382	1.97	
Independent	Tim Lý	3,339	1.95	
Independent	Marlo Franson	2,866	1.67	
Independent	Amie Peacock	2,745	1.60	
Independent	K. R. Alm	2,301	1.34	
"(X)" indicates incumbent city councillor. Percentage of votes shown is percentage of voters who voted, not votes cast.
Source: City of Vancouver

2018 Vancouver municipal election: Vancouver City Council
Party	Candidate	Votes	%	Elected
Green	(I) Adriane Carr	69,739	39.52	✓
Green	Pete Fry	61,806	35.03	✓
NPA	(I) Melissa De Genova	53,251	30.18	✓
COPE	Jean Swanson	48,865	27.69	✓
NPA	Colleen Hardwick	47,747	27.06	✓
Green	(O) Michael Wiebe	45,593	25.84	✓
OneCity	Christine Boyle	45,455	25.76	✓
NPA	(O) Lisa Dominato	44,689	25.33	✓
NPA	Rebecca Bligh	44,053	24.97	✓
NPA	(O) Sarah Kirby-Yung	43,581	24.70	✓
NPA	David Grewal	41,913	23.75	
Green	David H. Wong	40,887	23.17	
Vision	(I) Heather Deal	39,529	22.40	
COPE	Derrick O'Keefe	38,305	21.71	
NPA	Justin P. Goodrich	37,917	21.49	
COPE	Anne Roberts	36,531	20.70	
OneCity	Brandon O. Yan	36,167	20.50	
NPA	Jojo Quimpo	34,601	19.61	
Independent	Sarah Blyth	29,456	16.69	
Vision	Tanya Paz	28,836	16.34	
Vision	Diego Cardona	27,325	15.49	
Vision	(O) Catherine Evans	25,124	14.24	
Independent	(O) Erin Shum	23,331	13.22	
Vancouver 1st	Ken Low	21,908	12.42	
Independent	Adrian Crook	17,392	9.86	
Vision	Wei Q. Zhang	16,734	9.48	
Coalition Vancouver	Ken Charko	16,366	9.28	
Coalition Vancouver	James Lin	16,191	9.18	
Independent	Wade Grant	15,422	8.74	
Independent	Taqdir K. Bhandal	15,326	8.69	
Vancouver 1st	Elizabeth Taylor	15,184	8.61	
Coalition Vancouver	Penny Mussio	14,886	8.44	
Yes Vancouver	Brinder Bains	13,948	7.90	
Yes Vancouver	Stephanie Ostler	13,530	7.67	
Coalition Vancouver	Jason Xie	13,424	7.61	
Yes Vancouver	Glynnis C. Chan	13,218	7.49	
Coalition Vancouver	Glen Chernen	13,148	7.45	
Coalition Vancouver	Morning Li	12,614	7.15	
Vancouver 1st	Nycki K. Basra	12,133	6.88	
Yes Vancouver	Jaspreet Virdi	12,124	6.87	
Coalition Vancouver	Franco Peta	11,193	6.34	
Yes Vancouver	Phyllis Tang	11,902	6.75	
Independent	Rob McDowell	11,828	6.70	
Independent	Penny Noble	11,435	6.48	
Independent	Graham Cook	11,084	6.28	
Vancouver 1st	Michelle C. Mollineaux	8,819	5.00	
ProVancouver	Raza Mirza	8,783	4.98	
Vancouver 1st	Jesse Johl	8,609	4.88	
Independent	Barbara Buchanan	8,180	4.64	
ProVancouver	Breton Crellin	7,856	4.45	
Vancouver 1st	Elishia Perosa	7,489	4.24	
Independent	Anastasia Koutalianos	7,469	4.23	
Independent	Abubakar Khan	7,239	4.10	
Vancouver 1st	John Malusa	6,597	3.74	
Independent	Lisa Kristiansen	6,506	3.69	
ProVancouver	Rohana D. Rezel	6,336	3.59	
Independent	Françoise Raunet	5,891	3.34	
Independent	Hamdy El-Rayes	5,381	3.05	
Independent	Hsin-Chen Fu	5,007	2.84	
Independent	Justin Caudwell	4,488	2.54	
Independent	Harry Miedzygorski	4,308	2.44	
Independent	Gordon T. Kennedy	4,297	2.44	
Independent	Ashley Hughes	3,965	2.25	
Independent	Kelly Alm	3,440	1.95	
Independent	Marlo Franson	3,316	1.88	
Independent	John Spark	3,287	1.86	
Independent	Katherine Ramdeen	3,082	1.75	
Independent	Spike Peachey	2,863	1.62	
Independent	Larry J. Falls	2,768	1.57	
Independent	Elke Porter	2,515	1.43	
Independent	Ted Copeland	1,946	1.10	

2014 Vancouver municipal election: Vancouver City Council
Party	Candidate	Votes	%	Elected
Candidate Name	Party	Votes	% of votes	Elected
(I) Adriane Carr	Green Party of Vancouver	74,077	40.77%	X
(I) George Affleck	Non-Partisan Association	68,419	37.65%	X
(I) Elizabeth Ball	Non-Partisan Association	67,195	36.98%	X
Melissa De Genova	Non-Partisan Association	63,134	34.74%	X
(I) Heather Deal	Vision Vancouver	62,698	34.51%	X
(I) Kerry Jang	Vision Vancouver	62,595	34.45%	X
(I) Andrea Reimer	Vision Vancouver	62,316	34.29%	X
(I) Raymond Louie	Vision Vancouver	61,903	34.07%	X
(I) Tim Stevenson	Vision Vancouver	57,640	31.72%	X
(I) Geoff Meggs	Vision Vancouver	56,831	31.28%	X
Ian Robertson	Non-Partisan Association	56,319	30.99%	
Gregory Baker	Non-Partisan Association	55,721	30.67%	
Suzanne Scott	Non-Partisan Association	55,486	30.54%	
Ken Low	Non-Partisan Association	54,971	30.25%	
Rob McDowell	Non-Partisan Association	53,596	29.50%	
(I) Tony Tang	Vision Vancouver	49,414	27.19%	
Niki Sharma	Vision Vancouver	48,987	26.96%	
Cleta Brown	Green Party of Vancouver	47,564	26.18%	
Pete Fry	Green Party of Vancouver	46,522	25.60%	
Lisa Barrett	Coalition of Progressive Electors	35,234	19.39%	
Tim Louis	Coalition of Progressive Electors	31,650	17.42%	
RJ Aquino	OneCity Vancouver	30,050	16.54%	
Gayle Gavin	Coalition of Progressive Electors	25,547	14.06%	
Jennifer O'Keefee	Coalition of Progressive Electors	23,121	12.72%	
Sid Chow Tan	Coalition of Progressive Electors	20,948	11.53%	
Audrey "sχɬemtəna:t" Siegl	Coalition of Progressive Electors	19,258	10.60%	
Keith Higgins	Coalition of Progressive Electors	18,219	10.02%	
Mercedes Wong	Vancouver 1st	17,493	9.62%	
Wilson Munoz	Coalition of Progressive Electors	13,756	7.57%	
Glen Chernen	Cedar Party	9,577	5.27%	
Federico Fuoco	Vancouver 1st	9,041	4.98%	
Nicholas Chernen	Cedar Party	8,724	4.80%	
Lena Ling	Independent	8,197	4.51%	
Ferdinad Ramos	Hotel Workers United – Local 40	7,986	4.39%	
Jesse Johl	Vancouver 1st	7,953	4.38%	
Charlene Gunn	Cedar Party	6,512	3.58%	
Elena Murgoci	Vancouver 1st	6,140	3.38%	
David Angus	Independent	5,895	3.24%	
Jeremy Gustafson	Cedar Party	5,098	2.81%	
Grant Fraser	Independent	5,096	2.80%	
Milan Kljajic	Vancouver 1st	4,881	2.69%	
Anthony Guitar	Independent	4,375	2.41%	
Kelly Alm	Independent	4,038	2.22%	
Rick Orser	Independent Democratic Electors Alliance	3,548	1.95%	
Marc Boyer	Independent	3,329	1.83%	
Rajiv Pandey	Independent	3,229	1.78%	
Cord Ted Copeland	Independent	3,202	1.76%	
Abraham Deocera	Independent	3,160	1.74%	
Ludvik Skalicky	Independent	1,797	0.99%	

2011 Vancouver municipal election: Vancouver City Council
Party	Candidate	Votes	%	Elected
Candidate name	Party affiliation	Votes	% of votes	Elected
(I) Raymond Louie	Vision Vancouver	63,273	43.69	X
(I) Kerry Jang	Vision Vancouver	61,931	42.76	X
(I) Heather Deal	Vision Vancouver	61,368	42.37	X
(I) Andrea Reimer	Vision Vancouver	60,593	41.84	X
(I) Tim Stevenson	Vision Vancouver	56,638	39.11	X
(I) Geoff Meggs	Vision Vancouver	56,184	38.79	X
Tony Tang	Vision Vancouver	53,873	37.20	X
Elizabeth Ball	Non-Partisan Association	51,607	35.63	X
George Affleck	Non-Partisan Association	51,145	35.32	X
Adriane Carr	Green Party of Vancouver	48,648	33.59	X
(I) Ellen Woodsworth	Coalition of Progressive Electors	48,557	33.53	
Bill Yuen	Non-Partisan Association	48,407	33.42	
Mike Klassen	Non-Partisan Association	47,868	33.05	
Ken Charko	Non-Partisan Association	45,373	31.33	
Bill McCreery	Non-Partisan Association	45,114	31.15	
Francis Wong	Non-Partisan Association	44,707	30.87	
Tim Louis	Coalition of Progressive Electors	43,926	30.33	
Sean Bickerton	Non-Partisan Association	43,289	29.89	
Joe Carangi	Non-Partisan Association	41,460	28.63	
RJ Aquino	Coalition of Progressive Electors	39,054	26.97	
Jason Lamarche	Non-Partisan Association	37,286	25.75	
Sandy Garossino	Independent	20,866	14.41	
Elizabeth Murphy	Neighbourhoods for a Sustainable Vancouver	19,644	13.56	
Nicole Benson	Neighbourhoods for a Sustainable Vancouver	17,983	12.42	
Terry Martin	Neighbourhoods for a Sustainable Vancouver	13,025	8.99	
Marie Kerchum	Neighbourhoods for a Sustainable Vancouver	12,614	8.71	
Chris Shaw	De-Growth Vancouver	8,219	5.68	
Ian Gregson	De-Growth Vancouver	7,872	5.44	
Amy Fox	Independent	6,499	4.49	
Kelly Alm	Independent	5,525	3.82	
Grant Fraser	Independent	4,758	3.29	
Chris Masson	De-Growth Vancouver	4,690	3.24	
Lauren R.I.C.H. Gill	Independent	4,682	3.23	
Michael Singh Dharni	Independent	4,167	2.88	
Marc Tan Nguyen	Independent	4,118	2.84	
Rick Orser	Independent	3,996	2.76	
Wendythirteen	Independent	3,926	2.71	
Bang Nguyen	Independent	3,826	2.64	
Cord (Ted) Copeland	Independent	3,587	2.48	
Aaron R.I.C.H. Spires	Independent	2,200	1.52	
R H Maxwell N Bur	Independent	1,955	1.35	

2011 Canadian federal election: Vancouver Centre
Party	Candidate	Votes	%	±%	Expenditures
Liberal	Hedy Fry	18,260	31.03	–3.48	$91,536.75
New Democratic	Karen Margo Shillington	15,325	26.04	+4.73	$26,447.50
Conservative	Jennifer Clarke	15,323	26.04	+0.94	$65,135.53
Green	Adriane Carr	9,089	15.44	–2.87	$99,144.39
Libertarian	John Clarke	313	0.53	–0.07	none listed
Progressive Canadian	Michael Huenefeld	285	0.48	–	$666.48
Pirate	Travis McCrea	192	0.33	–	none listed
Marxist–Leninist	Michael Hill	62	0.11	–0.06	none listed
Total valid votes/expense limit		58,849	99.77	–	$100,554.26
Total rejected ballots		134	0.23	–0.10	
Turnout		58,983	57.71	–1.65	
Eligible voters		102,201			
Liberal hold		Swing		–4.10	
Source: Elections Canada

2008 Canadian federal election: Vancouver Centre
Party	Candidate	Votes	%	±%	Expenditures
Liberal	Hedy Fry	19,506	34.51	–9.30	$82,559.50
Conservative	Lorne Mayencourt	14,188	25.10	+4.64	$90,565.43
New Democratic	Michael Byers	12,047	21.31	–7.36	$83,751.31
Green	Adriane Carr	10,354	18.32	+12.47	$83,134.82
Libertarian	John Clarke	340	0.60	+0.07	none listed
Marxist–Leninist	Michael Hill	94	0.17	–	none listed
Total valid votes/expense limit		56,529	99.67	–	$94,404.49
Total rejected ballots		187	0.33	+0.05	
Turnout		56,716	59.37	–2.69	
Eligible voters		95,537			
Liberal hold		Swing		–6.97	
Source: Elections Canada

2005 British Columbia general election: Powell River-Sunshine Coast
Party	Candidate	Votes	%	±%	Expenditures
New Democratic	Nicholas Simons	11,099	43.45	+26.30	$108,403
Liberal	Maureen Clayton	7,702	30.15	-12.21	$102,008
Green	Adriane Carr	6,585	25.78	-1.23	$350
Refederation	Allen McIntyre	249	0.62	New	$1,110
Total valid votes		25,542	100	–	
Total rejected ballots		109	0.43		
Turnout		25,651	72.43		
Registered voters					

Surrey-Panorama Ridge by-election, 28 October 2004
Party	Candidate	Votes	%	±%
NDP	Jagrup Brar	6,740	53.59	+33.68
Liberal	Mary Polak	4,194	33.35	-25.59
Green	Adriane Carr	1,053	8.37	-0.46
Conservative	David James Evans	276	2.19	–
Reform	Shirley Abraham	246	1.96	-0.55
Independent	Joe Pal	68	0.54	–
Total Valid Votes		12,577	100.00	
Total Rejected Ballots		41	0.33	
Turnout		12,618	52.15	

2001 British Columbia general election: Powell River-Sunshine Coast
Party	Candidate	Votes	%	±%	Expenditures
Liberal	Harold Long	9,904	42.36	+24.65	$63,954
New Democratic	Gordon Wilson	6,349	27.15	-0.42	$50,409
Green	Adriane Carr	6,316	27.01	+24.66	$24,821
Marijuana	Dana Albert Larsen	812	3.48	New	$4,499
Total valid votes		23,381	100	–	
Total rejected ballots		99	0.43		
Turnout		23,480	72.43		
Registered voters					

1983 British Columbia general election: Vancouver-Point Grey
Party	Candidate	Votes	%	±	Expenditures
Liberal	Leopold Auer	1,675	1.98%		unknown
Green	Adriane Janice Carr	1,549	1.83%	–	unknown
Social Credit	Garde Basil Gardom	22,550	26.58%	–	unknown
Social Credit	Patrick Lucey McGeer	22,970	27.08%	–	unknown
Progressive Conservative	Lorne Neil MacLean	1,573	1.86%		unknown
New Democratic	Maureen Patricia Marchak	16,612	19.58%		unknown
New Democratic	Hilda Louise Thomas	15,849	18.68%		unknown
Progressive Conservative	William Fairley	2,511	3.17%		unknown
Liberal	Allan Edward Warnke	2,048	2.41%		unknown
Total valid votes		84,826	100.00%		
Total rejected ballots		480			
Turnout		%			
