= 2014 Vancouver municipal election =

Municipal election in British Columbia, Canada

- November 15, 2014

10 seats on the Vancouver City Council + 1 mayor; 9 seats on Vancouver School Board; 7 seats on Vancouver Park Board
- Turnout: 43.4% ▲8.4 pp
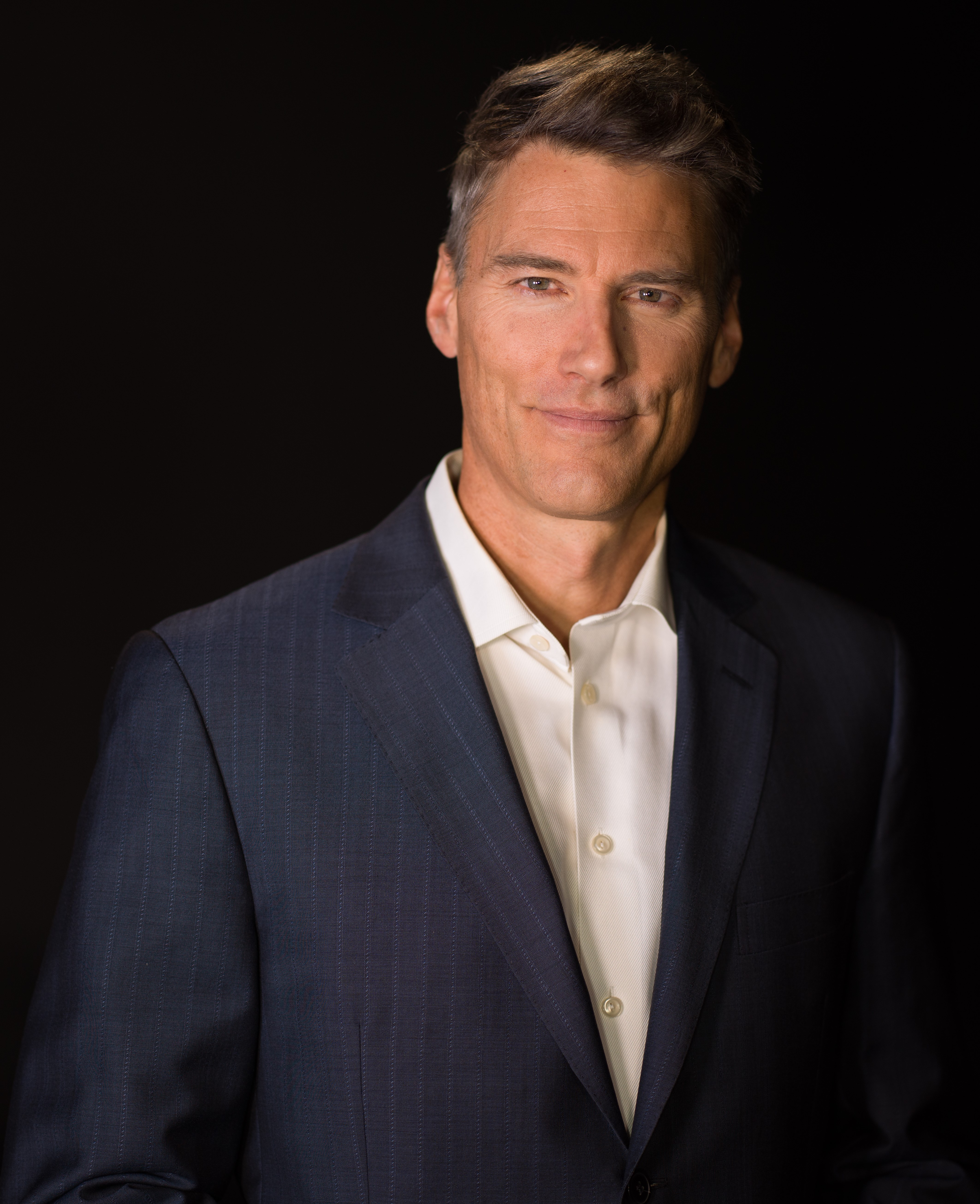

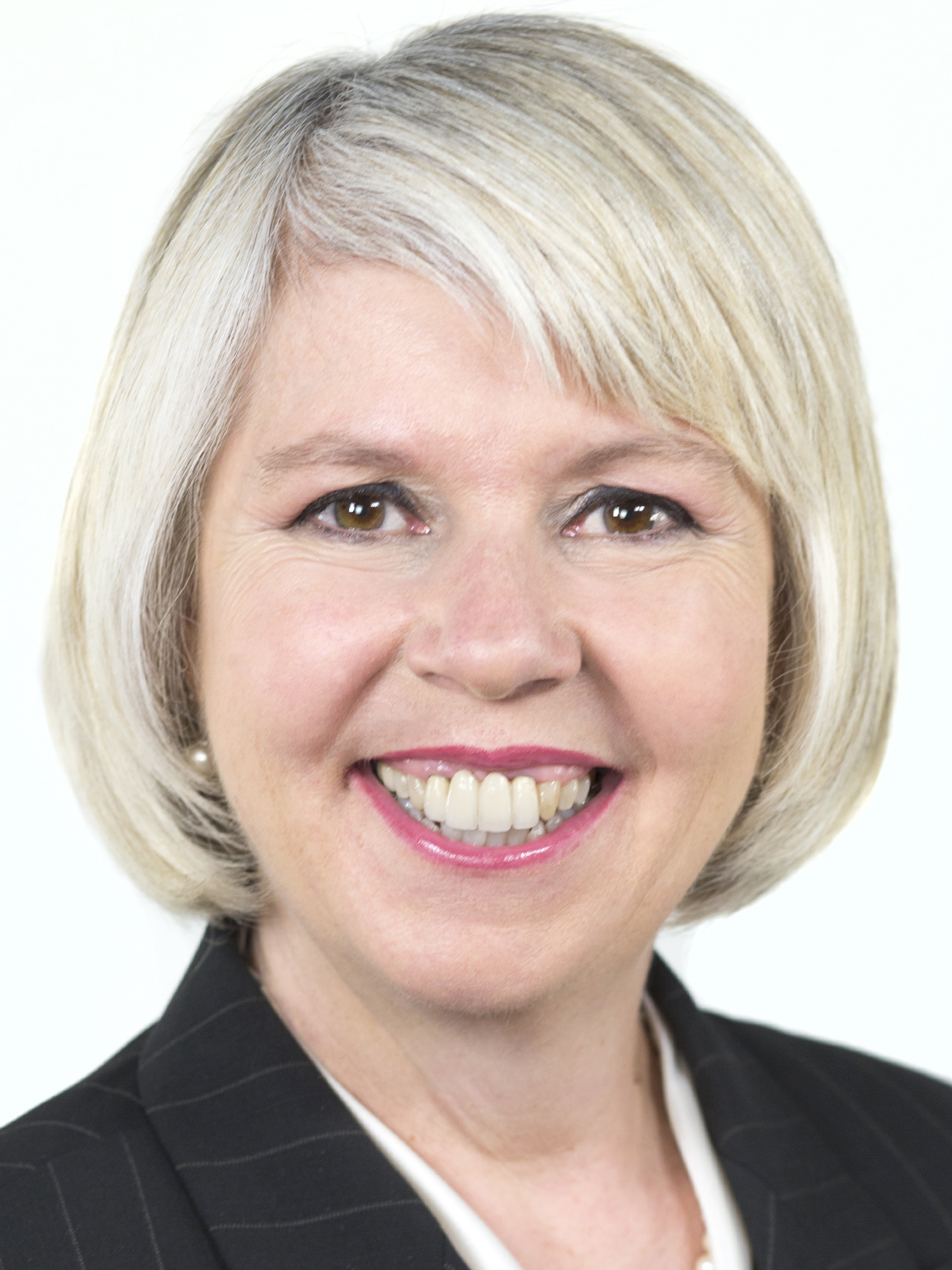
	First party	Second party	Third party
		NPA
Leader	Gregor Robertson	Kirk LaPointe	Adriane Carr (de facto)
Party	Vision	NPA	Green
Leader's seat	Mayor	Ran for Mayor (lost)	Councillor
Last election	8 seats, 53.17%	2 seats, 40.15%	1 seat, N/A
Seats won	7	3	1
Seat change	▼1	▲1	Steady
Popular vote	83,529	73,443	N/A
Percentage	45.97%	40.42%	N/A
Swing	▼7.20%	▲0.27%	N/A
	Fourth party
	COPE
Leader	Meena Wong
Party	COPE
Leader's seat	Ran for Mayor (lost)
Last election	0 seats, N/A
Seats won	0
Seat change	0
Popular vote	16,791
Percentage	9.24%
Swing	N/A
- Mayoral results on a Voronoi diagram of polling stations
Mayor before election
Gregor Robertson
Vision
Elected mayor
Gregor Robertson
Vision

The 2014 Vancouver municipal election took place on November 15, 2014, the same day as other municipalities and regional districts in British Columbia selected their new municipal governments. As with previous elections, voters elected one mayor, 10 councillors, nine school board trustees, and seven park board commissioners through plurality-at-large voting. Voters also voted on whether to approve a capital budget.

== Background ==
Incumbent mayor Gregor Robertson sought re-election with the Vision Vancouver Party, which swept the 2011 election when it elected him and all of the party's city council, park board and school board candidates. In this election, Robertson was re-elected as mayor; however, Vision representation decreased with only six councillors, four school trustees, and one park board commissioner elected. In total, ten Vision candidates were not elected, including five incumbent candidates: one councillor, three school trustees, and one park board commissioner.

The Non-Partisan Association (NPA) came into the election as the second largest party in Vancouver, with two city councillors, two park board commissioners, and one school trustee. Their mayoral candidate was journalist Kirk LaPointe who lost to Robertson in the mayoral race by 10,086 votes. The NPA team gained ground electing three councillors, four park board commissioners, and four school trustees.

The Vancouver Green Party sought to improve on its 2011 results which saw the first-ever Green Party city councillor, Adriane Carr, elected. Carr was re-elected as councillor and was actually the councillor elected with the most votes at 74,077. Additionally, two park board commissioners and one school board trustee were elected, giving the Green Party of Vancouver its best result in the history of Vancouver municipal elections.

The Coalition of Progressive Electors (COPE), which officially cut ties with former ally Vision Vancouver in 2012, lost its only elected official when school trustee Allan Wong switched from COPE to Vision Vancouver on December 8, 2013, ending decades of COPE representation in the city. COPE contested this election with its first mayoral candidate since 2002, community organizer and former NDP candidate Meena Wong. The party also had candidates for every council seat. Wong placed third in the mayoral race, and no COPE candidates were elected.

New Party Vancouver 1st ran a slate of candidates for all offices. These included Olympic bronze medal winning swimmer Brent Hayden as a park board commissioner candidate, and two incumbent school board trustees Ken Denike, and Sophia Woo, who had been expelled from the NPA in June. However, no candidates from Vancouver 1st were elected.

=== Voting ===
Nominations for the 2014 vote opened on September 30, 2014, and closed on October 10, 2014.

The 2014 election introduced a new "Vote-Anywhere" model, in which voters could cast ballots at any polling place across the city. Prior to this, voters were required to vote at polling places within the voting division in which they lived, in spite of the city using an at-large election system.

Just before 8:00 pm on election day, voting hours were extended by 45 minutes at four locations because of ballot shortages earlier in the day due to high voter turnout.

== Political parties ==
This is a list of political parties who ran candidates in the 2014 election:

Party	Leader	Political position	Notes
Vision Vancouver	Gregor Robertson	Centre-left	Vision Vancouver's leadership review on May 4, 2014, resulted in the nomination of incumbent candidates who ran for re-election for the offices they had held, including Mayor Gregor Robertson who had a 99% approval rating from members. On June 22, 2014, Vision Vancouver held a nomination meeting for candidates to fill one school trustee and four park commissioner seats. Two park board candidates dropped out of the race, but a full slate of candidates was announced on September 10, 2014.
Non-Partisan Association	Kirk LaPointe	Centre-right	NPA announced on July 14, 2014, that the party's mayoral candidate would be journalist Kirk LaPointe.
Green Party of Vancouver	Adriane Carr (de facto)	Centre-left, green politics	On March 31, 2014, the Green Party of Vancouver announced its candidates for City Council, school board and park board.
Coalition of Progressive Electors	Meena Wong	Left	COPE announced its candidates following an open Nominations Conference on September 7, 2014. One council candidate and an additional park board candidate were ratified by the party's Indigenous Equity Caucus at a later date.
Cedar Party	Glen Chernen		The Vancouver Cedar Party, launched in November 2012, believed in strong community roots.
Hotel Workers United – Local 40	Ferdinad Ramos		
Independent Democratic Electors Alliance	Jamie Lee Hamilton		
OneCity Vancouver	RJ Aquino	Centre-Left, urbanism	OneCity was a new Vancouver political party launched in May 2014 with the intention of fielding candidates for the November 2014 Municipal Election.
Public Education Project	Jane Bouey		The Public Education Project believed public education is a cornerstone of a democratic society. They wanted education, and the well-being of children and youth, to be given priority attention in the election.
Stop Party	Meynard Aubichon		
Vancouver 1st	Jesse Johl	Conservative libertarianism	Vancouver 1st was committed to bringing accountable, democratic and transparent government. Vancouver 1st was relying on grassroots support.

== Candidates and results ==
The nomination period officially opened on September 30, 2014, and closed on October 10, 2014.

(I) denotes incumbents.

=== Mayor ===
Ten candidates sought election to the position of mayor; four were affiliated with a political party and six were independents. Incumbent mayor Gregor Robertson of Vision Vancouver was re-elected for a third straight term.

2014 Vancouver municipal election: Mayor
Party	Candidate	Votes	%	Elected
Vision	Gregor Robertson	83,529	45.97	✓
NPA	Kirk LaPointe	73,443	40.42	
COPE	Meena Wong	16,791	9.24	
Independent	Bob Kasting	1,682	0.93	
Independent	Mike Hansen	714	0.39	
Independent	Jeff Hill	611	0.34	
Independent	Tim Ly	556	0.31	
Stop Party	Meynard Aubichon	508	0.28	
Independent	Cherryse Kaur Kaiser	492	0.27	
Independent	Colin Shandler	459	0.25	
Total valid votes		178, 786	100.00	
Vision hold		Swing		–7.20

=== City councillors ===
Ten councillors were elected from forty-nine candidates. Of the candidates, thirty-nine were affiliated with a political party; ten were independent. All ten incumbent councillors sought re-election: seven from Vision Vancouver, two from the NPA, and one from the Green Party. NPA candidate Melissa De Genova and Vision candidate Niki Sharma were both sitting Park Board commissioners from their respective parties. Of the ten elected councillors, six were from Vision, three were from the NPA, and one was from the Green Party.

Candidate Name	Party	Votes	% of votes	Elected
(I) Adriane Carr	Green Party of Vancouver	74,077	40.77%	X
(I) George Affleck	Non-Partisan Association	68,419	37.65%	X
(I) Elizabeth Ball	Non-Partisan Association	67,195	36.98%	X
Melissa De Genova	Non-Partisan Association	63,134	34.74%	X
(I) Heather Deal	Vision Vancouver	62,698	34.51%	X
(I) Kerry Jang	Vision Vancouver	62,595	34.45%	X
(I) Andrea Reimer	Vision Vancouver	62,316	34.29%	X
(I) Raymond Louie	Vision Vancouver	61,903	34.07%	X
(I) Tim Stevenson	Vision Vancouver	57,640	31.72%	X
(I) Geoff Meggs	Vision Vancouver	56,831	31.28%	X
Ian Robertson	Non-Partisan Association	56,319	30.99%	
Gregory Baker	Non-Partisan Association	55,721	30.67%	
Suzanne Scott	Non-Partisan Association	55,486	30.54%	
Ken Low	Non-Partisan Association	54,971	30.25%	
Rob McDowell	Non-Partisan Association	53,596	29.50%	
(I) Tony Tang	Vision Vancouver	49,414	27.19%	
Niki Sharma	Vision Vancouver	48,987	26.96%	
Cleta Brown	Green Party of Vancouver	47,564	26.18%	
Pete Fry	Green Party of Vancouver	46,522	25.60%	
Lisa Barrett	Coalition of Progressive Electors	35,234	19.39%	
Tim Louis	Coalition of Progressive Electors	31,650	17.42%	
RJ Aquino	OneCity Vancouver	30,050	16.54%	
Gayle Gavin	Coalition of Progressive Electors	25,547	14.06%	
Jennifer O'Keefee	Coalition of Progressive Electors	23,121	12.72%	
Sid Chow Tan	Coalition of Progressive Electors	20,948	11.53%	
Audrey "sχɬemtəna:t" Siegl	Coalition of Progressive Electors	19,258	10.60%	
Keith Higgins	Coalition of Progressive Electors	18,219	10.02%	
Mercedes Wong	Vancouver 1st	17,493	9.62%	
Wilson Munoz	Coalition of Progressive Electors	13,756	7.57%	
Glen Chernen	Cedar Party	9,577	5.27%	
Federico Fuoco	Vancouver 1st	9,041	4.98%	
Nicholas Chernen	Cedar Party	8,724	4.80%	
Lena Ling	Independent	8,197	4.51%	
Ferdinad Ramos	Hotel Workers United – Local 40	7,986	4.39%	
Jesse Johl	Vancouver 1st	7,953	4.38%	
Charlene Gunn	Cedar Party	6,512	3.58%	
Elena Murgoci	Vancouver 1st	6,140	3.38%	
David Angus	Independent	5,895	3.24%	
Jeremy Gustafson	Cedar Party	5,098	2.81%	
Grant Fraser	Independent	5,096	2.80%	
Milan Kljajic	Vancouver 1st	4,881	2.69%	
Anthony Guitar	Independent	4,375	2.41%	
Kelly Alm	Independent	4,038	2.22%	
Rick Orser	Independent Democratic Electors Alliance	3,548	1.95%	
Marc Boyer	Independent	3,329	1.83%	
Rajiv Pandey	Independent	3,229	1.78%	
Cord Ted Copeland	Independent	3,202	1.76%	
Abraham Deocera	Independent	3,160	1.74%	
Ludvik Skalicky	Independent	1,797	0.99%	

=== Park board commissioners ===
Seven commissioners were elected from thirty-one candidates. Of the candidates, twenty-five were affiliated with a political party; six were independent. Two incumbent commissioners sought re-election: one from Vision Vancouver and one from the NPA. Of the elected commissioners, four were from the NPA, two were from the Green Party, and one was from Vision Vancouver.

Candidate name	Party	Votes	% of votes	Elected
Catherine Evans	Vision Vancouver	64,707	35.61%	X
(I) John Coupar	Non-Partisan Association	62,970	34.65%	X
Casey Crawford	Non-Partisan Association	59,882	32.96%	X
Sarah Kirby-Yung	Non-Partisan Association	56,828	31.27%	X
Erin Shum	Non-Partisan Association	56,762	31.24%	X
Stuart Mackinnon	Green Party of Vancouver	56,406	31.04%	X
Michael Wiebe	Green Party of Vancouver	55,607	30.60%	X
Brent Granby	Vision Vancouver	54,215	29.84%	
(I) Trevor Loke	Vision Vancouver	54,199	29.83%	
Naveen Girn	Vision Vancouver	51,659	28.43%	
Jay Jagpal	Non-Partisan Association	48,909	26.92%	
Coree Tull	Vision Vancouver	46,672	25.69%	
Stéphane Mouttet	Non-Partisan Association	46,337	25.50%	
Sammie Jo Rumbaua	Vision Vancouver	42,863	23.59%	
Anita Romaniuk	Coalition of Progressive Electors	33,690	18.54%	
Ezra Bloom	Coalition of Progressive Electors	28,217	15.53%	
Cease Wyss	Coalition of Progressive Electors	21,249	11.69%	
Urooba Jamal	Coalition of Progressive Electors	18,722	10.30%	
Richard Wong	Vancouver 1st	18,655	10.27%	
Imtiaz Popat	Coalition of Progressive Electors	17,023	9.37%	
Brent Hayden	Vancouver 1st	15,599	8.86%	
Jamie Lee Hamilton	Independent Democratic Electors Alliance	14,471	7.96%	
Jenny De Castris	Independent	10,672	5.87%	
Massimo Rossetti	Vancouver 1st	9,729	5.35%	
Yogi Johl	Vancouver 1st	9,100	5.01%	
Eleanor Hadley	Independent	8,072	4.44%	
Roland Clarke	Independent	7,545	4.15%	
Earl Sunshine	Independent	6,308	3.47%	
Doug Starink	Vancouver 1st	6,275	3.45%	
James Buckshon	Independent	5,591	3.08%	
Matt Kadioglu	Independent	2,719	1.50%	

=== School board trustees ===
Nine school board trustees were elected out of twenty-eight candidates. Of the candidates, twenty-three were affiliated with a political party, and five were independent. All nine incumbent trustees sought re-election: six from Vision Vancouver (including Allan Wong, who was elected in 2011 as part of COPE, but crossed the floor to Vision Vancouver in 2013), one from the NPA, and two ex-NPA trustees: Ken Denike, and Sophia Woo, who were running for new party Vancouver 1st after being expelled by the NPA in June 2014. Vision and the NPA each had four candidates elected, while the Green Party had one.

Candidate name	Party	Votes	% of votes	Elected
(I) Patti Bacchus	Vision Vancouver	73,551	40.48%	X
Joy Alexander	Vision Vancouver	68,264	37.57%	X
(I) Fraser Ballantyne	Non-Partisan Association	65,659	36.13%	X
(I) Allan Wong	Vision Vancouver	65,342	35.97%	X
(I) Mike Lombardi	Vision Vancouver	61,523	33.86%	X
Penny Noble	Non-Partisan Association	60,964	33.55%	X
Janet Fraser	Green Party of Vancouver	59,218	32.59%	X
Stacy Robertson	Non-Partisan Association	58,314	32.09%	X
Christopher Richardson	Non-Partisan Association	58,081	31.96%	X
(I) Ken Clement	Vision Vancouver	57,826	31.82%	
(I) Cherie Payne	Vision Vancouver	55,652	30.63%	
Sandy Sharma	Non-Partisan Association	54,063	29.75%	
(I) Rob Wynen	Vision Vancouver	52,288	28.78%	
Mischa Oak	Green Party of Vancouver	48,539	26.71%	
Jane Bouey	Public Education Project	41,757	22.99%	
Diana Day	Coalition of Progressive Electors	39,068	21.50%	
Gwen Giesbrecht	Public Education Project	35,064	19.30%	
(I) Sophia Woo	Vancouver 1st	35,011	19.27%	
(I) Ken Denike	Vancouver 1st	31,545	17.36%	
Ilana Shecter	Coalition of Progressive Electors	25,538	14.05%	
Ralph Fraatz	Coalition of Progressive Electors	23,077	12.70%	
Heidi Nagtegaal	Coalition of Progressive Electors	22,126	12.18%	
Nanjalah Kombii	Coalition of Progressive Electors	20,703	11.39%	
Susan Bhatha	Vancouver 1st	16,345	9.00%	
T "Mrs. Doubtfire" Dodds	Independent	9,067	4.99%	
Bang Nguyen	Independent	9,025	4.97%	
Larry Falls	Independent	8,890	4.89%	
Raj Gupta	Independent	8,281	4.56%	
Amin Jivraj	Independent	4,555	2.51%	

=== Capital plan questions ===
The proposed budget for 2015–2018 was $1.085 billion, of which $235 million would be borrowed, requiring electoral approval.

Voters were asked the following three questions:

1. Are you in favour of Council having the authority, without further assent of the electors, to pass bylaws between January 1, 2015, and December 31, 2018, to borrow an aggregate $58,200,000 for the following purposes?

- Parks at $17,950,000
- Recreational and exhibition facilities at $40,250,000

Option	Votes	Percentage
Yes	108,382	66.88%
No	53,692	33.12%
Total votes	162,074	100%

2. Are you in favour of Council having the authority, without further assent of the electors, to pass bylaws between January 1, 2015, and December 31, 2018, to borrow an aggregate $95,700,000 for the following purposes?

- Public safety facilities at $22,250,000
- Street and bridge infrastructure at $56,450,000
- Street lighting, traffic signals, and communications systems at $17,000,000

Option	Votes	Percentage
Yes	128,287	74.42%
No	44,088	25.58%
Total votes	172,375	100%

3. Are you in favour of Council having the authority, without further assent of the electors, to pass bylaws between January 1, 2015, and December 31, 2018, to borrow an aggregate $81,100,000 for the following purposes?

- Community facilities at $59,750,000
- Civic facilities and infrastructure at $21,350,000

Option	Votes	Percentage
Yes	110,378	68.13%
No	51,628	31.87%
Total votes	162,006	100%

== Voter and party statistics ==
=== Voter turnout ===
Of the 411,741 registered voters, there were 181,707 recorded ballots, putting the voter turnout at 44.13%. This was an increase from the 34.57% turnout during the previous municipal election in 2011.

=== Elected percentage by party ===
Party	Mayor		Councillors		Park board commissioners		School board trustees		Total candidates	
Party	# elected	% elected	# elected	% elected	# elected	% elected	# elected	% elected	# elected	% elected
Green Party of Vancouver	NIL	N/A	1/3	33.3%	2/2	100.0%	1/2	50.0%	4/7	57.1%
Non-Partisan Association	0/1	0.0%	3/8	37.5%	4/6	66.7%	4/5	80.0%	11/20	55.0%
Vision Vancouver	1/1	100.0%	6/8	75.0%	1/6	16.7%	4/7	57.1%	12/22	54.5%
Coalition of Progressive Electors	0/1	0.0%	0/8	0.0%	0/5	0.0%	0/5	0.0%	0/19	0.0%
Vancouver 1st	NIL	N/A	0/5	0.0%	0/5	0.0%	0/3	0.0%	0/13	0.0%
Cedar Party	NIL	N/A	0/4	0.0%	NIL	N/A	NIL	N/A	0/4	0.0%
Independent Democratic Electoral Alliance	NIL	N/A	0/1	0.0%	0/1	0.0%	NIL	N/A	0/2	0.0%
Public Education Project	NIL	N/A	NIL	N/A	NIL	N/A	0/2	0.0%	0/2	0.0%
Stop Party	0/1	0.0%	NIL	N/A	NIL	N/A	NIL	N/A	0/1	0.0%
OneCity Vancouver	NIL	N/A	0/1	0.0%	NIL	N/A	NIL	N/A	0/1	0.0%
Hotel Workers United – Local 40	NIL	N/A	0/1	0.0%	NIL	N/A	NIL	N/A	0/1	0.0%
Independent	0/6	0.0%	0/10	0.0%	0/6	0.0%	0/5	0.0%	0/27	0.0%

=== Seat changes by party ===
Party	Mayor & councillors				Park board commissioners				School board trustees				Total elected			
Party	2011	2014	% change	% seats	2011	2014	% change	% seats	2011	2014	% change	% Seats	2011	2014	% change	% seats
Vision Vancouver	8	7	−12.50%	63.64%	5	1	−80.00%	14.29%	5	4	−20.00%	44.44%	18	12	−33.33%	44.44%
Non-Partisan Association	2	3	+50.00%	27.27%	2	4	+100.00%	57.14%	3	4	+33.33%	44.44%	7	11	+57.14%	40.74%
Green Party of Vancouver	1	1	±0.00%	9.09%	0	2	N/A	28.57%	0	1	N/A	11.11%	1	4	+300.00%	14.81%
Coalition of Progressive Electors	0	0	±0.00%	0.00%	0	0	±0.00%	0.00%	1	0	−100.00%	0.00%	1	0	−100.00%	0.00%

== Opinion polls ==
View source data.

Mayoral candidates
Polling firm	Date of polling	Robertson	LaPointe	Wong	Others	Ref.
Insights West	November 12, 2014	46%	41%	9%	4%	
Insights West	November 10, 2014	47%	43%	9%	–	
Justason Market Intelligence	November 3, 2014	46%	32%	16%	–	
