= 2011 Vancouver municipal election =

Canadian local election

- November 19, 2011

11 seats in Vancouver City Council
- Turnout: 35.0% ▲4.2 pp
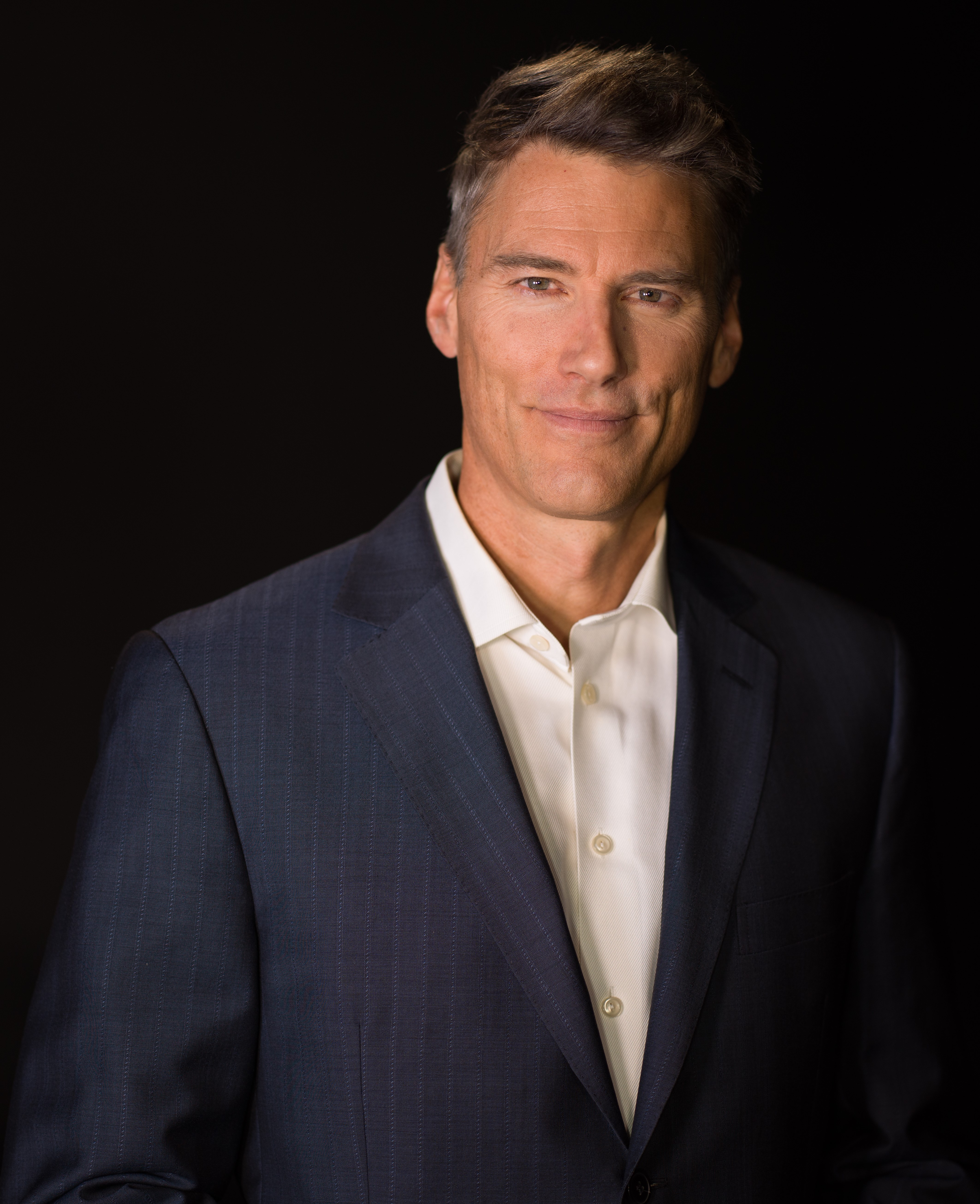

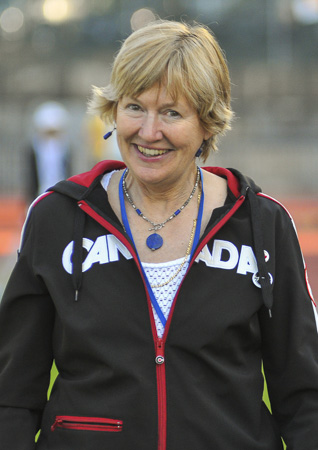

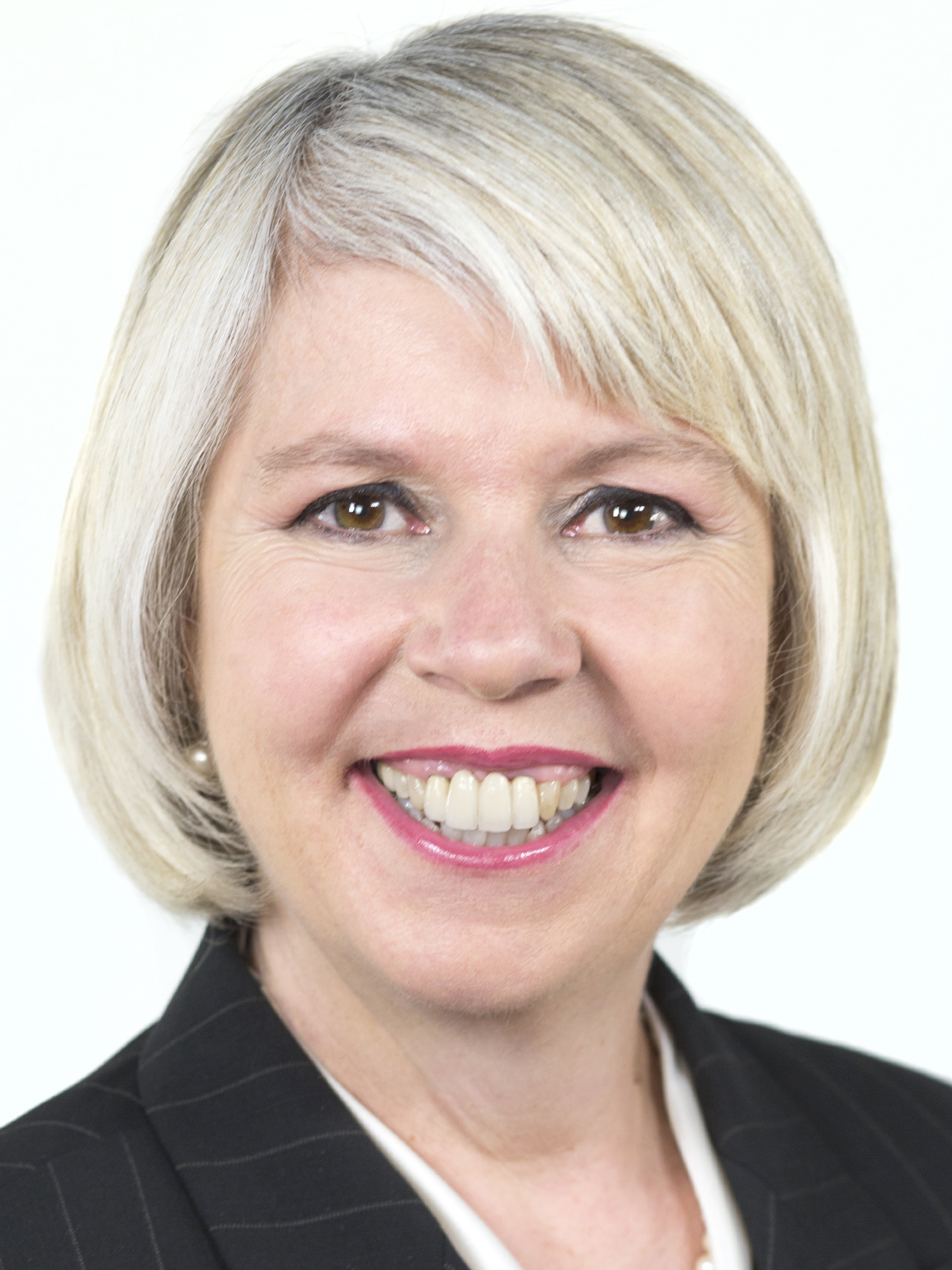

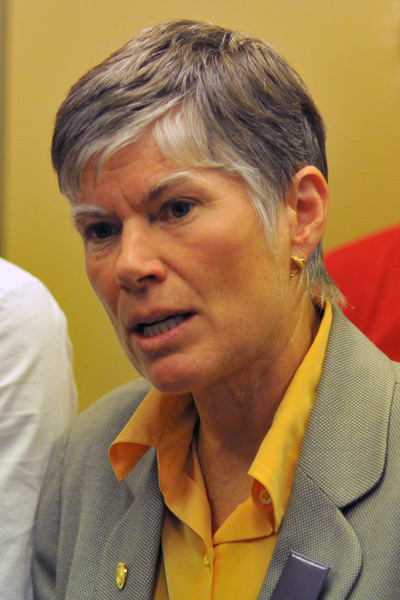
| | First party | Second party | Third party |
|---|---|---|---|
| Leader | Gregor Robertson | Suzanne Anton | Adriane Carr (de facto) |
| Party | Vision | NPA | Green |
| Alliance | Vision-COPE |
| Leader's seat | Mayor | Ran for Mayor (lost) | Councillor |
| Last election | 8 seats, 54.39% | 1 seat, 39.26% | 0 seats, N/A |
| Seats won | 8 | 2 | 1 |
| Seat change | Steady | ▲1 | ▲1 |
| Popular vote | 77,005 | 58,152 | N/A |
| Percentage | 53.17% | 40.15% | N/A |
| Swing | ▼1.21% | ▲0.89% | N/A |
| | Fourth party | Fifth party |
| Leader | Ellen Woodsworth (de facto) | Randy Helten |
| Party | COPE | NSV |
| Alliance | Vision-COPE |
| Leader's seat | Ran for Councillor (lost) | Ran for Mayor (lost) |
| Last election | 2 seats, N/A | N/A |
| Seats won | 0 | 0 |
| Seat change | ▼2 | Steady |
| Popular vote | N/A | 4,077 |
| Percentage | N/A | 2.77% |
| Swing | N/A | N/A |
- Mayoral results by voting division
Mayor before election
Gregor Robertson
Vision
Elected mayor
Gregor Robertson
Vision

The City of Vancouver held a municipal election on November 19, 2011, along with other municipalities and regional districts in British Columbia. All local government elections were for a three-year period. The ballot elected one mayor, 10 councillors, nine school board trustees and seven park board commissioners. A $180 million capital borrowing plan was also put to a vote.

Incumbent mayor Gregor Robertson and the Vision Vancouver Party sought and won their second term in office following their victory in the 2008 election. All Vision Vancouver candidates won seats in their respective categories.

Suzanne Anton lost her bid as mayor but the NPA team gained seats in council, park board and school board. COPE was nearly wiped out this election, losing both seats in city council. Its only elected official was school board trustee incumbent Allan Wong. On December 8, 2013, Wong resigned from the Coalition of Progressive Electors (COPE) and joined Vision as a sitting trustee.

The Green Party of Vancouver had its first elected city councillor with Adriane Carr, but lost its incumbent seat on the park board. New party Neighbourhoods for a Sustainable Vancouver (NSV) did not win any seats in council. NSV leader Randy Helten placed a distant third in the mayoral race.

== Candidates and results ==
The nomination period officially opened on October 4, 2011, and closed on October 14, 2011. This was the second election where Vision Vancouver and COPE signed an electoral agreement to support each other's candidates for election.

(I) denotes incumbents.

=== Mayor ===
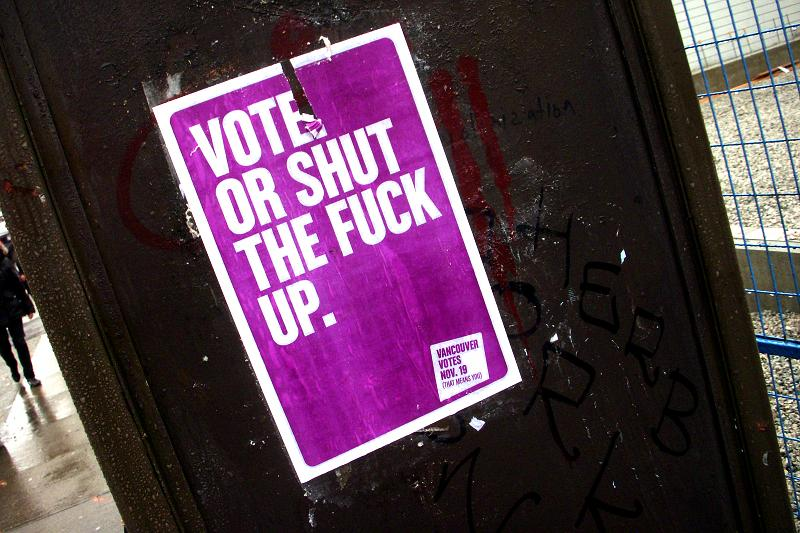
Poster from the 2011 Vancouver municipal elections

Twelve candidates sought election to the position of mayor. Four were affiliated with a political party and eight were independents. Incumbent mayor Gregor Robertson of Vision Vancouver was re-elected.

| Candidate name | Party affiliation | Votes | % of votes | Elected |
|---|---|---|---|---|
| (I) Gregor Robertson | Vision Vancouver | 77,005 | 53.17 | X |
| Suzanne Anton | Non-Partisan Association | 58,152 | 40.15 | |
| Randy Helten | Neighbourhoods for a Sustainable Vancouver | 4,007 | 2.77 | |
| Gerry McGuire | Vancouver Citizen's Voice | 1,195 | 0.83 | |
| Sam Pelletier | Independent | 443 | 0.31 | |
| Darrell Zimmerman | Independent | 426 | 0.29 | |
| Dubgee | Independent | 419 | 0.29 | |
| Robin Lawrance | Independent | 353 | 0.24 | |
| Victor B. Paquette | Independent | 333 | 0.23 | |
| Lloyd Alan Cooke | Independent | 310 | 0.21 | |
| Menard Caissy | Independent | 288 | 0.20 | |
| Gölök Zoltán Buday | Independent | 268 | 0.19 | |

=== City councillors ===
Ten councillors were elected out of 41 candidates. Of the candidates, 28 were affiliated with a political party, and 13 were independent. Seven incumbent councillors sought re-election: six from Vision Vancouver and one from COPE. Of those subsequently elected, Vision Vancouver held seven seats, the NPA two and the Green Party of Vancouver one.

| Candidate name | Party affiliation | Votes | % of votes | Elected |
|---|---|---|---|---|
| (I) Raymond Louie | Vision Vancouver | 63,273 | 43.69 | X |
| (I) Kerry Jang | Vision Vancouver | 61,931 | 42.76 | X |
| (I) Heather Deal | Vision Vancouver | 61,368 | 42.37 | X |
| (I) Andrea Reimer | Vision Vancouver | 60,593 | 41.84 | X |
| (I) Tim Stevenson | Vision Vancouver | 56,638 | 39.11 | X |
| (I) Geoff Meggs | Vision Vancouver | 56,184 | 38.79 | X |
| Tony Tang | Vision Vancouver | 53,873 | 37.20 | X |
| Elizabeth Ball | Non-Partisan Association | 51,607 | 35.63 | X |
| George Affleck | Non-Partisan Association | 51,145 | 35.32 | X |
| Adriane Carr | Green Party of Vancouver | 48,648 | 33.59 | X |
| (I) Ellen Woodsworth | Coalition of Progressive Electors | 48,557 | 33.53 | |
| Bill Yuen | Non-Partisan Association | 48,407 | 33.42 | |
| Mike Klassen | Non-Partisan Association | 47,868 | 33.05 | |
| Ken Charko | Non-Partisan Association | 45,373 | 31.33 | |
| Bill McCreery | Non-Partisan Association | 45,114 | 31.15 | |
| Francis Wong | Non-Partisan Association | 44,707 | 30.87 | |
| Tim Louis | Coalition of Progressive Electors | 43,926 | 30.33 | |
| Sean Bickerton | Non-Partisan Association | 43,289 | 29.89 | |
| Joe Carangi | Non-Partisan Association | 41,460 | 28.63 | |
| RJ Aquino | Coalition of Progressive Electors | 39,054 | 26.97 | |
| Jason Lamarche | Non-Partisan Association | 37,286 | 25.75 | |
| Sandy Garossino | Independent | 20,866 | 14.41 | |
| Elizabeth Murphy | Neighbourhoods for a Sustainable Vancouver | 19,644 | 13.56 | |
| Nicole Benson | Neighbourhoods for a Sustainable Vancouver | 17,983 | 12.42 | |
| Terry Martin | Neighbourhoods for a Sustainable Vancouver | 13,025 | 8.99 | |
| Marie Kerchum | Neighbourhoods for a Sustainable Vancouver | 12,614 | 8.71 | |
| Chris Shaw | De-Growth Vancouver | 8,219 | 5.68 | |
| Ian Gregson | De-Growth Vancouver | 7,872 | 5.44 | |
| Amy Fox | Independent | 6,499 | 4.49 | |
| Kelly Alm | Independent | 5,525 | 3.82 | |
| Grant Fraser | Independent | 4,758 | 3.29 | |
| Chris Masson | De-Growth Vancouver | 4,690 | 3.24 | |
| Lauren R.I.C.H. Gill | Independent | 4,682 | 3.23 | |
| Michael Singh Dharni | Independent | 4,167 | 2.88 | |
| Marc Tan Nguyen | Independent | 4,118 | 2.84 | |
| Rick Orser | Independent | 3,996 | 2.76 | |
| Wendythirteen | Independent | 3,926 | 2.71 | |
| Bang Nguyen | Independent | 3,826 | 2.64 | |
| Cord (Ted) Copeland | Independent | 3,587 | 2.48 | |
| Aaron R.I.C.H. Spires | Independent | 2,200 | 1.52 | |
| R H Maxwell N Bur | Independent | 1,955 | 1.35 | |

=== Park board commissioners ===
Seven commissioners were elected out of 21 candidates. Of the candidates, 15 were affiliated with a political party, and six were independent. Four incumbent commissioners sought re-election: three from Vision Vancouver and one from the Green Party of Vancouver. Of the elected commissioners, Vision held five seats and the NPA two.

| Candidate name | Party affiliation | Votes | % of votes | Elected |
|---|---|---|---|---|
| (I) Constance Barnes | Vision Vancouver | 63,952 | 44.16 | X |
| (I) Sarah Blyth | Vision Vancouver | 62,198 | 42.95 | X |
| (I) Aaron Jasper | Vision Vancouver | 58,343 | 40.29 | X |
| Niki Sharma | Vision Vancouver | 58,330 | 40.28 | X |
| Melissa De Genova | Non-Partisan Association | 56,501 | 39.01 | X |
| John Coupar | Non-Partisan Association | 50,375 | 34.78 | X |
| Trevor Loke | Vision Vancouver | 49,878 | 34.44 | X |
| Casey Crawford | Non-Partisan Association | 49,020 | 33.85 | |
| Gabby Kalaw | Non-Partisan Association | 48,600 | 33.56 | |
| Jason Upton | Non-Partisan Association | 46,261 | 31.94 | |
| Dave Pasin | Non-Partisan Association | 46,005 | 31.77 | |
| (I) Stuart Mackinnon | Green Party of Vancouver | 44,761 | 30.91 | |
| Brent Granby | Coalition of Progressive Electors | 42,769 | 29.53 | |
| Donalda Greenwell-Baker | Coalition of Progressive Electors | 39,033 | 26.95 | |
| Jamie Lee Hamilton | Independent Democratic Electoral Alliance | 19,495 | 13.46 | |
| Juliet Victoria Andalis | Independent | 12,693 | 8.76 | |
| Eleanor Hadley | Independent | 10,754 | 9.37 | |
| Andrew Murray | Independent | 9,819 | 6.78 | |
| Tammy Truong | Independent | 8,917 | 6.16 | |
| Peter Raymond Haskell | Independent | 5,540 | 3.83 | |
| Freyja Pri Toor | Independent | 5,062 | 3.50 | |

=== School board trustees ===
Nine school board trustees were elected out of 20 candidates. Of the candidates, 15 were affiliated with a political party, and five were independent. Seven incumbent trustees were seeking re-election: three from Vision Vancouver, three from COPE, and one from the NPA. Of the elected trustees, five were from Vision Vancouver, three from the NPA and one from COPE.

| Candidate name | Party affiliation | Votes | % of votes | Elected |
|---|---|---|---|---|
| (I) Patti Bacchus | Vision Vancouver | 72,025 | 49.73 | X |
| (I) Mike Lombardi | Vision Vancouver | 65,411 | 45.17 | X |
| (I) Ken Clement | Vision Vancouver | 61,994 | 42.81 | X |
| Cherie Payne | Vision Vancouver | 61,874 | 42.72 | X |
| (I) Ken Denike | Non-Partisan Association | 59,310 | 40.95 | X |
| (I) Allan Wong | Coalition of Progressive Electors | 57,902 | 39.98 | X |
| Rob Wynen | Vision Vancouver | 56,763 | 39.19 | X |
| Sophia Woo | Non-Partisan Association | 55,890 | 38.59 | X |
| Fraser Ballantyne | Non-Partisan Association | 55,713 | 38.47 | X |
| Stacy Robertson | Non-Partisan Association | 54,275 | 37.48 | |
| Gwen Giesbrecht | Coalition of Progressive Electors | 52,470 | 36.23 | |
| (I) Jane Bouey | Coalition of Progressive Electors | 52,026 | 35.92 | |
| (I) Al Blakey | Coalition of Progressive Electors | 51,963 | 35.88 | |
| Sandy Sharma | Non-Partisan Association | 49,843 | 34.42 | |
| Louise Boutin | Green Party of Vancouver | 34,477 | 23.81 | |
| Lily Harvey | Independent | 20,314 | 14.03 | |
| Misha Lauenstein | Independent | 14,297 | 9.87 | |
| Robert Allan Stark | Independent | 13,391 | 9.25 | |
| Bang Nguyen | Independent | 12,903 | 8.91 | |
| Peter Raymond Haskell | Independent | 11,915 | 8.23 | |

=== Capital Plan questions ===
1. Are you in favour of council having the authority, without further assent of the electors, to pass by-laws between January 1, 2012, and December 31, 2014, to borrow an aggregate $65,800,000 for the following purposes?

- Community Facilities at $58,600,000
- Parks at $7,200,000

| Option | Votes | Percentage |
|---|---|---|
| Yes | 81,605 | 63.39 |
| No | 47,124 | 36.61 |
| Total votes | 128,729 | 100 |

2. Are you in favour of council having the authority, without further assent of the electors, to pass by-laws between January 1, 2012, and December 31, 2014, to borrow an aggregate $66,300,000 for the following purposes?

- Street and Bridge Infrastructure at $41,150,000
- Transit and Safety Improvements at $8,500,000
- Street Lighting, Traffic Signals and Communications Systems at $16,650,000

| Option | Votes | Percentage |
|---|---|---|
| Yes | 88,640 | 68.85 |
| No | 40,095 | 31.15 |
| Total votes | 128,735 | 100 |

3. Are you in favour of council having the authority, without further assent of the electors, to pass by-laws between January 1, 2012, and December 31, 2014, to borrow an aggregate $47,700,000 for the following purposes?

- Public Safety Facilities at $13,200,000
- Civic Facilities at $34,500,000

| Option | Votes | Percentage |
|---|---|---|
| Yes | 87,515 | 68.23 |
| No | 40,740 | 31.76 |
| Total votes | 128,255 | 100 |

== Voter and party statistics ==
=== Voter turnout ===
Of the 418,878 registered voters, there were 144,823 recorded ballots, marking the voter turnout at 34.57 percent. This is an increase from the 30.79-percent turnout during the previous municipal election in 2008.

=== Elected percentage by party ===
Of the parties represented, only Vision Vancouver had its entire slate of candidates elected in all fields.

| Party | Mayor | | Councillors | | Park board commissioners | | School board trustees | | Total candidates | |
|---|---|---|---|---|---|---|---|---|---|---|
| Party | # Elected | % Elected | # Elected | % Elected | # Elected | % Elected | # Elected | % Elected | # Elected | % Elected |
| Vision Vancouver | 1/1 | 100.0 | 7/7 | 100.0 | 5/5 | 100.0 | 5/5 | 100.0 | 18/18 | 100.0 |
| Green Party of Vancouver | NIL | N/A | 1/1 | 100.0 | 0/1 | 0.0 | 0/1 | 0.0 | 1/3 | 33.3 |
| Non-Partisan Association | 0/1 | 0.0 | 2/10 | 20.0 | 2/6 | 33.3 | 3/5 | 60.0 | 7/22 | 31.8 |
| Coalition of Progressive Electors | NIL | N/A | 0/3 | 0.0 | 0/2 | 0.0 | 1/4 | 25.0 | 1/9 | 11.1 |
| Neighbourhoods for a Sustainable Vancouver | 0/1 | 0.0 | 0/4 | 0.0 | NIL | N/A | NIL | N/A | 0/5 | 0.0 |
| De-Growth Vancouver | NIL | N/A | 0/3 | 0.0 | NIL | N/A | NIL | N/A | 0/3 | 0.0 |
| Vancouver Citizen's Voice | 0/1 | 0.0 | NIL | N/A | NIL | N/A | NIL | N/A | 0/1 | 0.0 |
| Independent Democratic Electoral Alliance | NIL | N/A | NIL | N/A | 0/1 | 0.0 | NIL | N/A | 0/1 | 0.0 |
| Independent candidates | 0/8 | 0.0 | 0/13 | 0.0 | 0/6 | 0.0 | 0/5 | 0.0 | 0/32 | 0.0 |

=== Seat changes by party ===
| Party | Mayor & councillors | | | | Park board commissioners | | | | School board trustees | | | | Total elected | | | |
|---|---|---|---|---|---|---|---|---|---|---|---|---|---|---|---|---|
| Party | 2008 | 2011 | % Change | % Seats | 2008 | 2011 | % Change | % Seats | 2008 | 2011 | % Change | % Seats | 2008 | 2011 | % Change | % Seats |
| Vision Vancouver | 8 | 8 | 0.00 | 72.73 | 4 | 5 | +25.00 | 71.43 | 4 | 5 | +25.00 | 55.56 | 16 | 18 | +12.50 | 66.67 |
| Non-Partisan Association | 1 | 2 | +100.00 | 18.18 | 1 | 2 | +100.00 | 28.57 | 2 | 3 | +50.00 | 33.33 | 4 | 7 | +75.00 | 25.93 |
| Green Party of Vancouver | 0 | 1 | N/A | 9.09 | 1 | 0 | −100.00 | 0.00 | 0 | 0 | 0.00 | 0.00 | 1 | 1 | 0.00 | 3.70 |
| Coalition of Progressive Electors | 2 | 0 | −100.00 | 0.00 | 1 | 0 | −100.00 | 0.00 | 3 | 1 | −66.67 | 11.11 | 6 | 1 | −83.33 | 3.70 |
