= Neighbourhoods for a Sustainable Vancouver =

Municipal political party in Canada

- Inactive municipal party
- Leader: Steering Committee
- Founded: 2007
- Dissolved: 2021
- Ideology: Sustainable development
- Political position: Centre
- Colours: Light green

Neighbourhoods for a Sustainable Vancouver (NSV) was a centrist municipal political party in Vancouver, British Columbia, Canada promoting sustainable development. It was consensus-based, run by a steering committee rather than having an individual as leader.

== History ==
NSV was formed as an advocacy group in 2007, similar to a previous coalition called Neighbour 2 Neighbour. NSV brought together diverse neighbourhoods that span the political spectrum into a network to communicate with each other and to issue joint position statements or advocacy.

The first NSV public representative and media contact was Mel Lehan from West Kitsilano. After the fall of 2008, Ned Jacobs of Riley Park/South Cambie (son of urbanist Jane Jacobs) assumed that role.

NSV coordinated input from the large network of neighbourhoods that produced common position letters to Council, with some of the early letters having up to 39 versions before finalizing based on consensus.

In the November 2008 Vancouver civic election the Non Partisan Association-dominated (NPA) council was defeated. Furor over and opposition to EcoDensity policies contributed to the political demise of NPA Mayor Sam Sullivan and his party. NSV created a candidate survey that lead to the network's endorsement of the Vision/COPE slate. Although Vision Vancouver were elected on a promise to reconsider EcoDensity, the new 2008 Vision Vancouver council continued to implement the NPA policies. Vision Vancouver's Greenest City Action Plan includes many actions proposed under EcoDensity policies.

== 2011 civic election ==
Disappointed with Vision Vancouver and NPA policy directions, and COPE entering into an alliance with Vision that restricted COPE to three council candidates, NSV evolved from an advocacy group to an electoral organization in 2011. The effects of developer contributions to election funding of the two main parties, Vision Vancouver and the NPA, continued to be a concern.

NSV ran five candidates in the Vancouver 2011 municipal election and also endorsed six candidates from various parties to complete a slate for Mayor and Council.

NSV ran a candidate for mayor (Randy Helten), and four city council candidates (Nicole Benson, Marie Kerchum, Terry Martin, and Elizabeth Murphy). The party also endorsed six additional candidates from outside the party for council: RJ Aquino (COPE), Adriane Carr (Green), Sandy Garossino (independent), Tim Louis (COPE), Bill McCreery (NPA), and Ellen Woodsworth (COPE).

In the 2011 election Randy Helten came in third out of twelve candidates for mayor, behind Gregor Robertson (Vision Vancouver) and Suzanne Anton (NPA). The five-week low-budget campaign by the five NSV candidates resulted in 67,271 votes, with Elizabeth Murphy garnering 19,644 votes, compared to the top-ranking council candidate (Vision Vancouver's Raymond Louie, at 63,273 votes).

Of the other candidates NSV endorsed, Adriane Carr (Green Party of Vancouver) was elected as councillor.

A major issue for NSV during the election was campaign finance reform. NSV emphasized that regulators should never be funded by those they regulate. Thus, since municipal governments are the regulator of land use policy, civic council candidates should not be funded by developers. Yet the development industry is the largest source of funds for both the NPA and Vision Vancouver.

According to Campaign Financing Disclosure Statements on the City of Vancouver website, Campaign spending in the 2011 civic election were as follows (total rounded with dollars per vote):

- Vision Vancouver $2.237 million ($5.41/vote)
- NPA $2.978 million ($7.03/vote)
- COPE $361,000 ($2.74/vote)
- NSV $40,000 ($0.64/vote)
- Green $23,000 ($0.46/vote)

== See also ==
- Consensus decision-making
