= Vancouver-Hastings =

Provincial electoral district in British Columbia, Canada

British Columbia electoral district
- Location in Vancouver

Provincial electoral district
- Legislature: Legislative Assembly of British Columbia
MLA
Niki Sharma
New Democratic
- First contested: 1991
- Last contested: 2026

Demographics
- Population (2001): 56,683
- Area (km²): 12.3
- Pop. density (per km²): 4,608.4
- Census division: Metro Vancouver
- Census subdivision: Vancouver

Vancouver-Hastings is a provincial electoral district for the Legislative Assembly of British Columbia, Canada.

== Members of the Legislative Assembly ==
Its MLA is Niki Sharma. She was first elected in 2020. She represents the British Columbia New Democratic Party.

This riding has elected the following members of the Legislative Assembly:

Vancouver-Hastings
Assembly	Years	Member	Party
35th	1991–1996	Joy MacPhail	New Democratic
36th	1996–2001	Joy MacPhail	New Democratic
37th	2001–2005	Joy MacPhail	New Democratic
38th	2005–2009	Shane Simpson	New Democratic
39th	2009–2013	Shane Simpson	New Democratic
40th	2013–2017	Shane Simpson	New Democratic
41st	2017–2020	Shane Simpson	New Democratic
42nd	2020–2024	Niki Sharma	New Democratic
43rd	2024–2026	Niki Sharma	New Democratic
44th	2026–present	Niki Sharma	New Democratic

== Election results ==
Graph of provincial election results in Vancouver-Hastings (minor parties that never got 2% of the vote or didn't run consistently are omitted)

2026 British Columbia general election
** Preliminary results — Not yet official **
Party	Candidate	Votes	%	±%
New Democratic	Niki Sharma	9,707	51.28	-12.87
Conservative	Phyllis Tang	4,795	25.33	+1.04
Green	Kyra Philbert	3,576	18.89	+8.04
CentreBC	Christian Bosio	463	2.45	
Libertarian	Phil Webb	221	1.17	
Communist	Kimball Cariou	167	0.88	
Total valid votes		18,929	99.77	
Total rejected ballots		44	0.23	-0.00
Turnout		18,973		
Registered voters				
Source: Elections BC
New Democratic hold		Swing		–6.95

2024 British Columbia general election
Party	Candidate	Votes	%	±%	Expenditures
New Democratic	Niki Sharma	14,237	64.1%	+3.54	
Conservative	Jacob Burdge	5,391	24.3%		
Green	Bridget Burns	2,409	10.9%	-8.64	
Independent	Zsolt Kiss	157	0.7%		
Total valid votes		22,194	–		
Total rejected ballots					
Turnout					
Registered voters					
Source: Elections BC

2020 British Columbia general election
Party	Candidate	Votes	%	±%	Expenditures
New Democratic	Niki Sharma	13,362	60.56	+0.58	$23,640.61
Green	Bridget Burns	4,312	19.54	+1.87	$3,816.71
Liberal	Alex Read	3,885	17.61	−3.88	$4,639.54
Libertarian	Gölök Z Buday	321	1.45	–	$550.68
Communist	Kimball Cariou	184	0.83	−0.03	$123.40
Total valid votes		22,064	100.00	–	
Total rejected ballots		192	0.86	+0.08	
Turnout		22,256	51.37	−8.22	
Registered voters		43,322			
New Democratic hold		Swing		−0.65	
Source: Elections BC

2017 British Columbia general election
Party	Candidate	Votes	%	±%	Expenditures
New Democratic	Shane Simpson	14,382	59.98	+0.41	$38,308
Liberal	Jane Spitz	5,152	21.49	-6.15	$24,876
Green	David H.T. Wong	4,238	17.67	+6.56	$3,621
Communist	Kimball Mark Cariou	206	0.86	–	$0
Total valid votes		23,978	100.00	–	
Total rejected ballots		188	0.78	-0.17	
Turnout		24,166	59.59	+6.38	
Registered voters		40,555			
Source: Elections BC

2013 British Columbia general election
Party	Candidate	Votes	%
New Democratic	Shane Simpson	12,782	59.51
Liberal	Fatima Siddiqui	5,936	27.64
Green	Brennan Wauters	2,386	11.11
Social Credit	Carrol B. Woolsey	374	1.74
Total valid votes		21,478	100.00
Total rejected ballots		206	0.95
Turnout		21684	53.21
Source: Elections BC

2009 British Columbia general election
Party	Candidate	Votes	%	Expenditures
New Democratic	Shane Simpson	10,857	55.45	$66,781
Liberal	Haida Lane	6,323	32.35	$42,119
Green	Ryan Daniel Conroy	2,012	10.29	$4,137
Work Less	Chris Telford	198	1.01	$250
Sex	Dietrich Pajonk	99	0.51	$268
People's Front	Donna Petersen	76	0.38	$250
Total valid votes		19,565	100	
Total rejected ballots		163	0.83	
Turnout		19,728	50.58	
Eligible voters		39,006		

B.C. General Election 2005: Vancouver-Hastings
Party	Candidate	Votes	%	±	Expenditures
NDP	Shane Simpson	11,726	54.61%		$59,320
Liberal	Laura McDiarmid	6,910	32.18%	–	$64,886
Green	Ian Gregson	1,928	8.98%	–	$1,476
Social Credit	Carrol Barbara Woolsey	274	1.28%	–	$1,900
Work Less	Denise Brennan	247	1.15%	–	$565
Marijuana	Stephen Payne	188	0.88%		$100
Independent	Will Offley	130	0.61%		$6,503
Platinum	Catherine Millard Saadi	68	0.32%	–	$100
Total Valid Votes		21,471	100%		
Total Rejected Ballots		205	0.95%		
Turnout		21,676	55.43%		

2001 British Columbia general election
Party	Candidate	Votes	%	Expenditures
New Democratic	Joy MacPhail	8,009	41.64	$44,787
Liberal	Daniel Lee	7,600	39.51	$44,695
Green	Ian Gregson	2,874	14.94	$1,764
Marijuana	Davin Ouimet	409	2.13	$394
Social Credit	Carrol Barbara Woolsey	222	1.15	$1,584
People's Front	Charles Boylan	119	0.63	$97
Total valid votes		19,233		
Total rejected ballots		134	0.70	
Turnout		19,367	68.11	

B.C. General Election 1996: Vancouver-Hastings
Party	Candidate	Votes	%	±	Expenditures
NDP	Joy MacPhail	9,894	54.01%		$48,308
Liberal	Raymond Leung	6,345	34.64%	–	$44,576
Progressive Democrat	Joe Cafariello	824	4.50%	–	$706
Reform	Nazario Matino	568	3.10%	–	$2,370
Green	Irene L. Schmidt	486	2.65%	–	$154
Social Credit	Carrol Barbara Woolsey	137	0.75%	–	$2,470
Natural Law	Christian Prekratic	64	0.35%		$134
Total valid votes		18,318	100.00%		
Total rejected ballots		209	1.13%		
Turnout		18,527	67.96%		

B.C. General Election 1991: Vancouver-Hastings
Party	Candidate	Votes	%	±	Expenditures
NDP	Joy MacPhail	10,087	55.93%		$50,916
Liberal	Nancy Lau	5,092	28.23%	–	$8,833
Social Credit	Don L. Gedlaman	2,589	14.35%	–	$16,148
Green	Kim Anda Jarzebiak	268	1.49%	–	$89
Total valid votes		18,036	100.00%		
Total rejected ballots		644	3.45%		
Turnout		18,680	70.84%		

== See also ==
- List of British Columbia provincial electoral districts
- Canadian provincial electoral districts
