= Kirk LaPointe =

Canadian journalist and politician

His Worship Kirk LaPointe

Mayor of West Vancouver
- Assuming office 2026
- Succeeding: Mark Sager

Personal details
- Born: December 12, 1957 (age 68) Toronto, Ontario, Canada
- Party: Independent
- Other political affiliations: Non-Partisan Association (2014)
- Education: Ryerson Polytechnical Institute
- Profession: Journalist

Kirk LaPointe (born December 12, 1957) is a Canadian journalist and politician who is the mayor of West Vancouver, British Columbia.

== Early life ==
LaPointe was born in Toronto, where he was raised by a single mother in what he describes as poverty conditions. He was educated at New Toronto Secondary School and Ryerson Polytechnical Institute, later known as Ryerson University, where he earned a bachelor's degree in journalism. In his teens and early 20s, he hosted It's Up To You, a community channel program on Maclean-Hunter Cable Television about music. At Ryerson, he was station manager at campus station CKLN-FM and entertainment editor at The Eyeopener newspaper.

== Career ==
He started at The Canadian Press as a general assignment reporter in its Toronto bureau in 1980, then moved to Ottawa in 1981, where he held roles as a parliamentary reporter, a beat specialist in communications and transportation, and a columnist on fitness. He moved back to Toronto in 1984 as CP's reporter on broadcasting, then moved into management in 1986 as lifestyles editor. He returned to Ottawa in 1987 as the bureau's news editor, then was recruited in 1989 to the Canadian Broadcasting Corporation as a host on CBC Newsworld at its launch. He returned to CP in 1991 as the Ottawa bureau chief and continued as a weekly CBC Newsworld host, holding both roles until 1995. He commuted to Toronto as the CP General News editor in Toronto in 1995, then left CP to join Southam News in Ottawa as its editor-in-chief and general manager.

He was recruited by Southam to move to Hamilton as editor-in-chief of the Hamilton Spectator from 1997 until 1998. While at the Spectator, he helped prototype a national newspaper that would later become the National Post, and was hired as its founding executive editor. He then returned to the Spectator in 1999 to serve as editor and associate publisher.

He was recruited in 2010 to be an ombudsman for the Canadian Broadcasting Corporation. He was subsequently executive director of the Organization of News Ombudsmen. He became Publisher and Editor-in-Chief of Self-Counsel Press, a financial and legal self-help publisher, in 2013, then in 2015 joined a start-up FM station in Vancouver, Roundhouse Radio, as its morning host, then an evening host. The station discontinued in 2017. When the station launched, he also joined Glacier Media as the VP of Audience and Business Development at Business in Vancouver. He then became its Editor-in-Chief and Glacier's VP Editorial in 2018, then Publisher and Editor-in-Chief in 2020. In 2023, he became its Executive Editor, then left the company briefly in late 2023 before returning as Glacier Media's columnist in March 2024. He is also the B.C. correspondent for The Hub, a national commentary site.

LaPointe has been an adjunct professor and executive-in-residence at the University of British Columbia Graduate School of Journalism since 2004. He has taught research methods, ethics and leadership, and most recently media law. He has writtenweekly for Lodestar Media (formerly known as Glacier Media) on politics and business, but stepped down from writing for the company to run for Mayor of West Vancouver in 2026. He continued to write for The Hub as its B.C. correspondent and to host a weekly podcast on business, politics and the economy, SMB Report with Kirk LaPointe.

== Political career ==
=== 2014 Vancouver mayoral campaign ===
In July 2014, he was chosen by the Non-Partisan Association, a municipal political party in Vancouver, to be the party's nominee for Mayor of Vancouver in the November 15, 2014 municipal election. LaPointe received 40% of the vote (73,443 votes), coming in second behind incumbent mayor Gregor Robertson who received 46%.

On election night following his defeat, LaPointe thought he might put politics "in the rearview mirror. He added: "I recognize it comes with a physical, emotional toll, and I'm not sure I want to experience that any time soon." In November 2017, he was quoted as saying he was exploring another run for the mayoralty. He later determined not to run.

=== Mayor of West Vancouver (2026–present) ===
LaPointe ran for mayor of West Vancouver in the 2026 British Columbia municipal elections. He was elected mayor in October, defeating incumbent Mark Sager.

== Electoral record ==
2014 Vancouver municipal election: Mayor
| Party | Candidate | Votes | % | Elected |
|---|---|---|---|---|
| Vision | Gregor Robertson | 83,529 | 45.97 | ✓ |
| NPA | Kirk LaPointe | 73,443 | 40.42 | |
| COPE | Meena Wong | 16,791 | 9.24 | |
| Independent | Bob Kasting | 1,682 | 0.93 | |
| Independent | Mike Hansen | 714 | 0.39 | |
| Independent | Jeff Hill | 611 | 0.34 | |
| Independent | Tim Ly | 556 | 0.31 | |
| Stop Party | Meynard Aubichon | 508 | 0.28 | |
| Independent | Cherryse Kaur Kaiser | 492 | 0.27 | |
| Independent | Colin Shandler | 459 | 0.25 | |
| Total valid votes | | 178, 786 | 100.00 | |
| Vision hold | | Swing | | –7.20 |
