= Shane Simpson =

Canadian politician

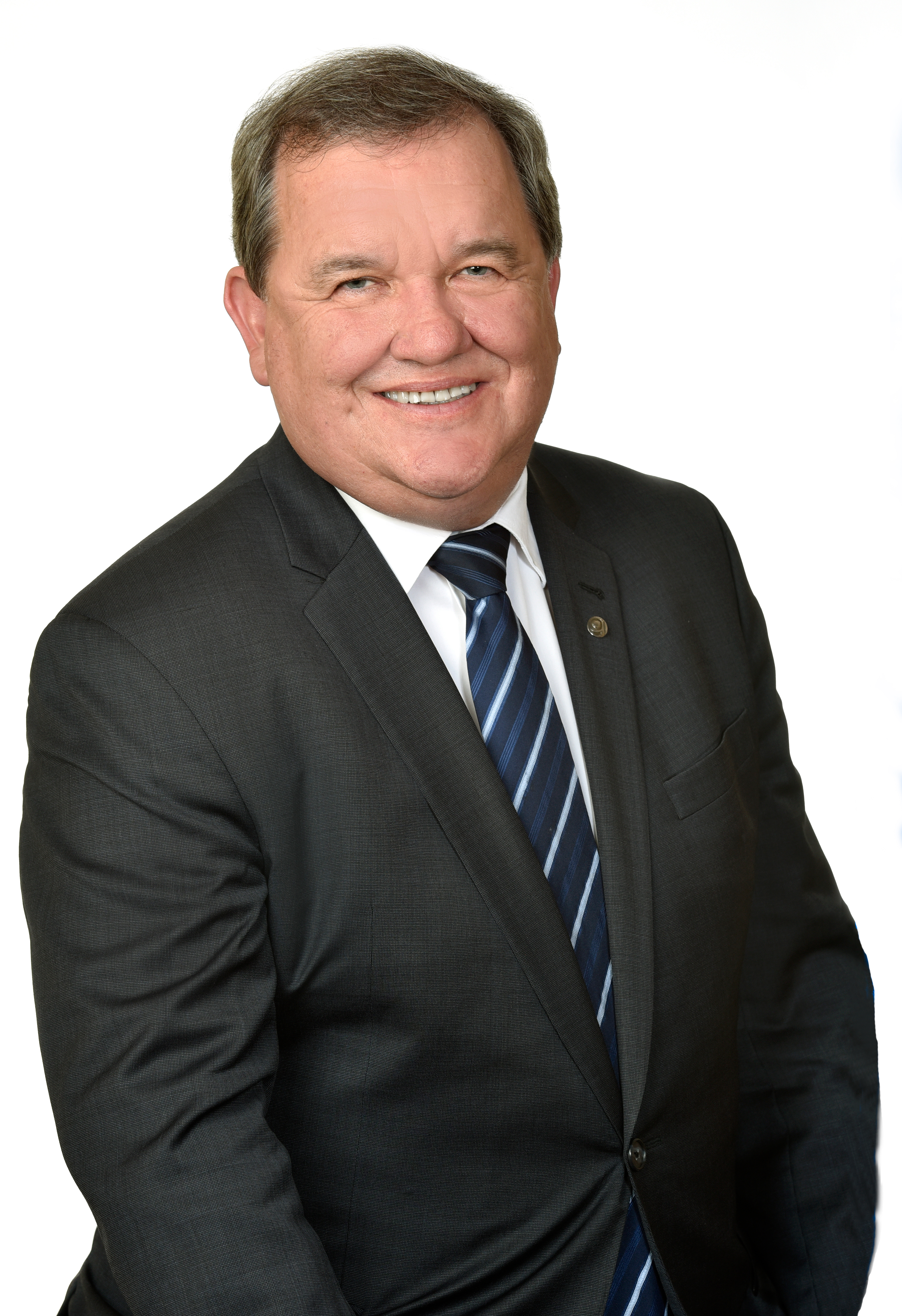

Minister of Social Development and Poverty Reduction of British Columbia
- In office July 18, 2017 – November 26, 2020
- Premier: John Horgan
- Preceded by: Michelle Stilwell
- Succeeded by: Nicholas Simons

Member of the British Columbia Legislative Assembly for Vancouver-Hastings
- In office May 17, 2005 – October 24, 2020
- Preceded by: Joy MacPhail
- Succeeded by: Niki Sharma

Personal details
- Born: 1954 or 1955 (age 71–72) Vancouver, British Columbia
- Party: New Democrat

Shane Lee Simpson (born 1954 or 1955) is a Canadian politician, who served as MLA for Vancouver-Hastings in the Canadian province of British Columbia from 2005 to 2020. He was first elected to the Legislative Assembly in the 2005 election.

He is a member of the British Columbia New Democratic Party and served as the official opposition critic for the environment from 2005 to 2009. He served as critic for Housing, ICBC, the BC Lottery Corporation and the BC Liquor Distribution Branch from 2009 until 2012. In addition Simpson was the NDP Caucus Chair.

== Early life and career ==
Born and raised in East Vancouver, Shane Simpson has been active in his community for over 30 years. He led the fight to stop Lafarge from building a concrete batch plant beside New Brighton Park, a popular and historically significant park facing Burrard Inlet.

In his professional career, Simpson has worked as the Director of Policy and Communications for Smart Growth BC, Chair of the Vancouver City Planning Commission, Instructor in the Community Economic Development program at Simon Fraser University, Executive Director of the Worker Ownership Resource Center, Legislative Coordinator for the Canadian Union of Public Employees, coordinator and fundraiser for the Ray Cam Cooperative Center, executive assistant to former Vancouver East MP Margaret Mitchell, and as a self-employed consultant on business and economic development for labour, co-operative and non-profit groups.

Simpson was the recipient of the Queen's Golden Jubilee Medal for his contribution to community in 2002. In 1992, he was awarded the Governor General's 125th Anniversary Commemorative Medal for Community Service.

He lives in East Vancouver with his wife and daughter.

== Politics ==
He was first elected to the Legislative Assembly in the 2005 British Columbia general election. He was re-elected in 2009, 2013, and 2017.

On September 4, 2020, Simpson announced that he wouldn't run for re-election in the next general election.

== Election results ==
2017 British Columbia general election: Vancouver-Hastings
Party	Candidate	Votes	%	±%	Expenditures
New Democratic	Shane Simpson	14,382	59.98	+0.41	$38,308
Liberal	Jane Spitz	5,152	21.49	-6.15	$24,876
Green	David H.T. Wong	4,238	17.67	+6.56	$3,621
Communist	Kimball Mark Cariou	206	0.86	–	$0
Total valid votes		23,978	100.00	–	
Total rejected ballots		188	0.78	-0.17	
Turnout		24,166	59.59	+6.38	
Registered voters		40,555			
Source: Elections BC

2013 British Columbia general election: Vancouver-Hastings
Party	Candidate	Votes	%
New Democratic	Shane Simpson	12,782	59.51
Liberal	Fatima Siddiqui	5,936	27.64
Green	Brennan Wauters	2,386	11.11
Social Credit	Carrol B. Woolsey	374	1.74
Total valid votes		21,478	100.00
Total rejected ballots		206	0.95
Turnout		21684	53.21
Source: Elections BC

2009 British Columbia general election: Vancouver-Hastings
Party	Candidate	Votes	%	Expenditures
New Democratic	Shane Simpson	10,857	55.45	$66,781
Liberal	Haida Lane	6,323	32.35	$42,119
Green	Ryan Daniel Conroy	2,012	10.29	$4,137
Work Less	Chris Telford	198	1.01	$250
Sex	Dietrich Pajonk	99	0.51	$268
People's Front	Donna Petersen	76	0.38	$250
Total valid votes		19,565	100	
Total rejected ballots		163	0.83	
Turnout		19,728	50.58	
Eligible voters		39,006		

British Columbia provincial government of John Horgan
Cabinet post (1)
Predecessor	Office	Successor
Michelle Stilwell	Minister of Social Development and Poverty Reduction; July 18, 2017 – November 26, 2020	Nicholas Simons
