= Homeless Emergency Action Team =

The Homeless Emergency Action Team (HEAT) was announced on December 9, 2008 by Vancouver Mayor Gregor Robertson to assist Vancouver's homeless citizens during an extremely cold winter. It created the controversial HEAT Shelters.

== Composition ==
The team was chaired by former Mayor Gregor Robertson, and was composed of elected officials and housing stakeholders.

=== Elected members ===
The three publicly elected members of the team were:

- Mayor Gregor Robertson (Chair)
- Kerry Jang, Vancouver City Councillor (Council Liaison)
- Raymond Louie, Vancouver City Councillor

=== Non-elected members ===
The non-elected members were:

- Janice Abbott – Executive Director, Atira Women's Resource Society
- Jim Chu – Chief, Vancouver Police Department
- Patricia Daly - Chief Medical Officer, Vancouver Coastal Health Authority
- David Eby – Executive Director, BC Civil Liberties Association
- Michael Flanigan – Director of Real Estate Services, City of Vancouver
- Judy Graves – Outreach Coordinator, Housing Department, City of Vancouver
- Cameron Gray, Managing Director, Department of Social Development, City of Vancouver
- John MacKay – Strand Development Corporation, Board member of StreetoHome Foundation
- Shayne Ramsay, CEO, BC Housing
- Patrick Stewart, Chair, Aboriginal Homelessness Steering Committee
