= Kerry Jang =

Canadian politician

Kerry Jang (鄭文宇) is a Canadian politician and psychologist. He previously served as councillor on Vancouver, British Columbia's City Council between 2008 and 2018. From 2013, he also represented the city of Vancouver on the Greater Vancouver Regional District Board as a director.

Prior to his election as councillor, Jang served as a professor of psychiatry at the University of British Columbia, a position he returned to after leaving politics.

== Background ==
Born and raised in Vancouver, Jang was the eldest of three siblings. His father, Leslie, was a Vancouver School Board (VSB) plumber for 20 years, and his mother, May, had an administrative career with the Provincial Court of British Columbia, taught Chinese cooking at the VSB's night school program, and sold cookware. Jang's paternal grandfather had three wives, of which Jang's paternal grandmother was third, and twenty-one children. Jang's grandfather made a fortune as a merchant after immigrating from China, but lost it all in the Great Depression. Jang's maternal grandfather was a pig farmer in China and became a tailor after immigrating to Canada.

== Education ==
He attended Renfrew Elementary School prior to Windermere Secondary School, where he was scholastically mediocre. After graduating from high school, he worked on improving his grades at Vancouver Community College and then later transferred to Simon Fraser University where he went to complete his Bachelor's and Master's degrees in Psychology.

He earned his Ph.D. in Personality Psychology at the University of Western Ontario, where he initially studied under the highly controversial Canadian psychologist J. Philippe Rushton, who was known for his research on race, intelligence and penis length. Jang has described the experience of witnessing Rushton's censure, and the impact it had on his understanding of politics:

"his theory was that Asians are the smartest people on earth. I didn’t believe it, because, mathematically, if you look at IQ scores there’s so much overlap, there’s no difference. He was wrong. He was censured by the university and I skeedaddled out of his lab within three months. What that taught me was the power of activism. People challenged him. They shut him down. I learned you can take on the big guy in a respectful way. It opened up a wide range of options."

== Politics ==
In September 2006, Jang announced that he planned to seek the federal NDP nomination for the Vancouver Kingsway riding, after being called by Jack Layton, the leader of the NDP. The incumbent was David Emerson, who had crossed the aisle to the Conservative Party after the earlier election in 2006. Jang subsequently backed out of the race.

He was first elected councilor in the 2008 Vancouver municipal election under the Vision Vancouver banner, and re-elected in the 2011 and 2014 municipal elections. He was one of three elected city officials who served on Homeless Emergency Action Team, which conceived the controversial Homeless Emergency Action Team (HEAT) shelters.

In June 2014, Jang faced a court petition to remove him and fellow councilor Geoff Meggs from office for allegedly violating rules on conflict of interest in connection with the rezoning of a public housing project.

In October 2016, Jang came under fire from Chinese Canadians after participating in the raising of a People's Republic of China national flag on the grounds of the Vancouver City Hall, sporting a red scarf. The event, organized by the Canadian Alliance of Chinese Associations to mark China's National Day, is one of many flag ceremonies held at city hall. The Alliance of the Guard of Canadian Values, a group of mainland Chinese immigrants which has protested local celebrations of Communist leader Mao Zedong, started an online petition calling for Jang's resignation. "I was shocked," said Meena Wong, former mayoral candidate for COPE, "to have my city councillor in my city hall raising the flag wearing the symbol of loyalty to communism, I was dumbfounded." Jang tried to deflect criticism by suggesting that the Chinese Canadian protesters were "rooted in ignorance and racism. [...] To them it doesn't matter if it's a Communist government in China, they're just anti-Chinese."

Jang announced in January 2018 he would not run in the municipal election to be held in November that year.

== Family ==
Jang and his wife Vicki reside in the Renfrew-Collingwood area in East Vancouver. They have two children.
