= Homeless Emergency Action Team shelters =

The low-barrier Homeless Emergency Action Team (HEAT) shelters were announced on December 9, 2008 by Vancouver Mayor Gregor Robertson to assist Vancouver’s homeless citizens during an extremely cold winter. The province of British Columbia, City of Vancouver and Streetohome Foundation each provided funding of $500,000 at the time. They were conceived by the Homeless Emergency Action Team.

There were a total of 5 shelters:

- 1435 Granville Street, operated by RainCity Housing
- 1442 Howe Street, operated by RainCity Housing
- 51B Cordova Street, operated by the Portland Hotel Society
- 240 Northern Street, operated by the Vancouver Aboriginal Friendship Centre
- 320 Hastings Street, operated by the First United Church of Canada

In March 2009 the province of British Columbia provided an additional $1.5 million to keep the shelters open until the end of June.

The shelters at 1435 Granville Street and 1442 Howe Street were controversial. Community residents cited concerns with lack of public consultation, fights, public urination, defecation, public sex, and open drug use. British Columbia Housing Minister Rich Coleman cited the need for laying out rules of operation and the need for better community consultation. He called Mayor Robertson's bargaining on housing homeless people "amateurish" and later apologized for the remark. Mayor Robertson reached an agreement with Housing Minister Rich Coleman and came to a mutual decision to close the Granville Street shelter and reassess the Howe Street shelter.

On June 29, 2009 the province of British Columbia announced that funding for the 1435 Granville Street shelter ended and that the shelter would close on July 1, 2009 and that the 1442 Howe Street shelter would be put into a 30-day community consultation process to determine its future.

On July 30, 2009 the province of British Columbia announced the 1442 Howe Street shelter would shut down on August 7, 2009. It shut down early on August 5, 2009, two days ahead of schedule, as alternate housing was found.

On September 15, 2009, Vancouver city staff issued a report warning Mayor Robertson and the Vancouver City Council that they should no longer expect the HEAT shelters to be funded after the 2009-2010 fiscal year.

On January 5, 2010, Mayor Robertson announced that the controversial shelter at 1435 Granville Street, in a predominantly residential neighbourhood, would re-open the following day without robust neighbourhood consultations. It was scheduled to close by April 30, 2010. The city planned to have an open house approximately 2 weeks after re-opening the shelter.
