= Windermere Secondary School =

Public high school in Vancouver, British Columbia, Canada

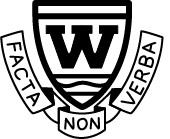

Location
- 3155 East 27th Avenue; Vancouver, British Columbia, V5R 1P3; Canada

Information
- Type: Secondary school
- Motto: "Facta Non Verba" (Actions, Not Words)
- Founded: December 1, 1961
- School board: School District 39 Vancouver
- Superintendent: Helen McGregor
- Area trustee: Christopher Richardson
- School number: 3939020
- Principal: Marea Jensen
- Grades: 8–12
- Enrollment: 1,009 (2017)
- Capacity: 1,500
- Language: English
- Area: Renfrew-Collingwood
- Colours: Blue and Orange
- Mascot: Warrior Bear
- Team name: Windermere Warriors
- Website: windermere.vsb.bc.ca

Windermere Secondary School is a public secondary school located on the east side of Vancouver, British Columbia, Canada. The student body comprises a diverse population originating from 40 countries. There are 32 languages identified as the language spoken in the home. The most common are Chinese, English, Vietnamese, and Tagalog.

== Current ==
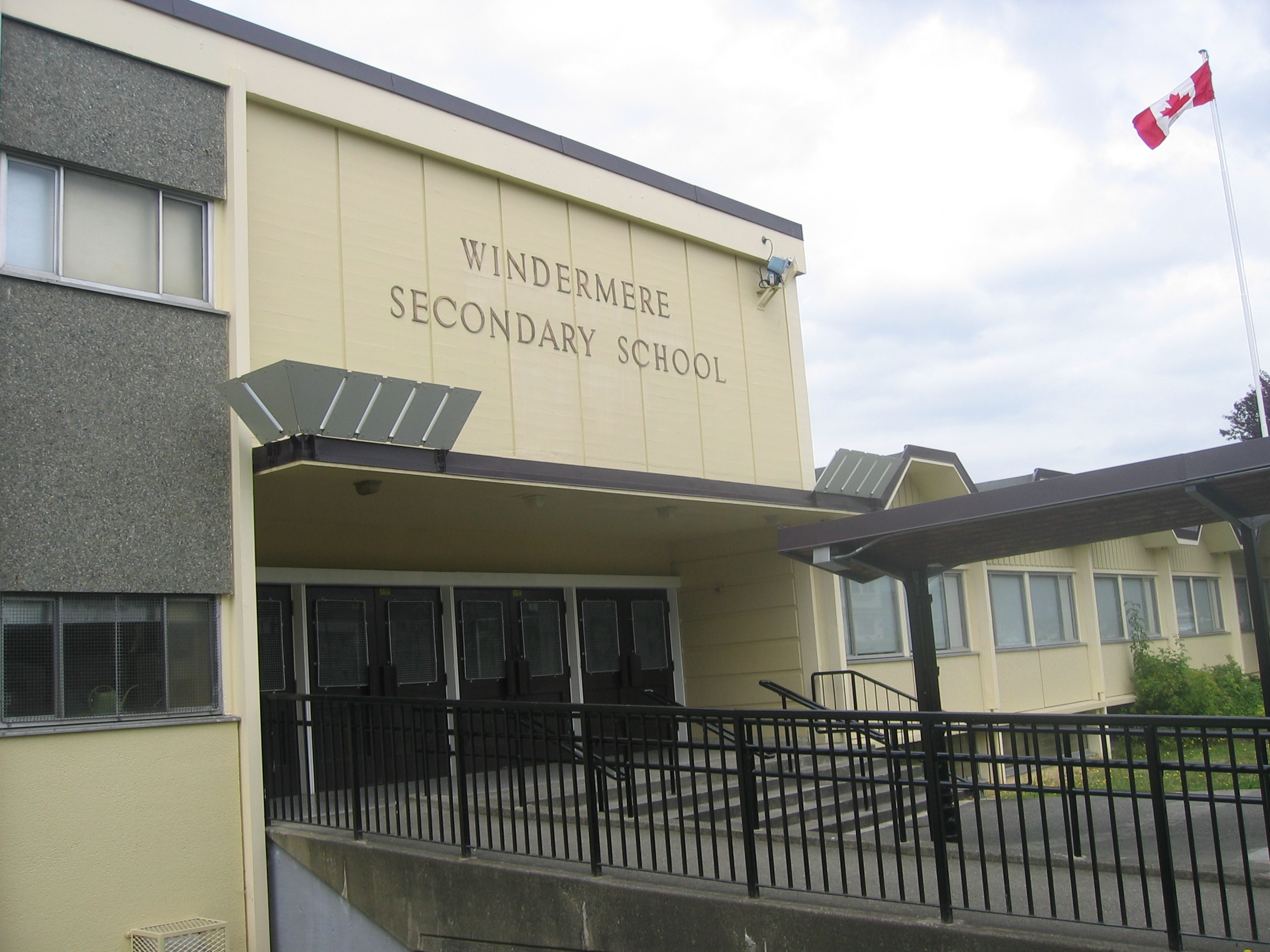
Windermere Secondary School

=== Leadership program ===
The school offers a mini-school program called the Leadership Program, where students develop leadership skills, are involved in the community, and set goals for the future.

The leadership program focuses on health and fitness, volunteering, academics, and outdoor education. Throughout grades 8 to 12, there is a focus on reading, where students read a variety of books as part of the Social Studies curriculum. The program also teaches about the environment, as well as social and personal responsibility.

The health and fitness aspect of the program focuses on personal diet and health choices. Outdoor activities are regarded as one of the most important parts of the program; students train for various outdoor activities in preparation for camping trips once a year throughout grades 8 to 12. Activities during camping trips include hiking, biking, rock climbing, kayaking, and winter sports. Students will also have a chance to take a course for CPR in grades 9 and 12.

Volunteering is a large part of the program, as there are plenty of opportunities where students can assist and engage with the community. In Grade 11, students take what they have learned and apply them via collaborating with neighboring elementary schools to develop projects regarding sustainability. Students in Grade 11 also organize the school's Climate Change Conference in the fall and the annual Earth Day Parade & Festival in April. The parade runs along Commercial Drive in Vancouver and has attracted thousands of participants. Environmental activists such as David Suzuki and Grand Chief Stewart Phillip have supported and spoken at the festival. Environmental advocacy groups such as the Wilderness Committee have also supported the Earth Day Celebration in various ways.

=== Mini-school ===
A second mini-school, the Athena Arts program, was added to Windermere in 2008. The program previously ran through Grades 8 to 12; however, in 2010 it was changed to run for Grades 8 to 10 only.

Since the early 2000s, Windermere has prepared a "Link Crew program" every summer. The goal of this program is to prepare new grade 8 students for secondary school under the leadership of grade 11 and 12 students.

=== Athletics ===
On November 9, 2023, the Windermere Junior Boys Volleyball Team won the Vancouver Secondary Schools Athletic Association (VSSAA) Junior Boys Volleyball City Championships after defeating the Sir Charles Tupper Tigers 3–1 in sets.

Two weeks later, on November 23, 2023, the Windermere Bantam Girls Volleyball Team won the Vancouver Secondary Schools Athletic Association (VSSAA) Bantam Girls Volleyball City Championships, defeating the Templeton Titans 2-1 in sets.

=== Fitness park ===
On the corner of Lillooet and 27th Avenue, Windermere has Vancouver's first community fitness park where users can learn how to do various exercises across 16 stations by scanning the attached QR codes on them and visiting the Windermere Community Fitness Park website. Construction on the outdoor facility was completed in June 2022, with the addition of two outdoor table tennis courts being completed in December 2023.

== Notable alumni ==
- Raymond Louie — Canadian politician and Vancouver City Councillor (2002–2018)
