= Tim Louis (British Columbia politician) =

Canadian politician (born 1958)

Vancouver City Councillor
- In office 1999–2005

Personal details
- Born: August 13, 1958 (age 68)
- Party: Coalition of Progressive Electors
- Education: Langara College; University of British Columbia

Tim Louis (born August 13, 1958) is a lawyer and municipal politician in Vancouver, British Columbia, Canada. He was elected to the Vancouver Park Board in 1990 and 1993, and later to Vancouver City Council as a member of the Coalition of Progressive Electors (COPE) in 1999 and 2002.

== Education, advocacy and professional life ==
Tim Louis graduated South Delta Secondary School (class of 1976), and went on to attend Langara College (class of 1979) and the University of British Columbia where he graduated from law school in 1983. While a student at UBC, he co-founded the Public Interest Advocacy Centre (PIAC), a consumer watchdog nonprofit.

He articled with lawyer and then-city councillor Harry Rankin in 1984.

He also served on the board of BC Transit's paratransit service and was chair of the Vancouver Public Library Board.

== Political career ==
In 1990, Louis was elected to the Vancouver Board of Parks & Recreation and re-elected in 1993.

First elected to Vancouver City Council in 1999, Louis became known for his pointed questions aimed at addressing issues of social justice in the city of Vancouver. He was re-elected in 2002. Louis proudly showed off his progressive beliefs, often appearing at public functions in a red Che Guevara shirt.

Louis has been a critic of large government projects, including the Richmond-Airport-Vancouver rapid transit project and the 2010 Olympic Winter Games, but always in the spirit of protecting community priorities. He also takes a public stance on local and international causes; for example he has been an open critic of the U.S. blockade of Cuba and the Israeli blockade of Gaza.

In the 2005 municipal election, Louis attracted attention when he told the Vancouver Sun editorial board that he favoured establishing a city-owned non-profit brothel to help protect sex-trade workers. He lost his council seat in that election, finishing 17th with 43,349 votes.

In 2008, Louis ran for a nomination for city council within COPE, as part of a 'Keep It COPE' slate; he narrowly lost by six votes to Ellen Woodsworth. She along with David Cadman went on to become elected to council as part of COPE's combined slate with the Green Party and Vision Vancouver.

Louis sought re-election as a Vancouver city councillor in the municipal election of 2011 but lost, coming in 17th, with 43,926 votes.

== Personal life ==
Louis' long-time partner is Penny Parry, an artist and community advocate. They live in Kitsilano, a West Side neighbourhood of Vancouver.
