= George Affleck (entrepreneur) =

Canadian businessman, politician (born 1964)

George Affleck (born October 15, 1964) is a Canadian businessman, politician, and author. He was an on-air host with the Canadian Broadcasting Corporation (CBC) before launching Curve Communications, a Vancouver-based marketing agency.

Affleck served as a member of Vancouver City Council from 2011 to 2018. He was also the BC Liberal candidate for Vancouver-Fairview in the 2020 provincial election.

== Early life and education ==
Affleck was born in Vancouver, British Columbia, and has three sisters He studied business at Simon Fraser University (SFU) before working at Expo 86. He later worked on a co-op in Israel's Negev desert, took bets at a bookmaker's shop in England, and worked as a bartender before returning to Vancouver to study English literature at SFU. He subsequently journalism at Langara College.

== Career ==
=== Media career (1991—1998) ===
Affleck began his career in broadcast journalism as a regular guest host on CBC's Saturday Show and Sunday Show, later renamed North-by-Northwest. He was a regular contributor to Definitely Not the Opera as well as a writer and broadcaster on the Early Edition, BC Almanac and The Afternoon Show.

Affleck worked as a documentary producer for RadioSonic, and a music story producer on Realtime. He was also a freelance feature reporter for CBC News and a producer for news and current affairs programming with CBC Radio in Vancouver.

=== Curve Communications (2000–present) ===
In 2000, Affleck co-founded Curve Communications along with two colleagues, Laura Ballance and Duane Lennie, after receiving an assignment from the BC and Yukon Community Newspapers Association to assemble a historical anthology of its member newspapers. Following the publishing of the anthology in 1999, Curve began taking on additional clients, including the Pacific National Exhibition and the Cloverdale Rodeo.

Lennie left the company several years later, and in September 2008, Affleck and Ballance dissolved their partnership, with Affleck remaining president and chief executive officer. In the same month, Curve Communications was ranked the 63rd fastest-growing company in British Columbia by Business in Vancouver. As of January 2012, Affleck reportedly owned more than 30 percent of the company.

=== Political career (2011–2018) ===
Affleck was elected to Vancouver City Council in the municipal election held on November 19, 2011, as a member of the Non-Partisan Association (NPA) slate. He was re-elected to a second term on November 15, 2014. He retired from civic politics in 2018.

Affleck ran in the 2020 provincial election as the BC Liberal Party candidate for Vancouver-Fairview. He was defeated by George Heyman of the BC New Democratic Party, receiving 27.32 percent of the vote (7,570 votes).

Affleck later became a political opinion contributor to The Orca.

=== Writing career ===
Affleck wrote a historical anthology of the BC and Yukon Community Newspapers Associations' member newspapers. The book, Paper Trails, was published in 1999 by Arch Communications.

His second book, titled Buzz: How to Grow Your Small Business Using Grassroots Marketing, was published in 2015.

== Personal life ==
Affleck has three children, including two from his first marriage. He also has one child with his partner, Amanda Bates. They live in downtown Vancouver.
