= Tony Tang =

Canadian engineer and former politician

Tony Tang is a Canadian engineer and former municipal politician. He was elected to Vancouver City Council as part of the Vision Vancouver slate in 2011. He was defeated in his bid for re-election in the November 15, 2014 civic election, placing 16th in the race for 10 council positions with 49,414 votes.

== Life and career ==
Hailing from Hong Kong, Tang immigrated to Canada in 1969 and worked in the home construction sector for more than 22 years. He holds a master's degree in engineering from the University of British Columbia, and studied art through the Alberta College of Art. An engineer by profession, he is able to speak Cantonese and Mandarin fluently and was a board member of the Shaughnessy Heights Property Owners' Association for five years between 2001 and 2006. He was the chair of the Vancouver board of variance. In September 2009 he was accused by Ray Tomlin, a member of the Vancouver Board of Variance who was subsequently fired after making the allegation, of violating the Vancouver Charter by holding meetings in private.

== Board memberships ==
- Hastings Institute Board
- Vancouver City Planning Commission
- Seniors Advisory Committee
- Gastown Historic Area Planning Committee
