= Elizabeth Ball (politician) =

Canadian politician

Elizabeth Ball is a Canadian politician, actress, and founder of several theatre companies. She served non-consecutive terms on Vancouver City Council from 2005 to 2008 and from 2011 to 2018.

== Career ==
Ball was elected to Vancouver City Council in 2005 and re-elected in 2011 and 2014. She ran with the Non-Partisan Association (NPA). Ball did not seek re-election in 2008.

A graduate of the Playhouse Theatre, she taught theatre in education at the University of British Columbia for many years. She founded the Carousel Theatre company and school and co-founded the Waterfront Theatre on Granville Island. Ball has developed productions on First Nations, AIDS, eating disorders and youth violence, as well as modern-dress Shakespeare productions. She led her company to receive the City of Vancouver's Cultural Harmony Award.

Ball has served on the advisory committees for Seniors; Women; Children, Youth, and Families; the Arts and Culture Policy Council; the Hastings Institute; and Vancouver Civic Theatres. She also served as vice-chair of the Standing Committee on Planning, Transportation, and Environment. She established the Poet Laureate Program for Vancouver. She helped to found and serves on the Metro Vancouver Cultural Committee.

Ball has worked with the BC Entertainment Hall of Fame, the Vancouver Heritage Foundation, the Mavor Moore Theatre Company, and the Minerva Foundation for BC Women.

Ball has served on Vancouver Public Library Board; Co-chair, Mayor's Task force on Children and Childcare; Vancouver Heritage Foundation Board; Co-chair, City of Vancouver Film Task Force; Co-chair, City of Vancouver Creative Task Force; Director, Greater Vancouver Regional District Metro; Director, Metro Labour Relations Bureau; Director, Metro Parks Committee; Vice-chair, Metro Regional Cultural Task Force and Inaugural Committee; President, BC Entertainment Hall of Fame; and Executive, Minerva Foundation for BC Women.

Appointments to Council committees, advisory boards and committees and regional, provincial and national bodies include: Vice-chair, Standing Committee on Planning, Transportation, and Environment; Member, City Council Nomination Sub-Committee; Hastings Institute Board; Vancouver Civic Theatres Board; Vancouver Athletic Commission; Greater Vancouver Regional District Board (Metro Vancouver); Metro Vancouver Inter-government and Finance; Regional Culture Sub-Committee; Federation of Canadian Municipalities; Policing & Public Safety Committee; and the Women in Local Government Committee.

== Awards ==
She has received the Lifetime Achievement Medallion Award from the Children's Theatre Foundation of America, the Sam Payne Award for Humanity and Integrity from the Union of BC Performers (ACTRA), and the Lifetime Achievement Award from the Vancouver Theatre Alliance.

She has been recognized by the BC Entertainment Hall of Fame StarWalk, the Granville Island Outstanding Contribution Award, and the YWCA Woman of Distinction nominations.
