= Government and politics of Vancouver =

Government of Vancouver
- Coat of arms of the City of Vancouver
- Formation: April 6, 1886
- Charter: Vancouver Charter
- City: Vancouver, British Columbia

Legislative branch
- Legislature: Vancouver City Council
- Chair: Ken Sim (as mayor)
- Meeting place: Vancouver City Hall

Executive branch
- Mayor of Vancouver: Ken Sim
- City manager: Donny van Dyk
- Headquarters: Vancouver City Hall

Vancouver, unlike other British Columbia municipalities, is incorporated under a unique provincial statute, the Vancouver Charter. The legislation, passed in 1953, supersedes the Vancouver Incorporation Act, 1921 and grants the city more and different powers than other communities possess under BC's Municipalities Act.

The city is governed by the 10-member city council, a nine-member school board, and a seven-member park board, all elected for four-year terms. Unusually for a city of Vancouver's size, all municipal elections are at-large. In addition, residents of Vancouver vote for representatives in the Legislative Assembly of British Columbia and the House of Commons of Canada.

Historically, in all levels of government, the more affluent west side of Vancouver has voted along conservative or centre-right lines while the working-class eastern side of the city has voted along left-wing lines. However, in the 2015 federal election and the 2017 provincial election, the west side of Vancouver has shifted more towards left-wing candidates.

Unlike most other municipalities in Canada, Vancouver's civic politics operate under a system of locally based political parties, rather than unaligned independents.

== Municipal structure ==
The municipal government of Vancouver's structure is largely laid out in the Vancouver Charter. It consists of the Vancouver City Council, the Vancouver Park Board and the Vancouver School Board. The school board was created separately by the BC School Act but serves the municipality of Vancouver nonetheless.

=== City council ===
The Vancouver City Council consists of 10 city councillors and a mayor, who are each elected to four-year terms. The councillors are elected on an at-large basis, where individual voters pick a maximum of 10 among the pool of candidates to receive their vote. The mayor is elected separately on a first-past-the-post basis, with voters selecting one candidate among the pool to receive their vote.

The city council is the main legislative body of Vancouver. It has the right to regulate businesses and land-use, collect property tax, approve spending for the city government, and create and maintain city services.

=== Board of parks and recreation ===
Unique from other large Canadian cities, Vancouver has an independently elected park board. The board consists of 7 commissioners who are each elected at-large to four-year terms. The board is tasked with managing the public parks of Vancouver and organizing public events. The board manages and maintains 250 public parks and beaches.

=== School board ===
The Vancouver School Board manages the schools of Vancouver. It consists of 9 trustees, who are elected to four-year terms with at-large elections and 1 additional non-voting student trustee voted on by secondary school students. The board is charged by the BC School Act with maintaining and managing the public schools of Vancouver.

== History ==
Larry Campbell's election as mayor in 2002 was in part due to his willingness to champion alternative interventions for drug issues, such as supervised injection sites. The city adopted a Four Pillars Drug Strategy, which combined harm reduction (e.g. needle exchanges, supervised injection sites) with treatment, enforcement, and prevention. The strategy was largely a response to the endemic HIV and hepatitis C among injection drug users in the city's Downtown Eastside neighbourhood. The area is characterized by entrenched poverty, and consequently is home to the "low track" street sex trade and a bustling "open air" street drug market, which gave rise to a significant AIDS epidemic in the 1990s. Some community and professional groups—such as From Grief to Action and Keeping the Door Open—are fostering public dialogue in the city about further alternatives to current drug policies. The harm reduction strategies have been successful, with the deactivation of the St. Paul's Hospital Ward 10C, on May 27, 2014, due to the near-elimination of AIDS cases in British Columbia.

Timeline of Vancouver's municipal parties since 1930

Campbell chose not to run for re-election, and was subsequently appointed to the Senate of Canada. In the 2005 municipal election, the city council swung back to the right after a term dominated by the left-wing Coalition of Progressive Electors (COPE). NPA mayoral candidate Sam Sullivan narrowly defeated Jim Green for the position of mayor in 2005 and was joined by five of his party's members on council. The centre-left Vision Vancouver brought four members to council, with the final seat going to COPE. The NPA also won six of nine school board seats and five of seven park board seats, while the remaining board seats were won by COPE.

In the 2008 municipal election campaign, NPA incumbent mayor Sam Sullivan was ousted as mayoral candidate by the party in a close vote, which instated Peter Ladner as the new mayoral candidate for the NPA. Gregor Robertson, a former MLA for Vancouver-Fairview and head of Happy Planet, was the mayoral candidate for Vision Vancouver, the other main contender. Robertson defeated Ladner by a considerable margin, nearing 20,000 votes. The balance of power was significantly shifted to Vision Vancouver, which held seven of the 10 council seats. Of the remaining three, COPE received two and the NPA one. For park commissioner, four spots went to Vision Vancouver, one to the Green Party, one to COPE, and one to the NPA. For school trustee, there were four Vision Vancouver seats, three COPE seats, and two NPA seats.

== Municipal representation ==
=== Mayor ===
Pete Fry is the mayor of Vancouver as of the 2026 municipal election.

=== City council ===
Vancouver City Council (as of 2026)
Name	Party	Position
Pete Fry	Green	Mayor
Annette Reilly	Green	Councillor
Stephanie Smith	Green	Councillor
Camil Dumont	Green	Councillor
Sean Orr	COPE	Councillor, deputy mayor
Chloe Leslie	COPE	Councillor
Devyani Singh	COPE	Councillor
Solomon Yi-Kieran	COPE	Councillor
Bridget Burns	Green	Councillor
Lucy Maloney	OneCity Vancouver	Councillor
Mike Klassen	ABC Vancouver	Councillor

=== School board ===
Vancouver School Board (as of 2026)
Name	Party
Rory Brown	OneCity
Steve Cardwell (vice-chair)	OneCity
Melanie Cheng	COPE
Gwen Giesbriecht	COPE
Derek O'Keefe	COPE
Suzie Mah (chair)	COPE
Alisha Masongsong	Green
Krista Sigurdson	OneCity
Julie Strilesky	Green
Freddie Zhang	Student trustee

=== Park board ===
Vancouver Park Board
Commissioners	Party
Tom Digby	Green
Spencer Van Vloten	Green
T’uy’t’tanat Cease Wyss	COPE
Tamiko Suzuki	COPE
Breanne Smart	Green
Jamie Han	COPE
Sacia Burton	Green

=== 2004 plebiscite ===
A proposal to change Vancouver's council elections to run on a ward basis (like most major Canadian cities) rather than its at-large system was rejected by the populace in a referendum on October 16, 2004. Only 22% of city residents cast a ballot in this referendum.

== Provincial representation ==
Vancouver provincial election results
Year	New Democratic		Liberal		Conservative		Green	
2024	58.3%	147,090	—	—	32.8%	82,915	8.5%	21,422
2020	54.1%	128,374	30.3%	72,052	0.2%	465	14.6%	34,570
2017	51.7%	131,750	33.7%	85,967	0.2%	504	13.3%	33,942

In the Legislative Assembly of British Columbia, Vancouver has eleven constituencies. In the 2017 provincial election, the BC Liberal Party won three seats and the BC New Democratic Party won eight seats.

Riding	MLA	Party
Vancouver-Fraserview	George Chow	New Democratic
Vancouver-Hastings	Niki Sharma	New Democratic
Vancouver-Kensington	Mable Elmore	New Democratic
Vancouver-Langara	Sunita Dhir	New Democratic
Vancouver-Little Mountain	Christine Boyle	New Democratic
Vancouver-Point Grey	David Eby	New Democratic
Vancouver-Quilchena	Dallas Brodie	Conservative
Vancouver-Renfrew	Adrian Dix	New Democratic
Vancouver-South Granville	Brenda Bailey	New Democratic
Vancouver-Strathcona	Joan Phillip	New Democratic
Vancouver-West End	Spencer Chandra Herbert	New Democratic
Vancouver-Yaletown	Terry Yung	New Democratic

== Federal representation ==
Vancouver federal election results
Year	Liberal		Conservative		New Democratic		Green	
2025	51.1%	168,138	27.8%	91,523	19.0%	62,508	1.5%	4,990
2021	35.6%	96,947	20.8%	56,617	36.2%	98,753	4.2%	11,396
2019	32.2%	95,580	21.9%	64,889	28.8%	85,578	9.6%	28,564

In the House of Commons of Canada, Vancouver has seven constituencies. In the 2004 federal elections, the Liberal Party of Canada won four seats, while the New Democratic Party won one. In the 2006 federal elections, all the same MPs were re-elected, although David Emerson of Vancouver Kingsway later defected to the Conservative Party. In the subsequent 2008 federal elections, the Liberals won three seats, while the NDP picked up Vancouver Kingsway for a total of two seats. In the 2011 election, the NDP and Liberals both retained two seats each. The Conservatives won one seat, Vancouver South, their first win in the city since 1988.

In the 2015 election, the number of ridings for Vancouver was increased to six, with the Liberals winning four and the NDP winning two.

Riding	MP	Party
Richmond Centre—Marpole	Chak Au	Conservative
Vancouver Centre	Hedy Fry	Liberal
Vancouver East	Jenny Kwan	New Democrat
Vancouver Fraserview—South Burnaby	Gregor Robertson	Liberal
Vancouver Granville	Taleeb Noormohamed	Liberal
Vancouver Kingsway	Don Davies	New Democrat
Vancouver Quadra	Wade Grant	Liberal
