= Municipal charter =

Legal document establishing a municipality

A city charter or town charter (generically, municipal charter) is a legal document (charter) establishing a municipality such as a city or town. A charter is a municipal constitution, establishing the structure and powers of the local government.

The concept developed in Europe during the Middle Ages. Traditionally, the granting of a charter gave a settlement and its inhabitants the right to town privileges under the feudal system. Townspeople who lived in chartered towns were burghers, as opposed to serfs who lived in villages. Towns were often "free", in the sense that they were directly protected by the king or emperor, and were not part of a feudal fief.

Modern city charters are often granted to major cities and economic centres for the purpose of adapting their municipal governments to the needs of a major city, often granting them additional powers relative to the general-law municipalities, which may also be organized differently.

== Canada ==
In Canada, charters are granted by provincial authorities.

Province	City/Regional Municipality	Charter	Notes
Ontario	Toronto	City of Toronto Act, 2006	
Quebec	Quebec	Charter of Ville de Montréal, metropolis of Québec	
British Columbia	Vancouver	Vancouver Charter	
Alberta	Edmonton	City of Edmonton Charter, 2018 Regulation	
Alberta	Calgary	City of Calgary Charter, 2018 Regulation	
Manitoba	Winnipeg	The City of Winnipeg Charter Act	
Alberta and Saskatchewan	Lloydminster	Lloydminster Charter	Governs the status of Lloydminster as a border city
New Brunswick	Saint John	An Act Respecting the Royal Charter of the City of Saint John	First city charter in Canada
Nova Scotia	Halifax	Halifax Regional Municipality Charter	

== Philippines ==
Since the beginning of American colonial rule, Philippines cities were formally established through laws enacted by the various national legislatures in the country. The Philippine Commission gave the city of Manila its charter in 1901, while the city of Baguio was established by the Philippine Assembly which was composed by elected members instead of appointed ones. During the Commonwealth era, the National Assembly established an additional ten cities. Since achieving independence from the United States in 1946 the Philippine Congress has established 149 more cities (as of September 2024), the majority of which required the holding of a plebiscite within the proposed city's jurisdiction to ratify the city's charter.

== Sweden ==
In Sweden until 1951, cities were established by royal charter.

== United Kingdom ==
In the United Kingdom, cities are established by royal charter.

== United States ==
In the United States, such charters are established either directly by a state legislature by means of local legislation, or indirectly under a general municipal corporation law, usually after the proposed charter has passed a referendum vote of the affected population.

A municipal charter is the basic document that defines the organization, powers, functions and essential procedures of the city government. The charter is, therefore, the most important legal document of any city. Municipalities without charters, in states where such exist, are known as general-law municipalities or cities.

== See also ==
- Home rule
