= Sole Food Street Farms =

Urban agriculture project

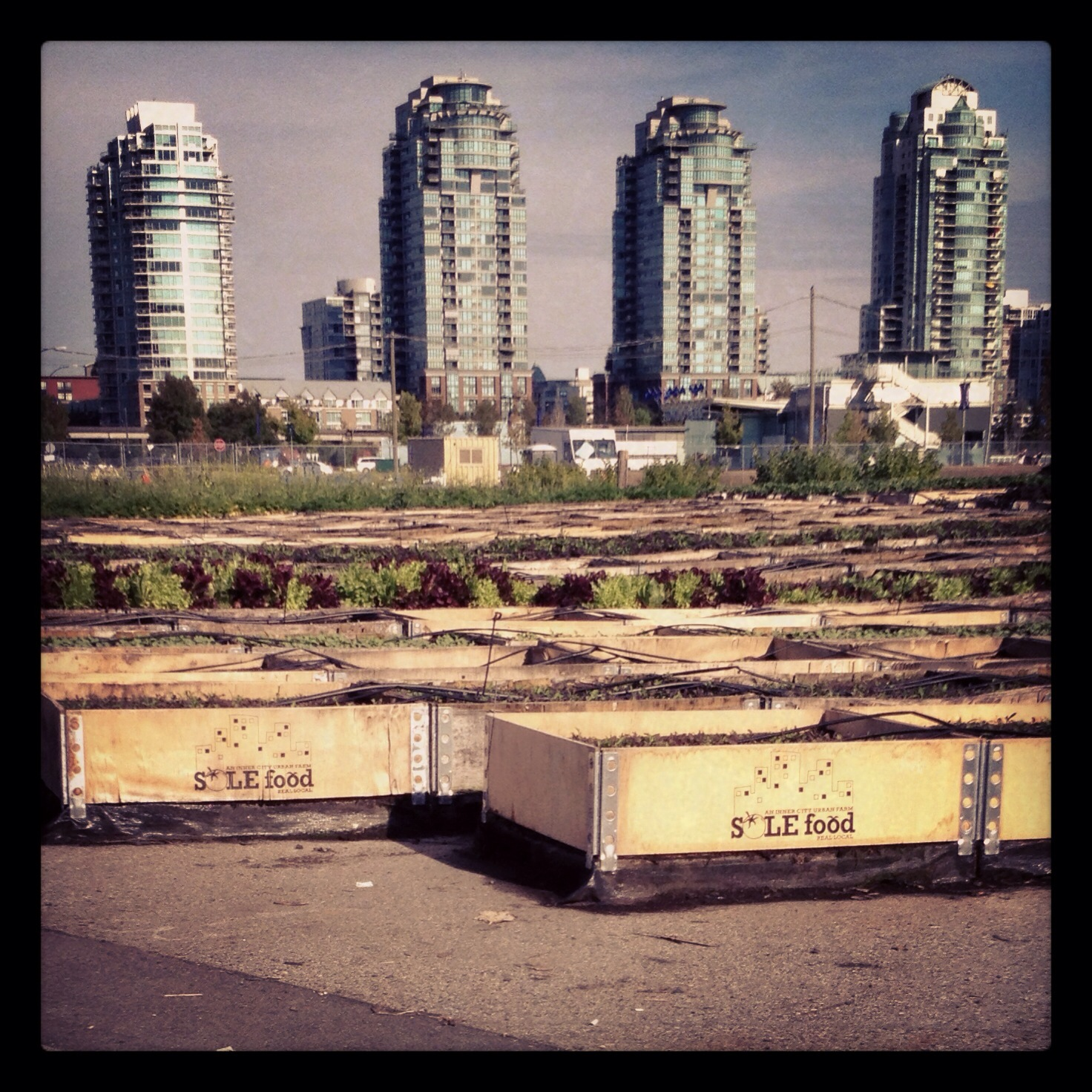
Sole Food Street Farms: False Creek Location

Sole Food Street Farms is an urban agriculture project in Vancouver, British Columbia, Canada. Founded in 2008 by Michael Ableman and Seann Dory, Sole Food's mission is to provide low-income residents of the Downtown Eastside with "jobs, agricultural training, and inclusion in a supportive community of farmers and food lovers." It is a subsidiary of Cultivate Canada, a local charity that promotes human ecology-related social projects. Sole Food is the largest urban farm attempted in Vancouver, and through it Ableman hopes to demonstrate that "urban agriculture can in fact be considered a serious enterprise for urban areas." He emphasizes that it is of a larger scale than community gardens and that it could be a "serious enterprise for urban areas." Since its inception, Sole Food has been met with significant community support. Grants from a variety of sources including the city of Vancouver, banks, as well as philanthropists enable Sole Food to continue expanding their operations. Sole Food's vision aligns closely with Vancouver’s Greenest City 2020 Action plan to increase production of locally grown food, hence the city has provided them with generous support. Being a non-profit social initiative, priority is placed upon improving the community: employees, many of whom are current or recovering drug addicts receive paid training, and 10% of the produce harvested is donated to neighbourhood agencies. Due to the small scale of Sole Food and the use of high-quality seeds, the food produced is relatively expensive compared to conventionally grown crops. As such, the food grown does not go toward feeding impoverished residents of the Downtown Eastside, but rather to a number of upscale restaurants that specialize in locally sourced ingredients. The produce is sold to 30 restaurants in Vancouver that specialize in using locally-sourced ingredients. It also sells to seven local farmers’ markets.

== Locations ==
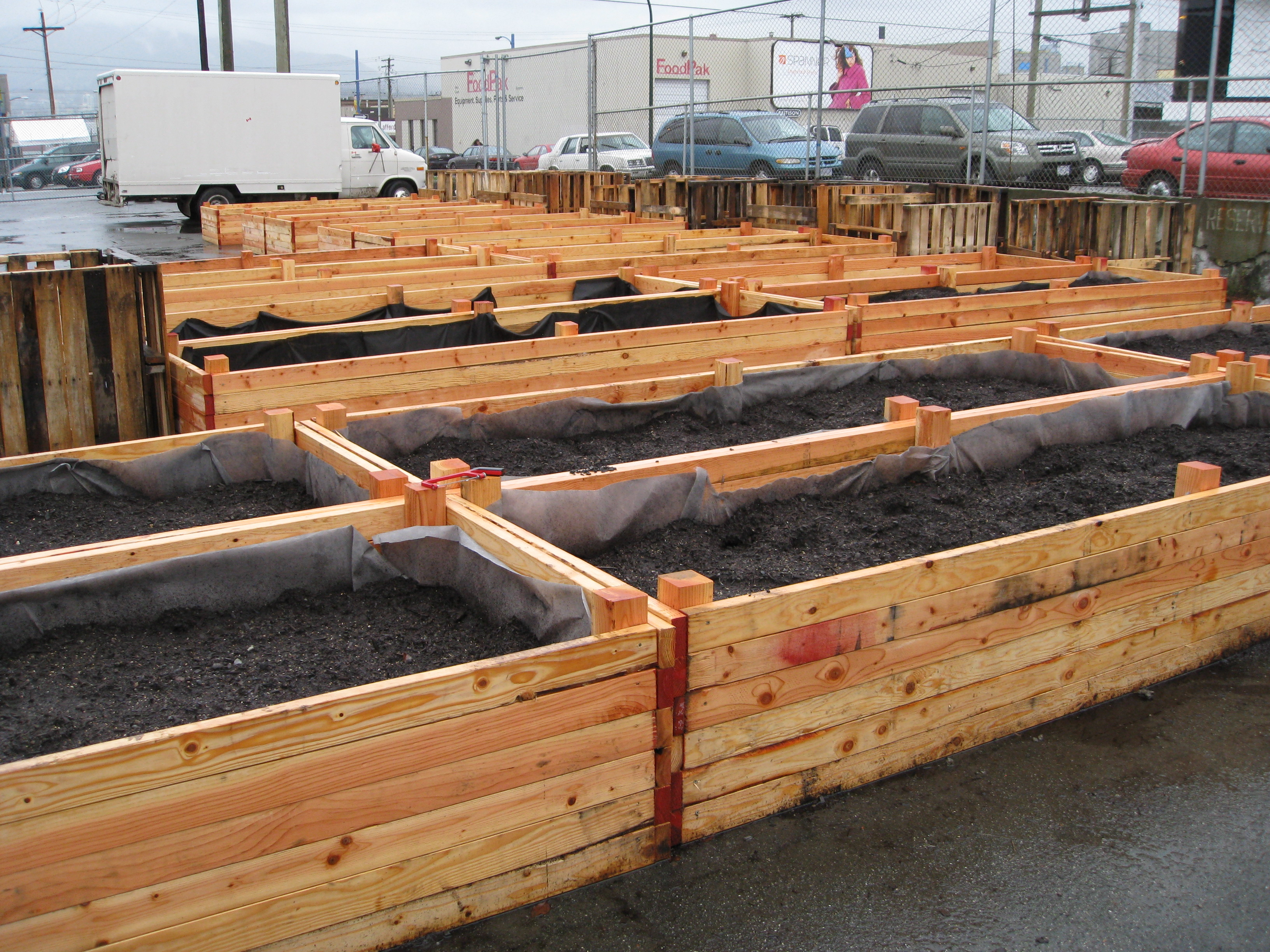
Sole Food Street Farms planter boxes at Strathcona location

Sole Food currently operates farms in four locations in East Vancouver. These sites, established on un-used land are leased to Sole Food by the city or Landowners on a temporary year-to-year basis. Like most urban areas, the soil at these sites is not suitable for growing due to contamination. In order to grow food in these circumstances, crops are planted in specially designed boxes which keep them separate from the soil or concrete below. In addition, they are built on shipping pallets allowing them to be moved with a forklift on short notice should the land be developed. These portable planters enable Sole Food to relocate without having to replant their crops, which is important because the land they use is only temporarily leased.

=== Main Street: Sole Food Urban Ochard ===
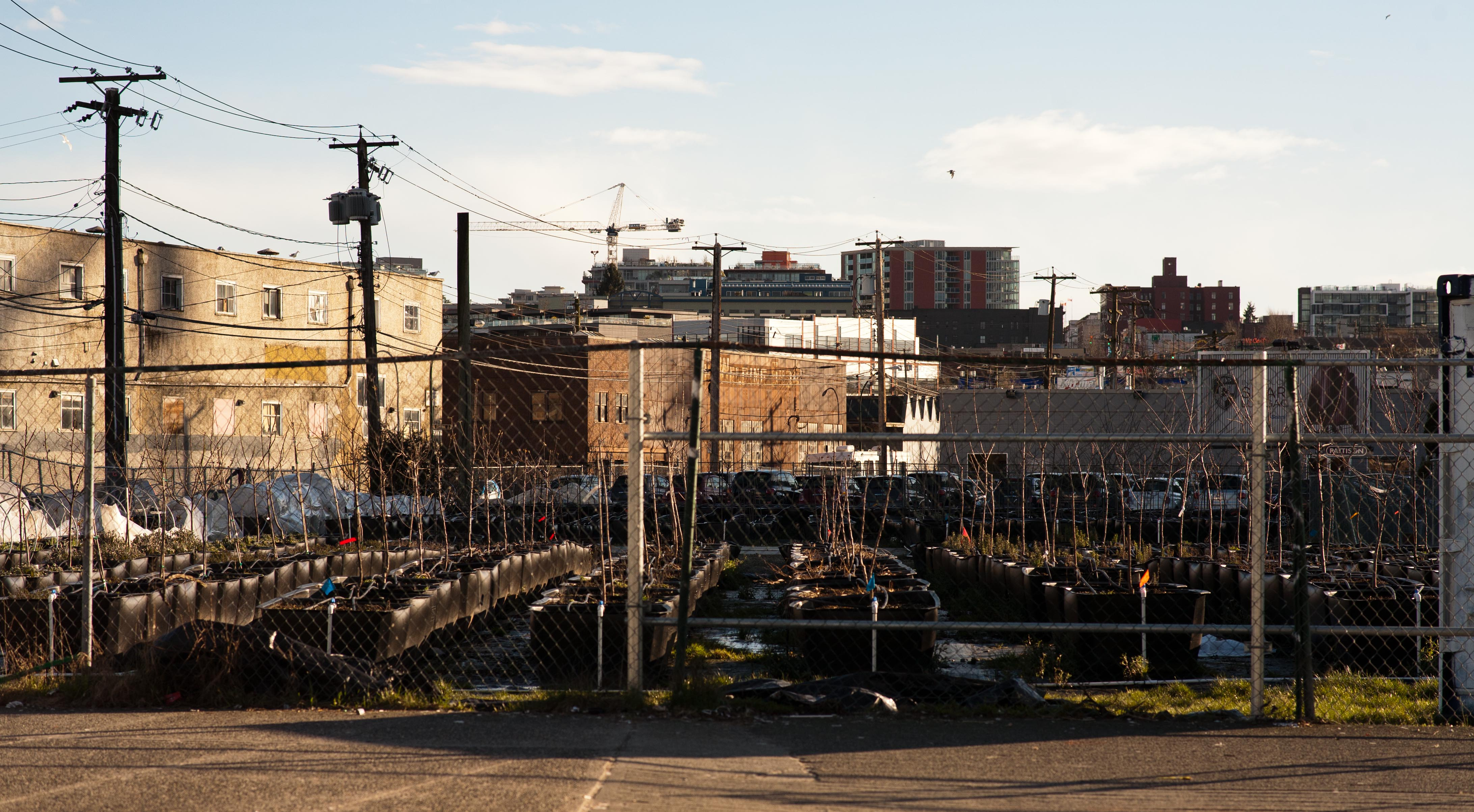
Sole Food Urban Orchard at the Main Street Location

In July 2013 Sole Food opened the largest urban orchard in North America at the corner of Main St. and Terminal Ave. in Vancouver, British Columbia, Canada. It was leased to Sole Food by the city of Vancouver for $1 per year. The land, which had previously been an old gas station site, had been empty for over a decade due to contamination in the soil. Sole Food was able to circumvent this by the use of the aforementioned portable planters. They planted 500 trees at the orchard which includes several types of fruits such as apple and pear as well as many different types of culinary herbs. The orchard is scheduled to reach commercial production levels between 2016 and 2018. Other than providing large quantities of food, it provides many jobs with some employees working year round. Normally, Sole Food is required to reduce the number of work hours during the slow winter months. Installation of the site took place over a year and a half period with most of the work being completed 2 months prior to the official opening.

=== Strathcona ===
This is the first site farmed by Sole Food beginning in 2010. It is located next to the Astoria Hotel at Hastings and Hawks Avenue. Many of the original staff reside in this neighborhood. Techniques and ideas were developed at this site such as the space saving vertical strawberry planters and are being used at other locations.

=== False Creek ===
This site is located close to BC Place, a sports stadium at Pacific Boulevard and Carrall Street. This is their biggest site totalling 2 acres and receives a great deal of traffic from pedestrians, cyclists and drivers.

=== East Van ===
This site is located in an industrial area below the Grandview Viaduct at East 1st and Clark Avenue. Here, Sole Foods operates one acre of unheated greenhouses allowing them to grow warmer weather crops and extend their growing season into the colder winter months.

== See also ==
- History of green policies in Vancouver
- Urban agriculture
