= Ableman =

Ableman is a surname. Notable people with the surname include:

- Michael Ableman, American writer
- Paul Ableman (1927–2006), English playwright and writer

== Places ==
- Ableman, Wisconsin, the former name of Rock Springs, Wisconsin

== See also ==
- Ableman v. Booth, United States Supreme Court case
