= History of green policies in Vancouver =

== Pre 1900 ==
- 1854 – City of New Westminster established as capital for Crown colony of BC
- 1886 – Decision to move CPR to Burrard Inlet (instead of New Westminster)
- 1886 – Vancouver's first City Council made a momentous decision by petitioning the Federal Government to lease 1,000 acres of a largely logged peninsula for park and recreation purposes.
- September 27, 1888 – Stanley Park was officially opened establishing the fledgling city's first official "greenspace". Council decided to set up an autonomous and separately elected committee to govern all park and recreation matters in Vancouver. And so the Vancouver Board of Parks and Recreation was born, the only elected body of its kind in Canada. The system now includes more than 200 parks (over 1300 hectares) but its heart remains in the cool, lush, evergreen oasis of Stanley Park, named for Lord Stanley, Governor General of Canada in 1888 when the park was officially opened.
- 1890 – Vancouver Electric Railway and Light Co. oversees the launch of Vancouver's first electric street car service
- 1891 – Westminster and Vancouver Tramway Co. begins its interurban rail passenger service from New Westminster to Vancouver

== 1900–1940 ==
- 1910 – The "City Beautiful movement" comes to Vancouver
- 1918 – The Vancouver Natural History Society (Nature Vancouver) is founded
- 1921, January – BC Electric discontinues the 15-year-old practice of exchanging burned-out carbon filament lamps for free new ones. Tungsten and nitrogen are used instead.
- 1928 – Harland Bartholomew, a scientific city planner, presents his comprehensive plan to the City
- 1929 – Jan. 1st, amalgamation of the Vancouver, South Vancouver and Point Grey districts
- 1930s – West Coast modernism emerges (concrete highrises, freeways) – the labour force only knows how to build in the modernist tradition;
- 1935–1936 – City Hall is built
- 1936 – Non-Partisan Association (NPA) established to maintain political local non-interference in local development politics and to reduce NIMBY political responses

== 1940–1950 ==
- 1942 – Traffic Planning Manual – the consolidation of engineering know how on transportation in a manual with codes, standards and instructions – marks the shift in city planning to focus on accommodating cars and motor ways
- Post War II – Italian and Greeks build the water and sewage infrastructure for the city
- 1943 – The Vancouver Foundation is created
- 1946 – Recommendation by City of Vancouver planners to form a regional planning board
- 1946 – The Vancouver Savings & Credit Union (Vancity), a cooperative credit union, is created; its objectives are grounded in social sustainability
- 1948 – Fraser River flood
- 1949 – June 21, creation of Lower Mainland Regional Planning Board
- 1949 – September 15, first meeting emphasizes seamless lines to a natural landscape, view corridors, connection to nature

== 1950–1960 ==
- 1950 – Sept., LMRPB begins official operations
- 1952 – 1st report: "Lower Mainland Looks Around"
- 1952 – The Air Pollution Control society is incorporated
- 1953 – Vancouver Charter granted by province gives city greater powers of self-government
- 1954 – Gerald Sutton Brown, Planner and Co-Director of the Technical Planning Board – considers how to develop the city around the car

== 1960–1970 ==
- Women's movement, blacks, gay-lesbian; popular culture rises; federal government providing funding for public participation, social housing, infrastructure, post-war development
- 1961 to 1962 – BC Electric becomes a Crown Corporation - BC Hydro and Power Authority (BC Hydro)
- 1962 to 1972 – development of the West End, displacement of homes for block highrises; in response to rapid development, neighbourhood movements form
- 1964 – Chance and Challenge"
- 1966 – Official Regional Plan" and "A Regional Parks Plan"
- 1967 – The Greater Vancouver Regional District (GVRD) is created
- 1967 – The project to build a large interurban freeway is rejected; Vancouver would become the only North American major metropolitan area without an inner-city highway
- 1968 – Expo
- 1968 – December, Scientific Pollution and Environmental Control Society (SPECS) founded
- 1969 – LMRPB dissolved by W.A.C. Bennett
- 1969 – September 2, 'Don't Make a Wave' protest against US nuclear testing at Amchitka Island in October
- 1969 – A small group of BC environmental activists becomes affiliated with the Sierra Club
- 1969 – The Society Promoting Environmental Conservation (SPEC) is founded

== 1970–1980 ==
- 1970 – The Electors' Action Movement (TEAM) council articulates concerns for a 'livable city'
- 1971 – Gastown Riot
- 1971 – Greenpeace established
- 1972 – Changes to the Canadian Immigration Act
- 1972 – Shirley Chan, Darlene Marzari and the residents of Strathcona stop the freeway into Vancouver
- 1972 – TEAM leads city council and advocates for more participatory planning practices
- 1972 – May 2, Provincial Societies office in Victoria registers 'Greenpeace Foundation'
- 1973 – Agricultural Land Reserve established
- 1974 – West Coast Environmental Law launched
- 1976 – Habitat Conference

Heritage Preservation Act (Provincial NDP introduces this) Development of South West False Creek

- 1977 – The Canadian Environmental Network (RCEN) begins to connect environmental organizations across the country

== 1980–1990 ==
- 1980 – The Wilderness Committee is founded
- 1981 – Affiliated with the RCEN, the British Columbia Environment Network (BCEN) starts acting in the province specifically
- 1982 – Mike Harcourt elected Mayor
- 1986 – Expo 86

Post Expo – high density urban development plan Gordon Campbell elected Mayor – puts greater focus on the regional district

- 1986 – Skytrain officially begins its operations
- 1986 – Spearheaded by Linda Crompton, VanCity launches its socially responsible mutual fund, the Ethical Growth Fund

== 1990–2000 ==
- 1990 – VanCity establishes the first EnviroFund
- 1990 – David Suzuki launches the environmental organization holding his name together with other thinkers and activists
- 1991 – The organization Better Environmentally Sound Transportation (BEST) is founded by a group of cyclists
- 1992 – The EcoDesign Resource Society is created
- 1993 – The International Institute for Sustainable Cities is established in Vancouver
- 1993 – Farm FolK / City Folk is founded
- 1994 – VanCity Credit Union sponsors Vancouver's first "Greening our Cities" Conference (with the Social Planning and Research Council (SPARC) of B.C., in association with the David Suzuki Foundation) at the Maritime Labour Centre near the Port of Vancouver
  - Participants from the Lower Mainland, Vancouver, Winnipeg, Victoria, and San Francisco
  - This conference was a "seeding operation" to the process of an alternative urban development plan
- 1995 – CityPlan: Direction for Vancouver
- 1996 – Livable Region Strategic Plan (LRSP)
- 1997 – Community Visions Program
- 1997 – The nonprofit charitable land trust The Land Conservancy (TLC) is founded
- 1998 – Canada's Action Plan for Food Security in response to the World Food Summit Plan of Action
- 1999 – As a result of concerns about sustainable growth, the organization Smart Growth BC is created

== 2000–2010 ==
- 2000 – Led by students and with the intention to benefit the surrounding community as a whole, the UBC Farm project begins
- 2000 – ForestEthics is founded
- 2001 – Vancouver architect Peter Busby chairs the Sustainable Building Canada Committee under the Royal Architectural Institute of Canada
- 2002 – Confederation of Progressive Electors resides over city council
- 2002 – BEST receives the first Vancity grant award of 1 million dollars, used to help launch the Central Valley Greenway project
- 2002–2003 – In a competition involving 9 cities all over the world, the Canadian team develops a 100-year, urban-sustainable plan for Greater Vancouver and wins the Grand Prize; the entry is named cityPLUS, referring to Cities Planning for Long-term Urban Sustainability
- 2003 – The Canada Green Building Council is officially launched in Vancouver
  - A coalition of public and private sector partners in the building industry, aims to accelerate the advancement of environmentally sustainable buildings
  - Responsible for certifying buildings under the Leadership in Energy and Environmental Design (LEED) Program
- 2003 – Vancouver is elected as the host city of the 2010 Winter Games
- 2004 – April 16, Seabird Island First Nation revealed green homes that last up to 100 years.
- 2004 – The BC Sustainable Energy Association (BCSEA) is launched
- 2005 – The Community Gardens Policy is revised
- 2006 – Vancouver hosts the World Urban Forum
- 2007 – "BC Energy Plan: A Vision for Clean Energy Leadership"
- 2007 – The very first Jane's Walk, promoting walkable neighbourhoods and which would later spread in many cities all over the world, including Vancouver, happens in Toronto
- 2009 – Canada Line, linking downtown Vancouver to the airport, opens to the public
- 2009 – May 19, Contribution to help fund aboriginal involvement in renewable energy hydro-projects in B.C.
- 2009 – July 17, B.C. First Nation unveils solar power project in the Tsouke Nation.
- 2009 – BC's Green Energy Task Force

== 2010–Today ==
- 2010 – The Olympic and Paralympic winter games take place
  - 17 days of Olympic Games events, 2566 athletes, 82 participating countries, 10,000 media representatives and 3 billion television viewers worldwide.
- 2011 – April 5, Premier Christy Clark announced that First Nations that were interested in pursuing clean energy business can now access a unique provincial government fund.
- 2011 – July 20, People in 16 aboriginal communities benefited from the first round of funding from the First Nations Clean Energy Business Fund.
- 2011 – The Greenest City action plan (GCAP) is a City of Vancouver urban sustainability initiative which was approved by Vancouver city council in July 2011.
