= GCAP =

GCAP may refer to:

- Game Connect Asia Pacific, a game development conference
- GCap Media, British commercial radio company
- Global Call to Action Against Poverty, a global anti-poverty movement/coalition
- Global Combat Air Programme, a multinational fighter jet development
- Grupo Capoeira Angola Pelourinho, Capoeira group by Mestre Moraes
- Guanylate cyclase-activating protein
- Vancouver's greenest city action plan, an urban sustainability initiative of Vancouver

== See also ==
- GPAC (disambiguation)
