= Lawrence Fraser Abbott =

American editor and writer

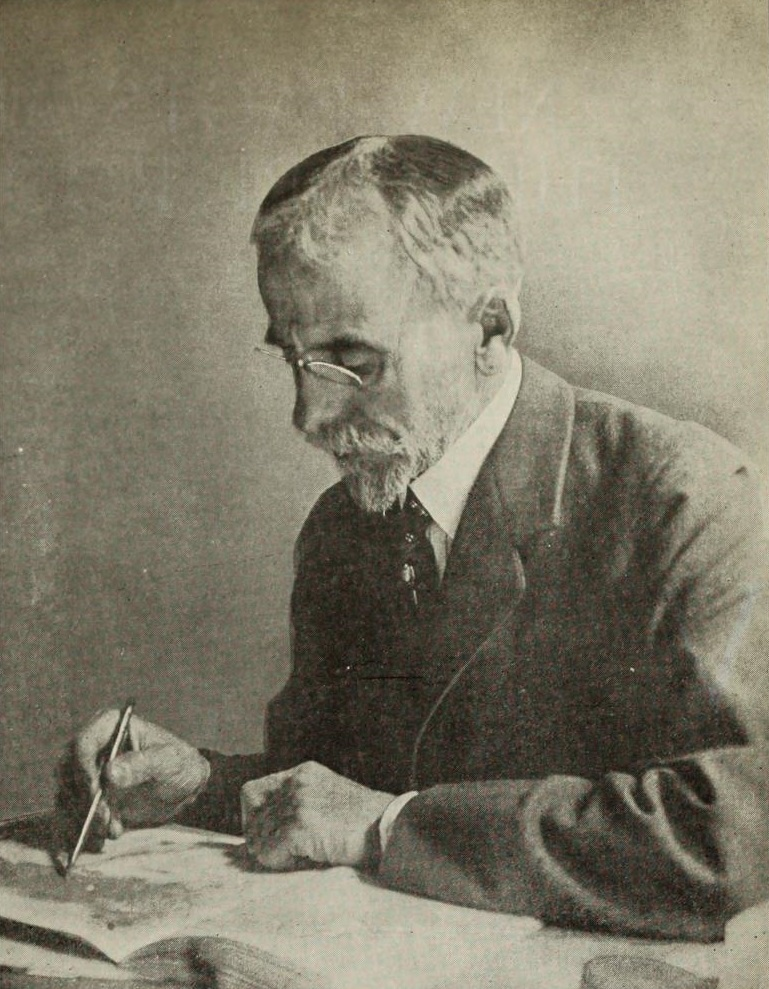
- Portrait of Lawrence Fraser Abbott
- Born: June 25, 1859; Brooklyn
- Died: 1933 (aged 73–74)
- Education: Amherst College
- Parent: Lyman Abbott

Lawrence Fraser Abbott (June 25, 1859 in Brooklyn – 1933) was an American editor, historian, and writer, son of Lyman Abbott.

== Biography ==
He was born in Brooklyn, New York, to Lyman Abbott. He graduated from Amherst College in 1881. In 1891, he became president of the Outlook Company. As well as being a close friend to Theodore Roosevelt, throughout almost his whole life, he was also secretary to Roosevelt during the latter's tour of Europe and Africa (1909–10), and edited Roosevelt's African and European Addresses (1910). He was the author of an article on Theodore Roosevelt in the Encyclopædia Britannica (1911), and of Impressions of Theodore Roosevelt (1919) and The Story of NYLIC (1930). He also edited The Letters of Archie Butt: Personal Aide to President Roosevelt (1924)

== See also ==
- Clara Whitehill Hunt
- Michael Ableman
- Adeline Pond Adams
