= Gregor Robertson =

Gregor Robertson may refer to:

- Gregor Robertson (footballer) (born 1984), Scottish footballer
- Gregor Robertson (politician) (born 1964), Canadian politician
