= Clara Whitehill Hunt =

American librarian (1871–1958)

- Born: June 25, 1871; Utica, New York
- Died: January 10, 1958 (aged 86); Sudbury, Massachusetts
- Occupation: Librarian

Clara Whitehill Hunt (June 25, 1871 - January 10, 1958) was an American teacher, librarian, writer, and advocate for children's library services.

== Early life and career ==
Clara Whitehill Hunt was born in Utica, New York, in 1871. Born to Edwin and Mary M. (Brown) Hunt, who were originally from Sudbury, Massachusetts, Clara grew up on the farm. She attended the Utica Free Academy in Utica, New York for grade school, which has since been turned into a nursing home. Her father was known to have taught natural science at the same school during her attendance. She graduated high school in 1889 and began a career as a teacher shortly thereafter.

After graduating high school in 1889 and becoming a teacher, Clara was promoted to principal of Utica Public School, where she had begun her career. Visiting the library often during her career as a teacher, Clara found the library to play an important role in the lives of children and teachers. Upon meeting with a trained librarian, Miss Louise Cutler, she was determined to become a trained librarian. Clara went on to attend the New York State Library School at Albany in 1986.

After spending two years in library school, Clara landed a job in Philadelphia and opened the New Children's Room of the Old Apprentices Library. From there she became an assistant in the reference department in Newark Public Library system, where she became acquainted with various library duties. During her time working in the library, Clara excelled at the task of working with children, which became her main focus as the years went on. In 1901, she was put in charge of the Newark Public Library's children's room, where she had first been hired as an assistant within the reference department. A few years later, she went to work at the Brooklyn Public Library as Superintendent of Work with Children. She spent 37 years within this position, from the year of 1903 to 1940.

Over the years, as more branches surfaced, Clara helped to design and equip the children's rooms within the new established libraries. She was known to have designed the staff rooms as well, which she took pride in doing. One of her most famous designs, Clara provided the vision behind the children's room of the Central Library. Within the Brooklyn Public Library system, Clara help to open the first children's library in 1914, now noted as the Stone Avenue Branch. This library in particular housed smaller furniture, larger windows, decorations, a fireplace, and classrooms.

Along with the other tasks noted above, Clara also trained children's librarians and staffed them within these libraries. Beginning in 1914, these informal trainings soon turned into formal training courses for children's librarians, which was incorporated into many schools' curricula thereafter.

In addition to training new recruits, designing children's rooms, and working as a superintendent, Clara lectured for various library schools, edited for magazines, and authored books as well. There are five children's books that Clara is most well known for:

- 1915- What Shall We Read to the Children?
- 1916- About Harriet
- 1918- The Little House in the Woods
- 1924- Peggy's Playhouse
- 1932- The Little House in the Green Valley

Clara noted that she was inspired to write, What Shall We Read to the Children, after the mothers of the kindergartners that she worked with asked her this same question many times. She noted that '"About Harriet, "was inspired by a young friend of hers who grew up in the city, a very different life from her own. She had very strong opinions on the level at which a children's book should be written. Described as fair and idealistic, Clara was known to have not allowed comic books within her collections. During her career, she canvassed American publishers to produce high quality picture books that were up to the same standards of those that were being produced in Europe. The Houghton Mifflin Company began to publish high quality picture books by author E. Boyd Smith after being persuaded by Clara.

For the Brooklyn Daily Eagle (1922), she stated (as noted on the Brooklyn Public Library website),

"A long continued diet of mediocre reading will weaken a child's mental powers and ruin his appetite for good books...the child allowed to indulge in the cheap series habit becomes a sort of physiological dope fiend...Of course, some strong-brained children break away from a trash reading period, just as they emerge unhurt from the diseases of childhood."

Among many accomplishments, Clara presented the very first of the American Library Association Newbery Awards in 1922. She also was chairmen for the very first Newbery Committee, 1921–1922. She presented this award to Hendrik Willem van Loon for his work, The Story of Mankind. This yearly award began as a plan to honor the most distinguished children's author of the previous calendar year with a bronze medal for their achievement. Originally named the John Newbery Medal, it was named after an old London book seller who has been credited as one of the first to give special attention to children's collections.

== Legacy ==
Having devoted most of her career to children's library services, Clara retired from her duties as a librarian in 1939. At this point, she moved to Sudbury, Massachusetts, which would be her final resting place. She died on January 11, 1958, in her parents' home town.

A legacy of her career is at the Brooklyn Public Library: the Clara Whitehill Hunt Collection of Children's Literature. This collection encompasses 13,000 books, pamphlets, and periodicals, which date all the way back from 1741 up unto the 1950s. Within this collection is the Old Juvenile collection, which features 4,500 pieces dating from 1741 into the early 1900s. The Hunt Collection is available for viewing by appointment only.

== See also ==
- Lawrence Fraser Abbott
- Michael Ableman
- Adeline Pond Adams
