= GPAC =

GPAC may refer to

- Geelong Arts Centre (formerly Geelong Performing Arts Centre), an arts centre in Geelong, Victoria, Australia
- General purpose analog computer, a mathematical model of analog computers
- GPAC Project on Advanced Content, an open source multimedia framework for research and academic purposes
- Gram-positive anaerobic cocci, a class of bacteria
- Great Plains Athletic Conference, a college athletic conference in the United States

== See also ==
- GCAP (disambiguation)
- GenderPAC, a gay/lesbian/transgender political action committee based in Washington, D.C.
