= Lyman Abbott =

Theologian, editor, author (1835–1922)

Lyman J. Abbott
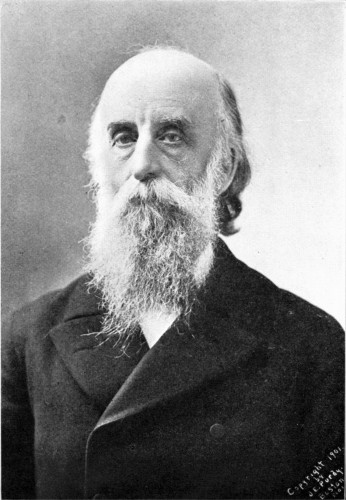
- Born: December 18, 1835; Roxbury, Massachusetts, US
- Died: October 22, 1922 (aged 86); New York City, US
- Resting place: Woodlawn Cemetery, New Windsor, New York
- Occupations: Congregationalist theologian, pastor, editor, author
- Spouse: Abby F. Hamlin
- Children: 6, including Lawrence Fraser Abbott
- Father: Jacob Abbott
- Relatives: John S. C. Abbott (uncle)

Signature
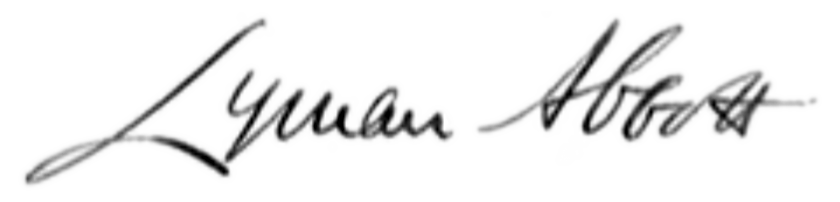

Lyman J. Abbott (December 18, 1835 – October 22, 1922) was an American Congregationalist theologian, editor, and author.

== Biography ==
=== Early years ===
Abbott was born at Roxbury, Massachusetts, on December 18, 1835, the son of the prolific author, educator and historian Jacob Abbott, and his mother being Harriet Vaughan. Abbott grew up in Farmington, Maine, and later in New York City. Abbott's ancestors were from England, and came to America roughly twenty years after Plymouth Rock.

He graduated from the New York University in 1853, where he was a member of the Eucleian Society, studied law, and was admitted to the bar in 1856. Abbott soon abandoned the legal profession, however, and after studying theology with his uncle, John Stevens Cabot Abbott, was ordained a minister of the Congregational Church in 1860. He was married October 14, 1857, to Abby F. Hamlin, whose father Hannibal Hamlin (1809–1863) was the cousin of the politician Hannibal Hamlin of Boston, Mass.

=== Career ===
He was pastor of the Congregational Church in Terre Haute, Indiana, from 1860 to 1865 and of the New England Church in New York City in 1865–1869. From 1865 to 1868 he was secretary of the American Union Commission (later called the American Freedmen's and Union Commission). In 1869 he resigned his pastorate to devote himself to literature.

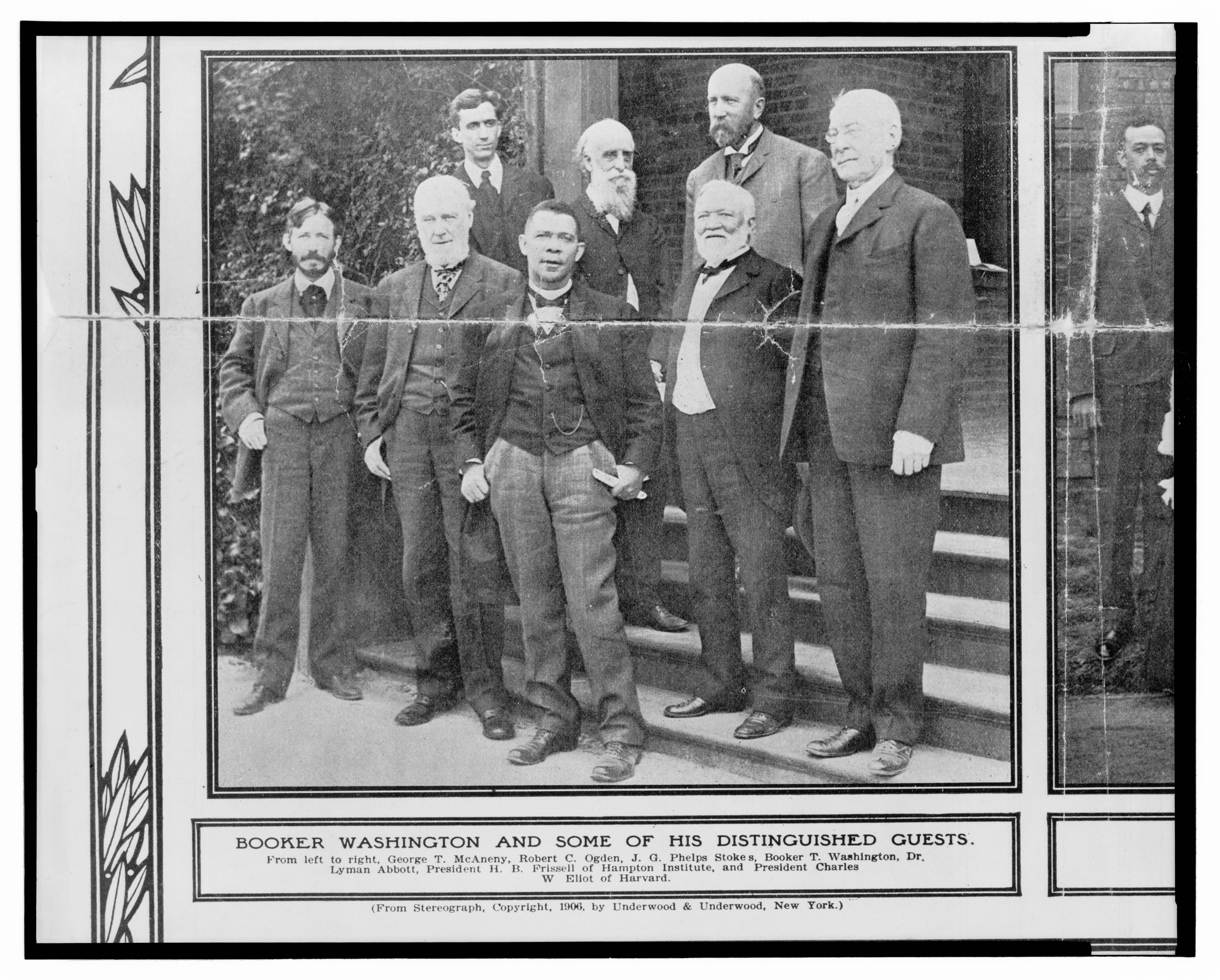
With Booker Washington and other dignitaries

Abbott worked variously in the publishing profession as an associate editor of Harper's Magazine, and was the founder of a publication called the Illustrated Christian Weekly, which he edited for six years. He was also the co-editor of The Christian Union with Henry Ward Beecher from 1876 to 1881. Abbott later succeeded Beecher in 1888 as pastor of Plymouth Church, Brooklyn. He also wrote the official biography of Beecher and edited his papers.

From 1881 Abbott was editor-in-chief of The Christian Union, renamed The Outlook in 1891; this periodical reflected his efforts toward social reform, and, in theology, a liberality, humanitarianism and nearly unitarian. The latter characteristics marked his published works also.

Abbott's opinions differed from those of Beecher. Abbott was a constant advocate of Industrial Democracy, and was an advocate of Theodore Roosevelt's progressivism for almost 20 years. He later adopted a pronouncedly liberal theology.

He was a pronounced Christian Evolutionist. In two of his books, The Evolution of Christianity and The Theology of an Evolutionist (1897), Abbott applied the concept of evolution in a Christian theological perspective. Although he objected to being called an advocate of Darwinism, he was an optimistic advocate of evolution, once saying "what Jesus saw, humanity is becoming."

Abbott was a religious figure of some public note and was called upon on October 30, 1897, to deliver an address in New York at the funeral of economist, Henry George. He ultimately resigned his pastorate in November 1898.

His son, Lawrence Fraser Abbott, accompanied President Roosevelt on a tour of Europe and Africa (1909–10). In 1913 Lyman Abbott was expelled from the American Peace Society because military preparedness was vigorously advocated in The Outlook, which he edited, and because he was a member of the Army and Navy League. During World War I, he supported the government's war policies.

He received the degree D.D. from the University of the City of New York in 1879; from Harvard in 1891, from Yale in 1903, and LL.D. from Western Reserve in 1900.

=== Death and legacy ===
Lyman Abbott died on October 22, 1922, and was buried in Woodlawn Cemetery at New Windsor, New York.

The editors of The Outlook kept their normal routine, publishing without "departure from the normal course of publication" since that was what their departed colleague would have wanted. The issue asked readers for understanding as the paper "wait[ed] until [the] next week to give to his friends, known and unknown, a record of his life and of the tributes which marked his passing." A brief tribute appeared in that issue, but the November 8th edition contained the official remembrance and tributes. Fifteen pages in that issue dealt with Abbott, and the publishers included "several long essays in Abbott's honor from close relatives, shorter tributes from friends and past associates, and blurbs from many American press companies."

The many diverse and prominent author who contributed tributes "demonstrated the scope and magnitude of Lyman Abbott's influence within American religious and intellectual culture during his long career." Prominent examples include a re-published 1915 tribute from former United States president Theodore Roosevelt and articles from prestigious newspapers such as The New York Times and the New York Herald. Roosevelt praised Abbott for being "one of those men whose work and life give strength to all who believe in this country," and the New York Herald recalled Abbott's ability to "convey his valuable opinions to the entire intellectual public." Dr. Henry Sloane Coffin noted at a later memorial service, "Measured by the number of people he reached, Dr. Abbott was unquestionably the greatest teacher of religion of this generation."

Abbott's lasting influence and widespread appeal is readily apparent in later evaluations of his life. Abbott's one biographer, Ira V. Brown, confirmed Abbott's importance via "testimonials by the dozen," and added that Abbott "directly reached several hundred thousands of people" through his work as a "minister, lecturer, author, and editor." Abbott was "something of a national patriarch" by the time of his death, and according to Brown, he was "no less than a modern oracle" to thousands of followers. Abbott influenced hundreds every week through his sermons at the prestigious Plymouth Avenue Congregationalist Church. He also gave speeches at many American colleges, published several books that sold between five and ten thousand copies, and edited the Outlook that, at its peak, sold "about 125,000 copies a week." The magazine "was a prominent news source for Protestant ministers and laypeople all over the United States, demonstrating Abbott's lasting influence."

== Works ==
- Sermons of Henry Ward Beecher (Editor). (2 vols., 1868)
- Jesus of Nazareth (1869)
- Illustrated Commentary on the New Testament (4 vols., 1875)
- A Study in Human Nature (1885)
- What is Christianity? in: The Arena (1891)
- Life of Christ (1894)
- The Evolution of Christianity (1896) (Lowell Lectures, reissued by Cambridge University Press, 2009, ISBN 978-1-108-00019-2)
- The Theology of an Evolutionist (1897)
- Christianity and Social Problems (1897)
- Life and Letters of Paul (1898)
- The Life that Really is (1899)
- Why Go To Church? (1900) (Published in "The Day's Work Series" by L. C. Page)
- Problems of Life (1900)
- The Rights of Man (1901)
- Henry Ward Beecher (1903)
- The Other Room (1903)
- The Great Companion (1904) (New edition published September 1906)
- The Christian Ministry (1905)
- The Personality of God (1905)
- Industrial Problems (1905)
- "Impressions of a Careless Traveler" (1907)
- Christ's Secret of Happiness (1907)
- The Home Builder (1908)
- The Temple (1909)
- The Spirit of Democracy (1910)
- America in the Making (1911) (Yale Lectures on the Responsibility of Citizenship)
- Letters to Unknown Friends (1913)
- Reminiscences (1915)
- The Twentieth Century Crusade (1918)
- What Christianity Means to Me (1921)
