= Woodlawn Cemetery (New Windsor, New York) =

Details
- Established: 1870
- Location: New Windsor, New York
- Country: United States
- Coordinates: 41°28′35″N 74°01′40″W
- Type: Rural
- Owned by: Town of New Windsor
- Size: 72 acres
- Find a Grave: Woodlawn Cemetery

Woodlawn Cemetery is a historic cemetery in New Windsor, New York exemplifying the rural style. For more than a century, a private organization maintained it, until the Town of New Windsor took ownership in 2017.

== History ==
By the late 19th century, Newburgh's cemeteries had become crowded and disturbed by urban sprawl. The expansive St. George's Cemetery, designed with Downing influence decades earlier, succumbed to these conditions as well. On October 22, 1870, the Newburgh Woodlawn Cemetery Association incorporated to purchase land for a new rural cemetery to meet the city's needs. Instead of searching for land within the city boundaries, the association looked south to the suburb of New Windsor-on-Hudson and purchased fifty acres about a mile from Quassaick Creek.

== Description ==
The entrance to the cemetery is on Quassaick Avenue, through a marble gateway. Installed in 1897, Lewis S. Sterrit anonymously donated it to the cemetery for beautification purposes. D. C. Miller completed the design to Sterrit's wishes. The gates are topped with a sphere on either pillar, inscribed with the words "Woodlawn" and "Cemetery."

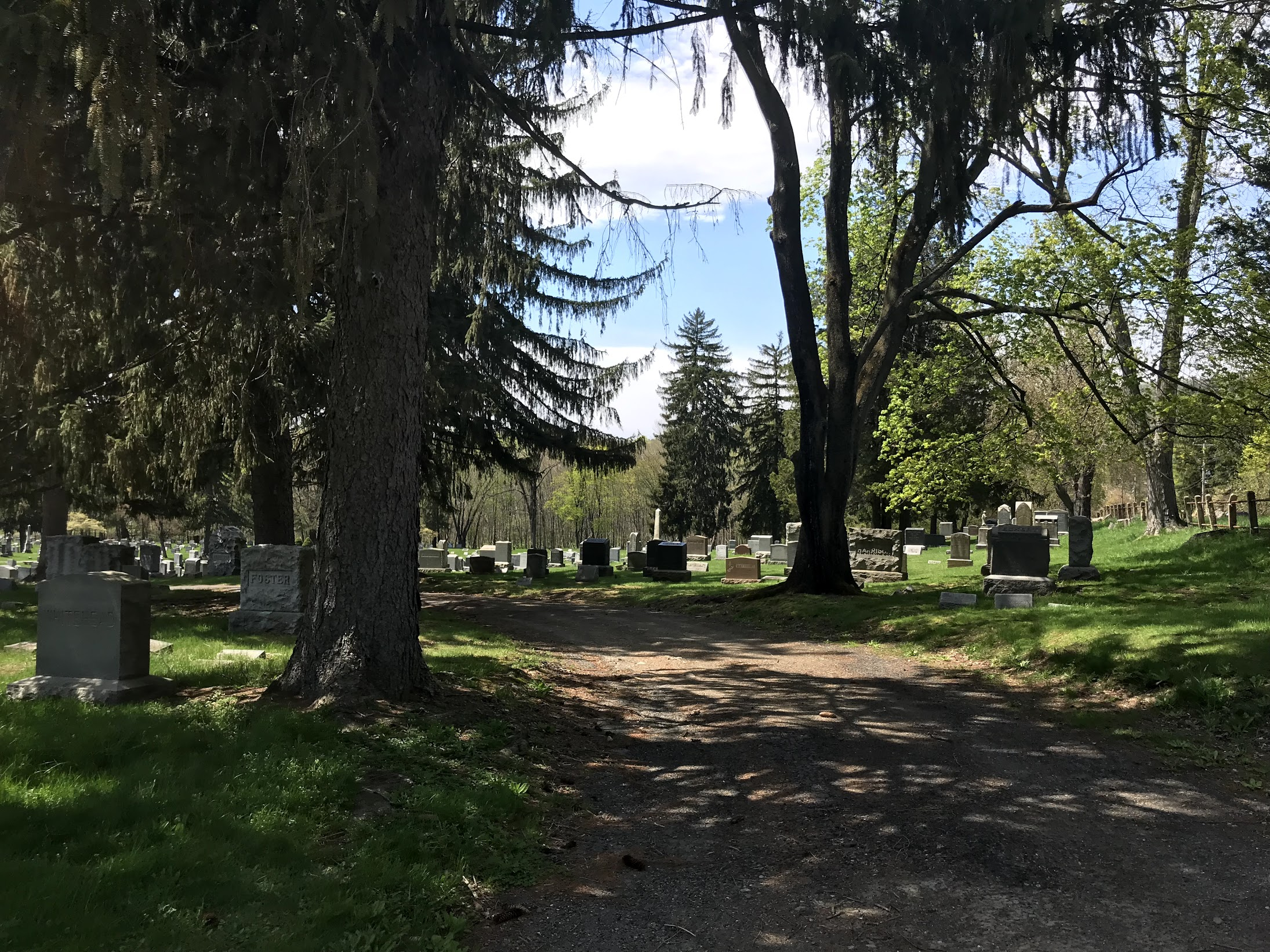
The oak groves beside Union Avenue, an older portion of the cemetery

The cemetery is composed of several sloping lawns, with different picturesque settings. The two most contrasting examples of this are the shaded groves against Union Avenue, and the man-made pond viewable from Erie Avenue. Originally laid with gravel, the central paths through the cemetery have been paved.

== Notable interments ==
- Lyman Abbott (1835–1922), a Congregationalist leader and theologian.
- Senda Berenson Abbott (1868–1954), Lithuanian-American who developed modern's women's basketball.
- Dubois Brown Alsdorf (1827–1907), reputable Black dance instructor and musician who owned a performing arts school in Newburgh.
- George Monroe Beebe (1836–1927), U.S. Congressman for New York's 14th District, governor of Kansas Territory.
- George Clark (1817–1871), first mayor of the City of Newburgh.
- Charles Clinton (1690–1773), patriarch of the Clinton Family and colonial politician.
- James Clinton (1736–1812), major general in the Continental Army, veteran of the French and Indian War.
- Eleanor Goodnough Deuell (1889–1967), female war journalist during the World wars, accredited by the Department of War.
- Frank Eugene Estabrook (1860–1918), civic architect of numerous Orange County buildings and residences, died by drowning.
- Anthony Mancinelli (1911–2019), Italian-American considered the world's oldest barber before his death at 108 years old.
- William H. Keefe (1854–1901), founder of the Newburgh Daily News.
- Benjamin Barker Odell, Jr. (1854–1926), Republican U.S. Congressman and 34th Governor of New York.
- Edward Manning Ruttenber (1825–1907), prolific local historian and author.
