= Adeline Pond Adams =

American art historian

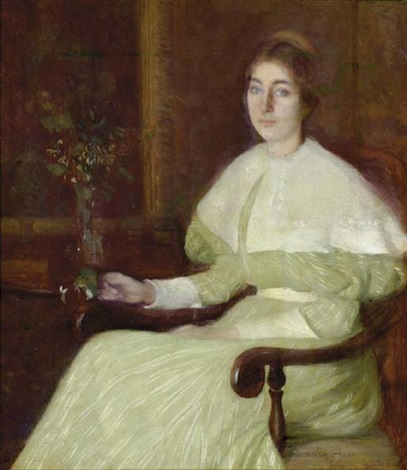
- Portrait by William Howard Hart
- Born: Adeline Valentine Pond; October 24, 1859; Boston, Massachusetts, US
- Died: July 1, 1948 (aged 88); New York City, US
- Spouse: Herbert Adams
- Writing career
- Subjects: art history fine art
- Notable awards: Herbert Adams Memorial Medal; Special Medal of Honor (National Sculpture Society)

Adeline Valentine Pond Adams (1859–1948) was an American writer and the wife of Herbert Adams. The chief subjects of her writings were American fine artists and art history. She published at least seven texts. On December 14, 1930, she was awarded a Special Medal of Honor by the National Sculpture Society. In 1947, she was the first recipient of the Society's Herbert Adams Memorial Medal.

== Biography ==
Adeline Valentine Pond was born in Boston. She began her art studies at the Massachusetts Normal Art School in 1880.

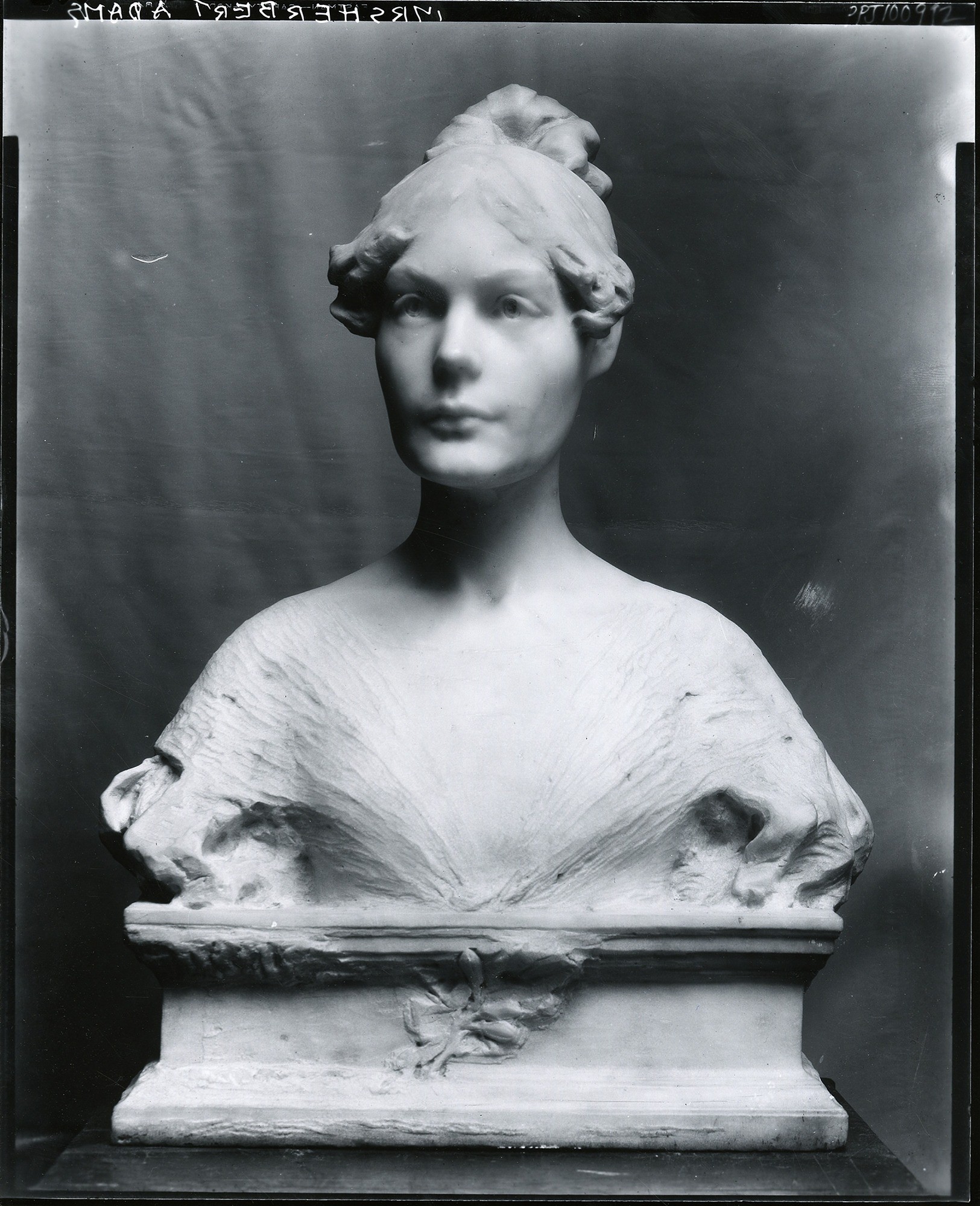
Bust of Adeline Valentine Pond by Herbert Adams in 1889

She met Herbert Adams in Paris in 1887. She posed for a marble bust that was eventually exhibited at the 1893 Chicago World's Fair. The couple married in 1889. Adams advocated for female sculptors including Laura Gardin Fraser, Evelyn Beatrice Longman, Janet Scudder, Bessie Porter Vonnoh, Abastenia St. Leger Eberle and Anna Hyatt Huntington. She also advocated for war memorials to be created by professional sculptors rather than mass-produced in factories.

Adams was a member of the Cornish (NH) Equal Suffrage League.

== Works ==
Adams's published texts include:

- The spirit of American sculpture
- The Amouretta landscape, and other stories
- "Daniel Chester French, sculptor"
- "Childe Hassam"
- "John Quincy Adams Ward; An Appreciation"
- "Sylvia"
- "An Exhibition of American Sculpture"
- "Our medals and Our Medals"

In addition to art criticism, Adams also wrote poetry, including two collections of poetry about her deceased daughters.

== See also ==
- Clara Whitehill Hunt
- Michael Ableman
