= Happy Planet =

Canadian juice and smoothie company

- Company type: Private
- Founded: 1994; 32 years ago
- Founders: Randal Ius, Gregor Robertson
- Headquarters: Burnaby, British Columbia
- Areas served: Canada, United States
- Products: Lemonade, fruit juices, smoothies, soups, milk, butter
- Website: http://happyplanet.com/

Happy Planet is a private company in Burnaby, British Columbia, Canada, known for making organic juices and smoothies. The company was started in 1994 by Randal Ius and Gregor Robertson. They originally started out with one farm producing carrot juice. At first, the company supplied primarily natural food stores and small restaurants and cafes. Now their products can be found Canada-wide as well as in parts of the Pacific Northwest United States. At present, the company ships several thousand bottles of juice per week.

== Products ==
The company draws a large percentage of its raw products from local farms. Happy Planet produces three products lines: juices, cooler (a mix of juice and tea), and smoothies. Most of the company's products are certified organic by the Certified Organic Associations of British Columbia and certified Kosher by BC Kosher. In May 2008, they also began a line of prepackaged organic soups. In early 2017, the company began selling organic cow's milk and butter under the banner name Happy Planet Creamery.

== Gregor Robertson ==
In 2005, Gregor Robertson left the company to run for the NDP in the riding of Vancouver-Fairview in the May 19 election. He subsequently became Mayor of Vancouver in 2008.
