= Vancouver Fraserview—South Burnaby =

Federal electoral district in British Columbia, Canada

British Columbia electoral district
- Interactive map of riding boundaries from the 2025 federal election

Federal electoral district
- Legislature: House of Commons
MP
Gregor Robertson
Liberal
- District created: 2023
- First contested: 2025

Demographics
- Population (2021): 117,482
- Census division: Metro Vancouver
- Census subdivision(s): Vancouver (part), Burnaby (part)

Vancouver Fraserview—South Burnaby (French: Vancouver Fraserview—Burnaby-Sud) is a federal electoral district in British Columbia, Canada. It came into effect upon the call of the 2025 Canadian federal election.

== Geography ==
Under the 2022 Canadian federal electoral redistribution the riding will largely replace Vancouver South.

- Loses the Sunset neighbourhood of Vancouver west of Fraser Street and north of 49th Avenue and points westward to Vancouver Granville and Vancouver Kingsway
- Gains all of Burnaby south of both Imperial Street and Kingsway from Burnaby South and New Westminster—Burnaby.

== Demographics ==
According to the 2021 Canadian census

Languages: 40.4% English, 19.5% Cantonese, 8.5% Mandarin, 5.7% Punjabi, 5.1% Tagalog, 2.4% Vietnamese, 2.1% Spanish, 1.6% Korean, 1.0% French

Religions: 46.2% No religion, 33.0% Christian (16.0% Catholic, 1.3% Christian Orthodox, 1.1% Baptist, 14.6% Other), 7.4% Sikh, 5.5% Buddhist, 3.6% Hindu, 3.1% Muslim

Median income: $36,800 (2020)

Average income: $47,320 (2020)

Panethnic groups in Vancouver Fraserview—South Burnaby (2021)
Panethnic group	2021	
Panethnic group	Pop.	%
East Asian (Note: Statistic includes total responses of "Chinese", "Korean", and "Japanese" under visible minority section on census.)	46,895	40.52%
European (Note: Statistic includes all persons that did not make up part of a visible minority or an indigenous identity.)	24,605	21.26%
Southeast Asian (Note: Statistic includes total responses of "Filipino" and "Southeast Asian" under visible minority section on census.)	16,485	14.24%
South Asian	16,085	13.9%
Latin American	2,685	2.32%
African	1,700	1.47%
Middle Eastern (Note: Statistic includes total responses of "West Asian" and "Arab" under visible minority section on census.)	1,685	1.46%
Indigenous	1,615	1.4%
Other/multiracial (Note: Statistic includes total responses of "Visible minority, n.i.e." and "Multiple visible minorities" under visible minority section on census.)	3,985	3.44%
Total responses	115,745	98.52%
Total population	117,485	100%
Notes: Totals greater than 100% due to multiple origin responses. Demographics based on 2022 Canadian federal electoral redistribution riding boundaries.

== Federal riding associations ==
Riding associations are the local branches of the national political parties:

Party	Association name	CEO	HQ City
Conservative	Vancouver Fraserview--South Burnaby Conservative Association	Coltin Benjamin Schaaf Lillico	Vancouver
Liberal	Vancouver Fraserview--South Burnaby Federal Liberal Association	Sukhwinder Pal Singh	Vancouver
New Democratic	Vancouver Fraserview--South Burnaby Federal NDP Riding Association	Lewis G. McIntyre	Burnaby

== History ==
=== Members of Parliament ===
Parliament	Years	Member	Party
Vancouver Fraserview—South Burnaby; Riding created from Burnaby South, New Westminster—Burnaby, and Vancouver South
45th	2025–present	Gregor Robertson	Liberal

== Electoral results ==
2025 Canadian federal election
** Preliminary results — Not yet official **
Party	Candidate	Votes	%	±%	Expenditures
Liberal	Gregor Robertson	27,117	52.30	+9.98	
Conservative	Avi Nayyar	18,500	35.68	+13.80	
New Democratic	Manoj Bhangu	5,080	9.80	–21.30	
Green	Alexander Dow	668	1.29	+0.28	
People's	Desiderio Magtanggol "Bonn" Reyes	482	0.93	–2.06	
Total valid votes/expense limit					
Total rejected ballots					
Turnout		51,847	61.87		
Eligible voters		83,800			
Liberal notional hold		Swing		–1.91	
Source: Elections Canada

2021 federal election redistributed results
Party	Vote	%
Liberal	18,352	42.32
New Democratic	13,485	31.10
Conservative	9,488	21.88
People's	1,298	2.99
Green	439	1.01
Others	305	0.70

== Student vote results ==
Results of the Canadian student vote.

=== 2025 ===
2025 Canadian federal election
Party	Candidate	Votes	%
Liberal	Gregor Robertson	725	38.24
Conservative	Avi Nayyar	459	24.21
New Democratic	Manoj Bhangu	383	20.20
Green	Alexander Dow	202	10.65
People's	Desiderio Magtanggol "Bonn" Reyes	127	6.70
Total valid votes		1,896	100.0
Source: Student Vote Canada
