= Michael Ableman =

American author, organic farmer, educator

- Occupations: Writer, educator, farmer

Michael Ableman is an American-Canadian author, organic farmer, educator, advocate for sustainable agriculture, and is considered one of the pioneers of the organic farming and urban agriculture movements.

Ableman is the founder of the Center for Urban Agriculture at Fairview Gardens in Goleta, California where he farmed for 20 years; co-founder and director of Sole Food Street Farms and the charity Cultivate Canada in Vancouver, British Columbia; and founder and director of the Center for Arts, Ecology and Agriculture based at his family home and farm on Salt Spring Island.

== Biography ==
Ableman originally intended to become a photographer. However, in 1972 he joined an agrarian commune east of Ojai, California where he was to eventually manage 100 acres (0.40 km^{2}) of pear and apple orchards. After a time managing a nursery on the coast north of Santa Barbara, in 1981 Ableman took a job grafting orange trees at Fairview Gardens. When the previous manager left, Ableman remained, "farm-sitting," until 2001. At its peak the farm served as an important community and education center and a national model for small-scale and urban agriculture, hosting as many as 5000 people per year for tours, classes, festivals, and apprenticeships. Under Ableman's leadership, the farm was saved from development and preserved under one of the earliest and most unusual active agricultural conservation easements of its type in the country.

A frequent speaker at conferences throughout North America, Ableman gave a plenary presentation on the future of farming at the Bioneers conference in 2005.

== Works ==
- Street Farm: Growing Food, Jobs, and Hope on the Urban Frontier. Chelsea Green (2016) ISBN 9781603586023
- Fields of Plenty: A Farmer's Journey in Search of Real Food and the People Who Grow It. Chronicle Books (2005). ISBN 978-0-8118-4223-5
- On Good Land: The Autobiography of an Urban Farmer. Chronicle Books (1998). ISBN 978-0-8118-1921-3
- From the Good Earth: A Celebration of Growing Food Around the World, with Cynthia Wisehart, Sam Bittman. Harry N. Abrams, Incorporated, (1993). ISBN 978-0-8109-2517-5

== See also ==
- Clara Whitehill Hunt
- Lawrence Fraser Abbott
- Adeline Pond Adams
