= Greenest City 2020 Action Plan =

Urban sustainability initiative for Vancouver

The Greenest City 2020 Action Plan (GCAP) is an urban sustainability initiative for Vancouver. Its primary mission is to ensure that Vancouver becomes the greenest city in the world by the year 2020. The GCAP originated based on the 2009 work of the Greenest City Action Team, a committee co-chaired by Vancouver mayor Gregor Robertson. The GCAP was approved by Vancouver city council in July 2011.

The GCAP consists of 10 primary goals that focus on 3 primary topics: carbon, waste, and ecosystems. Within each of the 10 goals, the plan establishes measurable targets and offers baseline data against which to compare those targets. It offers ‘highest priority actions’ and broader ‘key strategies’ to achieve the targets it sets out.

== Goals ==
The GCAP outlines the following 10 discrete goals:

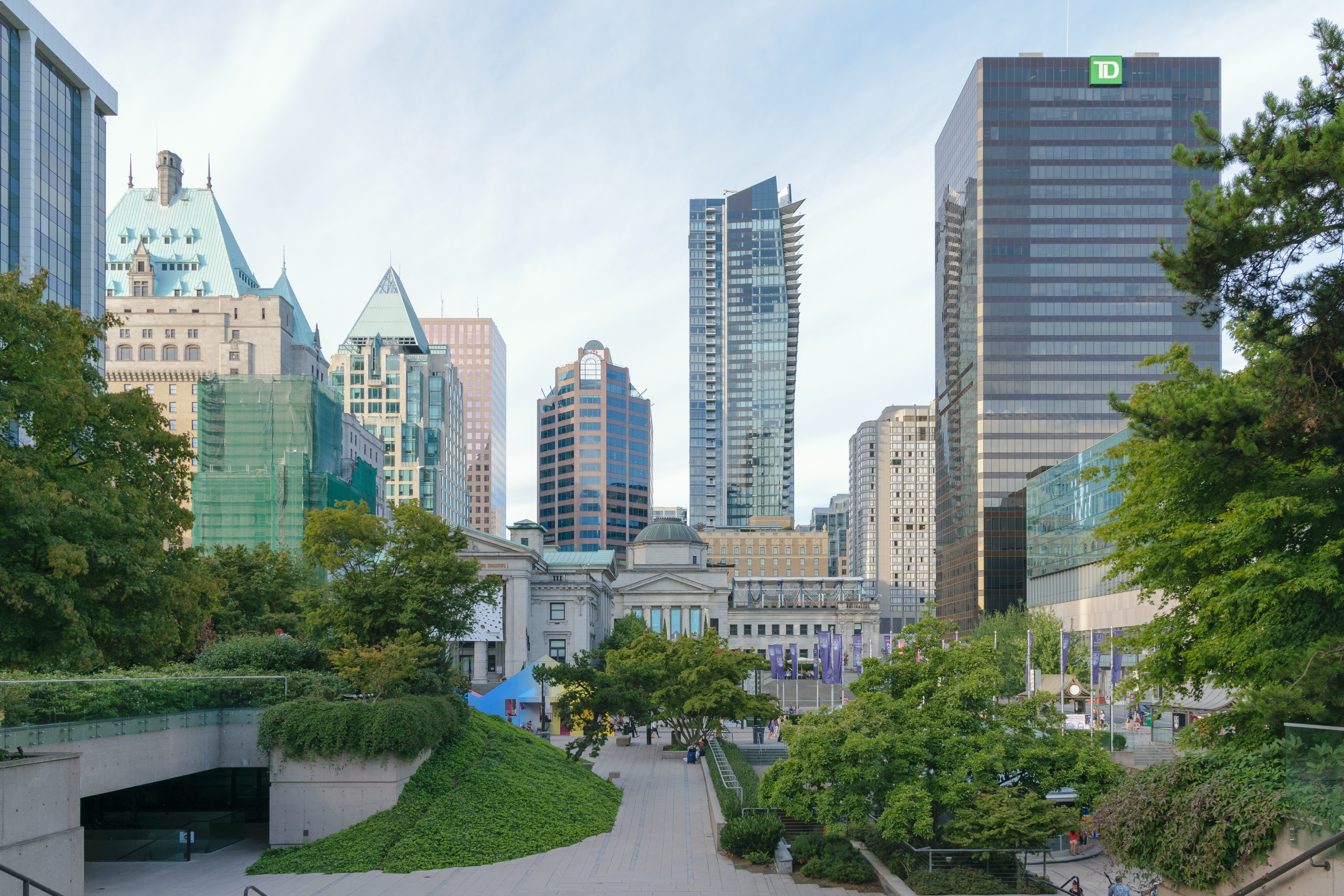
Greenery in Vancouver's downtown Robson Square

- Green economy: double the number of green jobs and businesses with green operations
- Climate leadership: require all new buildings built after 2020 to be carbon neutral
- Green buildings: reduce CO_{2} emissions in existing buildings by 20% over 2007 levels
- Green transportation: reduce driving and make the majority of trips by foot, bicycle, and public transit traffic
- Zero waste: reduce solid waste going to landfills to 50% of 2008 levels
- Access to nature: increase accessibility of green parks, greenways, and other green space, so that all Vancouver residents live within 5 minutes of these spaces
- Lighter footprint: reduce Vancouver's ecological footprint by 33% over 2006 levels
- Clean water: increase water quality and reduce water consumption per capita by 33% from 2006 levels
- Clean air: increase air quality, measured against Metro Vancouver and World Health Organization guidelines
- Local food: increase amount of locally grown food

== Current status ==
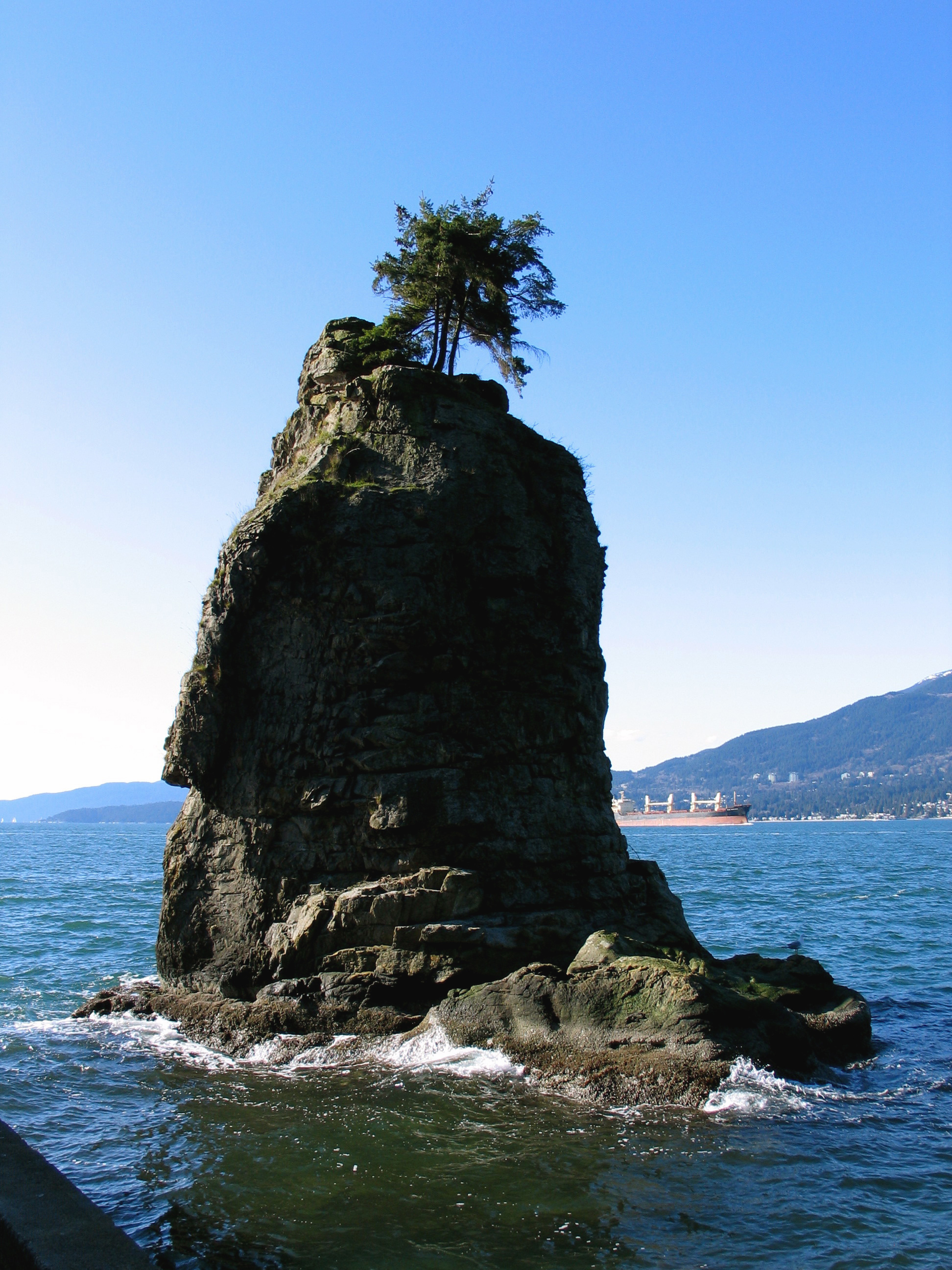
Siwash Rock, visible from the sea wall on the north end of Vancouver's Stanley Park

There have been many steps taken to reduce waste and recycle more in the city. Out of all the priority actions, 80% have already been completed. Many “beaches, shorelines and waterfronts throughout Vancouver” have been cleaned up and restored. “Greenhouse gas emissions (GHGs) have been reduced by 7% across the city” which is an 18% decrease per capita since 2007. Newly constructed buildings are now using 50% less energy than those built elsewhere in the province. Cycling and walking networks within the city have been expanded, with the addition of a 28 kilometer cycling path (the Vancouver Seawall) along the ocean.

Additionally, two million dollars have been funded to community-led projects for a greener Vancouver. The City of Vancouver also “opposed the Kinder Morgan pipeline, [to prevent] a sevenfold increase in oil tanker traffic in Vancouver’s harbor”, which would put the shoreline and climate at risk. Further, “the creation of a new coal export terminal on the Fraser River” was opposed by the city, which banned any future coal facilities from being built in Vancouver to protect residents from toxic dust and the planet from rapid climate change.

Currently, “about 76% of the waste created through the construction of new buildings or the demolition of old ones is recycled or in the case of wood, used for energy”; however, this is still far from “zero waste”. By fostering a closed-loop economy, which means using material like metal, wood and other materials in “a single direction”, they still need to be replaced with materials that can be reused for other purposes.

Establishing Neighbourhood Food Networks (NFNs) is another way that the city is working towards sustainable food consumption systems. Since the GCAP's implementation, there have been five grants that have funded NFNs in the City of Vancouver. The Greenest City Neighbourhood Grants program of 2010 and Social Responsibility Fund of 2011 are a few examples of funding that has been provided for projects on a variety of green initiatives such as gardening, workshops, and community kitchens.

In November 2013, cigarette recycling bins were placed around the city, becoming the first city to do so. The city claimed that cigarettes were the most littered item in the city as the reason for the rollout, as part of the Greenest City action plan. The collected items are sent to TerraCycle for recycling.

== Reception ==
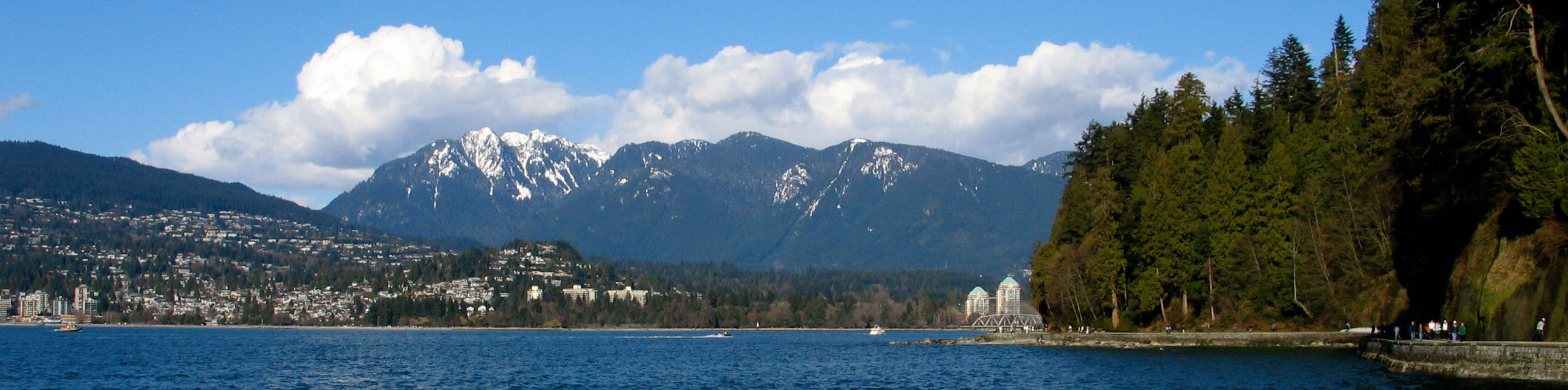
West Vancouver, seen from the ocean-side bicycle path in Vancouver's Stanley Park

=== Public input ===
In 2015, Vancouver sought input from the general public on the initiative. Some respondents emphasized that the action plan is not enough and that “we need to do more to protect what we have rather than react to what we’ve lost.” Thus, having an active and proactive approach is emphasized rather than a reactive approach. Former city councillor Fred Bass commented that to “save our ecosystems, we need to be heroic [as] we’re facing a real ecological emergency.” The public's main concern is that they want to see measurable and concrete results instead of objectives such as to “secure critical and sensitive habitats and environmental corridors”. The public wants to know how these objectives are being implemented and if they are being achieved. There needs to be doable actions and specific measures taken towards each goal without more development projects that would have adverse results of hurting the environment.

=== Support ===
Support for the initiative has come in the form of international recognition. In 2015, Vancouver won a C40 Cities award, given in recognition of cities that demonstrate world-leading sustainability initiatives. Vancouver was recognized as the third greenest city in the world according to the 2016 Global Green Economy Index, behind only Copenhagen and Stockholm.
