= Gregor Robertson (politician) =

Canadian politician (born 1964)

The Honourable Gregor Robertson PC MP
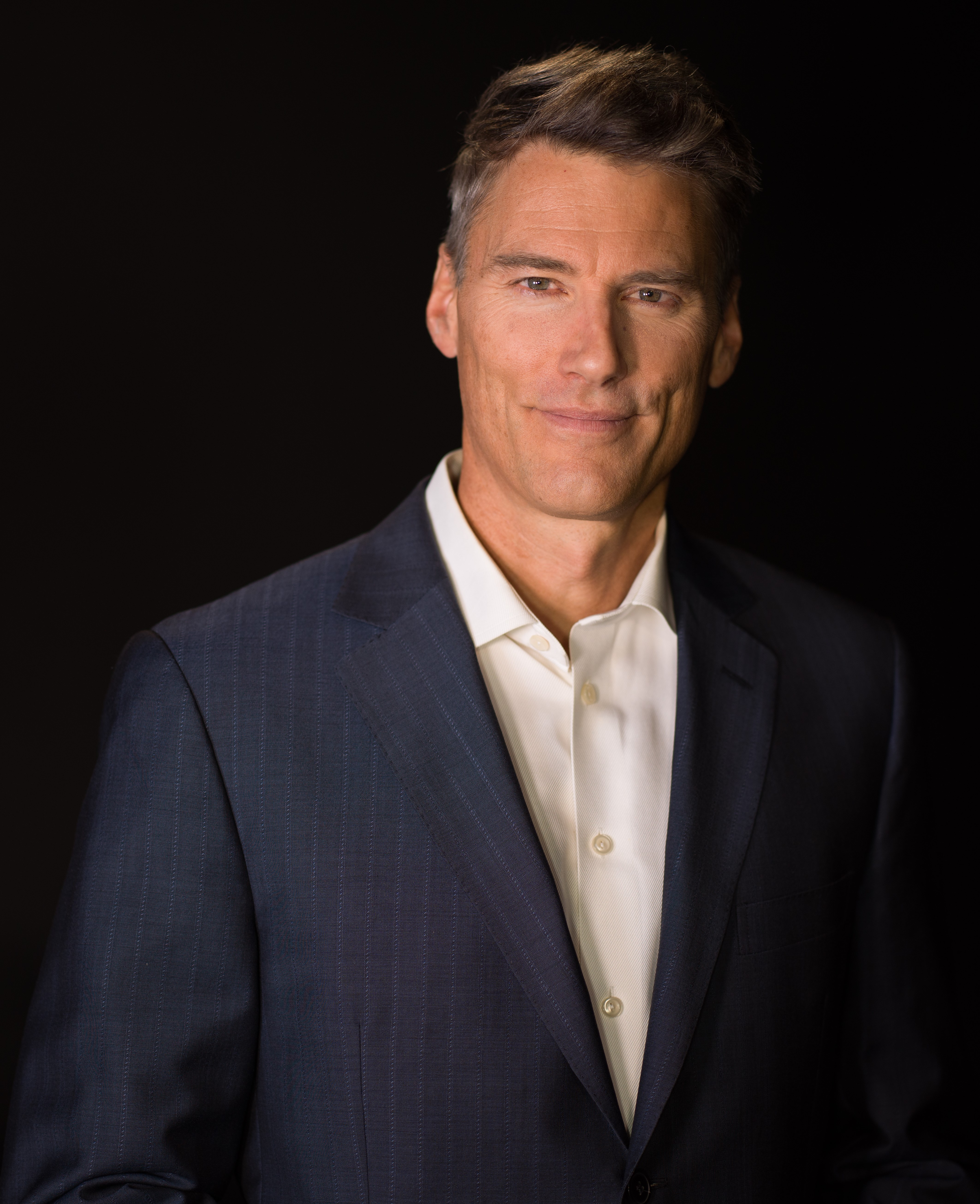
- Robertson in 2021

Minister of Housing and Infrastructure
- Incumbent
- Assumed office May 13, 2025
- Prime Minister: Mark Carney
- Preceded by: Nate Erskine-Smith

Minister responsible for Pacific Economic Development Canada
- Incumbent
- Assumed office May 13, 2025
- Prime Minister: Mark Carney
- Preceded by: Harjit Sajjan

Member of Parliament for Vancouver Fraserview—South Burnaby
- Incumbent
- Assumed office April 28, 2025
- Preceded by: Constituency established

39th Mayor of Vancouver
- In office December 8, 2008 – November 5, 2018
- Preceded by: Sam Sullivan
- Succeeded by: Kennedy Stewart

Member of the British Columbia Legislative Assembly for Vancouver-Fairview
- In office May 17, 2005 – July 15, 2008
- Preceded by: Gary Collins
- Succeeded by: Jenn McGinn

Personal details
- Born: Gregor Angus Bethune Robertson; September 18, 1964 (age 62) North Vancouver, British Columbia, Canada
- Party: Liberal (federal)
- Other political affiliations: Vision Vancouver (municipal); New Democratic (provincial)
- Spouses: Amy Oswald (div. 2014) Eileen Park Robertson (m. 2020)
- Children: 4
- Education: Colorado College; University of British Columbia (BA)
- Occupation: Businessman; politician

Gregor Angus Bethune Robertson PC MP (born September 18, 1964) is a Canadian politician and businessman, who has served as the Minister of Housing and Infrastructure since 2025. He served as the 39th mayor of Vancouver, British Columbia, from 2008 to 2018. As the longest consecutive serving mayor in Vancouver's history, Robertson and his team led the creation and implementation of the Greenest City 2020 Action Plan and spearheaded the city's first comprehensive Economic Action Strategy.

Robertson was elected to the position of mayor of Vancouver as part of the Vision Vancouver slate. Prior to that, he served as a Member of the Legislative Assembly for Vancouver-Fairview, as a member of the New Democratic Party of British Columbia, from 2005 until his resignation in 2008 to run for the mayoral position. On January 10, 2018, Robertson announced that he would not seek re-election after three terms in office.

On April 28, 2025, Robertson was elected Member of Parliament in Vancouver Fraserview—South Burnaby as the Liberal candidate for the 2025 Canadian federal election. He was then appointed to Cabinet by Prime Minister Mark Carney as the Minister of Housing, Infrastructure and Pacific Economic Development Canada.

== Background ==
Robertson was born in North Vancouver in 1964 to a family of Scottish descent. His father, John Robertson, was a lawyer with Russell & Dumoulin, a prominent Vancouver law firm, and his mother, Corneil Therrien, was a teacher. After his parents divorced, Robertson grew up partly in Portola Valley, near San Francisco with his mother, and later with his father in North Vancouver. In 1982, he graduated from Carson Graham Secondary School in North Vancouver and attended Colorado College and the University of British Columbia, graduating from the latter with a BA in English and Biology in 1986. After graduating, he intended to become a physician, but the University of British Columbia School of Medicine rejected his application. Robertson then completed Emergency Medical Technician (EMT/paramedic) training, but turned his career focus towards healthy food and nutrition.

He worked on a ranch as a cowboy in the Cariboo, restored a wooden sailboat and sailed across the Pacific for 18 months, accompanied by his then wife, Amy, whom he had met in Colorado. They settled in New Zealand, where he began farming as a trade. After turning 25, he returned to Canada, where he purchased land in Glen Valley near Fort Langley, and made his living as a farmer there.

Robertson later went on to co-found Happy Planet, a Vancouver-based company that produces and markets organic fruit and vegetable beverages and soups. He was named one of Canada's "Top 40 under 40" by The Globe and Mail. He was also a Tides Canada (public foundation) director from 2002 until 2004, when he entered politics with the provincial New Democratic Party.

He was elected to the BC Legislative Assembly in the 2005 election as a member of the British Columbia New Democratic Party having defeated the trade union leader Judy Darcy in a high-profile battle for the party's nomination. He then beat British Columbia Liberal Party's Virginia Greene in the general election. During his time as the MLA for Vancouver-Fairview, Robertson served as the Opposition Critic for Advanced Education, Small Business Critic and as the co-chair of the Caucus Climate Change Taskforce.

As of 2025, Robertson was a special envoy in the Coalition for High Ambition Multilevel Partnerships (CHAMP), as well as the global ambassador of Global Covenant of Mayors for Climate and Energy, the largest city alliance for climate leadership.

== Mayoral campaign and elections ==
In February 2008, Robertson announced that he would run for Mayor of Vancouver. In June 2008, Robertson secured the Vision Vancouver party's nomination as its mayoral candidate, defeating Raymond Louie and Allan De Genova. Robertson soon announced his resignation from the Legislative Assembly effective July 15, 2008. His main rival was Peter Ladner of the Non-Partisan Association.

He was elected by a solid margin in the 2008 municipal election. Seven of the ten seats on Vancouver City Council also went to Robertson's Vision Vancouver party. "It was a hard-fought campaign," he told supporters gathered at the Fairmont Hotel Vancouver, "but there is far more that unites us than divides us."

Robertson secured a landslide victory in the 2011 municipal election. He defeated Suzanne Anton of NPA by a margin of 18,853 votes, while Vision Vancouver won seven of the ten seats on the Vancouver City Council.

Robertson was re-elected to a third term in 2014, defeating Kirk LaPointe of NPA.

In January 2018, Robertson announced that he would not seek re-election in the fall election. His mayorship ended on 5 November 2018.

== Mayoral term (2008–2018) ==
=== Economic growth ===
In 2011, Robertson created the city's first Economic Action Strategy which led to creation of jobs in sectors such as green energy and digital media. During his mayoral tenure, Vancouver became the fastest-growing metropolitan economy in the country, according to the Conference Board of Canada. Vancouver's unemployment was down in six of the last seven years of his term; the unemployment rate of 4.5% in 2018 was one of the lowest in the country.

=== Action on homelessness and housing ===
On December 9, 2008, he announced low-barrier HEAT shelters to assist Vancouver's homeless citizens during an extremely cold winter, which were filled to capacity. On September 15, 2009, Vancouver city staff issued a report warning Robertson and the City Council that they should no longer expect the HEAT shelters to be funded after the 2009–2010 fiscal year. In 2011, by the end of his first mayoral term, more than 90 per cent of the homeless people in Vancouver were reportedly sleeping in shelters or other temporary spaces.

In 2014, he oversaw the creation of Vancouver Affordable Housing Agency, which was established to create housing units primarily for low to moderate-income households. A neighbourhood plan aimed to shape development of the Downtown Eastside was also approved. The plan was aimed to protect low-income residents of the area who were struggling to afford rent amidst a rise in cost of living.

In September 2017, the Government of British Columbia announced a funding commitment of $66 million towards Robertson's plan to build 600 units of temporary modular housing in Vancouver. In partnership with the BC Government, temporary modular homes were built within 18 months on empty or underutilized City-owned land, providing immediate relief to 600 people living without a home, as well as access to 24/7 supports, including life skills training and health services.

In 2018, an annual count recorded 2,181 homeless people in Vancouver, up from 1,576 at the beginning of his term in 2008. Robertson attributed this increase to a lack of support from provincial and federal governments. In addition, numbers released by B.C. Housing Ministry pointed to an influx of homeless people coming to British Columbia from other provinces. A 2016 study by Simon Fraser University found that 52% of the homeless people surveyed in Downtown Eastside had migrated there from outside Vancouver, up from 17% a decade ago.

The 12th annual Homeless Count in Vancouver held in 2018 saw a 2% increase in homeless residents since the 2017 count, compared with a 16% increase between 2016 and 2017. Of those counted in 2018, 659 were living on the street and 1,522 were living in shelters, compared to 537 street homeless and 1,601 sheltered in 2017. Fifty-two per cent of those counted reported being homeless for less than a year, showing the fluidity of homelessness year over year in Vancouver, and in 2017, the Homelessness Service's Outreach Team secured 850 homes for residents who were homeless or at risk of homelessness.

In an effort to address the impact of foreign buyers on Vancouver’s housing affordability crisis, Robertson began lobbying Premier Christy Clark in May 2015 to introduce luxury and speculation taxes and grant Vancouver the authority to impose a tax on vacant homes. In July 2016, Clark’s government introduced Bill 28, authorizing Vancouver to impose a vacant homes tax. At the same time, the province announced a 15% Foreign Buyers’ Tax on residential purchases by foreign nationals and foreign-controlled corporations in Metro Vancouver, effective August 2, 2016. In November 2016, Robertson and the Vision Council created and approved Canada's first vacancy tax, known as the Empty Homes Tax (EHT), which placed a 1% annual tax based on a property's assessed value if a residential property was left empty for more than six months.This was an attempt to encourage both offshore and local investors to sell or rent their vacant properties. EHT generated $30 million for the city’s affordable housing fund in its first year and more than $194 million by 2025. By the time Robertson left the mayor's office in 2018, the price of a single-family home on the city's east side was $1.5 million, up from $676,000 in 2008.

=== Greenest City Action Plan ===
On February 25, 2009, Robertson announced the members of the Greenest City Action Team in support of his campaign promise to make Vancouver the greenest city in the world by 2020. In April 2009, Robertson and the Greenest City Action Team released a report outlining quick-start recommendations to move aggressively on its green plan. The report focused on three key areas: jobs and the economy, greener communities, and protecting human health.

The Greenest City Action Plan (GCAP) was approved by the Vancouver City Council in 2011. The plan included 10 goals, including reduction of carbon emissions, development of the green economy, improvement in air and water quality, among others. Vancouver became the first city to regulate embodied carbon, and set a goal to eliminate fossil fuels and switch to 100% renewable energy by 2050. In 2013, Vancouver was named as the Global Earth Hour Capital by the World Wildlife Fund in recognition of the city's "actions on climate change and dedication to create a sustainable, vibrant urban environment." In 2016, Vancouver was recognized as the third greenest city in the world according to the Global Green Economy Index, behind only Copenhagen and Stockholm, and was also the top-ranked North American city in the Arcadis Sustainable City Index.

As part of GCAP, Vancouver also focused on waste management by turning organic waste into compost material which was then sold to gardeners. The city captured methane at landfills to heat greenhouses. Vancouver also became the first city in North America to heat homes using thermal energy extracted from sewage and wastewater, which reportedly reduced greenhouse gas emissions by 65% in the False Creek neighbourhood. Another focus area of the GCAP was reducing emissions from buildings, a major source of greenhouse gases in Vancouver. In 2016, the city introduced the Zero Emissions Building Plan with the aim to make all new constructions zero emissions buildings by 2030, while reducing emissions from existing buildings through the transition from fossil fuels to renewable sources and the implementation of improved building envelopes.

=== Transportation and livability ===
==== Cycling ====
Robertson and his team led the charge on cycling infrastructure, transforming Vancouver into one of the world's most liveable cities.

Cycling had been growing in popularity in Vancouver, and the desire of its citizens to cycle for at least some of their trips had been growing for decades; however little was done by previous administrations. In July 2009, the Burrard Bridge bicycle lane trial was initiated to determine whether creating a new protected bike lane was a viable solution to increase the safety and comfort of people cycling and walking while still maintaining an effective flow of traffic. During his mayorship, the city's flagship project was the Seaside Greenway, running from downtown Vancouver to Jericho Beach. This active transportation corridor was created by repurposing one lane of automobile traffic from the Burrard Bridge as well as blocking through vehicular traffic from the prestigious Point Grey Road.

Over the course of his tenure as mayor, protected bike lanes were established and the Central Valley Greenway bike corridor was opened from Vancouver to New Westminster through Burnaby. In 2015, the city achieved its goal of having 50% of all trips made by sustainable modes—walking, cycling, or transit—five years ahead of the original 2020 target, aided by a network of bike lanes created between 2009 and 2014. Between 2006 and 2016, the city reported an 85% increase in bicycle ridership, a 32% rise in transit commuters, and a 26% growth in the number of people walking to work.

The improved cycling infrastructure, coupled with the launch of Mobi bike share service in 2016, led to record bicycle ridership in 2018, with Vancouver being dubbed as a "North American cycling leader".

==== SkyTrain ====
Robertson was a strong supporter of Cambie Street merchants and spoke regularly about hardships from the Canada Line construction. He called the handling of the rail line construction an "injustice". In 2009, a Cambie Street merchant was awarded $600,000 in a lawsuit for damages caused by Canada Line construction, with Robertson providing testimony; but this decision was overturned by the B.C. Court of Appeal in 2012. On the Canada Line opening day of August 17, 2009, Robertson said Greater Vancouver needed more rapid transit but the Canada Line was a "great start" and that he was a "Johnny-come-lately" to the project.

In 2016, Robertson helped secure funding for the Broadway subway extension of the Millennium Line, when he was also chair of the Mayors’ Council on Regional Transportation. The project would add six stations from Glen Drive to Arbutus Street along Broadway, aiming to reduce congestion on the 99 B-Line, the busiest bus route across Canada and the United States.

=== Bylaw changes ===
In preparation for the 2010 Winter Olympics in July 2009, the Vancouver Council approved several temporary bylaw changes—including security checkpoints, closed-circuit cameras, prohibition of "disturbance or nuisance interfering with the enjoyment of entertainment on city land by other persons", and prohibition of commercial flyers at celebration sites—which were controversial for some civil liberties advocates who argued that they "make it more difficult to exercise [the] fundamental constitutional rights to free speech, peaceful assembly and free expression." As part of the changes city manager Penny Ballem, an unelected official, was given special powers that were referred to by Coalition of Progressive Electors councillor Ellen Woodsworth as "wide open carte blanche." Robertson defended council's position, explaining the temporary bylaw changes were necessary given what Vancouver was required to implement as the host city. According to Robertson, "It is our ultimate obligation to ensure the safety and security of people who are in our city and this, I think, addresses a lot of the concerns proactively on that level while respecting the Charter of Rights and Freedoms. This is a temporary set of changes we're putting it in place for a special event."

Robertson also implemented a bylaw in April 2014 that prevented homeowners from cutting trees down on their own private property. The bylaw was proposed due to the rapid reduction in tree cover in the City of Vancouver.

=== Vancouver charter amendment ===
On January 12, 2009, Robertson requested an amendment to the Vancouver Charter to allow the city to borrow $458 million to fund the completion of the 2010 Olympic Village in False Creek without seeking approval from taxpayers in an election-day plebiscite. Robertson said this was due to extraordinary circumstances. The amendment was passed on January 18, 2009, in an emergency session of the Legislative Assembly of British Columbia.

=== Vancouver Stanley Cup riot ===
On June 15, 2011, the 2011 Vancouver Stanley Cup riot occurred after a Vancouver Canucks loss in game seven of the Stanley Cup Final. Robertson attributed the situation to "a small group of troublemakers". Bob Whitelaw, author of a report into the 1994 Vancouver Stanley Cup riot, indicated that authorities had made several mistakes in the planning for the crowd—among them allowing parked cars near the screens and leaving newspaper boxes nearby which could be used as projectiles. It was later claimed by Vancouver Police Chief Jim Chu that Bob Whitelaw was not a contributor to the final report, and that all recommendations of the final report had been followed. Robertson admitted to not having read the 1994 report. Suzanne Anton dubbed the riot as "Robertson's Riot", a moniker which was picked up by some media outlets.

=== Indigenous rights ===
In 2014, Vancouver declared itself to be the first "City of Reconciliation", summarizing the principles to reconcile with Musqueam, Squamish and Tsleil-Waututh indigenous communities. Robertson acknowledged that the city was on the unceded homelands of the First Nations. Robertson and Vancouver City Council established regular meetings with Musqueam, Squamish and Tsleil-Waututh councils to implement reconciliation actions jointly.

Robertson and the city council strongly opposed the Trans Mountain pipeline and took legal action with the three nations in fighting against its development, travelling to Ottawa with the BC First Nations Chiefs to petition Federal leaders.

In 2017, the city council permanently raised the flags of the three host nations in the council chambers for the first time in the city's history. They also donated a burial site back to the Musqueam community and protected the site from commercial development as part of their ongoing commitments as a "City of Reconciliation".

During the 2013 Walk of Reconciliation, over 70,000 people marched with Robertson, City Council, and thousands of city leaders/organizations in heavy rain in support of indigenous rights, while the Truth and Reconciliation Commission of Canada was hosted by the city.

=== Other investments ===
Between 2009 and 2011, the city exceeded its target of 300 childcare spaces by 153. And during his 2011 mayoral campaign, Robertson set a larger goal of setting up 500 affordable childcare spaces over the course of his second term. The budget surplus of $5 million in 2012 was partially invested into development of childcare spaces, the largest increase in childcare investment in Vancouver's history. In 2014, the city announced that 599 spaces had been built or committed to since 2012, with a total investment of $62 million going into the plan. By 2018, 1,064 additional childcare spaces had been committed in line with the 2015–2018 Capital Plan to create 1,000 new childcare spaces.

Robertson advocated for drug decriminalization during the opioid crisis. The city invested in overdose prevention sites, facilitating supervised injection and clean exchange of needles, which resulted in a decrease in overdose deaths.

== Post-mayoral career ==
=== Global Covenant of Mayors ===
In 2019, Robertson was appointed as the global ambassador of Global Covenant of Mayors for Climate & Energy, the largest city alliance for climate leadership with over 13,000 cities worldwide tackling the climate crisis and energy challenges.

In 2022, Robertson was named on Business Insider's inaugural Climate Action 30, a list of "30 top global leaders working toward climate solutions".

=== Coalition for High Ambition Multilevel Partnerships ===
In 2024, the Global Covenant of Mayors, with support from Bloomberg Philanthropies, appointed Robertson as a special envoy in the Coalition for High Ambition Multilevel Partnerships (CHAMP).

== Federal politics ==
=== 2025 federal election ===
On March 23, 2025, Robertson announced his candidacy as the Liberal Party candidate for the newly established Vancouver Fraserview—South Burnaby riding in the 2025 federal election. On April 28, 2025, Robertson won the seat with 52.3% of the vote, defeating Conservative candidate Avi Nayyar. The Liberal Party recorded its best performance in the province in decades.

=== Carney government ===
On May 13, 2025, he was appointed by Prime Minister Mark Carney as the Minister of Housing and Infrastructure and also Minister responsible for Pacific Economic Development Canada. Robertson thus became one of the few Canadian politicians to have served at all three levels of government.

In September 2025, Build Canada Homes (BCH), a new federal housing agency overseen by Robertson, was launched with $13 billion in funding towards affordable housing programs focused on public lands and modular construction. By June 2026, BCH reported commitments for more than 11,000 new homes, and signed agreements with British Columbia, Quebec, New Brunswick, Nova Scotia, Nunavut, Yukon, and the City of Ottawa to build affordable homes. BCH is part of the federal government's strategy to accelerate housing construction and build 500,000 homes annually. In October 2025, Robertson stated this goal is ambitious and could take a decade to achieve. Robertson does not believe housing prices need to decrease and sees supply as the main issue.

In November 2025, Robertson announced the Build Communities Strong Fund (BCSF) to support housing-enabling infrastructure, including transit, roads, hospitals, colleges, and community facilities. BCSF was launched in April 2026 with $51 billion earmarked over 10 years, followed by $3 billion annually thereafter. In June 2026, the federal government announced a partnership between BCSF and Canada Public Transit Fund (CPTF) to invest $10 billion in community infrastructure in Quebec over 10 years.

In March 2026, a partnership between Canada and Ontario to remove HST and reduce development charges was announced. At that time, Robertson stated, “Our government’s key investments in infrastructure and housing will help remove barriers to homebuilding and home ownership.”

In June 2026, a joint federal-provincial plan, funded through BCH, was announced to acquire and convert more than 2,200 unsold, vacant condominium units in British Columbia into affordable rent-to-own homes. Robertson defended the plan against criticism that it amounted to a developer bailout, arguing that the units would be purchased below market value and would help families get into homes more quickly.

== Family and personal life ==
Robertson was married to Amy Oswald, whom he met at Colorado College, and they have three children. On July 5, 2014, the Robertsons announced their separation in a joint statement.

Robertson reportedly dated singer Wanting Qu from January 2015 to May 2017.

In 2020, Robertson married broadcast journalist and communications expert Eileen Park. She was director of communications at the Office of the Mayor of Portland from 2018 to 2020, and won a Cannes World Film Festival award for her short film on Lynda Shioya in 2021. Their wedding took place at Stanley Park in Vancouver, paying tribute to their respective Scottish and Korean ancestry by wearing the Clan Robertson tartan and a Park family emblem. When news of their interracial marriage was published in Vogue magazine, Eileen, a Korean-American, was targeted with racist and misogynist hate. She spoke out about her personal experiences with racism while working in media and government.

Robertson is a tuba player; he and his former MLA colleague Nicholas Simons performed on country-punk musician Slim Milkie's 2010 album Silverado.

He is a distant relative of Norman Bethune. His grandmother was a first cousin of the Canadian doctor, a hero of the mainland Second Sino-Japanese War.

== Electoral record ==
=== Federal elections ===
2025 Canadian federal election: Vancouver Fraserview—South Burnaby
Party	Candidate	Votes	%	±%	Expenditures
Liberal	Gregor Robertson	27,117	52.30	+9.98	$102,872.82
Conservative	Avi Nayyar	18,500	35.68	+13.80	$127,906.40
New Democratic	Manoj Bhangu	5,088	9.81	–21.29	$70,928.95
Green	Alexander Dow	658	1.27	+0.26	none listed
People's	Desiderio Magtanggol "Bonn" Reyes	482	0.93	–2.06	$2,141.13
Total valid votes/expense limit		51,845	99.28	–	$129,751.64
Total rejected ballots		375	0.72	–	
Turnout		52,220	61.81	–	
Eligible voters		84,489			
Liberal notional hold		Swing		–1.91	
Source: Elections Canada

=== Provincial elections ===
2005 British Columbia general election: Vancouver-Fairview
Party	Candidate	Votes	%	Expenditures
New Democratic	Gregor Robertson	13,009	46.59	$138,500
Liberal	Virginia Greene	12,114	43.39	$159,138
Green	Hamdy El-Rayes	2,479	8.88	$1,468
Sex	Patrick Gallagher Clark	121	0.43	$100
Central Party	Scott Yee	102	0.37	$110
Work Less	Malcolm Janet Mary van Delst	95	0.34	$100
Total valid votes		27,920	100	
Total rejected ballots		206	0.74	
Turnout		28,126	60.64	

=== Municipal elections ===
==== 2014 election for mayor ====
2014 Vancouver municipal election: Mayor
Party	Candidate	Votes	%	Elected
Vision	Gregor Robertson	83,529	45.97	✓
NPA	Kirk LaPointe	73,443	40.42	
COPE	Meena Wong	16,791	9.24	
Independent	Bob Kasting	1,682	0.93	
Independent	Mike Hansen	714	0.39	
Independent	Jeff Hill	611	0.34	
Independent	Tim Ly	556	0.31	
Stop Party	Meynard Aubichon	508	0.28	
Independent	Cherryse Kaur Kaiser	492	0.27	
Independent	Colin Shandler	459	0.25	
Total valid votes		178, 786	100.00	
Vision hold		Swing		–7.20

==== 2011 election for mayor ====
2011 Vancouver municipal election: Mayor
Party	Candidate	Votes	%	Elected
Vision	Gregor Robertson	77,005	53.17	✓
NPA	Suzanne Anton	58,152	40.15	
NSV	Randy Helten	4,007	2.77	
Vancouver Citizen's Voice	Gerry McGuire	1,195	0.83	
Independent	Sam Pelletier	443	0.31	
Independent	Darrell Zimmerman	426	0.29	
Independent	Dubgee	419	0.29	
Independent	Robin Lawrance	353	0.24	
Independent	Victor B. Paquette	333	0.23	
Independent	Lloyd Alan Cooke	310	0.21	
Independent	Menard Caissy	288	0.20	
Independent	Gölök Zoltán Buday	268	0.19	

==== 2008 election for mayor ====
Candidate Name	Party affiliation	Votes	% of votes	Elected
Gregor Robertson	Vision Vancouver	67,598	54.39%	X
Peter Ladner	Non-Partisan Association	48,794	39.26%	
Betty Krawczyk	Work Less Party of British Columbia	1,346	1.08%	
Marc Emery	Independent	1,119	0.90%	
Scott Yee	Independent	942	0.31%	
Patrick Britten	Nude Garden Party	695	0.76%	
Jeff Kuah	Independent	600	0.48%	
Angel L. Jimenez	Independent	320	0.26%	
Leon Kaplan	Independent	299	0.24%	
Bill Ritchie	Independent	252	0.20%	
Joe Hatoum	Independent	241	0.19%	
Gölök Z. Buday	Independent	172	0.14%	
Menard D. Caissey	Independent	137	0.11%	
N. Bur Maxwell	Independent	125	0.10%	

Order of precedence
Preceded by Eleanor Olszewski as Member of the Cabinet	Order of Precedence of Canada as Member of the Cabinet	Succeeded by Maninder Sidhu as Member of the Cabinet
