= Vancouver Charter =

Provincial statute in British Columbia, Canada

Legislative Assembly of British Columbia
- Citation: Vancouver Charter, SBC 1953, c. 55
- Passed: 1953

Repeals
- Vancouver Incorporation Act, 1921

Summary
- Incorporation documents of the City of Vancouver
- Status: In force

The Vancouver Charter is a provincial statute that incorporates the City of Vancouver, British Columbia, Canada. The legislation was passed in 1953 and supersedes the Vancouver Incorporation Act, 1921. It grants the city different powers than other communities in the province, which are governed by the Local Government Act.

== Additional powers ==
Some of the additional powers and provisions provided by the Vancouver Charter include:

- The ability to borrow on its own authority without the approval of the Municipal Finance Authority / Metro Vancouver Regional District.
- A separately elected park board
- Statutory immunity in relation to building regulation both with respect to plan checking and building permit issuance as well as with respect to building inspections.
- The authority to prohibit business or business activities
- Unique planning and land-use tools, including the power to delegate to the Director of Planning
- The authority to impose specialized development levies.

== History ==
=== Previous legislation ===
The city was first incorporated on April 6, 1886, under the Vancouver Incorporation Act, 1886. The act limited voting rights to men who owned property at least the age of 21, and women who were single, divorced, or widowed, over the age of 21 and owned property. The act also forbade women from sitting as the mayor or as aldermen. The act also stated that "No Chinaman or Indian shall be entitled to vote in any municipal election."

The incorporation act was repealed and replaced in 1900 and 1921 prior to the introduction of the Vancouver Charter.

=== Olympic amendments ===
On January 12, 2009, Vancouver's mayor Gregor Robertson requested an amendment to the charter to allow the city to borrow $458 million to fund the completion of the 2010 Olympic Village in False Creek without seeking approval from taxpayers in an election-day plebiscite. Robertson said this was due to extraordinary circumstances. The amendment was passed on January 18, 2009, in an emergency session of the Legislative Assembly of British Columbia.

=== 2024 amendments ===
The provincial government passed two acts in 2024 to amend the Vancouver Charter.

The first bill, the Vancouver Charter Amendment Act, 2024, recognized First Nations as a level government that qualified for exemptions from the city's development fee structure for social housing projects.

The second bill, the Vancouver Charter Amendment Act (No. 2), 2024, updated the charter to more closely align with the Local Government Act which governs all other municipalities in the province. Changes included requiring the city to adopt a city-wide official development plan (ODP) and banning public hearings for residential rezonings that conform to the ODP. These changes were introduced to streamline the approval process for building new housing within the city.
