= Gabor Maté =

Canadian physician (born 1944)

Gabor Maté CM
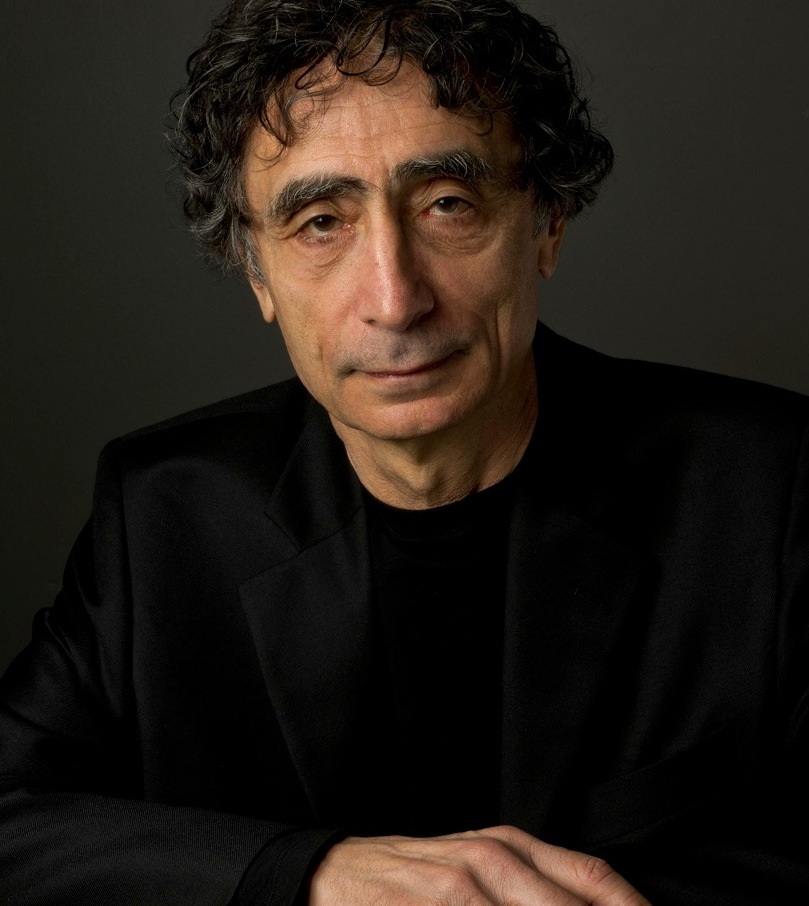
- Maté in 2013
- Born: January 1944 (age 82); Budapest, Hungary
- Citizenship: Canada
- Education: University of British Columbia (BA, MD)
- Spouse: Rae Maté (m. 1969)
- Children: 3, including Aaron Maté, Daniel Maté
- Scientific career
- Fields: Substance dependence; ADHD; Psychology
- Website: drgabormate.com

Gabor Maté CM (/ˈɡɑːbɔːr ˈmɑːteɪ/ GAH-bor MAH-tay; born January 1944) is a Canadian physician and author. He has worked in family practices and specializes in childhood development and trauma, including long-term effects on physical and mental health, such as autoimmune diseases, cancer, attention deficit hyperactivity disorder (ADHD), and addiction.

Maté's approach to addiction emphasizes the role of trauma in the development of substance use disorders, aiming to address underlying emotional pain as part of recovery. He has written five books exploring topics such as ADHD, stress, developmental psychology, and addiction. Some commentators have raised concerns about the scope and evidentiary basis of his claims.

== Early life ==
Maté was born in Budapest, Hungary, in 1944 to a Jewish family. His maternal grandparents, Josef Lövi and Hannah Lövi, who came from the town of Košice in modern eastern Slovakia, were killed in Auschwitz when he was five months old. His aunt disappeared during the war, and his father endured forced labour at the hands of the Nazi Party. When he was one year old, Maté's mother put him in the care of a stranger for over five weeks to save his life. Maté felt abandoned by his mother and, upon their reunion, wouldn't look at her for several days. Maté has said that the trauma of "abandonment, rage, and despair" still shapes his adult life, triggering similar conflicts he interprets as threats of abandonment—especially in his marriage.

In 1956, the Maté family emigrated to Canada. He was a student during the Vietnam War era in the late 1960s and graduated with a B.A. from the University of British Columbia in Vancouver.

== Career ==
After working as a high school English and literature teacher for several years, Maté returned to the University of British Columbia to obtain his M.D. in general family practice in 1977.

Maté ran a private family practice in East Vancouver, British Columbia, for over 20 years. He was the medical coordinator of the Palliative Care Unit at Vancouver Hospital for seven years.

For twelve years, Maté was the staff physician for the Portland Hotel Society (PHS), a supportive housing nonprofit organization originally based in Vancouver's Downtown Eastside. He regularly visited tenants in their rooms at the society's various housing projects. A majority of his patients had co-occurring mental health and substance use issues, in addition to chronic health concerns such as HIV.

Working alongside PHS founder and Canadian nurse Liz Evans, Maté helped develop and advance harm reduction and housing first initiatives supported by the organization, including needle exchange and supervised injection programs. He was recognized for prescribing the opioid agonist methadone without requiring or encouraging patients to participate in treatment programs or therapy sessions. Furthermore, he did not suspend a patient's methadone prescription if they tested positive for illicit opioids. He described his experiences working at PHS and treating people with substance use disorders in his 2009 book, In the Realm of Hungry Ghosts: Close Encounters with Addiction. In this book, he discusses forms of trauma experienced by people with addictions, their drug abuse as a coping mechanism, and how their experiences of abuse and neglect, absent coping skills, influence behaviour and decision-making later in life.

In 2008, Maté received national media attention when he defended the physicians working at Insite, a legally supervised injection facility, after federal Minister of Health Tony Clement criticized them as unethical.

In 2010, Maté became interested in the traditional Amazonian plant medicine ayahuasca and its potential for treating addictions. He partnered with a Peruvian Shipibo ayahuasquero (traditional shamanic healer) and began leading multi-day retreats for addiction treatment. Some of these retreats are hosted in a Coast Salish First Nations community that were the subject of an observational study by the University of Victoria and the University of British Columbia. Preliminary results showed that participants had statistically significant (p<0.05) improvements in some psychological measures and reductions in problematic substance use, suggesting that Maté's claims of therapeutic efficacy may be well-founded. However, when the Canadian Federal Government learned about Maté's work with ayahuasca in 2011, Health Canada threatened to refer the matter to the Canadian police for his use of the illegal drug.

== Writings and views ==
=== Medicine ===
In his books and lectures, Maté has emphasized the role of biopsychosocial aspects of pathology and the role of psychological trauma and stress. He underlines the importance of relationships and social attachment for learning and health. His ideas are consistent with a trauma-informed care framework.

Maté defines addiction as the use of any behaviour or substance to relieve pain in the short term that leads to negative consequences in the long term. He asserts that without addressing the root cause of the pain, a person may try to stop but will ultimately crave further relief and be prone to relapse. By this definition, many things in modern culture have the potential to become addictive, such as gambling, sex, food, work, social media, drugs, pornography, and computer games. He argues the "war on drugs" punishes addicts and entrenches addiction more deeply, as studies show that stress is the biggest driver of addictive relapse and behaviour. He says a system that marginalizes, ostracizes, and institutionalizes people in facilities with no care and easy access to drugs only worsens the problem.

In a live-streamed interview with Prince Harry in March 2023, Maté diagnosed the prince publicly with PTSD, ADHD, anxiety, and depression, based on his conversation with him and reading his autobiography, Spare. During the chat, Maté told Prince Harry that he had diagnosed him with ADD after reading through his book and hearing about his life experiences. Mental health experts criticized the exchange as unorthodox and irresponsible, noting that formal psychiatric diagnoses require structured clinical evaluation rather than public interviews or book reviews.

==== Criticisms ====
Stanton Peele, psychologist and psychotherapist, disagrees with Maté's notion of "tracing every case of addiction back to childhood trauma." Peele writes that Maté, whom he still admired for his work with Insite, where he also had worked, offers "a reductionist vision of addiction".

James C. Coyne, a professor at the University of Pennsylvania, suggested that Maté "urges us to abandon what has evolved to be evidence-based solutions to health and social problems," although conceding that "overspecialization in research and clinical practice is an important issue". This is echoed by Vincenzo Di Nicola, professor at the University of Montreal, who wrote that while many of his views are acceptable and based on "well-trod ground", some of his work is not evidence-based.

Nick Haslam, of the University of Melbourne, found "Maté's focus on trauma as the singular primary cause of ill health is unbalanced".

=== Israel and Palestine ===
In July 2014, Maté published an opinion piece titled "Beautiful Dream of Israel Has Become a Nightmare" in which he argued that Israeli policies were incompatible with a just peace and that the situation in Gaza could only be understood within its broader context. He drew comparisons between Gaza and the Warsaw Ghetto, highlighting what he described as a severe imbalance of power.

In November 2023, Maté was interviewed by broadcaster Piers Morgan, during which he stated that he had cried daily for two weeks following his visit to the Occupied Territories during the First Intifada. He called for an end to the occupation and persecution of Palestinians and for the return of land occupied since 1967.

== Personal life ==
In 1969, Maté married artist and fellow UBC graduate Rae Maté (born 1948). Together, they have three children, including journalist Aaron Maté. In 2026, Maté endorsed Avi Lewis in that year's federal NDP leadership race.

== Awards ==
- 2009: Hubert Evans Prize for Literary Non-Fiction for In the Realm of Hungry Ghosts: Close Encounters with Addiction.
- 2011: the Civic Merit Award of the City of Vancouver "for his extensive work on addiction treatment and his contributions to understanding mental health and youth related to addiction, stress and childhood development".
- 2018: member of the Order of Canada.
- 2023: Vine Awards for Canadian Jewish Literature for the book The Myth of Normal, which he co-authored with his son Daniel. The jury praised the book's accessible style and broad scope on health and culture.

== Books ==
- Maté, Gabor (1999). Scattered Minds: the origins and healing of attention deficit disorder. Toronto: A.A. Knopf. ISBN 978-0-676-97145-3. OCLC 1351186533.
- Maté, Gabor (2003). When the Body Says No: The Cost of Hidden Stress. Toronto: A.A. Knopf. ISBN 978-1-78504-222-5. OCLC 1079174018.
- Maté, Gabor; Neufeld, Gordon (2004). Hold on to Your Kids: Why Parents Need to Matter More Than Peers. Toronto: A.A. Knopf. ISBN 978-0-307-36196-7. OCLC 1079174018.
- Maté, Gabor (2008). In the Realm of Hungry Ghosts: Close Encounters with Addiction. Toronto: A.A. Knopf. ISBN 978-1-78504-220-1.
- Maté, Gabor; Maté, Daniel (2022). The Myth of Normal: Trauma, Illness and Healing in a Toxic Culture. Toronto: A.A. Knopf Canada. ISBN 978-0-593-08389-5. OCLC 1443839870.

== Films and videos ==
- The Power of Connection. Wholehearted. 2020.
- A Masterclass for Healers. Wholehearted. 2020.
- Healing Trauma & Addiction. Wholehearted. 2020.
- Benazzo, Maurizio; Benazzo, Zaya (2021). Wisdom of Trauma. Science & Nonduality.
- Joseph, Peter (2011). Zeitgeist: Moving Forward.
- Joe Rogan (2022). Joe Rogan Experience #1869 (interview/podcast). The Joe Rogan Experience.
- Drunk on Too Much Life (Documentary). 2021.
- Why do some people become addicts and not others? (Interview). BBC Ideas. 2022.
- Gabor Maté (2022). This Is Why You Feel LOST & UNHAPPY In Life! (Change Everything) (Interview/Podcast). Interviewed by Bilyeu, Tom. Impact Theory.
- The Power of Connection & The Myth of Normal (Video Special). Wholehearted. 2022.
- Asher Penn (director) (2023). Physician, Heal Thyself (Documentary feature).

== See also ==
- Holocaust survivors and descendants supporting Palestine
- Hedy Epstein – a pro-Palestine Holocaust survivor
- Norman Finkelstein – a pro-Palestine child of Holocaust survivors
