= Allan Seckel =

Canadian lawyer and government official

Allan Paul Seckel is a Canadian lawyer and government official. He serves in leadership positions with the BC Housing Management Commission, the Insurance Corporation of British Columbia (ICBC), Legal Aid BC, TransLink, and WorkSafeBC. He previously served as CEO of Doctors of BC and board chair of Covenant House Vancouver.

Seckel oversaw the process of amalgamating British Columbia's health regulatory colleges for the BC Ministry of Health under the Health Professions Act, and was subsequently appointed Public Chair of the resulting College of Complementary Health Professionals of British Columbia and College of Health and Care Professionals of British Columbia.

== History ==
=== Education ===
Seckel received a Bachelor of Arts in economics and commerce from Simon Fraser University, subsequently studying law at the University of Victoria. He then attended Gonville & Caius College at the University of Cambridge as a Commonwealth Scholar.

=== Career ===
Seckel served as a law clerk to Chief Justice of Nathaniel Nemetz from 1983 to 1984 before beginning his practice as a litigation lawyer. Starting in 1998, Seckel began co-authoring an annual series called "BC Supreme Court Rules Annotated" published by Thomson Reuters. He then worked as Deputy Attorney General for British Columbia from 2003 to 2009, and was designated as Queen's Council before subsequently becoming Cabinet Secretary, head of the BC Public Service Agency, and Deputy Minister to Premier Gordon Campbell from 2009 to 2011. Seckel was dismissed from his position by incoming premier Christy Clark, receiving a $550,000 severance package.

On June 7, 2011, Seckel registered as a lobbyist for the British Columbia Medical Association (BCMA), which later became Doctors of BC. He was announced as the new CEO of the BCMA on October 11, 2011, succeeding Mark Schonfeld, and taking over duties effective October 31, 2011. From June 2012 – June 2019, he served as a member of the Telus Vancouver and Coastal Community Board of the TELUS Friendly Future Foundation.

In early 2014, the BCMA changed its name to Doctors of BC. According to Seckel, this was done to address public confusion about the organization's existence and its acronym.

Seckel was a member of the Deputy Minister Advisory Panel on Criminal Legal Aid for the Department of Justice Canada from 2013 to 2014. From May 2017 – June 2018, Seckel served as Chair of the Mobility Pricing Independent Commission for TransLink and the Metro Vancouver Mayors’ Council on Regional Transportation.

==== COVID-19 ====
Following the declaration of the COVID-19 pandemic in British Columbia, in April 2020, Attorney General David Eby appointed Seckel to chair a Cross-Jurisdictional Technical Advisory Group to assist the provincial court system amidst public health restrictions. On June 2, 2020, Seckel and Doctors of BC President Kathleen Ross published a statement condemning recent acts of racism and violence in the United States. On September 21, 2020, Seckel was appointed as an alternate member to the Medical Services Commission of British Columbia.

Seckel was appointed to the board of directors of the Insurance Corporation of British Columbia (ICBC) on April 22, 2021, as chair of BC Housing in July 2022, and as the inaugural Fair Practices Commissioner for WorkSafeBC on May 1, 2023.

On July 24, 2023, BC Minister of Health Adrian Dix appointed Seckel via ministerial order to lead the process of amalgamating British Columbia's health colleges under the Health Professions Act. On June 6, 2024, it was announced that Minister Dix had appointed Seckel as chair of the boards of two newly-formed colleges, the College of Complementary Health Professionals of British Columbia (CCHPBC) and College of Health and Care Professionals of British Columbia (CHCPBC). The amalgamation process was completed on June 28, 2024.

In early August 2025, the Government of British Columbia announced that Seckel would receive the Order of British Columbia "for his leadership and lasting impact across law, government and community, helping to shape a more just and inclusive B.C."
