= Neufeld (surname) =

Neufeld is a surname of German origin, meaning "new field".

- Dale Neufeld, former director of the Canadian Security Intelligence Service
- Elizabeth F. Neufeld (born 1928), American geneticist
- Gordon Neufeld (born 1946), Canadian psychologist
- Harold Neufeld (born 1927), Canadian politician from Manitoba
- Josh Neufeld (born 1967), American non-fiction cartoonist
- Kevin Neufeld (born 1960), Canadian Olympic rower
- Korky Neufeld, Canadian politician
- Larry Neufeld, Canadian politician
- Mace Neufeld (1928–2022), American film and television producer
- Maurice F. Neufeld (1910–2003), American academic, author, and union organizer
- Michael J. Neufeld (born 1951), Canadian space historian and author
- Peter Neufeld (born 1950), American lawyer; co-founder of the Innocence Project
- Randy Neufeld (born 1962), Canadian curler
- Ray Neufeld (born 1959), Canadian professional ice hockey player
- Richard Neufeld (born 1944), Canadian politician from British Columbia
- Rick Neufeld, Canadian folk singer
- Ryan Neufeld (born 1975), American professional football player
- Sarah Neufeld (born 1979), Canadian violinist
