= CPIP =

CPIP may refer to:

- Carrier Pigeon Internet Protocol, a 2001 implementation of IP over Avian Carriers (IPoAC)
- Canadian Pandemic Influenza Preparedness, a task group developing influenza pandemic plans
- Certified Product Innovation Professional, a professional training program managed by Spark Engine
