= Bonnie Henry =

Canadian public health officer

Bonnie Henry OC OBC FRCPC
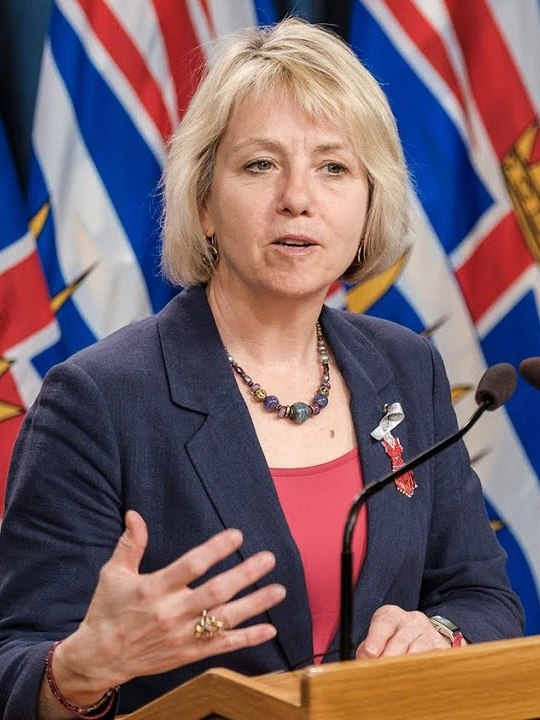
- Henry in 2020

British Columbia Provincial Health Officer
- Incumbent
- Assumed office January 31, 2018
- Preceded by: Perry Kendall

Personal details
- Born: 1965 or 1966 (age 60–61) Fredericton, New Brunswick, Canada
- Education: Mount Allison University (BSc, 1986); Dalhousie University (MD, 1990); San Diego State University (MPH, 1999)
- Occupation: Epidemiologist; Physician; Public official

Bonnie J. Fraser Henry (born 1965 or 1966) is a Canadian epidemiologist, physician, and public official who has been the provincial health officer at the British Columbia Ministry of Health since 2014. Henry is also a clinical associate professor at the University of British Columbia. She is a specialist in public health and preventive medicine, and is a family doctor. In her role as provincial health officer, Henry notably led the response to COVID-19 in British Columbia (BC).

== Early life and education ==
Born in Fredericton, New Brunswick, Henry grew up in Charlottetown, Prince Edward Island, where her mother, father, sister, niece, and nephew live. Her father was a major in the Canadian Army; the family lived in many different locations due to his postings, including Calgary, St. John's, and the Netherlands. Henry is the second-oldest of four daughters.

In 1986, Henry received a Bachelor of Science (Honours) from Mount Allison University. In 1990, Henry earned her Doctor of Medicine degree from Dalhousie University Faculty of Medicine. From 1996 to 1999, Henry did a residency in preventive medicine at the University of California, San Diego. In 1999, she earned a Master of Public Health degree in epidemiology from San Diego State University.

== Career ==
During her third year of medical school at Dalhousie, Henry joined the Royal Canadian Navy and served as a medical officer after graduating. She served for ten years at CFB Esquimalt, located in Victoria, BC on Vancouver Island.

In the early 2000s, Henry served as part of the World Health Organization (WHO) UNICEF polio eradication programme in Pakistan. She continued to work with the WHO in 2001, moving to Uganda to support their efforts to tackle the Ebola virus disease. Henry helped to establish the Canada Pandemic Influenza Plan, which contains recommendations for health-related activities during the spread of a virus.

In September 2001, Henry joined Toronto Public Health as an associate medical officer of health, where she led the Emergency Services Unit and the Communicable Disease Liaison Unit. In this capacity, she was the operational lead of the response to the severe acute respiratory syndrome (SARS) and Influenza A virus subtype H1N1 outbreaks in Toronto.

From 2005 to 2007, Henry worked as a physician epidemiologist at the BC Centre for Disease Control. From 2007 to 2014, she was the medical director of Public Health Emergency Management while also working as medical director of Communicable Disease Prevention and Control starting in 2011. She helped Canada plan and police the 2010 Winter Olympics.

In December 2013, Henry was made interim provincial executive medical director of the BC Centre for Disease Control. She was made Deputy Provincial Health Officer in August 2014, a position she held for three years. She helped to lead British Columbia through a catastrophic wildfire season, which impacted the air quality, as well as advising the Government of Canada on the Influenza A virus subtype H7N9 epidemic. In 2015, she testified as an expert witness alongside Allison McGeer in a labour arbitration between the Ontario Nurses' Association and Sault Area Hospital regarding a "vaccine or mask" policy.

In February 2018, Henry was appointed as the provincial health officer for British Columbia, the first woman to hold the role. She chairs the pandemic influenza task group. The group looks to minimise the number of people who become seriously ill during a pandemic, as well as limit the social disruptions. She called for more efficient electronic systems to understand vaccine uptake, as well as manage Canada's vaccine inventory.

Henry has taught at the University of British Columbia School of Population and Public Health and the Faculty of Medicine since 2010, where she is an associate professor. She also received an honorary degree from the University of British Columbia in 2021.

== COVID-19 response ==
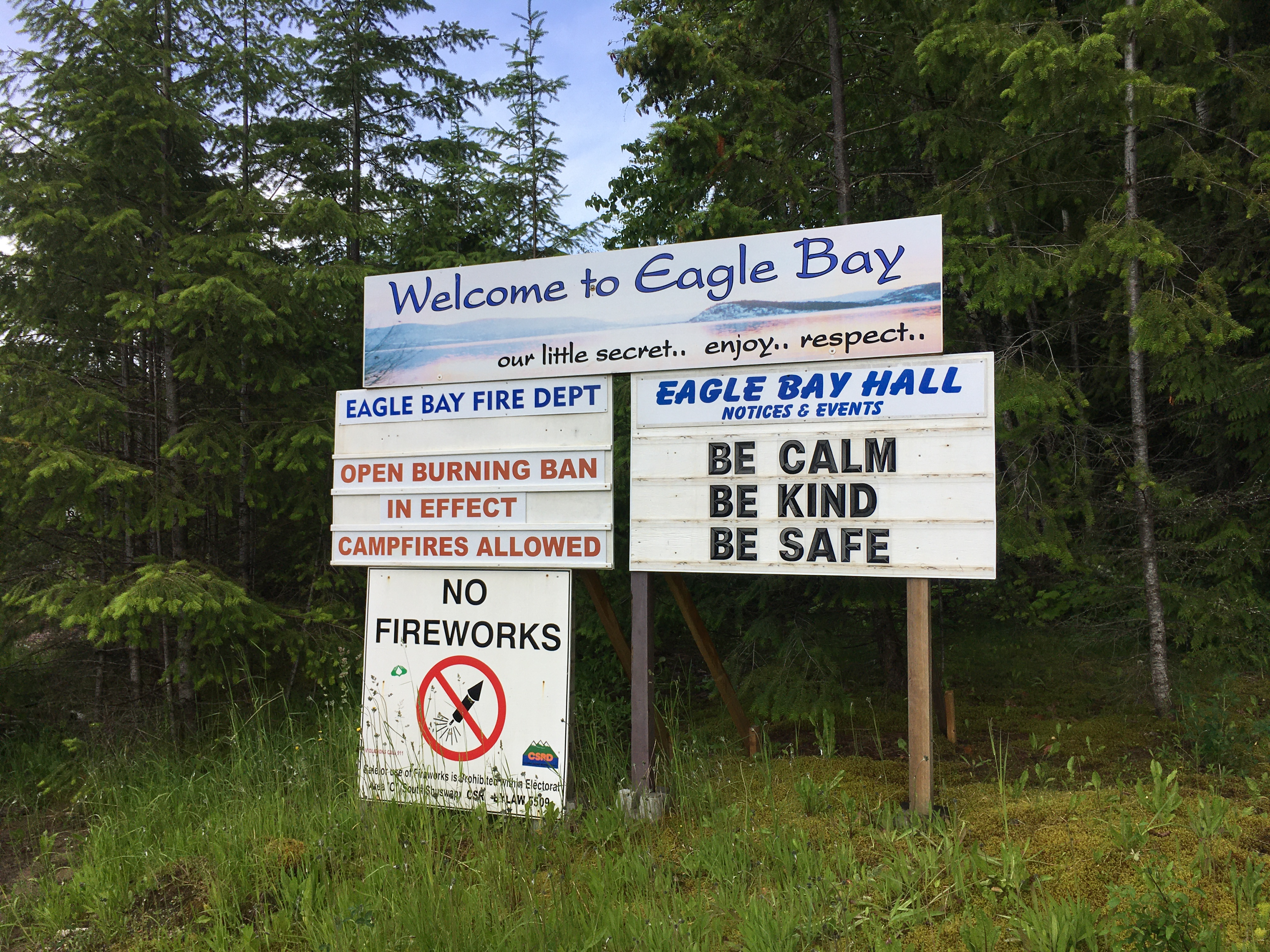
Community association sign in Eagle Bay, British Columbia, Canada, bearing the phrase "be calm, be kind, be safe", coined by Henry during the early days of the COVID pandemic.

Henry leads the provincial government's response to the COVID-19 pandemic in British Columbia. Her early handling of the COVID-19 pandemic in British Columbia earned praise from the New York Times in June 2020. In August, September, and October 2020, Henry was criticized for not mandating public mask usage and the province's back-to-school plans. In November and December concerns were raised regarding the lack of transparency around COVID-19 data. In December 2021, she was criticized for previous claims that COVID mostly spreads by droplets instead of aerosols.

A book written by Bonnie Henry and her sister Lynn Henry was released in February 2021 called Be Kind, Be Calm, Be Safe. It describes the four early weeks of the COVID-19 pandemic.

=== First half 2020 ===
On January 30, 2020, following confirmation of the first infected person in British Columbia, Henry advised the public that "It is not necessary for the general public to take special precautions beyond the usual measures recommended to prevent other common respiratory viruses during the winter period." In March, medical columnist for The Globe and Mail described her as "a calming voice in a sea of coronavirus madness". In April, she cautioned against relying on mass testing as a strategy to control the spread of SARS-CoV-2 due to the risk of "up to 30 per cent" of tests potentially resulting in false negatives. In June, Henry was featured in a New York Times article titled "The Top Doctor Who Aced the Coronavirus Test", praising the way that she has handled the COVID-19 pandemic.

=== Second half 2020 ===
In August, September, and October 2020, Henry was criticized for not mandating public mask usage and BC's back-to-school plans. This included not allowing the requirement for masks in classrooms in the province, and only permitting the universal requirement for masks in hospitals on November 6, 2020.

A limited edition Compass card featuring the quote from Henry, "Be Kind, Be Calm, Be Safe," was released by TransLink on September 15, 2020. On September 22, 2020, Henry stated that she received death threats and "(has) had to have security in (her) house."

In November 2020, the Public Health Agency of Canada (PHAC) stated that BC was no longer saying what proportion of people who tested positive are healthcare providers. Initially Henry denied that these data were not being provided to the Canadian government, while also saying that she was worried that the federal government would not present it properly. The numbers were subsequently released with 1,442 (8.9%) out of 16,136 cases in BC in healthcare providers. In November, Henry indicated that not all public health data were being shared with the federal government due to concerns with how they were being interpreted at the federal level, and that could lead to incorrect assumptions regarding COVID-19 spread. She did confirm that they were sharing all aggregate data. Further concerns were raised in December regarding the lack of transparency of COVID-19 data in BC.

Henry was named a co-investigator in the Canadian Network of COVID-19 Clinical Trials Networks, a $6 million grant provided by the Canadian Institutes of Health Research to support research and implementation of public health interventions across Canada. The funding period runs from December 1, 2020 until June 30, 2022.

On December 22, Henry received one of the first 3,600 doses of the Pfizer–BioNTech COVID-19 vaccine, saying "It’s really my way of showing how confident we are in the vaccine and how important it is for all of us to be immunized in solidarity with (health-care workers)".

=== 2021 ===
In July 2021, Henry warned that while it was an individual choice to accept or decline a COVID-19 vaccine, "there are consequences for people who are not immunized". In December 2021, she was criticized for prior claims that COVID-19 mostly spreads by droplets instead of aerosols.

=== 2022 ===
In 2022, internal emails obtained by members of the press showed that Henry and other BC public health officials had been aware of concerns about BC's COVID-19 school transmission data, including a "daunting" spike in exposures, while having publicly claimed that transmission was very low and parents shouldn't worry "needlessly". Earlier that year, Henry had co-authored a peer-reviewed study documenting a steep increase in COVID-19 infection in Metro Vancouver and the Fraser Valley in 2022, with the highest numbers among children and youth.

=== 2023 ===
In April 2023, Henry removed the mask requirement from BC medical settings, drawing criticism from independent experts as well as BC's Human Rights Commissioner, who stated the action "does not uphold a human rights centred approach to public health". At the time, the World Health Organization continued to recommend mask requirements in healthcare settings. After public pressure, Henry partially restored healthcare mask requirements on October 3, 2023.

=== 2024 ===
On July 26, 2024, Henry announced all remaining restrictions, including the vaccination requirement for health-care workers, will be rescinded.

== Personal life ==
Henry lives in Victoria, British Columbia. She met her husband while serving in the Royal Canadian Navy. The couple separated after 20 years of marriage. Henry was made a Member of the Order of British Columbia and awarded the British Columbia Medal of Good Citizenship in 2021. She was made an officer of the Order of Canada in 2025.

== Leadership ==
- 2009: Canadian Pandemic Coordinating Committee responding to pandemic H1N1 influenza, Member
- Canadian Public Health Measures Task Group, Chair
- Canadian National Advisory Committee on Immunization, Member
- Immunize Canada, Chair
- Infection Control Expert Group, Member
- National Infection Control Guidelines Steering Committee
- Ontario SARS Scientific Advisory Committee, Executive Team Member

== Certifications ==
- 1999: American College of Preventive Medicine, Board Certification, Preventative Medicine
- 2001: Royal College of Physicians and Surgeons of Canada, Fellow, Public Health and Preventive Medicine

== Selected works and publications ==
=== Selected works ===
- Henry, Bonnie (2012). Soap and Water & Common Sense: The Definitive Guide to Viruses, Bacteria, Parasites and Disease. Toronto: Anansi. ISBN 978-0-88784-937-4. OCLC 805951252.
- Henry, Bonnie; Henry, Lynn (2021). Be Kind, Be Calm, Be Safe: Four Weeks that Shaped a Pandemic. Toronto: Allen Lane Canada. ISBN 9780735241855. OCLC 118342473.

=== Selected publications ===
- Poutanen, Susan M; Low, Donald E; Henry, Bonnie; Finkelstein, Sandy; Rose, David; Green, Karen; Tellier, Raymond; Draker, Ryan; Adachi, Dena; Ayers, Melissa; Chan, Adrienne K (2003). "Identification of Severe Acute Respiratory Syndrome in Canada". New England Journal of Medicine. 348 (20): 1995–2005. doi:10.1056/NEJMoa030634. hdl:1807/16919. ISSN 0028-4793. OCLC 4638980317. PMID 12671061.
- Svoboda, Tomislav; Henry, Bonnie; Shulman, Leslie; Kennedy, Erin; Rea, Elizabeth; Ng, Wil; Wallington, Tamara; Yaffe, Barbara; Gournis, Effie; Vicencio, Elisa; Basrur, Sheela (June 3, 2004). "Public Health Measures to Control the Spread of the Severe Acute Respiratory Syndrome during the Outbreak in Toronto". New England Journal of Medicine. 350 (23): 2352–2361. doi:10.1056/nejmoa032111. ISSN 0028-4793. PMID 15175437.
- Loeb, Mark; McGeer, Allison; Henry, Bonnie; Ofner, Marianna; Rose, David; Hlywka, Tammy; Levie, Joanne; McQueen, Jane; Smith, Stephanie; Moss, Lorraine; Smith, Andrew (2004). "SARS among Critical Care Nurses, Toronto". Emerging Infectious Diseases. 10 (2): 251–255. doi:10.3201/eid1002.030838. ISSN 1080-6040. PMC 3322898. PMID 15030692.
- Basrur, Sheela V.; Yaffe, Barbara; Henry, Bonnie (2004). "SARS: A Local Public Health Perspective". Canadian Journal of Public Health. 95 (1): 22–24. doi:10.1007/BF03403628. PMC 6976208. PMID 14768736.
- Henry, B.; Gadient, S. (2017). "Canada's pandemic vaccine strategy". Canada Communicable Disease Report. 43 (7/8): 164–167. doi:10.14745/ccdr.v43i78a05. PMC 5764724. PMID 29770084.
- Henry, B. (2018). "Canadian Pandemic Influenza Preparedness: Health sector planning guidance". Canada Communicable Disease Report. 44 (1): 6–9. doi:10.14745/ccdr.v44i01a02. PMC 5937063. PMID 29770091.
