= 2009 swine flu pandemic in Canada =

2009 flu pandemic in Canada
- Deaths Confirmed cases

- 2000+ cases 500+ cases 100+ cases 1+ cases

- 1+ deaths 5+ deaths 20+ deaths Outbreak evolution in Canada
- Disease: Swine flu
- Pathogen: H1N1
- First outbreak: Thought to be Veracruz, Mexico
- Arrival date: 20 April 2009
- Suspected cases: 1.5 million (by 20 November 2016)
- Deaths: 428

The 2009 swine flu pandemic in Canada was part of an epidemic in 2009 of a new strain of influenza A virus subtype H1N1 causing what has been commonly called swine flu. In Canada, roughly 10% of the populace (or 3.5 million) has been infected with the virus, with 428 confirmed deaths (as of 20 February 2017); non-fatal individual cases are for the most part no longer being recorded. About 40% of Canadians have been immunized against H1N1 since a national vaccination campaign began in October 2009, with Canada among the countries in the world leading in the percentage of the population that has been vaccinated. The widespread effect of H1N1 in Canada raised concerns during the months leading to the XXI Olympic Winter Games, which took place in Vancouver in February 2010.

== Human cases ==
=== Alberta ===
As of 9 April 2010, there were 1,278 confirmed hospitalized cases in Alberta.

On 2 May 2009, Canadian Food Inspection Agency executive vice-president Brian Evans announced that an infected Alberta farm worker recently returned from Mexico had apparently passed the virus to a swine herd in his care. Although the herd had been quarantined, Evans stressed that the infection represented no threat to food safety and judged the possibility of infected pigs passing the virus back to humans "remote". Evans said the infection of the herd was the first known case of the H1N1 virus being transmitted from humans to pigs. Transmission from the same herd of pigs back to humans was revealed on 20 July, though it occurred on 7 May when the humans, health inspectors, were taking samples from the infected herd with improper self-protective measures.

On 8 May, health officials in Alberta confirmed that swine flu contributed to the death of a woman in Northern Alberta on 28 April, Canada's first death associated with the illness.

As of 14 August 2009, there were 1,648 confirmed cases of swine flu in Alberta. Health and Wellness Alberta stopped reporting non-hospitalized cases on 21 August.

=== British Columbia ===
The B.C. government has reported 1,060 severe flu cases as of 2 February 2010. 49 of 56 fatalities were people with underlying medical conditions. The province is no longer reporting non-severe cases (Total cases reached 676 by 10 August).

The initial cases in British Columbia involved two young men aged 25–35 from the B.C. Lower Mainland who had recently come back from Mexico, according to Danuta Skowronski, head of flu and respiratory illnesses at the BC Centre for Disease Control, run by the provincial government. The cases were discovered by normal flu testing conducted by the disease control centre after the men had visited a doctor about flu-like symptoms. She noted the disease seemed "widespread" in Mexico and should not be mistaken by tourists to be linked only with urban Mexico City. The first fatality in British Columbia caused by the H1N1 virus occurred on 14 July, and was a young child who died within 24 hours of being rushed to the hospital. There were concerns of H1N1 during the months leading up to the 2010 Winter Olympics that occurred in Vancouver in February 2010, as a result volunteers were urged to be vaccinated. On 28 January, Perry Kendall, the provincial health officer, stated that the chances of a third wave of H1N1 were "diminishing". However, he maintained that vaccinations continued to be recommended for all and are vital for reducing the risk of another wave of H1N1.

=== Manitoba ===
As of 5 October 2009, there were 892 confirmed cases in the province, with 7 deaths associated with the H1N1 virus. As of 1 February 2010, there had been 1,774 new confirmed cases, with 4 deaths since the start of the "second wave" 6 October.

On 3 May, the first case in Manitoba was confirmed in the Brandon area.

=== Newfoundland and Labrador ===
As of 4 January 2010, there were 267 hospitalized cases in the province.

On 13 June, Newfoundland and Labrador reported their first case of swine flu, becoming the final province to do so. The case involves a sample collected from a young man who was treated Thursday 11 June at the hospital in Grand Falls-Windsor.

The first recorded death of a person with swine flu was recorded on 1 November 2009, when a 36-year-old woman died from the virus.

=== New Brunswick ===
The first case in New Brunswick was confirmed to be present in Greater Moncton on 1 May 2009.

By 28 August, there had been 147 confirmed cases in New Brunswick. The first deaths occurred 13 November.

=== Northwest Territories ===
On 1 June, the Northwest Territories confirmed their first case of swine flu. The first death occurred in November.

=== Nova Scotia ===
From the beginning of the 2009–10 flu season in September until 2 December, there were 739 confirmed cases, including 255 hospitalizations.

First cases: Nova Scotia's chief medical officer, Robert Strang, said on 26 April that the National Microbiology Laboratory in Winnipeg confirmed late the previous day that four people in the province between the ages of 12 and 18 were recovering from "relatively mild" cases of the disease. The four people were students attending King's-Edgehill School preparatory school in Windsor, Nova Scotia. One of the infected students had been on a recent school trip to the Yucatán Peninsula in southern Mexico.

=== Nunavut ===
On 16 July 2009, Nunavut reported its first swine flu death. As of 5 August, there were 496 confirmed cases of the swine flu.

=== Ontario ===
There were 8,633 confirmed cases in Ontario, with 1,725 hospitalizations as of 10 December.

On 27 April 2009, four cases were suspected to be swine flu in Ontario. This number grew to ten cases in five days. On 25 May, Ontario Health Minister David Caplan confirmed that a Toronto man in his 40s had died of the virus.

The Toronto region acted as a secondary epicentre during the 2003 SARS epidemic, and took extra precautions against the H1N1 virus in the early stages of the pandemic.

Ontario is also home to what is believed to be the youngest Canadian death from swine flu, that of a two-month-old infant on 2 November 2009. This death, is one of three recently reported in London, Ontario, and has brought the number of confirmed deaths from H1N1 since April in Ontario to 95 as of 26 November 2009.

=== Prince Edward Island ===
As of 8 December 2009, there were 50 hospitalizations in the province, and no deaths.

Prince Edward Island confirmed its first two cases in Charlottetown on 4 May 2009.

Swine can be infected by both avian and human influenza strains of influenza, and therefore are hosts where the antigenic shifts can occur that create new influenza strains.

=== Quebec ===
There had been 2,422 hospitalized cases as of 4 December 2009.

While an early case Quebec turned out not to be swine flu, on 30 April 2009, the first case in the province was confirmed in the Greater Montreal Area.

The first case of death was announced on 8 June, making the total of 4 deaths for Canada. The person was a more than 65-year-old woman suffering from respiratory diseases before being hospitalized on 2 June. According to medical expertise, she had never traveled to Mexico and had no contact with those who did.

Confirmed cases totalled 10,714 between 30 August and 4 December 2009.

=== Saskatchewan ===
The first cases were confirmed on 7 May in the Saskatoon and Regina areas.

The province stopped counting individual cases as of 23 July 2009. At that point there were 888 confirmed cases.

=== Yukon ===
On 12 May 2009, Yukon reported its first case of swine flu. The first death was a school-aged girl who died on 1 November.

=== Totals ===
Province/Territory	Confirmed Deaths by 20 February	Increase Reported 14 – 20 February
British Columbia	57	1
Alberta	71	0
Saskatchewan	15	0
Manitoba	11	0
Ontario	128	0
Quebec	108	0
New Brunswick	8	0
Nova Scotia	7	0
Prince Edward Island	0	0
Newfoundland and Labrador	18	0
Yukon	3	0
Northwest Territories	1	0
Nunavut	1	0
Total	428	1

=== Progression Chart ===
Evolution of the Novel Human Swine Influenza A/H1N1(2009) Mexican Flu in Canada

== Non-human cases ==
On 2 May, the first incidence in Canada of the flu in pigs was discovered on a farm in Alberta. It is suspected that an infected farmhand who recently returned from Mexico infected the animals.

In Canada in early June, the Alberta pig farmer whose herd was infected with the new swine flu virus culled his entire herd. In May he had already culled 500 animals from his herd. The farm owner said the animals could not be marketed because they are under quarantine and he was facing a problem with overcrowding.

== Response ==
Michael Gardam, director of infectious disease prevention and control at the Ontario Agency for Health Protection and Promotion, said in an interview with the CBC that an outbreak of swine flu in Ontario, Canada's most populous province, would not be as serious as the 2003 SARS epidemic. In preparing for and dealing with an influenza pandemic, the Public Health Agency of Canada follows the WHO's categories, but has expanded them somewhat. Despite initial reports of two swine influenza cases in Montreal's Lakeshore General Hospital, Johanne Simard of the Montreal Regional Health Board confirmed negative results for all quarantined patients at the hospital and that no quarantines were currently in effect at the hospital. The National Microbiology Laboratory in Winnipeg confirmed cases of human swine influenza virus in clinical specimens sent from Mexico and the Canadian government issued a travel advisory for Mexico, warning Canadians who have returned from the country of the severe respiratory illness.

On 26 April, the Government of Nova Scotia announced on a live webcast that four students in Windsor, Nova Scotia, have confirmed cases of swine flu. Later that day, the Federal Government confirmed the existence of a total of six cases in Canada; four in Nova Scotia and two in British Columbia. Federal Health minister Leona Aglukkaq said the Canadian federal government would take whatever measures were necessary to keep the public safe, and that as Canada continued to ramp out its surveillance efforts there would likely be more reported cases. She also said she had been in contact with her provincial and territorial counterparts and had ordered the Public Health Agency of Canada to alert border authorities, quarantine officers and other officials. However, Canada's Chief Public Health Officer, David Butler-Jones, stated that the six affected Canadians suffered from only mild symptoms and have already started to recover. However, Butler-Jones warned against complacency, stating that the fact that only mild cases have been reported so far "doesn't mean we won't see either some more severe illness or potentially deaths." In both provinces, the cases either involved people who had recently returned from Mexico or those in close contact with such people.

In a step towards understanding the outbreak, and developing a vaccine, Canadian scientists completed the first full genetic sequencing of the H1N1 swine flu virus on 6 May.

The high percentage of mild to severe cases amongst First Nations Peoples in Manitoba and Northern Ontario, when compared to the general population, have raised questions about the vulnerability of these communities to H1N1 across Canada. Concerns have also risen about whether the Canadian government's pandemic preparation plan is able to properly address the specific needs of these communities.

== Timeline ==
2009	A(H1N1) Outbreak and Pandemic Milestones in Canada
26 April	First case confirmed in Nova Scotia (First Case in Canada)
26 April	First confirmed case in British Columbia.
28 April	First confirmed case in Alberta.
28 April	First confirmed case in Ontario.
30 April	First confirmed case in Quebec
1 May	First confirmed case in New Brunswick
3 May	(Alberta) First known cases of reverse zoonosis in the world.
3 May	(Alberta) First known infected pigs found in the world.
4 May	First confirmed cases on Prince Edward Island
7 May	First death confirmed in Alberta. (first death in Canada)
7 May	(Alberta) First case of zoonosis in Canada, where an infected pig infects a human.
7 May	First confirmed case in Saskatchewan.
8 May	Community outbreaks confirmed in Canada.
9 May	First confirmed case in the Manitoba.
12 May	First confirmed case in the Yukon.
25 May	First death in Ontario.
28 May	First confirmed case in the Nunavut.
1 June	First confirmed case in the Northwest Territories.
8 June	First death in Quebec.
13 June	First confirmed case in Newfoundland and Labrador.
16 June	First death in Manitoba.
27 June	First death in Saskatchewan.
14 July	First death in British Columbia.
15 July	First death in Nunavut.
22 July	(Quebec) First case of Oseltamivir (Tamiflu) resistance found in Canada.
24 July	First death in Nova Scotia.
31 October	First death in Newfoundland and Labrador.
1 November	First death in the Yukon.
13 November	First death in New Brunswick.
25 November	First death in the Northwest Territories.

== See also ==
- 1918 flu pandemic
- Avian flu
- Severe acute respiratory syndrome (SARS)
- List of Canadian medical disasters
