= Liz Evans (nurse) =

Canadian nurse (born 1965)

Liz Evans (born August 30, 1965) is a Canadian nurse and harm reduction advocate. She is the founder of the nonprofit Portland Hotel Society and a cofounder of North America's first sanctioned supervised-injection facility, Insite.

Evans established the Portland Hotel Society in August 1993 in Vancouver, Canada, to provide shelter to people living in the city's Downtown Eastside who were addicted to drugs or who struggled with disruptive mental-health issues. Usually, these individuals had been evicted from several supportive-housing projects before Evans found them and gave them a room at the organization's first housing project, the Portland Hotel. Evans refused to evict "hard-to-house" tenants, many of whom openly used injection drugs or otherwise exhibited difficult behaviors as a result of an untreated mental illness. To accommodate these individuals, Evans developed a practice which would later come to be known as housing first, a collection of social policies that prioritize shelter before requiring a tenant to stop using illegal drugs or stabilizing their mental-health condition.

In September 2003, Evans, her husband Mark Townsend, and colleagues with the Portland Hotel Society partnered with the regional health authority, Vancouver Coastal Health, to establish Insite, North America's first sanctioned supervised-injection facility, at 139 East Hastings Street. At the time, Vancouver's Downtown Eastside was experiencing a sharp increase in drug-overdose deaths, and Evans and Townsend opened Insite as part of the solution. The facility was the result of a long advocacy campaign that the Portland Hotel Society fought in cooperation the Vancouver Area Network of Drug Users. The two groups argued for the Canadian government to allow supervised injection by granting the building an exemption from the country's Controlled Drugs and Substances Act, which it eventually did in 2003.

In 2007, a Conservative government was elected that was hostile to the facility. Evans and Townsend mounted a constitutional challenge that argued Insite's closure would deny life-saving health-care services to people who used drugs. Led by lawyer Joseph Arvay, the case was eventually heard by the Supreme Court of Canada and, on September 29, 2011, the court ruled unanimously that it would be unconstitutional for the federal government to refuse to continuing granting Insite an exemption from the Controlled Drugs and Substances Act.

Evans and Townsend left the Portland Hotel Society in 2014.
