= Perry Kendall =

Public health physician

- Born: Perry Robert William Kendall; 1943 (age 82–83); Middlesex County, London, United Kingdom
- Citizenship: Canadian and British
- Occupation: Public health
- Years active: 1984-2022
- Known for: harm reduction
- Medical career
- Institutions: Ministry of Health (British Columbia); Ontario Ministry of Health; Capital Regional District; City of Toronto
- Awards: Order of Canada 2019, Order of British Columbia 2005

Perry Kendall Order of Canada[[[Order of British Columbia]] (born 1943) is a Canadian public health physician who was Provincial Health Officer (PHO) for the Canadian province of British Columbia's health ministry from 1999-2018 and was awarded the Order of British Columbia for contributions to Public health field and to harm reduction policy and practice.

After about 20 years, Kendall retired from the Provincial Health Office role on Jan. 31, 2018 and was replaced by Bonnie Henry.

== Early career ==
Born in the United Kingdom in 1943, Kendall completed his undergraduate medical training at University College Hospital Medical School in 1968 before spending a year as Senior House Officer at the University Hospital of the West Indies in Kingston, Jamaica.

In 1972, he moved to Toronto, working in general practice at the Hassle Free Clinic. Over the next two decades, Kendall moved back and forth between the provinces of Ontario and British Columbia. He moved to Vancouver in 1974 to work for the Vancouver Health Department's Pine Free Clinic and East Health Unit while acquiring a master's degree in Health Care Planning and Epidemiology and a Fellowship in Community Medicine. He then returned to Ontario in 1984 to work as a manager with the Ontario Ministry of Health until 1987, when he returned to British Columbia as Medical Officer of Health for the Capital Regional District, in which capacity he opened one of Canada's first needle exchange programs.

In 1989, he started a six-year career as Medical Officer of Health for the City of Toronto government where he pioneered programs for HIV/AIDS and drug abuse prevention, established Harm Reduction as the official City policy for substance abuse, and city tobacco control by-laws. In 1995, Kendall was appointed President of the Addiction Research Foundation of Ontario, one of six academic health science centres in Toronto and a WHO Collaborating Centre, until consolidation with other organizations occurred in 1998.

== Provincial Health Officer ==
The provincial government of Premier Glen Clark created the position of Provincial Health Officer (PHO) as an independent officer for the Ministry of Health through the Public Health Act.

After a year serving as vice-president, Seniors' Health, with the Capital Health Region in Victoria, British Columbia, Kendall was appointed as the Provincial Health Officer for the province of British Columbia on May 3, 1999.

Kendall also participated on a number of provincial and national committees and was the first provincial-territorial co-chair of then Pan-Canadian Public Health Network Council. As PHO, he worked with the Chief Medical Health Officers of the regional health authorities (e.g. Francis John Blatherwick of Vancouver Coastal Health). Kendall appointed Evan Adams and Bonnie Henry as Deputy Provincial Health Officers. He was responsible for a number of ground breaking health reports including the first provincial report on the health and wellness of Indigenous People in British Columbia and played a significant role in the establishment of Insite, North America’s first legally sanctioned supervised consumption site.

In late 2014, Kendall announced he would retire as PHO in early 2015 but later rescinded his decision to retire for approximately three years.

=== Public health topics during PHO tenure ===
- 2016 - Public Health Emergency of Overdose Deaths
- 2014 - role changes by federal government for national Chief Public Health Officer
- 2011 - British Columbia exposure to radiation from Japan nuclear reactor disaster
- 2010 Winter Olympics emergency preparedness
- 2009 - H1N1 influenza pandemic
- 2003 - establishment of Insite, first legal supervised drug injection site in North America,
- 2002-03 SARS outbreak
- Heroin-assisted treatment
- proposed legalization of marijuana

== Recognition ==
OBC ribbon

- 1991 - Addiction Research Foundation Community Achievement Award for leadership in substance abuse prevention
- 1992 - Non Smokers Rights Association Award of Merit
- 2005 - Order of British Columbia (OBC)
