= Portland Hotel Society =

Canadian non-profit society

- PHS Community Services Society
- Founded: 1993; 33 years ago
- Founder: Liz Evans; Mark Townsend
- Founded at: Downtown Eastside, Vancouver
- Type: Non-profit organization, charitable organization
- Location: Vancouver, British Columbia, Canada
- Region served: Vancouver; Victoria
- Website: https://www.phs.ca

The PHS Community Services Society, also known as the Portland Hotel Society (PHS), is a Canadian non-profit organization created in 1993 to provide advocacy, housing, services, and opportunities, for Vancouver's Downtown Eastside. Its staff support thousands of supportive housing rooms and operate North America's first legal supervised-injection site, Insite, a Downtown Eastside credit union branch (Pigeon Park Savings), a food service that feeds people in single-room occupancy residences (Downtown Eastside Central Kitchen), and other social services and enterprises.

== History ==
In 1991, the Downtown Eastside Residents Association (DERA) converted a local hotel to housing for homeless people and named it after the American city of Portland, Oregon, due to its reputation for aiding homeless people. Shortly after, the hotel became the headquarters of PHS as a breakaway group from DERA.

PHS was founded by Liz Evans and her partner, Mark Townsend, as well as Kerstin Stuerzbecher, Dan Small, and Tom Laviolette. Other early employees include Coco Culbertson, Tanya Fader, and Andy Bond.

In 2003, the Portland Hotel Society renamed itself PHS Community Services Society to better reflect the organization's growing breadth of services. It continues to be widely known and often referred to in media, however, as the "Portland Hotel Society" and "PHS."

== Housing ==
As of 2019, PHS operates over 24 supportive housing facilities across Vancouver and Victoria for community members who have experience with mental illnesses, challenges with substance use, a history of homelessness, past experience with the criminal justice system and other encounters with oppressive or structural violence. The program is funded by the BC Housing Management Commission (a provincial Crown corporation) and Vancouver Coastal Health Authority. Approximately 40 percent of residents remain in PHS housing for about 10 years, while the balance of residents stay 4 to 6 years. This contrasts dramatically with the prior history of residents, who typically registered 6 to 8 addresses – or none at all – in the year before moving to the Portland Hotel.

It currently operates several buildings owned by BC Housing, including the historic Woodwards SRO Replacement Housing, Washington Hotel, the Rainier Hotel, the Roosevelt Hotel, the Beacon Hotel and the Sunrise Hotel.

== Insite ==
In September 2003, the PHS forced Vancouver Coastal Health to found Insite by constructing and opening the site illegally. Insite became North America's first supervised injection site. The Government was forced through the pressure of public opinion to issue a special exemption to the Controlled Drugs and Substances Act.

On August 13, 2007, the Portland Hotel Society and two citizens filed suit in the BC Supreme Court to keep the centre open, arguing that its closure by the federal government would be a violation of the Charter right of Insite users to "security of the person".

On September 29, 2011, the Supreme Court of Canada ruled unanimously in Canada (AG) v PHS Community Services Society that the federal government's failure to renew Insite's exemption under the Controlled Drugs and Substances Act was

arbitrary, undermining the very purposes of the CDSA, which include public health and safety. It is also grossly disproportionate: the potential denial of health services and the correlative increase in the risk of death and disease to injection drug users outweigh any benefit that might be derived from maintaining an absolute prohibition on possession of illegal drugs on Insite's premises.

The Court ordered the federal government to grant an exemption to Insite forthwith, allowing the facility to stay open. Although the Court noted the government could later withdraw this exemption, "where [...] the evidence indicates that a supervised injection site will decrease the risk of death and disease, and there is little or no evidence that it will have a negative impact on public safety, the [government] should generally grant an exemption."

== Governance ==
According to filings with Revenue Canada, PHS revenue for 2013 exceeded $35.5 million, with 61 percent provided by the provincial government of British Columbia. For that year, management costs accounted for nine percent of expenses. In 2013, six full-time employees received compensation between $120,000 and $159,000.

In early 2014, the provincial minister responsible for housing Rich Coleman disclosed that an external audit by accounting firm KPMG found concerns about administration costs. While acknowledging mistakes, Townsend maintained the audit and its findings were more about politics than financial improprieties. He argued that PHS's primary government funders, BC Housing and Vancouver Coastal Health, were upset with Townsend and Evans for their harm reduction activism and protest activities, which often targeted BC Housing and Vancouver Coastal Health, and said BC Housing organized the audit to find an excuse for a change in leadership at PHS.

As a result of the audit's findings, the nine-member board and (husband and wife) co-executive directors Mark Townsend and Liz Evans resigned in March 2014. Replacement board members included Vancouver Coastal's former CEO Ida Goodreau and current Chief Medical Health Officer Patty Daly.
