= Canada's Pandemic Influenza Plan =

Canada's Pandemic Influenza Plan was released most recently in 2017 by the Canadian Pandemic Influenza Preparedness (CPIP) Task Group. It is available as an periodically updated webpage. It is available in pdf format.

== Numbers ==
The CPIP document describes at least two pandemic situations:

- A pandemic of "mild to moderate" severity could sicken 10.6 million Canadians, send 138,000 to hospital, and kill up to 58,000.
- A "severe" pandemic would be catastrophic, killing up to two per cent of the population, or 700,000 Canadians.

== History ==
CPIP dates from February 2004.

The province of British Columbia had a Pandemic Influenza Preparedness Plan as early as October 2005.

A March 2006 press release by Minister of Health Tony Clement references CPIP extensively. Clement pointed at the then-new www.pandemicinfluenza.gc.ca website. Both the Canadian Medical Association and Canadian Pharmacists Association, with a combined membership of approximately 63,000 health care professionals, were pleased to participate in the publicity.

In 2006, Dr Theresa Tam, who was later to become the CPHO, was a lead author for the CPIP document. The report advises that there be a 16-week stockpile of medical supplies to cover two pandemic waves.

In 2007, because CPIP had suggested in 2004 the use of antivirals as prophylaxis, a public consultation was held by PHAC to gauge the public's reaction.

CPIP Doctrine 2009 was for hospitals to cancel "non-emergency procedures", and antechambers would contain no toys or reading material. Doctrine 2009 "also cautions against the kind of knee-jerk reactions that do absolutely nothing to protect public health: the distribution of masks, the installation of extra hand-sanitizer dispensers in public places, the recruitment of increased number of cleaners at office buildings. Doctrine 2009 held that "an all-out travel ban does little else but stoke public anxiety and hammer local economies. If anything, your flight will be cancelled because so few people bought a ticket - not because the government said so."

As early as 2009, CPIP pointed out that improved flu screening was needed at airports.

In 2010, a Senate committee evaluated Canada's response to the recent H1N1 pandemic, and referenced the CPIP extensively. Even then it was understood that CPIP was to be updated regularly.

In 2011, the Harper government signed a deal with a Canadian pharmaceutical manufacturer to provide vaccine for 32 million Canadians because this course of action had been suggested by CPIP. The so-called "CPIP Task Group" wrote in 2017 that "The contract stipulates that the (domestic) manufacturer fulfill their commitment to Canada before selling the vaccine to other countries, ensuring an adequate supply for every person residing in Canada"; it also pointed out that the first contract with a vaccine manufacturer was placed in 2001, under the Chretien government.

In 2017 Canada Communicable Disease Report, a scientific publication which is mandated by the IHR as part of its communication strategy, published Canada’s pandemic vaccine strategy, and that article focuses on CPIP and its consequences.

== Members ==
- Dr Gerald Evans, 2009
- Dr Bonnie Henry, 2018
