= Journal of Global Drug Policy and Practice =

- Discipline: Drug policy
- Language: English

Publication details
- History: 2006–present
- Publisher: Drug Free America Foundation (United States)
- Frequency: Quarterly
- Open access: Yes

Standard abbreviations
- ISO 4: J. Glob. Drug Policy Pract.

Indexing
- ISSN: 1934-4708
- LCCN: 2006216251
- OCLC no.: 74670291

Links
- Journal homepage

The Journal of Global Drug Policy and Practice describes itself as an open access peer-reviewed public health journal. Critics say it is biased, not peer-reviewed, and not a legitimate scientific journal. It is funded by the US Department of Justice.

== Background ==
The journal is published online quarterly by the Institute on Global Drug Policy and the International Scientific and Medical Forum on Drug Abuse. These are both part of the Drug Free America Foundation, an organization that has referred to harm reduction efforts as "harm promotion", and characterized such efforts as "a tactic to normalize drug use". The stated goal of the Institute itself is as follows:

The Institute is charged with creating and strengthening international laws that hold drug users and dealers criminally accountable for their actions. It will vigorously promote treaties and agreements that provide clear penalties to individuals who buy, sell or use harmful drugs... The institute supports efforts to oppose policies based on the concept of harm reduction.

== Criticism ==
The publication has been criticized for having a political agenda to combat harm-reduction policies. It is funded by the Office of Juvenile Justice and Delinquency Prevention which is part of the U.S. Department of Justice. The president of the Canadian Health Libraries Association has also said it appears to be driven more by a political agenda than by science:

"That journal, which looks legitimate, which is being used by the Canadian government to back up various decisions, is supported by groups that believe enforcement is the route to reducing drug use."

Also referring to this journal, authors in the Canadian Medical Association Journal wrote,

Efforts to undermine the science specific to HIV prevention for injection drug users are becoming increasingly sophisticated. One new and worrisome trend is the creation of internet sites posing as open-access, peer-reviewed scientific journals. One such example, funded by the Drug Free America Foundation, contains a review of the research supporting needle exchange program and declares that the "effectiveness of NEPs [ needle-exchange programs ] to reduce HIV among IDUs [ injection drug users ] is overrated;" it further claims that the WHO position on needle exchange programs "is not based on solid evidence."

An opinion piece in The Lancet Infectious Diseases stated "To our knowledge, this is the first time a lobby group such as the Drug Free America Foundation has created for itself a venue for the dissemination of opinion essays, which to the untrained eye could easily be mistaken for a scientific journal".

== Use by Canadian Government ==
In 2007, the Canadian Minister of Health, Tony Clement, cited the journal to justify the Canadian Government's objections to harm-reduction programs.

== See also ==
- Politicization of science
- War on drugs
