= Gordon Neufeld =

Canadian psychologist

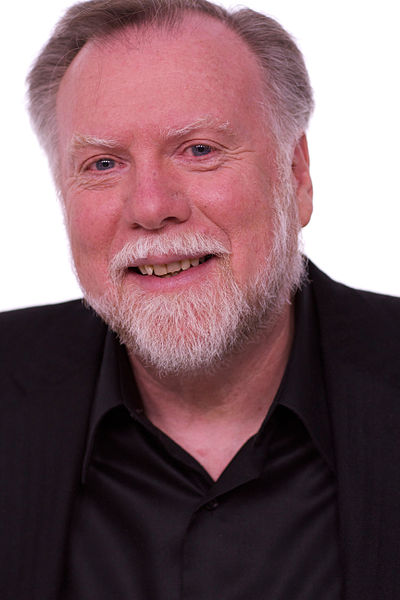
Gordon Neufeld in 2013

Gordon Neufeld (born 1946) is a developmental psychologist from Vancouver, British Columbia. He is the author of the book Hold on to Your Kids: Why Parents Need to Matter More Than Peers (co-authored with Canadian physician Gabor Maté).

== Early life ==
During the 1970s, Neufeld completed an undergraduate degree from the University of Winnipeg and graduate degrees from the University of British Columbia.

== Career ==
Neufeld's most significant contribution to developmental psychology is a theory of attachment that includes six stages in the development of the capacity for relationship, the construct of polarization that explains both shyness and defensive detachment. The Neufeld approach is based on the attachment theory formulated by John Bowlby. He taught psychology at the University of British Columbia for 20 years.

Neufeld is founder of the Neufeld Institute based in Vancouver, which provides education and training for parents and professionals based on Neufeld's theories.
