= Insite =

Safe drug injection facility in Vancouver, B.C., Canada

Coordinates: 49°16′52″N 123°06′04″W

- Type: Non-profit organization
- Industry: Health care, Supervised injection site
- Founded: 2003
- Headquarters: Vancouver, British Columbia, Canada
- Area served: Downtown Eastside neighbourhood
- Website: www.vch.ca/locations-services/result?res_id=964

Insite is a supervised drug injection site in the Downtown Eastside (DTES) neighbourhood of Vancouver, British Columbia, Canada The DTES had 4,700 chronic drug users in 2000 and has been considered to be the centre of an "injection drug epidemic". The site provides a supervised and health-focused location for injection drug use, primarily heroin. The clinic does not supply any drugs. Medical staff are present to provide addiction treatment, mental health assistance, and first aid in the event of an overdose or wound. In 2017, the site recorded 175,464 visits (an average of 480 injection room visits per day) by 7,301 unique users; 2,151 overdoses occurred with no fatalities, due to intervention by medical staff. The site also offers a free checking service so clients can check their substances for fentanyl and carfentanil. Health Canada has provided $500,000 per year to operate the site, and the BC Ministry of Health contributed $1,200,000 to renovate the site and cover operating costs. Insite also serves as a resource for those seeking to use a harm reduction approach for people who inject drugs around the world. In recent months and years, delegations from a number of countries are on record touring the facility, including various U.S. states, Colombia and Brazil. 95% of drug users who use Insite also inject on the street according to a British Columbia health official.

== Operation ==
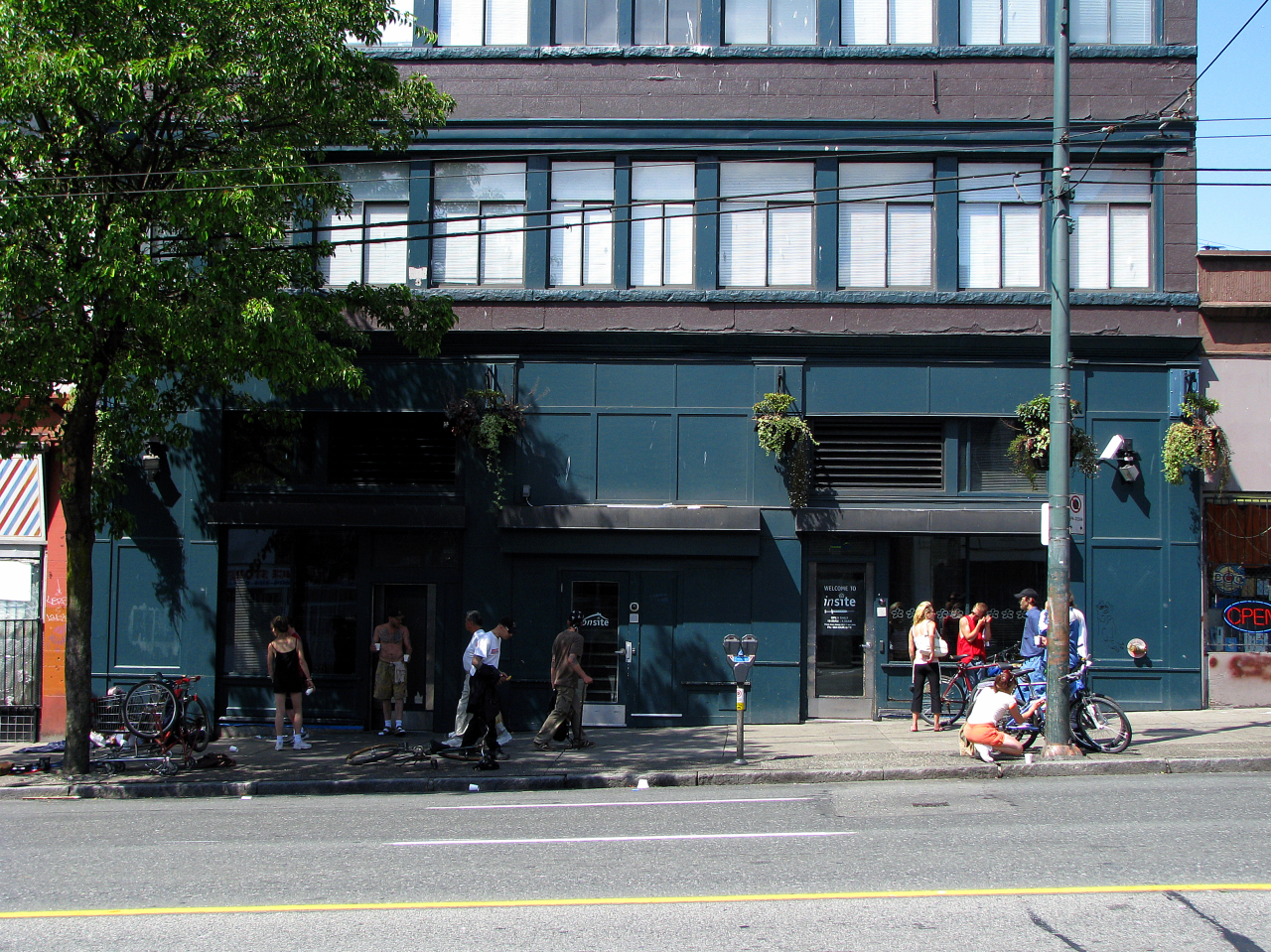
Insite in 2008

Insite is operated in tandem by Vancouver Coastal Health and the Portland Hotel Society. Between September 2003 and July 2008, the site operated under a special exemption of Section 56 of the Controlled Drugs and Substances Act, granted by the Liberal government via Health Canada. It is the first safe consumption site in North America. The site was slated to close on September 12, 2006, as the exemption was for a three-year pilot project. The Conservative minority government granted a temporary extension, then added another six-month extension that was to end in mid-2008. A constitutional challenge was heard by the Supreme Court of British Columbia to keep Insite open after Federal Health Minister Tony Clement refused to renew the exemption beyond July 2008. The court ruled that laws prohibiting possession and trafficking of drugs were unconstitutional because they denied drug users access to Insite's health services. Justice Ian Pitfield gave Ottawa until 30 June 2009 to amend the Controlled Drugs and Substances Act and bring it in line with the constitutional principle of fundamental justice (section seven of the Canadian Charter). The House of Commons did not amend the law meaning Insite currently operates under a constitutional exception to the Controlled Drugs and Substances Act.

== Research ==
When founded, Insite acquired legal exemption under the condition that its impacts be thoroughly evaluated. According to the evaluation report, the site has been studied in over 30 studies, published in 15 peer-reviewed journals. The research indicates an array of benefits, including reductions in public injecting and syringe sharing and increases in the use of detoxification services and addiction treatment among patients. In addition, studies assessing the potential harms of the site have not observed any adverse effects. Preliminary observations published in 2004 in the journal Harm Reduction indicate that the site successfully attracted injecting drug users and thus decreased public drug use. However, the researchers cautioned that a full assessment of the site would take several years.

Additional research in the Canadian Medical Association Journal suggests that the site has reduced public injections, neighbourhood litter, and needle sharing. Two studies in the journal Addiction and in the New England Journal of Medicine indicate that patients at the site have increased their use of detoxification services and long-term addiction treatment. Furthermore, research in The Lancet indicates that the site substantially reduces the sharing of syringes. A study in the journal Substance Abuse Treatment, Prevention, and Policy revealed that local police facilitate use of Insite, especially among high-risk users. The researchers concluded that the site "provides an opportunity to... resolve some of the existing tensions between public order and health initiatives."

A 2008 cost-benefit analysis of the site in the Canadian Medical Association Journal observed net-savings of $18 million and an increase of 1175 life-years over ten years. Another cost-benefit analysis published in the International Journal of Drug Policy in 2010 determined that the site prevents 35 cases of HIV and about three deaths per year, indicating a yearly net-societal benefit of more than $6 million.

An editorial in the Canadian Medical Association Journal noted that after three years of research "a remarkable consensus that the facility reduces harm to users and the public developed among scientists, criminologists, and even the Vancouver Police Department."

In 2011, the Lancet published a study by a team of researchers from the University of British Columbia (UBC), claiming 35% decreases in overdose deaths around Insite due to its presence. In the next issue of the scientific journal, a response was published led by Gary Christian, the research director of Drug Free Australia, that claimed that any decreases in overdose mortality can be sufficiently explained by drug user displacement due to a police crackdown in the area. They claimed that an increase of 48–66 police in 2003 were the cause of any reductions in overdoses. The original study's authors replied in the same issue, noting that the police crackdown cited actually ended a few weeks after the start of the Insite project and, therefore, decreases can't be accredited to increased policing.

== Reception ==
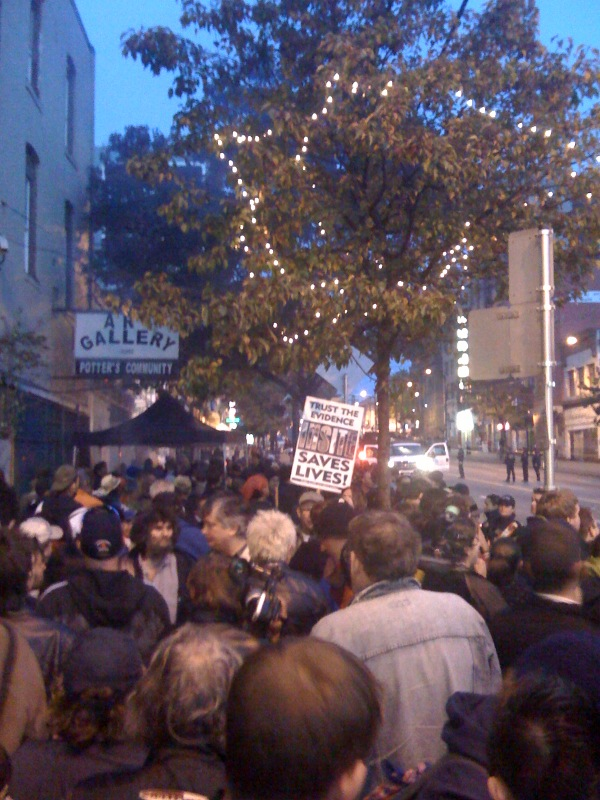
People crowd the sidewalk during a fundraiser for Insite in 2008

Letters of support and surveys show that health professionals, local police, the local community and the general public have positive or neutral views of INSITE services and the majority wish to see the service continue.

— Final Report of the Expert Advisory Committee for Tony Clement

Insite enjoys strong local support. While Insite is well liked throughout British Columbia, its popularity is highest inside Vancouver, where some 76% of residents expressed support for the facility. Furthermore, according to a 2007 national survey by Mustel Group, some 63% of Canadians believe the federal government should renew the Insite's mandate while 27% oppose. Support is lowest among Conservatives, only half of whom believe the site should continue operating.

The site drew criticism from the Bush administration; the director of the White House Office of National Drug Control Policy called Insite "state-sponsored suicide" on its opening. In 2006, the Canadian Police Association voted unanimously to encourage the federal government to stop funding Insite and instead invest in a national drug strategy. Moreover, Federal Health Minister Tony Clement branded Insite an "abomination," telling the Vancouver Sun that "allowing and/or encouraging people to inject heroin into their veins is not harm reduction... it is a form of harm addition."

The Royal Canadian Mounted Police (RCMP) has also criticized Insite. This is despite a report commissioned by the RCMP and conducted by two criminologists that concluded in favour of the injection site. The RCMP in British Columbia had agreed to announce their support for Insite in 2009 at a joint news conference with the BC Centre for Excellence in HIV/AIDS; they planned to note "an extensive body of Canadian and international peer-reviewed research reporting the benefits of supervised injection sites and no objective peer-reviewed studies demonstrating harms", and they were to admit that reports commissioned by the RCMP criticizing Insite "did not meet conventional academic standards." However, the RCMP in British Columbia were ordered by headquarters in Ottawa to cancel the news conference days before the event.

The most significant published criticism has been an article by Colin Mangham, the director of research for the Drug Prevention Network of Canada, in the online-only Journal of Global Drug Policy and Practice (JGDPP), which is said to be "posing as open-access, peer-reviewed scientific journal" In the article Mangham claims that "the published evaluations and especially reports in the popular media overstate findings, downplay or ignore negative findings, report meaningless findings and overall, give an impression the facility is successful, when in fact the research clearly shows a lack of program impact and success." He also claimed that interviews with area treatment centres revealed no referrals from Insite, and that police presence was deliberately bolstered in the area. Based on this article, Tony Clement told an August 2007 meeting of the Canadian Medical Association that his belief that Insite should close had been reaffirmed. Clement stated that "there has been more research done, and some of it has been questioning of the research that has already taken place and questioning of the methodology of those associated with Insite." The Journal of Global Drug Policy and Practice that Clement was referring to is run by the Drug Free America Foundation, and received much of its initial funding in a $1.5 million grant from a U.S. Department of Justice agency now under investigation for corruption.

Mangham's article has been questioned because it dismisses more than 20 peer-reviewed studies published in reputable medical journals such as The Lancet, the New England Journal of Medicine, and the British Medical Journal, all of which indicate that Insite has a positive effect. The Journal of Global Drug Policy and Practice (JGDPP) article, which was commissioned and financed by the RCMP, drew further criticism in the journal Open Medicine, where a commentary described it as being "fraught with a host of outright factual inaccuracies and unsubstantiated claims." More than 130 scientists signed a petition endorsing the commentary, which also criticized the government's evaluation of Insite as distortive and politicized. Another commentary in the International Journal of Drug Policy characterized the government's evaluation as "what may be a serious breach of international scientific standards".

In answer to an op-ed in National Post by Thomas Kerr, one of the co-authors of the Lancet study, the President for Drug Prevention Network of Canada, Gwendolyn Landolt, maintained her organization's view that the research on Insite is flawed. She said that much of the research on Insite was done by scientists who had lobbied for the clinic's establishment and that they consequently lacked objectivity. She further suggested that these researchers conspire with the editors of academic journals so that their papers are reviewed by referees that supports harm reduction. Gwendolyn Landolt also maintained that data shows that deaths from drug overdoses have actually increased in the vicinity of Insite most years since its inception, contrary to the point made by the allegedly biased Thomas Kerr in his preceding commentary. The next day the Provincial Health Officer Dr. Perry Kendall said he had never heard of the data Ms. Landolt refers to and confirmed Thomas Kerr's assertion that death from drug overdoses have indeed declined in the preceding years – especially so in the vicinity of Insite.

Later in 2011 Drug Free Australia sent a complaint to the Vice President of UBC, raising concerns of the scientific integrity of the studies authors. In reviewing the matter, Mark Wainberg of McGill University found that "the allegations that have been made by ‘Drug Free Australia’ are without merit and are not based on scientific fact. In contrast, it is my view that the work that has been carried out by the team of Thomas Kerr et al is scientifically well-founded and has contributed to reducing the extent of mortality and morbidity in association with the existence of the safer injection facility."

The campaign to launch Insite is profiled in Nettie Wild's documentary film FIX: The Story of an Addicted City.

== Government and legal controversy ==
While the Liberal government allowed Insite to open, between 2006 and 2015 its fate had been the responsibility of the Conservative government, which was not as supportive of it. Former Conservative Prime Minister Stephen Harper voiced opposition to the injection site in the past, saying, "We as a government will not use taxpayers' money to fund drug use." In mid-July 2006, Conservative Member of Parliament David Fletcher stated that the government would let Insite's special exemption lapse before deciding whether to continue the project. The following week a spokesman for Tony Clement, the Minister of Health, refuted that, saying that a decision had not been made yet. During the XVI International AIDS Conference, held in Toronto, two high-ranking Liberal MPs (Bill Graham and Keith Martin) put their support behind the centre, and criticized the Conservative government for delaying their decision. Insite supporters also demonstrated in Toronto during the conference, prompting the government to further delay any announcement, citing the week's "politicized" nature.

On September 1, 2006, Federal Health Minister Tony Clement deferred the decision of whether to extend the exemption for the site, citing a need for more research. However, on the same day the government cut all funding for future research, amounting to $1.5 million in lost research money. On August 13, 2007, the Portland Hotel Society and two clients of the facility filed suit in the BC Supreme Court to keep the centre open, arguing that its closure would be a violation of the Charter right of Insite users to "security of the person." On October 4, 2007, during the announcement of its $64-million drug strategy, the Conservative government announced that Insite will be granted another six-month extension, allowing it to operate until June 30, 2008. In 2008 Minister Clement explained his position during a House of Commons debate period:

. . . (t)he expert advisory committee was very clear. It found that only 3% of those who attend Insite actually get referred to treatment and that only 10% of those who use Insite use it for all their injections. The expert advisory committee insisted that Insite only saved one life, and that life is important but I want to save more than one life. I want to save hundreds of lives around the downtown eastside, which is why we are focused on treatment and on professionals. Not one life should be lost.

—

Mr. Clement's stance is based in part upon findings in the Journal of Global Drug Policy and Practice, a fringe science journal.

In May 2008, the B.C. Supreme Court struck down sections of the Canadian Criminal Code prohibiting drug trafficking and possession, ruling that they contravened the Canadian Charter of Rights and Freedoms. While this ruling does not take effect until next year, Justice Ian Pitfield also granted Insite an immediate exemption to federal drug laws, giving it legal grounds to continue operating. Several days later the federal government announced plans to appeal the decision to the B.C. Court of Appeal. On 15 January 2010, the B.C. Court of Appeal dismissed the federal government's appeal in a 2–1 ruling. Three weeks later the federal government announced that it would appeal to the Supreme Court of Canada. On February 10, some 150 people protested the federal government's decision to further appeal. The protesters barred Prime Minister Harper from attending a dress rehearsal for the Vancouver Chinatown Spring Festival Celebration. On February 12, The Canadian Union of Public Employees sent an open letter to Harper, urging him to accept the ruling of the lower courts and allow Insite to remain open.

Of nine interveners in the Supreme Court case, one supported the Conservative government's case to close the injection site: REAL Women of Canada, a social conservative organization. The other eight, including the Canadian Medical Association argued against the case for closure of the facility. The REAL Woman of Canada group argued that the site would discourage drug users from ceasing their habit, and that they would get "worse and worse until they die" while their families and communities suffered.

In May 2011 a lawyer for the Federal government told the Supreme Court that the government had not decided whether to continue or end support for Insite, contrary to previous statements by Minister of Health Tony Clement; that statement was derided in court as disingenuous by Joseph Arvay, a lawyer for PHS Community Services Society.

On September 29, 2011, the Supreme Court of Canada ruled unanimously in Canada (AG) v PHS Community Services Society that Clement's decision to withdraw Insite's exemption under the Controlled Drugs and Substances Act was "arbitrary, undermining the very purposes of the CDSA, which include public health and safety. It is also grossly disproportionate: the potential denial of health services and the correlative increase in the risk of death and disease to injection drug users outweigh any benefit that might be derived from maintaining an absolute prohibition on possession of illegal drugs on Insite’s premises." The Court ordered Clement to grant an exemption to Insite forthwith, allowing the facility to stay open indefinitely.

After the Supreme Court decision in 2011, the ruling majority Conservative party tabled a bill titled "The Respect for Communities Act", which would create a federal regulatory framework for supervised injection sites such as Insite. Bill C-65 includes provision for certification and inspections. It gives the federal Minister of Health sole authority for exemptions to drug laws, but would require support letters from provincial health and public safety ministers before a site can be licensed. Bill C-65 died with prorogation but its replacement, Bill C-2, was one of the first pieces of legislation tabled when the House resumed in Fall 2013. Bill C-2 is nearly identical to Bill C-65 but is slated to be considered by the Standing Committee on Public Safety, rather than the Standing Committee on Health. Once this legislation passes, Insite will have to meet new requirements in order to continue operating, and it will have to report on how the facility has affected local crime rates, and both public and individual health.
