= BC Housing Management Commission =

Canadian provincial Crown agency

British Columbia Housing Management Commission
- Founded: 1967
- Type: Crown Corporation
- Headquarters: Burnaby, British Columbia
- Owner: Government of British Columbia
- Board Chair: Lynn Stevenson
- Chief Executive Officer: Vincent Tong
- Website: www.bchousing.org

BC Housing is a Canadian provincial Crown Corporation responsible for provincially funded housing, including subsidized housing, and other housing services throughout British Columbia. The agency was founded in 1967 as the British Columbia Housing Management Commisson under the Ministry of Lands, Parks and Housing Act. It is governed under the British Columbia Housing Management Commission Regulation.

As of 2022, BC Housing reports to the Ministry of Housing and Municipal Affairs. Its head office is located in Burnaby, British Columbia, Canada. BC Housing administers the Provincial Rental Housing Corporation, a corporation created in 1961 that holds government-owned property for the purposes of social and low-cost housing.

Licensing & Consumer Services (Licensing, previously known as the Homeowner Protection Office) is a branch of BC Housing responsible for administering the Homeowner Protection Act. Under the act, BC Housing is responsible for licensing residential builders and building-envelope renovators; administering owner builder authorizations; track new home registrations, and carrying out research and education that benefits the residential construction industry and consumers.
