= Ann Livingston =

Ann Livingston (born November 30, 1954) is a harm reduction activist based in Vancouver, Canada. She is a co-founder of the Vancouver Area Network of Drug Users (VANDU) (formed in 1997), which advocates for people who actively use drugs to have a voice in public policy. In 1995, Livingston established an unsanctioned supervised injection facility called “Back Alley” in response to a rise in deaths linked to HIV/AIDS. In 2016, in response to overdose deaths tied to fentanyl, she co-founded another unsanctioned injection site called “OPS” (Overdose Prevention Site), which later received government funding and served as a model for sanctioned injection sites operated by the regional health authority.

Livingston was born in Nelson, British Columbia. She has five siblings. Her family moved around B.C. frequently during her childhood.

Livingston’s mother was a social worker and her father participated in street activism. In 1982, Livingston had a child who was born with cerebral palsy. Along with her parents’ influence, Livingston’s observations of how people treated her disabled son contributed to her embrace of grassroots activism later in life.

In 1993, Livingston, a single mother with three children moved from Vancouver Island to the City of Vancouver’s impoverished Downtown Eastside. Shortly after, she began a romantic relationship with Bud Osborn, a well-known published poet at the time. Together, the founded VANDU in 1997.
