= Homelessness in Vancouver =

Social crisis in Vancouver

Homelessness is a social crisis that has been rapidly accelerating in the Canadian city of Vancouver, British Columbia, over the last decade. According to the United Nations, homelessness can either be relative or absolute. Absolute homelessness describes people living in absence of proper physical shelter. Relative homelessness describes people living in poor conditions of health or security, including an absence of both personal safety and steady income despite having physical shelter to reside in. As of 2023, roughly 2,422 people in Vancouver are subject to one of these types of homelessness, or are transitioning between them.

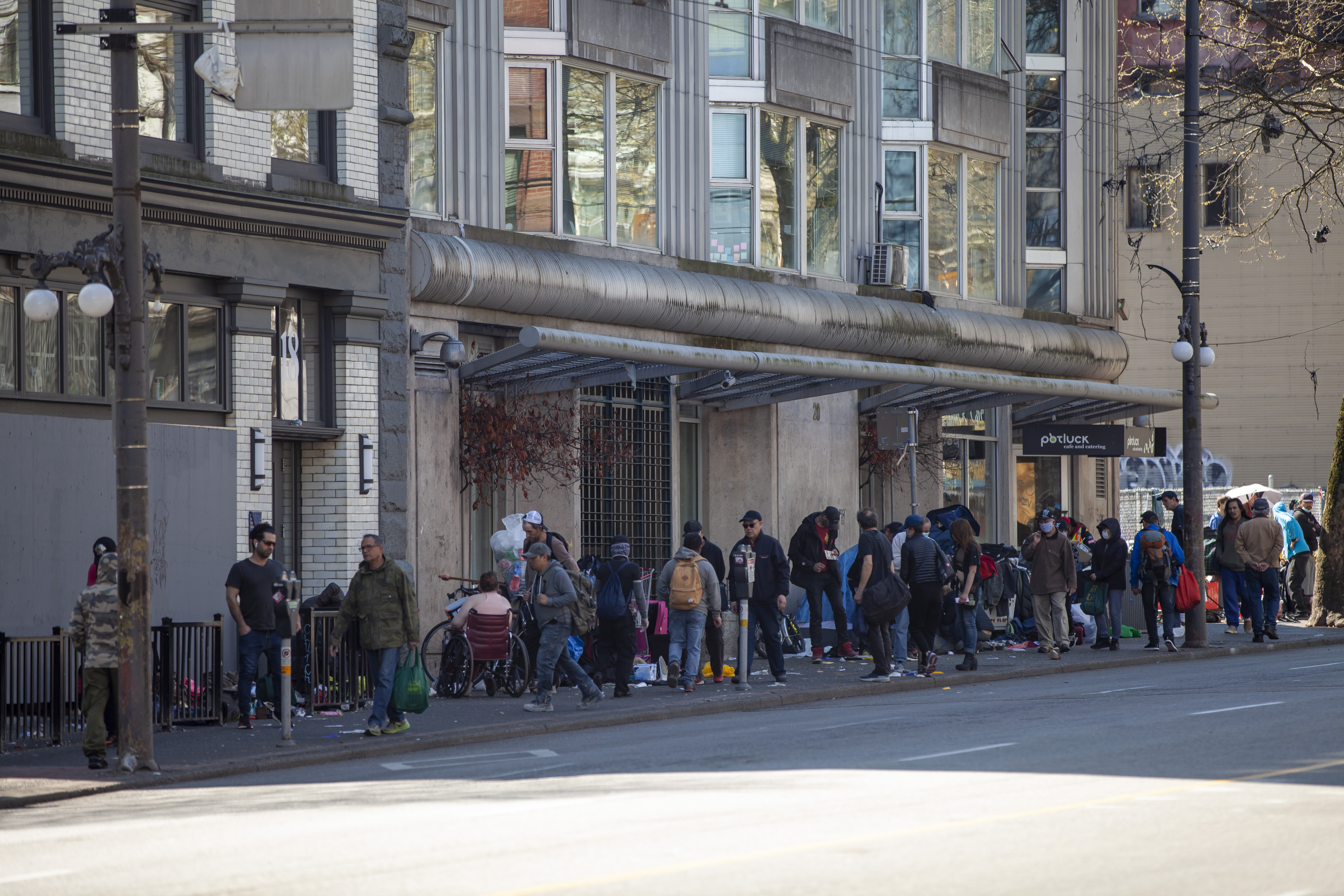
Homeless individuals in the Downtown Eastside

Homelessness as a social issue in Vancouver originated from federal funding cuts to affordable housing. After market housing increased, the cost of housing became one of Vancouver's main causes of homelessness, alongside lack of income. The homeless population in Vancouver is subjected to high amounts of crime-related victimization. There have been several approaches to reducing the homeless population in Greater Vancouver by the city and other organizations. Beginning in 2020, the rate of homelessness in Greater Vancouver has greatly increased, with a 32% increase documented between a three-year period from 2020 to 2023. British Columbia, as the only province without a deadly winter season (in southwestern coastal areas), sees many migrate from other provinces.

== History and demographics ==
Homelessness was not an issue in Vancouver until after the 1980s. Prior to then, there had generally been enough affordable housing provided by surpluses from the Canadian Mortgage and Housing Corporation (CMHC), which had been initiated in 1946 by the federal government. However, national affordable housing programs received funding cuts from the government during the 1980s. Total housing stock increased after the federal funding cuts, but it was from private sector development of market housing rather than affordable housing. Between the affordable housing cuts, and increase in market housing, real estate grew to be out of the price range of some lower-income groups.

Since 1999, rates of homelessness have continued to accelerate in Vancouver by 28 percent annually. The effects of homelessness have been felt most heavily in the Downtown Eastside, an area of Vancouver that has gained notoriety for crime and poverty. The outset of homelessness is not rigidly defined, except that it emerged as an issue of the city around the 1980s and 1990s, with the homeless count in 1999 being under 600 people. By 2002, the homelessness situation in Vancouver had grown to about 1,121 persons. From 2002 to 2005, the number of homeless in the Vancouver region went from 1,121 to 2,174 individuals, almost doubling across three years. Finally, 2,592 people were counted during an official 2008 one-day count. The rapid growth of homelessness in under ten years is an indicator as to why homelessness is considered a crisis in Vancouver, as it has continually grown despite many attempts to address the issue.

The ethnic spread of homeless people in Vancouver is unequal, with Indigenous people and those of European descent making up a large portion of the homeless. Indigenous people make up about 30 percent of Vancouver's homeless population while only comprising 2 percent of the total population of Greater Vancouver, and only 8 percent of the total homeless population identify themselves as not being Indigenous, European, or otherwise born in Canada. In contrast, the 2001 census indicates that visible minorities represent 36.9 percent of Greater Vancouver’s overall population. In Vancouver, the issue of homeless youth on the street has become apparent; however, it is difficult to get a number on the number of youth on the street as they tend to avoid shelters. The number of homeless senior citizens had nearly tripled between 2002 and 2005 in Greater Vancouver. As a result, numbers of homeless youth in Vancouver are underestimated. Homeless youth are defined as those who left home at the age of 16 and are up to 24 years old; however, most of Vancouver's street homeless are between 35 and 44. Adult homeless men usually fall between the ages of 25 and 44, and homeless women tend to be older. Figures for Canada say that about one-third of Canada's homeless population is defined as homeless youth. By 2008, half of Vancouver's homeless population had been homeless for over one year, and 90 percent of them were homeless by themselves without a partner, child, dog, or companion of any kind. Homeless youth in Vancouver tend to have lower rates of being alone, and the number of homeless youth for each gender is evenly split.

It was found in the 2011 Homeless Count by Metro Vancouver that the total number of homeless remained unchanged; on the other hand, street homelessness had decreased and shelter homelessness had increased, as well as family, women and youth homelessness.

In December 2016 the City of Vancouver decided to open community centres for overnight stays by homeless people. The centres were named warming centres for homeless people. The decision was criticized by families and staff and the program was discontinued in most centres. The complaint was that regular staff are not trained to deal with homeless people and are scared. Special boxes for discarded needles were not made available in warming centres.

== Causes ==
The two main causes of homelessness in Vancouver are lack of income and cost of housing. These two factors could be attributed to about 66 percent of Vancouver's homeless population according to a 2005 survey done by the City; however, this decreased to a total of 44 percent by 2008. This shows that Vancouver's reasons for homelessness have diversified in recent years, with some of the causes being attributed to situations of substance abuse.

=== Lack of income ===
This factor accounted for the largest part (about 44 percent) of Vancouver's homeless population in 2005. Although it was down to 25 percent in 2008, it still accounted for the largest portion of Vancouver's homeless. Welfare support, which is used by almost half of Vancouver's homeless population, still cannot provide enough for rental in many areas of the city. Despite this, income assistance from the government provides for much of the income of Vancouver's homeless, as well as supplementary income from work on the side such as searching bins, and panhandling.

=== Cost of housing ===
This factor accounted for the second largest part (about 22 percent) of Vancouver's homeless population in 2005 and was down to 19 percent 2008. There had been an increase of government support for social housing between 1994 and 2001; however, after 2001 until 2006 government support for social housing declined, so much so that, in 2006, the UN Committee on Economic, Social and Cultural Rights (UNCESCR) urged Canadian governments to address homelessness and inadequate housing as a national emergency. As a result, homelessness in Vancouver accelerated quickly. This marked by the increase of people on the street from the year 2002 to 2005 of 1,121 persons to 2,174 persons. In 2006 complications in Vancouver's housing market clouded support for social housing that had been re-announced by the government, leading to a shortage of social housing units affordable enough for low-income groups.

=== Displacement and gentrification in Chinatown ===
In recent years, Vancouver’s Chinatown has experienced rapid gentrification, contributing to the displacement of low-income residents and increasing homelessness risk among seniors. Many seniors in the area, in particular, elderly Chinese Canadians, live on fixed incomes, face language barriers, and depend on aging single-room occupancy (SRO) units or non-market housing. These buildings are often sold, re-built, or left in poor conditions, forcing long-term tenants to relocate with limited housing options. A 2023 city-funded study found that appropriate seniors’ housing in the Chinatown and Downtown Eastside areas were severely limited, with long waitlists and insufficient support services. Advocates argue that redevelopment has prioritized luxury condominiums and commercial revitalization over affordable housing, resulting in cultural erosion and exclusion of older Chinese residents. Intersectional factors such as age, race, class, and immigrant status further exacerbate these challenges. During the COVID-19 pandemic, incidents of anti-Asian crimes in the area also increased, heightening insecurity for seniors in precarious housing situations.

=== Closure of Riverview ===
The last factor in homelessness in Vancouver is the closure of the Riverview Mental Hospital. In the 1990s, patients were discharged, without shelter, and could only live on the streets of the Downtown Eastside.

== Health issues ==
There are many health-related issues that are associated with homelessness, including mental health issues, substance abuse, and sexually transmitted infection. Those in absolute homelessness are more susceptible to health problems; however, it is not limited to them and affects people in relative homelessness as well. In Vancouver, the number of homeless found on the street had grown by about 205 percent from 2002 to 2005, and it was noted that more homeless tend to sleep outdoors than in shelters. The difference between street or sheltered homeless was found to not have much of an effect on the outcome of total incidences of health issues, with a total of about 78 percent of Vancouver's homeless reporting one or more health issues of some kind. However, it was found that addiction played a larger role for homeless living on the street rather than a shelter. There is a 31× higher death rate for homeless females and a 9× higher death rate for males over the average Canadian mortality rates. In Vancouver, homeless men constitute about 70 percent of the homeless population. Substance abuse is not only a result of homelessness, but can be a cause as well, and sexually transmitted infections such as HIV are at increased risk of contraction for the homeless of Vancouver. Alcohol, marijuana, and crystal meth use are prevalent, and substance abuse along with crowding in shelters leads to an increased risk of contracting tuberculosis.

It was found in 2011 that access to food had become much more of a problem for street homeless, and that health conditions had generally worsened since the 2008 count.

== Crime-related issues ==
Victimization is when one is subject to damage to their person or property.

The homeless population in Vancouver is often subjected to various forms of victimization, which can include unhealthy gender-based relations as well as assault and other forms of violence. Out of a survey sample used by Mario Berti in his 2010 report entailing homelessness and victimization in Vancouver, it was found that 88 percent of the 196 homeless people surveyed reported victimization. The police were only notified of about 11 percent of incidents out of all of the victimized respondents to the survey. Furthermore, 40 percent of the cases were reported to be only damage to the person, 24 percent reported only property damage, and 35 percent of the cases were reported to have been both. Over half of the survey respondents, when asked, perceived that the police and justice system in Vancouver would disregard or not care about their situation.

=== Community response ===
Community response in Vancouver have sought to address the intertwined crises of homelessness and unregulated substance-use with increasing urgency. The city has collaborated with health agencies, non-profit agencies and peer-led outreach to provide low-barrier services, supportive housing and harm reduction programs. For example, the DTES has seen city efforts that "support community-based initiatives and de-stigmatize mental health and substance use" by working in "partnership with people affected by the crisis, non-profit and advocacy groups, urban Indigenous organizations... and people who use drugs". At the same time, supportive housing trials like the Chez Soi prohect have demonstrated the feasibility of providing housing first to people experiencing both homelesness and substance-use or mental health challenges.

Despite these efforts, the stigma experienced by people who are unhoused or use drugs remains a barrier. More broadly, systematic reviews conclude that stigma “creates barriers to essential care and resources” for people experiencing homelessness, compounding health and social risks. This stigma is reinforced when public discourse and spatial geography divide ‘privileged’ parts of the city from neighbourhoods such as the DTES, so that those with stable homes and more resources effectively live in a context of avoidance rather than shared community responsibility.

In many ways, the spatial and social separation of housing-secure populations from the realities of homelessness underpins both the stigma and the uneven community response. Those who live in more stable, privileged neighbourhoods may seldom interact with or even see the day-to-day lives of unhoused people or people who use drugs, which can reinforce stereotypes and distance. At the same time, community organizations in the DTES report that frontline services are overwhelmed by overlapping crises of housing loss, substance-use toxicity and structural marginalisation: “housing and shelter supply” is under pressure, and substances in the unregulated market are increasingly deadly. A more integrated community response would require bridging the divide; reducing stigma by increasing contact, collaboration and understanding and recognizing homelessness and drug use as structural issues requiring systemic solutions rather than moral failings.

== Solutions ==
The Greater Vancouver Regional Steering Committee on Homelessness (RSCH), a coalition of community organizations and the municipal, provincial and federal governments, established in 2000, developed the 10-year Regional Homelessness Plan entitled Three Ways to Home with funding from the National Homelessness Initiative. The Plan was updated in 2003. Three elements of the "solution to homelessness are affordable housing, support services and adequate income." Since 2011 Metro Vancouver manages the Federal Homelessness Partnering Strategy fund with the RSCH as the Community Advisory Board. The Plan was updated in September 2013.

Reducing the number of people at-risk of absolute homelessness in Vancouver is one of the best proposed solutions, which means addressing those in relative or near relative homelessness. This could be done with increased welfare support from the government, which had a 13 percent increase in number of users from 2005 to 2008.

The homeless population of Vancouver has become victim of their own society.

There is a widespread number of government, non-profit, charity, and religious organizations dedicated to giving aid to the homeless population of Vancouver, but they are not consistent in supply and can be geographically scattered.

In 2006, Greater Vancouver was spending about $51 million per year to maintain giving aid to the street homeless population as it was; however, it was estimated that about $250 million of spending a year would be needed to fix the crisis.

Also in 2006, Project Civil City was initiated by Vancouver's mayor, Sam Sullivan, in order to deal with issues of homelessness and drugs to try to make the city more appealing for the 2010 Winter Olympics. This project included social housing and care initiatives, despite causing some controversy in Vancouver.

In 2007, large amounts of land around Greater Vancouver and Victoria were purchased by the provincial government with the intention of creating affordable housing out of the single-room-occupancy hotels on the land.

A group known as Pivot Legal Society was highly active in convincing the provincial government to purchase the hotels. Pivot Legal Society has been active in promoting various solutions towards dealing with homelessness and other social issues in Vancouver since its founding in 2000.

Metro Vancouver has completed various studies, including the 2011 Pathways Out of Homelessness Study, which have been done in order to better understand the options that can be used to solve the homelessness situation.

== See also ==
- Downtown Eastside
- Gentrification of Vancouver
- Homelessness in Canada
- Poverty in Canada
