= Bud Osborn =

Canadian poet and activist (1947–2014)

Bud Osborn (4 August 1947 – 6 May 2014) was a poet, community organizer, and activist in Vancouver's Downtown Eastside. Following his prolonged struggle with heroin addiction and alcohol dependency, Osborn became a founding member of the Vancouver Area Network of Drug Users and advocated for the creation of a legal supervised injection site. His poetry commented on poverty and homelessness in Vancouver.

== Life ==
Osborn was born as Walton Homer Osborn III in Battle Creek, Michigan, to Patricia Osborn (née Barnes) and Walton Homer Osborn II. He spent his childhood in a rough area of Toledo, Ohio, where a neighborhood friend nicknamed him "Bud". His father, who had been a pilot and German prisoner in World War II, was a reporter for the Toledo Blade. Walton Osborn committed suicide in jail when Bud Osborn was three years old. His mother, who also served in the US military, reportedly married seven times. At the age of four, Osborn saw her get raped by a stranger whom she brought home from a drinking establishment. He made his first suicide attempt a year later, throwing himself off the porch at his home. At 15, he attempted suicide by taking Aspirin.

Osborn got into sports, particularly basketball and running, during high school. It was there that he began to read and write poetry. He entered Ohio Northern University but dropped out after two years. He married and had a son. They moved to his wife's hometown, New York city, but the marriage failed. He started using hard drugs. In 1969, he left the U.S. and moved with his family to Toronto in order to avoid draft for the Vietnam War. His wife Julie and son Aeron later left for Oregon. He would be estranged from his son Aeron for three decades. In 1970, he published his first chapbook of poetry by the Toronto Coach House Press.

== Downtown Eastside ==
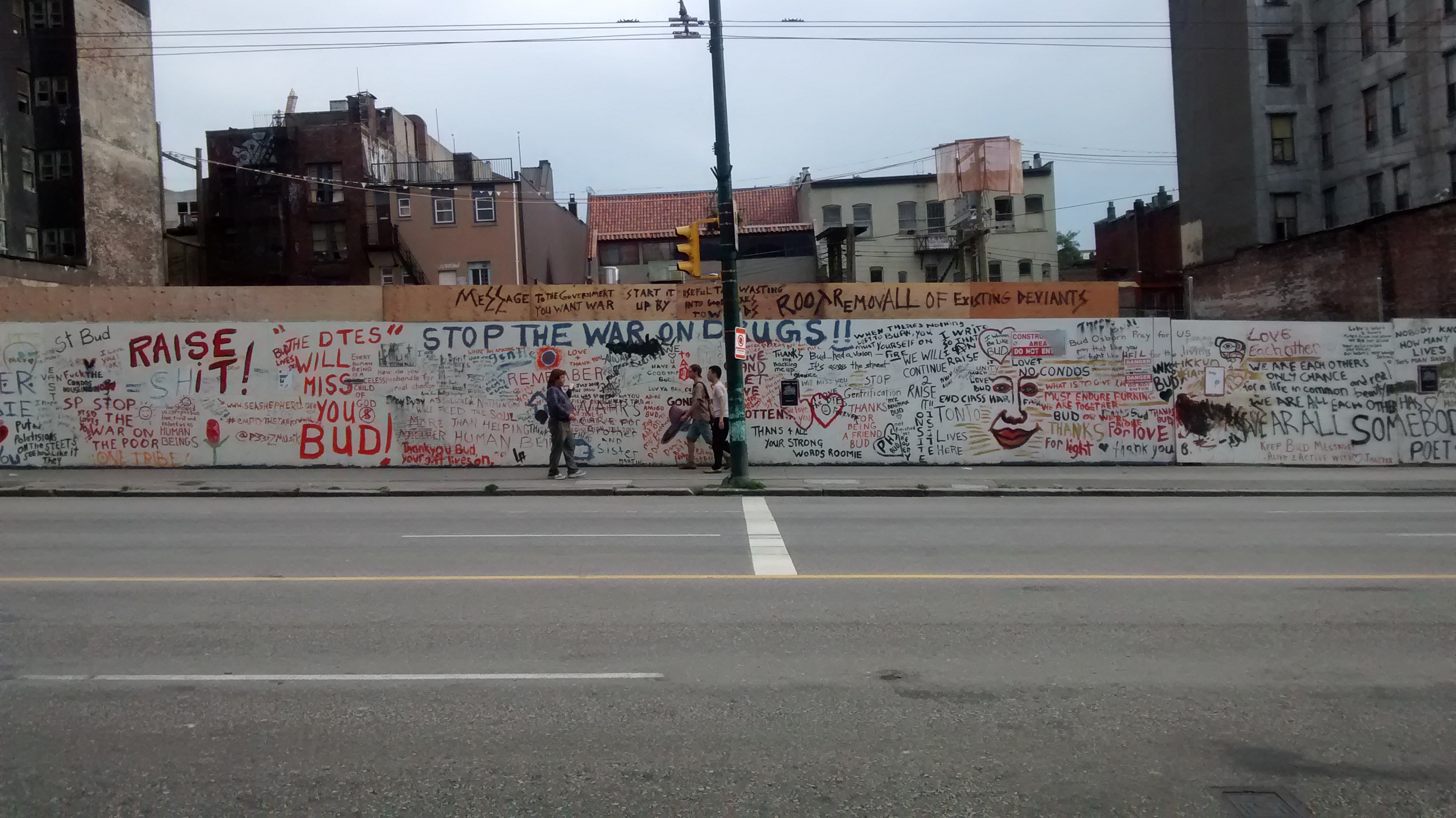
Memorial wall for Osborn in the Downtown Eastside (no longer existing)

In 1986, he moved to Vancouver with his new female partner Cuba Dwyer, who eventually moved back to the United States. They ended up in the Downtown Eastside. Osborn got arrested for stealing books to support his heroin addiction and on one occasion almost died of a drug overdose. Years later, with the help of a Roman Catholic priest he overcame his heroin and alcohol dependency. In 1997, he met Ann Livingston, with whom he had a romantic relationship, and who was involved in running an illegal supervised drug injection site. Together they founded the Vancouver Area Network of Drug Users.

In 1998, Osborn was appointed to the Vancouver/Richmond Health Board, where he advocated for legal safe injection sites, working closely with MP Libby Davies. He and Livingston helped the leadership of the Portland Hotel Society, the nonprofit that ran the housing project where Osborn lived, organize the display of thousands of white crosses in Oppenheimer Park, representing the people who were dying in the Downtown Eastside. Following that protest and many subsequent ones, the Portland Hotel Society opened Insite, the only legal supervised injection site in North America, in the Downtown Eastside in 2003.

After Insite was opened, Osborn shifted to opposing gentrification of the Downtown Eastside. He died on 6 May 2014 at the age of 66 after being hospitalized for pneumonia and a heart condition, and was remembered at a street memorial attended by 200 people.

== Bibliography ==
- Osborn, Bud (1970). Black Azure. Coach House Press.
- Osborn, Bud (1995). Lonesome Monsters. Anvil Press. ISBN 1-895636-08-6.
- Osborn, Bud (1998). Oppenheimer Park. Sign of the Times. ISBN 0-9683337-0-2.
- Osborn, Bud (1999). Keys to Kingdoms. Get to the Point Publishing. ISBN 0-9697112-1-2.
- Osborn, Bud (1999). Hundred Block Rock. Arsenal Pulp Press. ISBN 1-55152-074-5.
- Osborn, Bud (2005). Sign of the Times. Anvil Press. ISBN 1-895636-71-X.
- Boyd, Susan; MacPherson, Donald; Osborn, Bud (2009). Raise Shit! Social Action Saving Lives. Fernwood Publishing. ISBN 978-1-55266-327-1.
