= Garth Mullins =

Canadian drug activist

- Education: University of Victoria, London School of Economics
- Occupations: Journalist, podcaster
- Organization: Vancouver Area Network of Drug Users
- Known for: Drug activism, podcasting
- Awards: The Hillman Prize (2020)
- Website: www.garthmullins.com

Garth Mullins is a Canadian radio producer, author, activist, methadone user, and musician. He is the host of the Crackdown podcast and a board member of Vancouver Area Network of Drug Users.

His podcast won The Canadian Hillman Prize in 2020.

== Early life ==
Mullins grew up in Yellowknife, Northwest Territories in the 1970s.

He was bullied in school about his albinism. During high school he worked in banking and construction; after high school he worked in a mine in Northwest Territories. Being blind was a barrier to employment opportunities, prompting him to return to studies at the University of Victoria. While studying, he hosted a radio show called The War Measures Act and took heroin for the first time at the age of 19. After graduating from the University of Victoria, he studied political sociology at the London School of Economics, while writing articles for the Vancouver Sun.

== Later life and views ==
Mullins has hosted the monthly Crackdown podcast since 2019. His team won The Canadian Hillman Prize in 2020.

A previous intravenous user of heroin, Mullins is a user of methadone. He speaks about his own use of drugs on the Crackdown podcast hoping to inprove public education. He serves on the board of directors of the Vancouver Area Network of Drug Users. Mullins describes how he sees the war on drugs as still affecting people in contemporary times. He is an advocate for the legalisation of street drugs, and has campaigned against the planned expansion in scope of Canada's Medical Assistance in Dying permissibility to include people with disabilities.

Mullins performs as a musician in the band Legally Blind.

Mullins' first book, Crackdown: Surviving and Resisting the War on Drugs, was published by Penguin Random House Canada on April 15, 2025 He was interviewed by Globe and Mail reporter, Andrea Woo, at the Vancouver Writers' Fest on April 16, 2025. Their discussion focused on: "a radical reimagining of our approach to drug use, [leading] us to envisage a system that helps rather than punishes."

In 2026, Mullins endorsed Avi Lewis in that year's federal NDP leadership race.
