= Asahi (baseball team) =

Baseball team of Japanese-Canadians

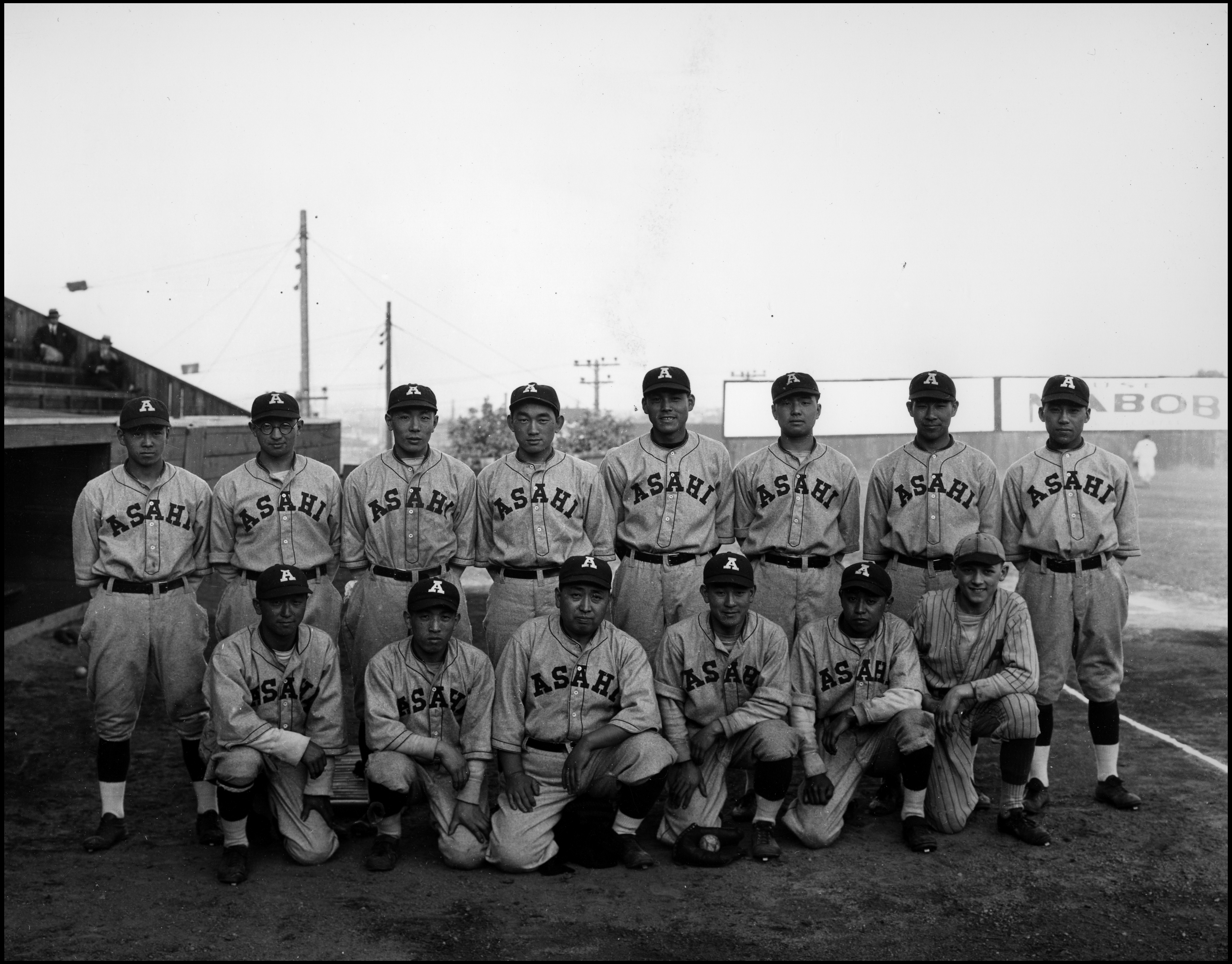
- Logo 1929 Asahi baseball team

Information
- Location: Vancouver, British Columbia, Canada
- Ballpark: Powell Street Grounds
- Founded: 1914
- Folded: 1941

The Asahi was a Japanese-Canadian baseball team of amateur and semi-professional players that was based in Vancouver from 1914 to 1941. The team won many league championships, particularly in the 1930s.

== History ==
The Asahi was established as a senior team in 1914, under its first manager and coach, Matsujiro Miyazaki. Team members included both issei and nisei. These include the notable players: Yo (Yoshitaro) Horii, Mickey (Hatsu) Kitagawa, and Tom Matoba. After 1918, Asahi was the sole Japanese Canadian team after the Vancouver Nippon team disbanded. Many of Vancouver Nippon's players joined the Asahi. The team was based in Vancouver's Oppenheimer Park—originally known as the Powell Street Grounds—in the city's Japantown.

Coach Miyazaki, who was raised in Japan, was largely influential to the team's enduring success. He incorporated Japanese strategies into his coaching, which was dubbed "smartball" or "brainball" by the media, due to its reliance on speed and defense as opposed to power and heavy hitting. This strategy was devised to capitalize on the player’s small frames. Bunting, cutoff and base-stealing were among their most popular strategies, and emphasized teamwork to create an impenetrable defense.

=== Championships ===
- In 1918, the newly formed team entered the City International Baseball League and against numerous Caucasian teams.
- In 1919 the Asahi won their first local title by winning the pennant of the Vancouver International League.
- While under Miyazaki's guidance, the team reached their goal of winning the Terminal League Championship in 1926. Their success continued into the 1930s with them also winning in 1930 and 1933.
- In 1937–1941, the team won five consecutive Pacific Championships.
- In 1938 the team won a Triple League Championship.
- In 1939 and 1940 the team won the Burrard League Championship.

=== Racism ===
Asahi was active during a time of harsh anti-Asian racism. While players were praised in the media, they experienced racism in their everyday lives including limited employment opportunities and segregation in places like movie theatres. The success of the Asahi, in spite of these hardships, made the team a symbol of Japanese Canadian perseverance and cultural participation. The team has contributed to closing off the intergenerational gap between the issei and the children born during the interwar period. The team helped to mediate the relationship between Japanese Canadians and the white community by creating a common interest that brought the two together. During a time of prominent racial discrimination, Oppenheimer Park became a place where barriers fell as the Asahi and Occidental fans would support one another. The Asahi's style of play and determination on the field gave them "grudging respect" from European-Canadian fans.

After the attack on Pearl Harbor, Canada invoked the War Measures Act and all Canadians of Japanese descent were registered as 'enemy aliens' and forcibly moved in internment camps. This resulted in the disbanding of the Asahi team. They never played as a team again.

== Legacy ==
The team was inducted into the Canadian Baseball Hall of Fame in 2003, and the BC Sports Hall of Fame in 2005. The team was designated an Event of National Historic Significance on August 26, 2008. A plaque honoring the team was unveiled in Oppenheimer Park on September 18, 2011, the 70th anniversary of the team's last game. In 2014, the Japanese Canadian Cultural Centre in Toronto donated a small swatch of material from a surviving original Asahi jersey in their collection to the Six String Nation project. The swatch was mounted on the front of the guitar strap that supports the guitar at the heart of the project. The donation was publicly unveiled during a pre-game ceremony on August 10, 2014 at the Rogers Centre during the Toronto Blue Jays annual Canada Baseball Day festivities, where the guitar and strap were posed with on the field by Blue Jays mascot "Ace", Babe Ruth's granddaughter Ruth Tosetti and then Blue Jay Munenori Kawasaki. On April 24, 2019, the team was honoured with a postage stamp issued by Canada Post.

=== In media ===
In December 2014, a Japanese studio released a period drama film called The Vancouver Asahi starring Satoshi Tsumabuki and Kazuya Kamenashi. The film premiered at the Vancouver International Film Festival, receiving the Top Audience Award, and was released in theatres on December 20.

A 2003 documentary about the team, Sleeping Tigers: The Asahi Baseball Story, was directed by Jari Osborne. Produced by the National Film Board of Canada, the documentary combines archival film and dramatic recreations, along with interviews with the last of the Asahi. The 50-minute film garnered four awards including a Rockie Award for Best Sports Program at the Banff Television Festival and a Golden Sheaf Award.

Heart of a Champion is a 2016 novel by Ellen Schwartz. The story is about a boy named Kenji "Kenny" Sakamoto who aspires to be a baseball player for the Vancouver Asahi, but his dreams were crushed when the Canadian government issued an order for all Japanese Canadians to be placed in internment camps, then got permission to clear the land and make a baseball field. The novel has won a Silver Birch Award.

On February 19, 2019, a Heritage Minute was released, depicting an Asahi baseball game and the subsequent internment of a player alongside other Japanese Canadians. The short segment was narrated by the last surviving member of the team, Koichi Kaye Kaminishi (11 January 1922 - 28 September 2024), and novelist Joy Kogawa.

== Notable alumni ==
Matsujiro Miyasaki was the team's first manager. He was known for his "Small Ball" strategy, which included their signature double steal. He emphasized speed and flawless defense.

Roy Yamamura was a regular with the team from 1924-1941. He became the team's manager in 1938 while he continued to play for the club. He was a fan favourite due to his prolific base stealing and defensive ability, which earned him the nickname "the dancing shortstop". He is the only Japanese Canadian to play for the Arrows team in Vancouver's top division for two years.

Kaye Koichi Kaminishi was the last known survivor from the team. He played between 1939 and 1941. He died on September 28, 2024, aged 102.

Kaz Suga was a star player during the team's last season in 1941. He had a batting average of 0.395 and was an exception to the team's "smartball" playstyle.

Junji Ito was one of the Asahi Baseball team's legendary players. He became known as the 'King of Bunting' as his batting average climbed to over 0.400 and on the bases, his reactions were almost instant. He modelled the "smartball" strategy to perfection.
