= Drug User Liberation Front =

Canadian addiction organization

The Drug User Liberation Front (DULF) is a Canadian compassion club in Vancouver, British Columbia, that aims to advocate for and provide safe supply to drug users in Vancouver. The organization was founded in 2020 by Jeremy Kalicum and Eris Nyx and operated out of the Downtown Eastside, where it distributed heroin, cocaine and methamphetamine that had been tested for impurities at cost. DULF was involved in protest actions in 2020 and 2021 and began regular operations of its compassion club in 2022. DULF's goal is to reduce drug overdose deaths due to the ongoing opioid epidemic. In 2025, Kalicum and Nyx were found guilty of drug trafficking by the BC Supreme Court as DULF's unlawful distribution of drugs was not covered by the exemptions granted to the group, though the sentence was suspended pending a constitutional challenge. In 2026, a BC supreme court judge found the relevant portions of the Controlled Drugs and Substances Act to be unconstitutional and consequently discarded the conviction.

== Operations ==
DULF operated by buying drugs through the dark web, testing the substances, and selling them to its members. There were 43 or 47 members, depending on the source. Nyx estimated DULF's annual purchase was in the hundreds of thousands of dollars. DULF bought from an anonymous seller in Canada to avoid international trafficking charges. It paid with cryptocurrency and the substances were delivered by mail to the post office for pickup.

Drug testing for DULF was done at the University of Victoria and UBC.

DULF worked side by side with Vancouver Area Network of Drug Users.

== History ==
DULF's first public drug distribution was in June 2020. On April 14, 2021, activists associated with DULF gave out boxes of heroin, cocaine, and methamphetamine that had been tested and labelled with information about their composition.

In July, DULF enlisted city councillor Jean Swanson to hand out drugs in front of a Vancouver Police Department station. Early on, DULF built itself off of crowdfunding and collaboration with Vancouver Coastal Health, the BC Centre on Substance Use at UBC, and the Canadian Drug Policy Coalition at Simon Fraser University.

In 2021, Vancouver City Hall voted to support DULF and Vancouver Coastal Health began giving it $200,000 in annual funding for harm reduction.

In August 2021, DULF proposed to Health Canada to obtain a Section 56 exemption to the Controlled Drugs and Substances Act. It requested to be allowed either to buy drugs from a licensed, regulated provider or keep buying from the dark web. In 2022, Health Canada rejected DULF's proposal over DULF's insistence on providing drugs without a doctor's diagnosis, concerns about street diversion of the drugs being handed out, and the lack of an authorized provider. Despite this, in the summer of 2022, DULF began operating its compassion club.

In October 2023, Vancouver Police raided DULF, arrested Kalicum and Nyx, and shut down the storefront operation.

As public opinion turned against safe-supply in the Downtown Eastside, Conservative leader Pierre Poilievre called it a "disgrace" that the B.C. government was supporting DULF.

On October 15, 2024, DULF announced that it would launch a constitutional challenge of Canada's Controlled Drugs and Substances Act after the raid of its storefront and the arrests of Kalicum and Nyx, arguing that by shutting down DULF's operations, the Section 7 right to life, liberty and security of the person and the Section 15 right to guaranteed equality of their users was violated.

In 2025, Kalicum and Nyx were found guilty of drug trafficking. Justice Catherine Murray commented "They want to save lives", but the legal exemptions granted to DULF from drug laws did not cover selling the substances to members and health ministers are prohibited by federal law from granting exemptions when drugs are obtained illegally. Their sentencing was suspended pending the verdict of their constitutional challenge. On September 29, 2026, Murray ruled that the provision of the Controlled Drugs and Substances Act used to convict Kalicum and Nyx was unconstitutional because it prevented non-medical safer supply programs from operating during the toxic drug crisis and violated Charter rights. In light of her ruling, Murray stayed the convictions and declined to impose incarceration, while giving the federal government a six-month window to revise the law.
