= Crackdown (podcast) =

Canadian podcast

Cast and voices
- Hosted by: Garth Mullins

Publication
- Original release: 2019

Related
- Website: crackdownpod.com

Crackdown is a Canadian monthly podcast first launched in 2019. The podcast was created and hosted by drug users and interrogates Canadian and global drug policy from the perspective of drug user activists who are the most impacted by these policies and fight to change them. The show is hosted by journalist Garth Mullins who talks about his own former drug use on the show.

== Critical reception ==
The podcast won the Third Coast International Audio Festival's Impact award in 2019 and The Sidney Hillman Foundation's Canadian Hillman Prize in 2020.
