= Pivot Legal Society =

Canadian organization

- Abbreviation: PLS
- Formation: 2000
- Type: Legal Society
- Legal status: active
- Purpose: advocate and public voice, educator and network
- Headquarters: Vancouver, British Columbia's Downtown Eastside.
- Region served: Vancouver, British Columbia's Downtown Eastside Canada
- Official language: English; French

Pivot Legal Society is a legal advocacy organization based in Vancouver, British Columbia's Downtown Eastside. Pivot was founded in 2001 with a stated goal to represent and defend the interests of marginalized communities affected by poverty and social exclusion. It accomplishes this through litigation and advocacy directed at government.

== Hope in Shadows ==
Hope in Shadows is a photography contest organized by Pivot Legal Society, for residents of the Downtown Eastside since 2003. Every summer, up to 200 residents are given single-use cameras and encouraged to capture their community and their lives through images. The contest is designed to raise awareness about life in the Downtown Eastside, presenting reality from a distinctly personal point of view. Forty photographs are chosen by a panel of Vancouver artists and photographers, which are put on display on the street outside the Carnegie Community Centre. Here, local residents can vote to select the winning entries, which are compiled in an annual calendar, sold by residents on the streets of Vancouver. In 2010 216 local residents received job training to sell the 2011 Hope in Shadows calendar. More than $130,000 was earned by licensed street vendors selling 2011 calendars. The Hope in Shadows book won the 2008 City of Vancouver Book Award in October 2008 and has now sold more than 5,000 copies on the streets (if they had been sold in bookstores it would be an official B.C. Best Seller).
