= Vancouver Area Network of Drug Users =

Organization

Vancouver Area Network of Drug Users (VANDU)
- Founded: 1997
- Legal status: Non-profit organization
- Purpose: Drug users rights, drug policy reform, drug policy, human rights, harm reduction.
- Region served: Downtown Eastside, Vancouver, Canada
- Website: www.vandu.org

The Vancouver Area Network of Drug Users or VANDU is a not-for-profit organization and advocacy group based in Vancouver, British Columbia, Canada. The group believes that all drug users should have their own rights and freedoms. The group's members have been actively involved in lobbying for support of Insite, North America's first safe injection site, located in the Downtown Eastside of Vancouver.

Its board of directors consists entirely of current and former drug addicts. It was co-founded by Ann Livingston and Bud Osborn. Livingston had previously established a short-lived injection site called "Back Alley" on Powell Street in 1995.

== Background ==
VANDU was created in September 1997, to advocate for the delivery of health care services to drug users living in Vancouver who had been exposed to increasing rates of hepatitis C and HIV as a result of sharing needles, and to address risks to their health, such as drug overdose. It has operated an unauthorized drug consumption site and provided assisted illegal drug use for about four years until it was shut down in 2014.

A few dozen people first met in Oppenheimer Park on 9 September 1997 in response to messages posted by Livingston on utility poles throughout the Downtown Eastside. The assembled group of people decided to form an organization, and adopted the name Vancouver Area Network of Drug Users a year later. One of the attendees was Donald MacPherson, who later became drug-policy coordinator for Vancouver municipal government, and who also established the Canadian Drug Policy Coalition.

Membership grew to about 100 individuals in a few months, and eventually to over 2,000. The organization's membership is open to all individuals, but those elected to the board of directors must be current or former addicts, and votes at the organization's meetings may only be cast by current or former addicts.

== City of Vancouver grant misdirection ==
VANDU was given a $320,000 grant from the City of Vancouver in 2022 to provide street cleaning services in the Hastings Street encampment. Questions were raised when VANDU couldn't be seen working and street cleanliness continued to deteriorate. The organization eventually admitted to diverting grant intended for street cleaning into its general funds. $160,000 of the grant was paid out, however the City of Vancouver terminated the contract when services were not delivered as expected.. Ultimately, VANDU did release a financial report on their work, which showed that a significant portion of funds was dedicated to employment opportunities for DTES residents to support in keeping the block safer, particularly from fires. The city council voted to deny VANDU a $7,500 grant for arts program in 2023 for the gross misuse of public funds in 2022 making it the only grant out of 84 grants recommended by city staff to be denied by city council. After this $7500 funding was cut, a public fundraiser raised more than $10,000 to replace it.

== Actions and services ==
The organization also engages in local issues pertaining to Downtown Eastside area residents.

VANDU defends harm reduction services and supervised injection facilities. In recent years, VANDU has been engaging with the Drug User Liberation Front (DULF) to provide "safe supply" services. The group handed out cocaine, meth and heroin to users in July 2021 in which city councilor Jean Swanson participated in the distribution. Washington Examiner said it's uncertain if substances distributed by VANDU was obtained lawfully. The DULF founders Jeremy Kalicum and Eris Nyx have been charged with possession with intent to distribute in May 2024. The pair had sourced the illicit drugs that was distributed by DULF and VANDU together through the dark web. A legal judicial review on the Canadian government's rejection to sanction DULF and VANDU's compassion club has not yet been decided as of March 2025.

== Select publications ==
VANDU and the groups' members have also contributed to scholarly, peer-reviewed research on the lived realities of drug users and on the impacts of drug policies.

·The power of people who use drugs as mass media influencers in changing public opinion during the global overdose epidemic

·Activism and scientific research: 20 years of community action by the Vancouver area network of drug users

·Police seizure of drugs without arrest among people who use drugs in Vancouver, Canada, before provincial ‘decriminalization’ of simple possession: a cohort study

·Creating safe, inclusive spaces for hospital-based health care staff and people who use drugs: an exploratory qualitative study in Vancouver, Canada

·Building New Approaches to Risk Reduction With Social Networks and People Who Smoke Illegal Drugs From Participatory Community-Based Research''
