= Oppenheimer Park =

Park in Vancouver, British Columbia, Canada

Coordinates: 49.282675°N 123.094254°W

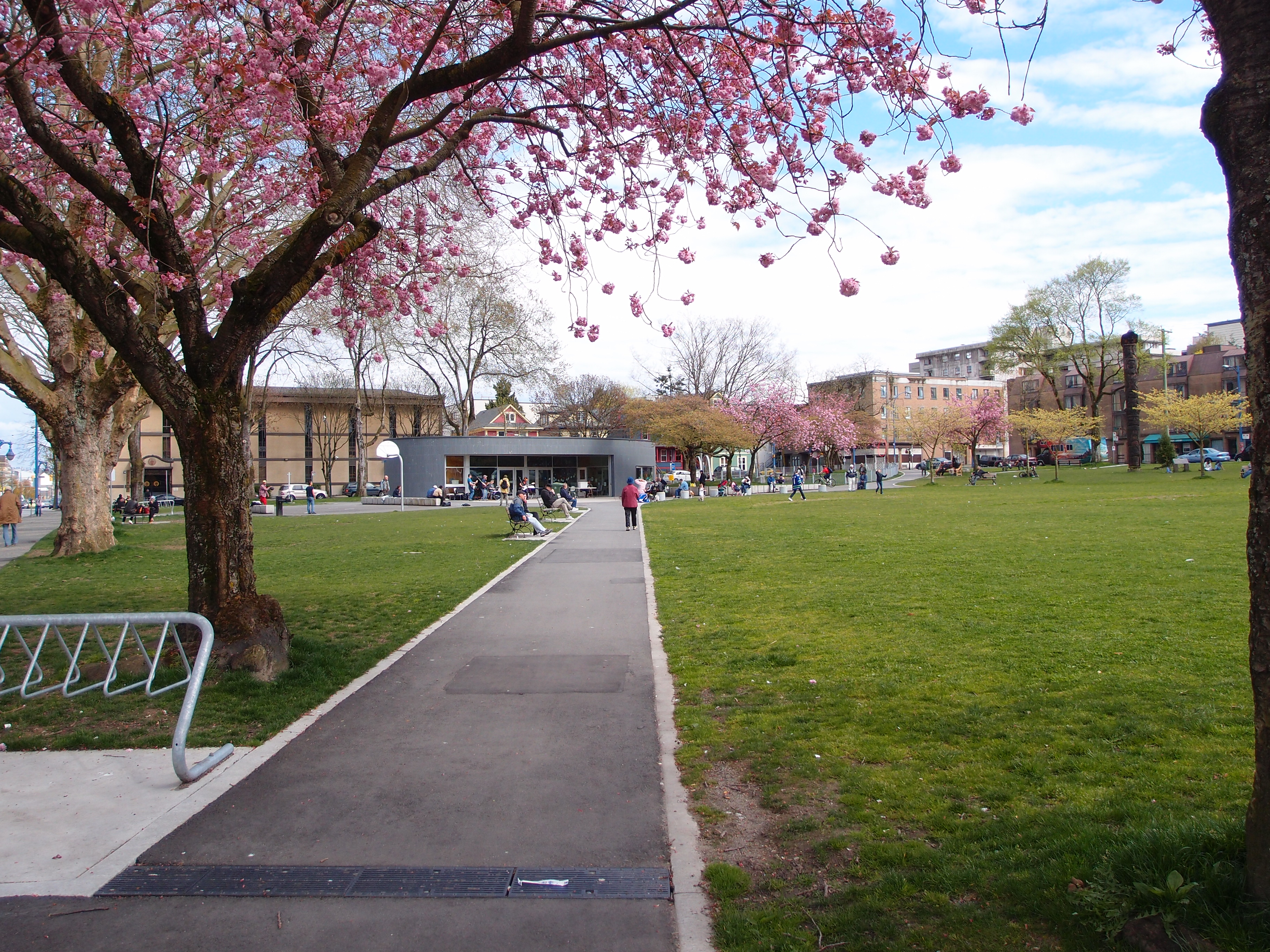
- Interactive map of Oppenheimer Park
- Type: Public Park
- Location: 400 Powell Street, Vancouver, British Columbia
- Created: 1902
- Operator: City of Vancouver

Oppenheimer Park is a park located in the historic Japantown (Paueru-Gai) in the Downtown Eastside, Vancouver, British Columbia, Canada.

== History ==
The park was opened in 1902 as the Powell Street Grounds by Vancouver's second mayor, David Oppenheimer, whom it was later renamed in honour of. The park is bounded by Jackson and Dunlevy Avenues, and Powell and East Cordova Streets. The park's facilities include a softball field, a basketball hoop, a children's playground, and a community centre with bathrooms, meeting space, and public computer access. The park employs two full-time activity coordinators and several part-time staff.

Historically, the park is most notable as being the site of one of the large demonstrations of striking workers during the events of Bloody Sunday in 1938. The Asahi baseball team used the park as its home field prior to World War II.

The park remained a popular middle-class family destination until the late 1980s, when crack cocaine trade and abuse began to dominate the park's usage. Since 2004, initiatives by the Vancouver Police and the Strathcona Business Improvement Association have attempted to return the park to its original image of safe recreation, with some success. The park was upgraded in 2010 with reconfiguration of the pathways and additions of a playground, a basketball hoop and a new field house.

== Protests and occupations ==
=== First Nations protest, 2014 ===
In July 2014, members of the First Nations community occupied Oppenheimer Park by creating a makeshift tent city, in protest of the city of Vancouver's attempt to evict homeless people that had been living in the park. Protesters cited the fact that Vancouver, including its parkland, is unceded First Nations' land and the B.C. Supreme Court decision in 2009, which stated that homeless persons are allowed to camp in a public park if no alternative shelters are available.

The protesters and campers were given deadline to vacate the park on October 15, 2014 after injunction was granted to the Vancouver Park Board to evict the protesters from the site. Over 100 tents remained at the park after the deadline, but the protesters and campers were removed from park and five people were arrested on October 16, 2014 for resisting to vacate the park.

=== Homeless encampment, 2020 ===
During the late 2010s, it was the site of a large homeless encampment. The encampment was dismantled on May 9, 2020, and the park has since been fenced off, after a ministerial order was issued in response to the COVID-19 pandemic. The Vancouver Park Board initially planned for phased re-opening of the park, but has decided to close the park indefinitely due to repeated break-ins and vandalism to its park building. As of summer 2021, the park is beginning to re-open in phases.

== Events ==
- Powell Street Festival — Vancouver's longest running community celebration
- HomeGround Festival
- Asahi Tribute Baseball game
- Endless Summer Festival
