= List of municipal and regional parks in British Columbia =

This is a list of notable municipal and regional parks in British Columbia, Canada.

== City and municipal parks ==
- Beacon Hill Park (Victoria)
- Beecher Park (Burnaby)
- Central Park (Burnaby)
- Cloverdale Fairgrounds (Surrey)
- Como Lake Park (Coquitlam)
- Deer Lake (Burnaby)
- Douglas Park (Langley)
- Dr. Sun Yat-Sen Classical Chinese Garden (Vancouver)
- Forests for the World (Prince George)
- Falaise Park (Vancouver)
- Fraser River Heritage Park (Mission)
- Grouse Mountain Regional Park (District of North Vancouver)
- Hastings Park (Vancouver)
- Hillcrest Park (Vancouver)
- Hinge Park (Vancouver)
- Kensington Park (Burnaby)
- Knox Mountain Park (Kelowna)
- Lighthouse Park (West Vancouver)
- Lynn Canyon Park (District of North Vancouver)
- McAuley Park (Vancouver)
- Minoru Park (Richmond)
- Mystic Vale (University of Victoria, Oak Bay)
- Oppenheimer Park (Vancouver)
- Mundy Park (Coquitlam)
- Paddlewheel Park (Prince George)
- Robert Burnaby Park (Burnaby)
- Queen Elizabeth Park (Vancouver)
- Riverside Park (Kamloops)
- Rocky Point Park (Port Moody)
- Stanley Park (Vancouver)
- Stuart Park (Kelowna)
- Sunrise Park (Vancouver)
- Terra Nova Adventure Park (Richmond)
- Thetis Lake (Saanich)
- Thunderbird Park (Victoria)
- Town Centre Park (Coquitlam)
- Vanier Park (Vancouver)
- Victory Square (Vancouver)
- Wendy Poole Park (Vancouver)

== Regional parks ==
- Belcarra Regional Park (Belcarra, Indian Arm)
- Burnaby Lake Regional Park (Burnaby)
- Capilano River Regional Park (North/West Vancouver)
- Cascade Falls Regional Park (NE of Mission, FVRD Electoral Area "F")
- Coats Marsh Regional Park (Gabriola Island)
- Derby Reach Regional Park (Langley)
- Descanso Bay Regional Park (Gabriola Island)
- Elk/Beaver Lake Regional Park (Saanich)
- Island View Beach (Central Saanich)
- Kanaka Creek Regional Park (Maple Ridge)
- Mill Creek Regional Park (Central Okanagan)
- Minnekhada Regional Park (Port Coquitlam)
- Mission Creek Greenway (Central Okanagan)
- Mount Benson Regional Park (Nanaimo)
- Nanaimo River Regional Park (Nanaimo)
- Pacific Spirit Regional Park (UEL/Vancouver)
- Sooke Potholes Regional Park (Sooke)
- Surrey Bend Regional Park (Surrey)

== See also ==
- Urban parks in Canada
