= Flight 102 =

Flight 102 may refer to:

Listed chronologically

- Queen Charlotte Airlines Flight 102, crashed on 17 October 1951
- Interflug Flight 102, crashed on 17 June 1989
- American Airlines Flight 102, crashed on 14 April 1993
- National Airlines Flight 102, crashed on 29 April 2013
- Fly-SAX Flight 102, crashed on 5 June 2018
- IndiaOne Air Flight 102, crashed on 10 January 2026

== See also ==
- STS-102, a successful Space Shuttle mission in March 2001
