= Finding Dawn =

- Directed by: Christine Welsh
- Production company: National Film Board of Canada
- Distributed by: National Film Board of Canada; Women Make Movies
- Release date: 2006
- Running time: 73 minutes
- Country: Canada
- Language: English

Finding Dawn is a 2006 documentary film by Métis filmmaker Christine Welsh looking into the fate of an estimated 500 Canadian Aboriginal women who have been murdered or have gone missing over the past 30 years.

== Subject ==
The film begins with the story of Dawn Crey: one of 60 women, a third of them Aboriginal, who have disappeared from Vancouver's Downtown Eastside over a 20-year period. Crey's remains were among those found on the property of British Columbia serial killer Robert Pickton. However, not enough of Dawn's DNA was found to list her as one of the murder victims at the trial. The film introduces viewers to Dawn's sister and brother, and their involvement in the annual Women's Memorial March in Vancouver.

The film then focuses on BC's Highway 16, known as the Highway of Tears, which runs between Prince Rupert, British Columbia and Prince George, British Columbia, looking at the fate of Ramona Wilson. Wilson was one of nine women – all but one of them Native – who have gone missing or been murdered on that stretch of road since the 1990s.

Welsh also filmed in Saskatoon, where a woman named Daleen Kay Bosse disappeared in 2004. She went missing in May but a criminal investigation didn't begin until the following January. In the film, Daleen's parents and friends talk about their difficulty in getting Saskatoon police to take Daleen's disappearance seriously.

Native rights activists Janice Acoose and Fay Blaney are interviewed in the film.

Christine Welsh has produced, written and directed films for more than 30 years. She is an associate professor at the University of Victoria, where she teaches courses in indigenous women's studies and indigenous cinema.

== Impact ==
Finding Dawn is referenced in the later 2015 documentary Highway of Tears, which notes its impact on native viewers.

== See also ==
- Wendy Poole Park
