= Women's Memorial March =

Annual event held across Canada and the United States

- Also called: WMM
- Date: February 14
- Next time: 14 February 2027
- Frequency: Annual
- First time: 14 February 1992; 34 years ago
- Related to: Missing and murdered Indigenous women and girls

The Women's Memorial March is an annual event held every February 14th to honor missing and murdered Indigenous women and girls (MMIWG) across Canada and the United States. The event also serves as a protest against class disparity, racism, inequality, and violence.

Originating in 1992 in the Downtown Eastside of Vancouver, Canada following the murder of Cheryl Ann Joe, a local Indigenous woman, the event began as a small memorial and has since grown into an annual march recognizing all MMIWG. In the Downtown East Side, the March commences at the intersection of Main and Hastings and proceeds through downtown, pausing at bars, strip clubs, alleys, and parking lots where women's bodies have been discovered. The name of each woman is read aloud along with the name(s) of direct family members (e.g., "daughter of..." or "mother of...") before the family and supporters pause to grieve.

== Significance ==
Participants in the Women's Memorial March consider it a representation of survival and resilience, symbolizing the reclamation of dignity denied to many marginalized women in Canada. The movement also plays an important role in restoring public discourse in the media, challenging stereotypes and misrepresentations of Indigenous women in Vancouver's Downtown Eastside that have historically excused ignorance and discrimination by the police and public.

Dara Culhane, Professor Emeritus of Anthropology at Simon Fraser University, emphasizes a quote from a flyer distributed at the Women's Memorial March in 2001 at the beginning of her essay Their Spirits Live Within Us: Aboriginal Women in Downtown Eastside Vancouver Emerging into Visibility,

"WE ARE ABORIGINAL WOMEN. GIVERS OF LIFE. WE ARE MOTHERS, SISTERS, DAUGHTERS, AUNTIES AND GRANDMOTHERS. NOT JUST PROSTITUTES AND DRUG ADDICTS. NOT WELFARE CHEATS. WE STAND ON OUR MOTHER EARTH AND WE DEMAND RESPECT. WE ARE NOT THERE TO BE BEATEN, ABUSED, MURDERED, IGNORED."

== History ==
On January 20, 1992, Cheryl Ann Joe, a 26-year-old Indigenous woman, was found murdered on Powell Street in Downtown Eastside (DTES).

Weeks later, on February 14, her mother, Linda Ann Joe, and family, along with others living in the area, gathered in the parking lot where Cheryl's body was found to grieve. Linda Joe and other women from the community decided to host an annual grassroots event to show compassion and recognize all women in the DTES, as well as to honor the missing and murdered women.

Each year, Vancouver organizers publish a list of names of women and girls who have been murdered or remain missing in the Downtown Eastside. Since the first march in 1992, over 970 names have been added to this list, including 75 new names from 2019 alone.

The Women's Memorial March now draws thousands of people in Vancouver annually and has expanded as a movement to other provinces in Canada. Many cities across Canada now stage similar events to honour and bring visibility to missing and murdered Indigenous women in their communities.

Marches have expanded to other British Columbian cities, including Victoria, Nanaimo, Courtenay, Nelson, Kelowna, Merritt, Penticton, Grand Forks, and Prince George), as well as:

- Edmonton and Calgary in Alberta;
- Saskatoon;
- Winnipeg, Manitoba;
- Toronto, Ottawa, Kenora, Sault Ste. Marie, Thunder Bay, Six Nations of the Grand River, Mississaugas of the Credit First Nation, and London in Ontario;
- Montreal, Quebec;
- St. John's, Newfoundland; and
- Denver, Colorado, Fargo, North Dakota, and Minneapolis, Minnesota in the United States.

== Cheryl Ann Joe ==
Cheryl Ann Joe (1965 or 1966 – January 20, 1992) was a member of the Shíshálh Nation on the British Columbia’s Sunshine Coast and a single mother of three young boys.

She had lived on the Sunshine Coast before facing challenges with housing, finances, and alcohol, which led her to sex work in the Downtown Eastside. She was trying to earn money to visit two of her children in Alberta who were living with their father.

Joe had planned to become a police officer to help protect the city's vulnerable and would frequently encourage younger women in the sex trade to leave the street and improve their lives.

On January 20, 1992, at the age of 26, Joe's body was found murdered near a warehouse loading dock on Powell Street in the Downtown Eastside. Within hours of discovering her body, detectives had a 36-year-old suspect, Brian Allender, in custody and charged him with first-degree murder. According to police reports, Allender assaulted Joe for up to two hours before she died.

In 1993, a jury convicted Allender of first-degree murder, and he was sentenced to life in prison. Allender is currently serving his sentence in Mountain Institution in Agassiz, BC.

== Violence against Indigenous women in Canada ==
By 2009, close to 67,000 Indigenous women aged 15 and above reported being subjected to violence within the previous 12 months. Approximately 63% of these women were aged 15 to 34 years old. Seventy-six percent of the reported incidents were non-spousal violence and were not reported to police, which is often the case with incidents of violence against Indigenous women. Although many of these crimes against Indigenous women were not reported to police or other service organizations, such as shelters, 98% of victimized women told an informal source such as a friend or family member.

=== Police response ===
In Canada, Indigenous women constitute 4% of the female population and 16% of female murders.

In 2014, the RCMP reported that over 1,200 Indigenous women were missing or had been found murdered in the last 25 years, while Indigenous women's groups self-reported this number to be over 4,000. This discrepancy is due to a lack of evidence and attention from authorities.

Between 1983 and 2003, over 61 women were filed as "missing persons" from Vancouver's Downtown Eastside, and over half were Indigenous women. As families and friends tried to draw attention to the matter, Philip Owen, the mayor of Vancouver from 1993 to 2002, refused to offer a reward or further investigate the missing women, stating that he believed public funds should not be used to create a "location service for prostitutes".

Culhane states that authorities used categorizations of Indigenous women related to sex, drugs, crime, violence, murder, and disease as excuses to ignore and take little action in investigating the root of these disappearances. The justification was that these women inflicted harm on themselves by living in the Downtown Eastside and living the lifestyles that they did. Vancouver's missing women became a public issue as more women disappeared, and academics, advocates, journalists, and the women's families came together. It became publicly recognized that a serial killer might be active in this neighborhood in 1999.

=== Public discourse and the media ===
In the immediate post-war years, violence experienced by Indigenous women in Canada was kept out of mainstream public discourse. It was not until the 1960s that these incidents were given attention in the media. News stories rationalized the violence by focusing on poverty, disease, crime, and sex work in the Downtown Eastside. The photos of the victims used in the media were often mug shots from previous arrests, presenting these women as criminals. In her article, "Indigenous Women as Newspaper Representations: Violence and Action in 1960s Vancouver", Meghan Longstaffe says that media outlets used racist and stereotypical language which reinforced negative representations of Indigenous women.

In her thesis, "You Will Be Punished: Media Depictions of Missing and Murdered Indigenous Women", Caitlin Elliot observes a pattern where reporters used sensationalized and made a spectacle of the injustices occurring, with undue focus on crime while avoiding topics of sex and race prejudice and colonialism.

The use of tropes and stereotypes has been a tactic of settler colonialism since before the 19th century. Negative tropes regarding Indigenous femininity, sexuality, and motherhood pit Indigenous and white women against each other and protect white men from punishment and accountability for abuse against Indigenous women. The "Skid Road Girl" was a trope that appeared in the media as the experiences of Indigenous women faced in Vancouver's Downtown Eastside became more publicly recognized. Due to the surplus of single men, drug use, and crime in the area, "skid road" became a commonly used symbol of the Downtown Eastside. The "Skid Road Girl" referred to women living in this neighborhood and came with negative connotations referring to poverty, addiction, violence, and corruption. According to Elliot, these categorizations informed the idea that violence was a natural consequence of living in this area, and victims were at fault for their own suffering.

According to Longstaffe, Vancouver journalists "combined postwar discourses about "skid road" with stereotypes about Indigenous women to create a specifically female version of this narrative." Headlines such as "Skid Road 'Killed My Girls'" and "Where Were You Going, Little One? Bubble of City Glamor Burst in Bundle of Death" characterized victims as young and helpless. Vancouver Sun Journalist Simma Holt used statements such as, "[She] was drunk, just another cut and bruised Indian girl, and nobody took much interest in the complaint" and "The way she died is typical and so common, society has accepted it just as it does minor traffic accidents." In an attempt to bring awareness to the inaction of the police, the language used in these reports normalized the violence Indigenous women were experiencing and allowed the public to turn a blind eye to the matter. In Dara Culhane's words,

The annual Valentine's Day Women's Memorial March gives political expression to a complex process through which Aboriginal women here are struggling to change the language, metaphors, and images through which they come to be (re)known as they emerge into public visibility.

=== Case studies ===
Some specific cases which illustrate the depth of the problem of violence against aboriginal women in Canada were highlighted in a report by Amnesty International in 2004. They include the murder of 19-year-old Helen Betty Osborne, who was killed November 12, 1971, after a night out with friends in The Pas, Manitoba, a town of 6,000 which was segregated between Indigenous and non-Indigenous Canadians. She was accosted by four non-Indigenous men at 2 a.m. while walking back to her house. Osborne refused to have sex with the men and was then forced into their car, where she was beaten and sexually assaulted. She was then taken to a local cabin, beaten some more, and stabbed to death.

The police assigned to the case failed to act on specific tips that pointed to the four likely perpetrators. The car used during the crime was not searched until a year later (1972). By 1972, police concluded that they did not have enough evidence for the case. Only 20 years later did an inquiry by Manitoba Justice conclude that the murder was fueled by racism and sexism. Charges were eventually brought in October 1986 when new evidence was released. Dwayne Johnson was found guilty in 1987 and sentenced to life in prison. Among the other men, one was acquitted, and the others were never charged.

An example of the perceived indifference to the disappearance of Indigenous women is seen in the case of Shirley Lonethunder, a Cree woman from the White Bear First Nations reserve in Saskatchewan who was last seen by family in December 1991. At the time, she was a 25-year-old mother of two. She was a drug user and occasionally worked in the sex trade, according to family members. The family became aware that she was missing in March 1992 when Lonethunder's attorney contacted them to say she had missed a court date. According to Lonethunder's relatives, Saskatoon police investigators showed little interest in the case. Six months after filing a missing person report for his sister, Lonethunder's brother contacted the police to ask about progress on the case, only to be told they had no record of the report.

==== Robert Pickton case ====
In 1978, the RCMP and the Vancouver Police Department Missing Women Task Force joined forces to organize a list of missing women from the Downtown East Side. By 2002, this list accounted for at least 65 women. In 1992, when the first Women's Memorial March took place and families were demanding thorough investigations into their missing loved ones, the Vancouver police refused to concede that there might be a serial killer preying on the Downtown East Side despite the frequent disappearances, mostly because no bodies had been found.

In March 1997, a woman escaped Robert Pickton's farm and was taken to Royal Columbian Hospital in New Westminster. Pickton was a part owner of his family's pig farm in Port Coquitlam, British Columbia. Pickton ended up in the same hospital for injuries the women inflicted in self defence and the key for the handcuffs around the woman's wrists was found in Picktons pocket. He was charged with attempted murder, assault with a weapon, and forcible confinement, all of which were eventually dropped. The woman, whom Pickton claimed to be a hitchhiker that assaulted him, was shown to be an incompetent witness because of a drug addiction.

Many workers and friends of Pickton's made reports to the police of suspicious behaviour, sightings of women's belongings on the farm, and even a woman's body spotted in the slaughterhouse. None of these reports came from a first hand witness thereby disabling the police from obtaining a search warrant. Finally, in February 2002, Pickton was arrested for a weapons charge allowing the police to conduct a search warrant on his farm. This search revealed human remains and other evidence connecting him to 26 of the missing women from the Downtown Eastside.

In February 2002, Pickton was charged with the murders of 26 of the women listed by the Missing Women Task Force. Pickton often came to the Downtown East Side to dispose of waste and used the opportunity to offer women money or drugs to lure them into his car and take them to his farm. In a conversation with an undercover RCMP officer in his cell, he admitted to murdering 49 women and wanting to make it an even 50. Due to a lack of evidence and attention, however, many of the disappearances were not officially connected to Pickton. Many of the women went missing unnoticed. Sherry Rail, who disappeared in 1984, was not reported missing until 1987 when a team was initiated by the RCMP to investigate unsolved cases of sex trade workers. This team made little progress and was dissolved in 1989.

The provincial government initiated an inquiry into the case in 2012 which concluded that this "tragedy of epic proportions" was caused by "blatant failures" of the police. Failures surrounding incompetent criminal investigative work constituted by prejudice against sex trade workers and Indigenous women. The Pickton case brought public awareness to the ongoing issue of missing and murdered Indigenous women and girls in Canada, as many of his victims were Indigenous women. A national government inquiry was initiated in 2016.

== History in the Downtown Eastside ==
According to the 2021 census (released in 2022), Vancouver is home to 63,345 Indigenous peoples, making the city the third highest population of urban Indigenous people in Canada. Vancouver's Downtown Eastside has been reported to have a disproportionately high population of Indigenous people. As of 2013, the Indigenous population made up 2% of Vancouver as a whole and 10% of the Downtown Eastside.

Downtown Eastside is one of Vancouver's oldest neighbourhoods, and one of Canada's poorest. It has been marked with high levels of addiction, sex work, homelessness, among other social issues that put its residents at risk of violence.

Despite the large numbers of missing and murdered women from this neighbourhood, Meghan Longstaffe says, "The historical processes that shaped this neighbourhood's social location and the experiences of the women and girls who lived there, however, remain poorly understood."

Vancouver's Eastside has historically been a destination for immigrant, working-class families and migrant workers. In the 20th century, this area was largely populated by loggers, miners, fishers, railway workers and other single male labourers who resided in cheap hotels and boarding rooms. Due to categorizations of this area as working class, and dominantly masculine, the Downtown Eastside was deemed, as Longstaffe writes, a zone of "immorality and physical decay."

In the 1950s, a rapid increase of Indigenous migrants began to join the Coast Salish peoples of British Columbia from across North America. This pivotal migration was due to various circumstances in northern and reserve communities concerning economic and social inequity and dislocation. Longstaffe says,

"Multiple factors, including the impacts of residential schools, colonial land and resource policies, technological developments, changes to subsistence and capitalist economies, and growing populations contributed to overcrowding, housing shortages, unemployment, poverty, welfare dependency, alcohol addiction, and poor health."

As a result, many Indigenous men and women moved from reserve communities into city centres. The city provided better social and health services in cases of refuge from violence, employment opportunities and in some cases government-sponsored relocation programs.

These conditions were compounded by the provisions of colonial legislation. According to the Indian Act, for example, Indigenous women who married men who did not have legal Indian status were refused their own status, along with that of their "illegitimate" children's. Before 1985 when the Indian Act was amended, thousands of women without legal status lost their band membership and their right to live on reserves, and were forced to move to city centres.

== See also ==
- Finding Dawn
- Highway of Tears murders
- Wendy Poole Park
