= Christine Welsh =

Canadian Metis filmmaker

Christine Welsh is a Métis Canadian filmmaker, feminist and retired associate professor at the University of Victoria.

== Early life ==
Welsh was born and raised in Regina, Saskatchewan. She is the great-grand-daughter of Norbert Welsh, the famous Metis buffalo hunter.

== Education ==
Welsh graduated from University of Regina, with a B.A. in 1986.

== Career ==
Welsh has produced, written and directed films for more than 30 years.

In 1977, Welsh's career began as an assistant editor on Allen Kings Who Has Seen the Wind film. Welsh moved to Vancouver Island after working as a film editor in Toronto for ten years. Welsh's 2006 National Film Board of Canada documentary Finding Dawn, about murdered and missing Canadian Aboriginal women, won a Gold Audience Award at the 2006 Amnesty International Film Festival. Other film credits include: Women in the Shadows (directed by Norma Bailey, 1992), Keepers of the Fire (1994), Kuper Island: Return to the Healing Circle (with Peter C. Campbell, 1997), and The Story of the Coast Salish Knitters (2000).

Welsh worked as an associate professor at the University of Victoria where she taught courses in indigenous women's studies and indigenous cinema, retiring in 2017. Welsh was the first indigenous faculty member in Humanities at the university. In 2016, the University of Victoria made a scholarship in honor of Welsh, Scholarship for Indigenous Gender Studies Students. She is a resident of Saltspring Island.

== Filmography ==
- Lii Michif Niiyanaan: We Are Métis, (2023) Christine Welsh (Producer), Gregory Coyes (Producer, Director), Madeline Ell (Director), Jeannine Carrière (Executive Producer). Produced in association with the University of Victoria. Produced with assistance from the Government of Canada and Department of Canadian Heritage
- The Thinking Garden, (2017) Christine Welsh (Director, Co-Writer, Co-Producer), Elizabeth Vibert (Researcher, Co-Writer, Co-Producer), Moira Simpson (Cinematographer and editor), Basani Ngobenim(Assistant Director). [Documentary]. Canada, South Africa.
- Finding Dawn, (2006) Ericksen, Svend-Erik (Producer). [Documentary]. Canada. The National Film Board of Canada.
- The Story of the Coast Salish Knitters, (2000) Darling Kovanik, G. & Welsh, C. (Producers). [Documentary]. Canada. Prairie Girl Films and the National Film Board of Canada.
- Kuper Island: Return to the Healing Circle, (1997) Campbell, Peter C & Welsh, C (Producers). Campbell, Peter C & Welsh, C (Directors). [Documentary]. Canada. Gumboot Productions.
- Keepers of the Fire, (1994) Herring, I., Johansson, S., Macdonald, J. & Welsh, C. (Producers). [Documentary]. Canada. Omni Film Productions and the National Film Board of Canada.
- Women in the Shadows, (1991) Johansson, S. & Welsh, C. (Producers). Bailey, N. (Director). [Documentary]. Canada. Direction Films and the National Film Board of Canada.

== Awards ==
- 2006, Winner, Amnesty International Film Festival, Gold Audience Award.
- 2017, Vancouver International Women in Film Festival, Matrix Award in achievement in BC shorts for the film The Thinking Garden.
- 2009, Women in Film and Television Vancouver, Artistic Achievement Award for filmmaking excellence in telling women’s stories.
