= Janice Acoose =

Canadian author

- Born: 1954; Broadview, Saskatchewan
- Died: December 2, 2020 (aged 65–66)
- Occupations: Author, newspaper columnist, filmmaker, indigenous language advocate, professor of indigenous and English
- Employer: First Nations University of Canada
- Parent: Fred Acoose Harriet Acoose nee Beaudin

Janice Acoose (1954–2020) was a Canadian author, newspaper columnist, filmmaker, Indigenous language advocate, activist educator, a professor of Indigenous and English literature at First Nations University of Canada in Saskatchewan and a Sessional Lecturer with the Northern Teacher Education program.

== Early life and family ==
Acoose was born in Broadview, Saskatchewan, and attended the Cowessess Indian Residential School in the 1960s. Her cultural roots stemmed from the Zagime Anishinabek (Saulteaux) First Nation and the Ninankawe Marival Metis.

Her father's mother was Madelaine O'Soup, adopted daughter of O'Soup, Chief of the Anishnabe at O'Soup Reserve. Her father's father was Paul Acoose, from the nearby Sakimay Reserve. Paul was the son of Samuel Acoose, an esteemed Buffalo Runner, and Samuel was descended from Quewich, who travelled with Waywayseecapo.

== Works ==
Acoose was Saskatchewan's first Native Affairs columnist for the Saskatoon Star-Phoenix. She also regularly contributed to the Regina Leader-Post, the Prince Albert Herald, Aboriginal Voices, New Breed and Windspeaker.

In 1995, Toronto's Women's Press published her book Iskwewak Kah Yaw Ni Wahkomakanak. A copy of her Masters Thesis Iskwewak--Kah' Ki Yaw Ni Wahkomakanak: Neither Indian princesses nor squaw drudges is freely available online.

Acoose was interviewed in the 2006 National Film Board of Canada documentary Finding Dawn, about murdered and missing Aboriginal women in Canada.

== Rôles importants ==
Janice Acoose était engagée afin de défendre et de mettre en avant les cultures des Premières Nations.
