= Queen Charlotte Airlines Flight 102 =

1951 aviation accident in Canada

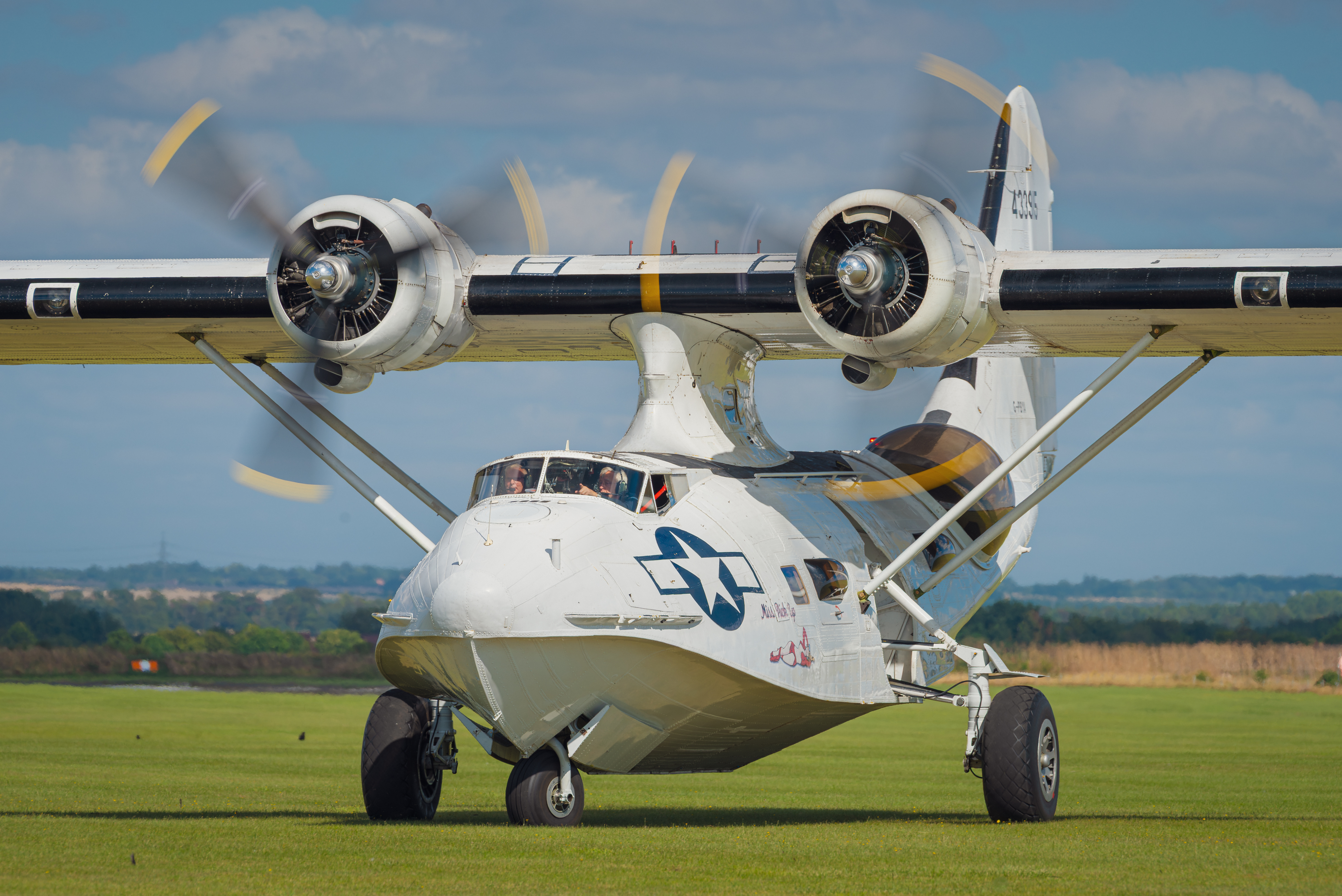
- A Consolidated PBY Catalina, similar to the one involved in the accident

Accident
- Date: October 17, 1951
- Summary: Controlled flight into terrain
- Site: Mount Benson, Nanaimo, British Columbia, Canada; 49°08′59″N 124°03′04″W

Aircraft
- Aircraft type: Consolidated Canso A
- Aircraft name: Polar Bear
- Operator: Queen Charlotte Airlines
- ICAO flight No.: QCA102
- Registration: CF-FOQ
- Flight origin: Kitimat, British Columbia, Canada
- 1st stopover: Kemano, British Columbia, Canada
- Destination: Vancouver, British Columbia, Canada
- Occupants: 23
- Passengers: 20
- Crew: 3
- Fatalities: 23
- Survivors: 0

On October 17, 1951, a Consolidated PBY Catalina operating as Queen Charlotte Airlines Flight 102 crashed into Mount Benson in Nanaimo, British Columbia, Canada, killing all 23 occupants and destroying the aircraft. At the time, the crash was the deadliest in the province.

== Background ==
=== Aircraft ===
The aircraft involved in the crash was CF-FOQ, a Consolidated Canso A manufactured in 1941 and operated by Queen Charlotte Airlines. The aircraft was purchased by the Hudson's Bay Company in 1947 and named Polar Bear. It was sold to Queen Charlotte Airlines in April 1951.

=== Passengers and crew ===
The crew consisted of pilot Douglas Duncan McQueen, First Officer Jiginder Singh Johl and radio operator Ray Williams. McQueen was an experienced pilot, having flown in World War II. Johl received his commercial pilot's license in March 1950 and was hired by Queen Charlotte Airlines that same month. Days later, he was involved in an accident when was forced to land on Johnstone Strait in blizzard condition. All 18 passengers survived.

Seven passengers boarded at Kemano, while thirteen more boarded at Kitimat. The passengers were employees of Alcan.

== Crash ==
The aircraft took off from Kitimat at 3:30 p.m., en route to an unspecified airport in Vancouver. The flight was originally expected to land at 6:10 p.m., but was delayed. Dark, rainy and misty weather caused the pilot to go 60 kilometers west of the flight path in the vicinity of Nanaimo. Witnesses reported seeing it circle twice before veering west, barely clearing the power lines of a transmission station. The pilot reportedly mistook Nanaimo for Vancouver. Ten minutes after the last radio report, the plane flew into the side of Mount Benson exploded, and fell 500 feet to a ledge, setting trees and tree stumps on fire. Broken and seared bodies were scattered up to 152 meters from the point of impact.

A rescue team of 18 men, led by Royal Canadian Mounted Police officers, drove 8 kilometers in back of Nanaimo to the mountain. They divided into four groups and went up different trails, using flashlights for visibility. It took about three hours for the first group to reach the crash site. More than 90 officials and volunteers climbed to the crash site, carrying back the remains on stretchers. In all, twenty bodies were recovered and ten bodies positively identified. Three were missing and presumed to have been incinerated. A field morgue was set up at the base of the mountain.

== Aftermath ==
More than 200 mourners attended the funeral service in Nanaimo. Officiants of the Catholic, Protestant, and Sikh faiths performed funeral rites over twelve caskets. A plaque noted the date and place of the crash, which was the worst in British Columbia at the time. An additional plaque has been mounted by the BC Labour Heritage Centre, BC Building Trades Council and Nanaimo Historical Society. Four books and journals were published about the crash. Hundreds of pieces of wreckage remain on the mountain and are accessible via an unmarked trail.

== Investigation ==
The probable cause of the accident was the continuance of the flight VFR at night under conditions of restricted visibility. Whilst it cannot be determined conclusively, it is probable that through a navigation error the pilot mistook Nanaimo for Vancouver. This may have been precipitated by inadequate pre-flight preparation in that the latest Meteorological Information was not obtained by the pilot before taking off on the south bound flight.

== See also ==
- 1951 in aviation
