= Mount Benson (British Columbia) =

Mountain on Vancouver Island, British Columbia, Canada

- Halkomelem: Tatch-to-lan, Taitookton; Chinook jargon: Wakesiah
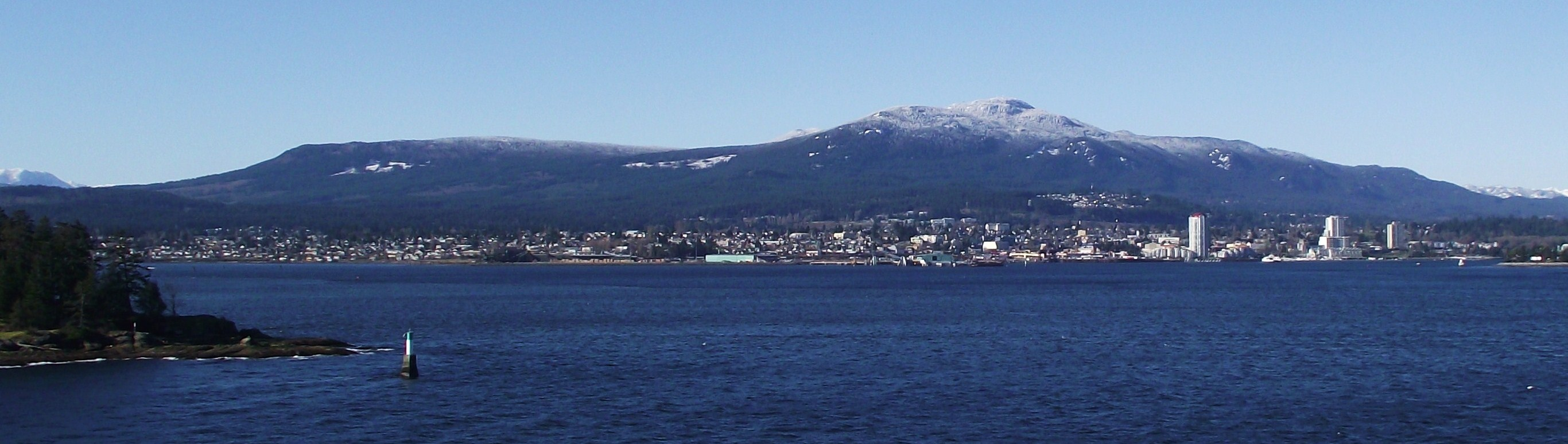
- Mt. Benson viewed from the east at Duke Point

Highest point
- Elevation: 1,023 m (3,356 ft)
- Prominence: 668 m (2,192 ft)
- Coordinates: 49°08′59″N 124°03′04″W

Naming
- Native name: Tatch-to-lan, Taitookton (Halkomelem); Wakesiah (Chinook jargon)

Geography
- Location within British Columbia
- Interactive map of Mount Benson
- Location: Vancouver Island, British Columbia, Canada
- District: Mountain Land District
- Parent range: Vancouver Island Ranges
- Topo map: NTS 92F1 Nanaimo Lakes

Mount Benson (Halkomelem: Tatch-to-lan, Taitookton; Chinook jargon: Wakesiah) is a mountain located on Vancouver Island, British Columbia located 9 km (5.6 mi) west of Nanaimo. At one time, there was road access to the peak as there was a fire lookout at the summit. Today, the road is closed to vehicles but the mountain has become popular with local hikers as it has great views of the Strait of Georgia, the mainland Coast Mountains of British Columbia, the Nanaimo River valley, and the Vancouver Island Ranges, including Mount Arrowsmith.

Mount Benson was named in 1859 by Captain Richards, RN, after his friend Alfred Robson Benson, MD, a physician from Whitby (Yorkshire), who was in the Hudson's Bay Company service 1857–62.

During the last ice age, most of Vancouver Island was covered in a sheet of ice almost 2 kilometres thick, including the area around Mount Benson. Only peaks above that, such as nearby Mount Arrowsmith, poked through the ice sheet. The movement of the ice rounded off lower mountains like Mount Benson giving them the rounded shape they have today. Peaks above the ice sheet remained jagged.

Most of the summit is relatively flat and rounded with several small lakes, surrounded by clearcuts.

== 1951 Kemano air crash ==
On October 17, 1951, 20 passengers and 3 crew members died in which at the time was considered to be the worst aviation accident in British Columbian history when a Canso-A (CF-FOQ) that was operating as Queen Charlotte Airlines Flight 102-17 and was en route from Kitimat to Vancouver crashed into Mount Benson at the 490 m (1,610 ft) level at 6:55 P.M. PDT.

President of the Vancouver chapter of the Canadian Aviation Historical Society Jerry Vernon says the plane took off three hours late at 3 P.M. while it ran into darkness and poor weather conditions. He says the pilot should have landed somewhere along the way earlier before darkness set in.

"The pilot was not qualified to fly instrument after dark and the airplane itself had not been returned to Canada very long, it was not certified (to fly in the dark) either," said Vernon.

Vernon says the events of what led to the plane going down are detailed by author Jim Spilsbury in the book Accidental Airline. Spilsbury owned Queen Charlotte Airlines at the time.

"Apparently he (the pilot) called the tower and said he was 20 miles off of Vancouver, and he was actually more like 40 miles, so he'd been blown off course, it was late and he was in the dark," said Vernon. "He didn't exactly know where he was I guess. They think he was doing a turn to the west to line up with the Vancouver runway and he flew into the mountain because he didn't realize he was over Nanaimo and not over the water."

Vernon says apparently the plane clipped a snag a couple hundred feet away prior to going down. A newspaper report at the time stated that the plane hit a mountainside cliff, burst into flames, then fell 500 feet to a ledge.

In the book Accident Airline, Jim Spilsbury incorrectly claims that another problem with the doomed flight was that the co-pilot was not a trained commercial pilot, but in fact a baggage handler. This is not true; the co-pilot held a valid commercial license as documented in the accident report from the department of transport.

Visible remnants from the wreckage remained on the slopes for many years afterwards, covering about 50 metres on Mt. Benson. As of 2018, hundreds of pieces of wreckage from the plane remain on the mountain, accessible via an unmarked trail.

== Mount Benson Regional Park ==
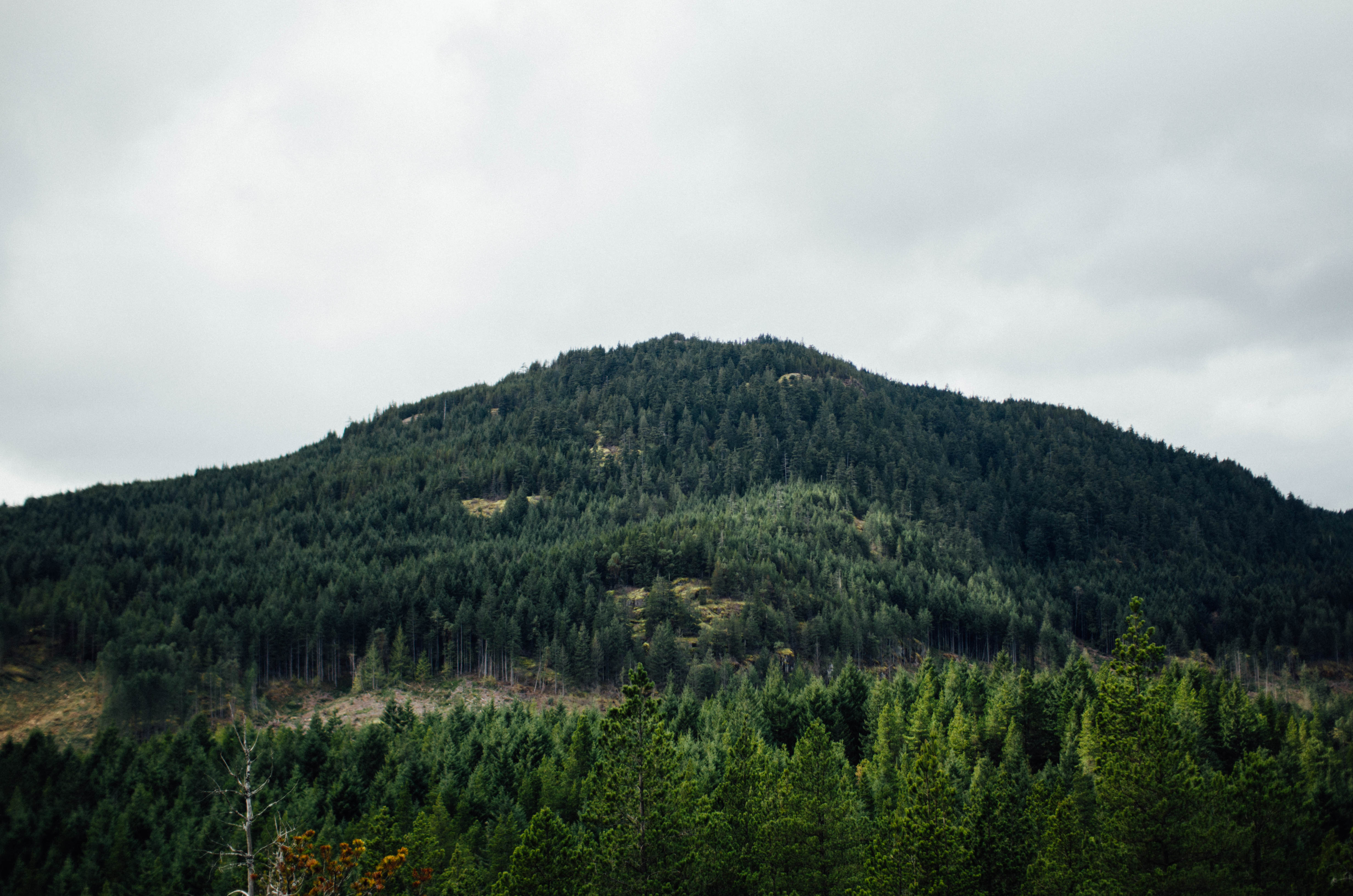
Mount Benson viewed from Roberts Roost trail

Mount Benson Regional Park is a regional park, comprising 212 ha (520 acres) of land on the upper north-east slope of Mount Benson, that was established in July 2008 on land acquired in 2005 by the Regional District of Nanaimo and the Nanaimo and Area Land Trust. There is no road access to the park itself as all of the old access roads to have been blocked off. Access to the park is from a parking lot on Benson View Road by Witchcraft Lake in Nanaimo. Only a portion of the mountain is within the park not including the twin summits.

The park area is the headwaters of the Millstone River and, to the east, the Chase River.

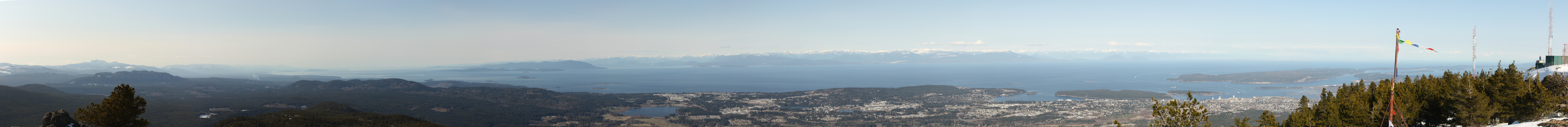
View from Mount Benson showing the Strait of Georgia and the Coast Mountains of mainland British Columbia. Mount Arrowsmith is on the left. Visible islands include Denman, Hornby, Texada, Lasqueti, Sangster, Ballenas, Winchelsea, Thormanby, Merry, Gabriola, Protection, Newcastle, Entrance, Mudge, de Courcy, and Valdes

== See also ==
- List of mountains of British Columbia
