= Queen Charlotte Airlines =

Canadian airline

| IATA | ICAO | Call sign |
|---|---|---|
| - | - | - |
- Commenced operations: 1946
- Ceased operations: 1955
- Fleet size: See Fleet below
- Key people: Jim Spilsbury

Queen Charlotte Airlines was a Canadian airline founded by Jim Spilsbury that operated on the West Coast of Canada from 1946 to 1955, when it was sold to Pacific Western Airlines. Though the airline grew out of a bush flying operation, it became the third largest airline in Canada.

The book The Accidental Airline by Jim Spilsbury and Howard White tells the story of the QCA.

== Fleet ==
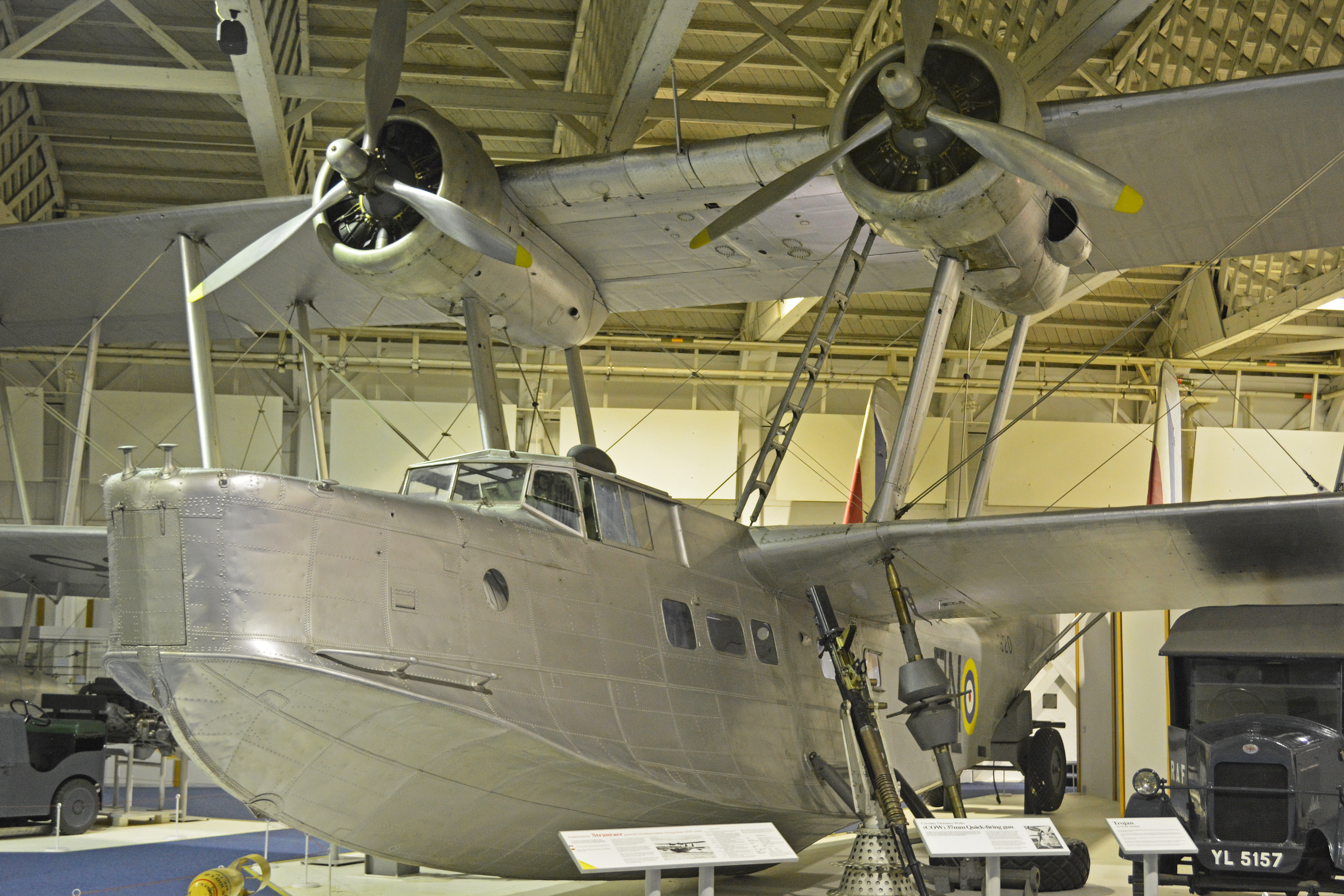
Supermarine Stranraer 920/CF-BXO Royal Air Force Museum London (2015). This aircraft was operated by QCA between 1947 and 1952

The following aircraft were operated by the QCA (this list is possibly incomplete):

- Avro Anson
- Beechcraft Model 17 Staggerwing
- Bellanca Cruisair
- Cessna 180 Skywagon
- Cessna Crane
- Consolidated PBY Catalina
- De Havilland Canada DHC-2 Beaver
- De Havilland Dragon Rapide
- Douglas DC-3
- Fairchild F-11 Husky
- Grumman G-21 Goose
- Noorduyn Norseman
- Stinson 108
- Supermarine Stranraer
- Waco Standard YKC-S

== Accidents and incidents ==
On October 17, 1951, 20 passengers and 3 crew members died in which at the time was considered to be the worst aviation accident in British Columbian history when a Canso-A (CF-FOQ) that was operating as Queen Charlotte Airlines Flight 102-17 and was en route from Kitimat to Vancouver crashed into Mount Benson at the 490 m (1,610 ft) level at 6:55 P.M. PDT.

== See also ==
- List of defunct airlines of Canada
