= Surrey Bend Regional Park =

Park in Surrey, British Columbia

- Interactive map of Surrey Bend Regional Park
- Type: Regional Park
- Location: Surrey, British Columbia
- Nearest city: Surrey, British Columbia, Canada
- Coordinates: 49.204°N 122.744°W
- Operator: Metro Vancouver Regional District
- Website: metrovancouver.org/services/regional-parks/park/surrey-bend-regional-park

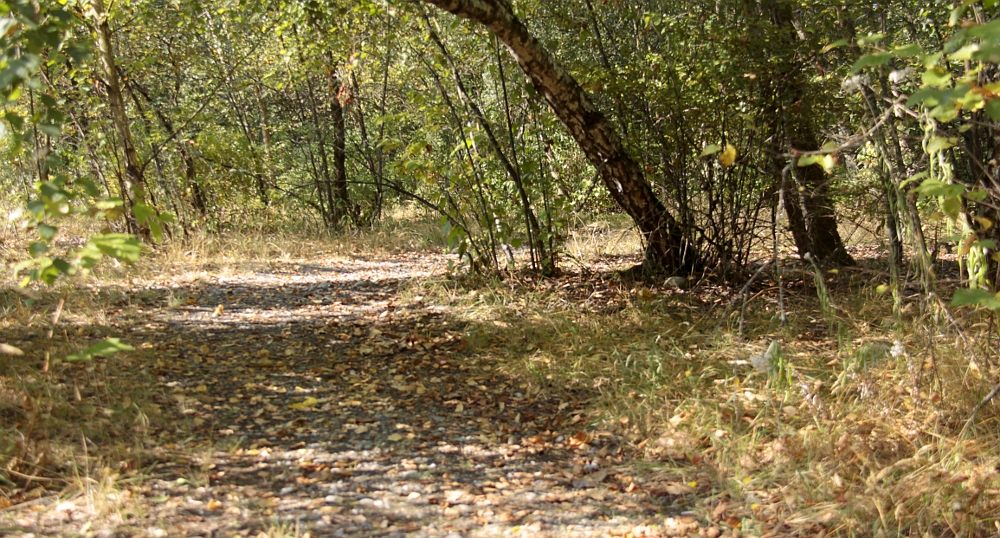
A path in the park

Surrey Bend Regional Park is an 860-acre park in Surrey, British Columbia. It is located along the Fraser River and Parsons Channel, and most of its area is a floodplain. The wetlands are home to many different species of wildlife, including birds and fish. There are 4 kilometres of multi-use trails, picnic areas, and interpretive exhibits.

The park was officially opened in April 2016.
