= Terra Nova Adventure Park =

Playground in Richmond, British Columbia, Canada

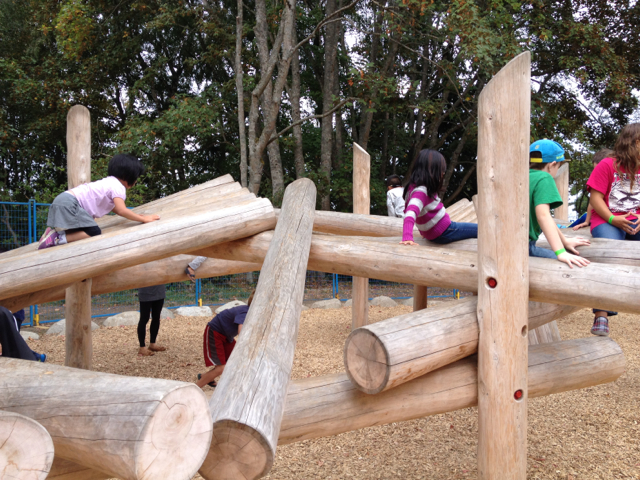

Richmond, British Columbia, Canada
- Coordinates: 49.1736°N 123.1991°W
- Status: Operating

Ride statistics
- Attraction type: Playground
- Designer: Hapa Collective
- Operated by: City of Richmond
- Opening Date: September 27, 2014

Terra Nova Adventure Park is an adventure playground located in the City of Richmond, British Columbia, within the Terra Nova Rural Nature Park. Completed in September 2014 after intensive community planning, the playground's sustainable design works to accomplish an alternative to contemporary playgrounds found throughout the Lower Mainland. Most of the features are made of ropes, yellow cedar wood, and other products that resemble nature, and the Paddock and Homestead areas are inspired from formal farmlands nearby. The park is part of a greater effort by the City of Richmond to increase the number of natural and innovative parks, and have children connect more with nature.

== Location ==
Richmond highlighted on map of the Lower Mainland

Terra Nova Adventure Park is located in the northwest corner of Lulu Island, at the west end of River Road in the Thompson area of Richmond. Built adjacent to the Fraser River and former farm fields, the location of the park plays a key role in promoting outdoor play and appreciation for nature. The Terra Nova landscape includes "intertidal foreshore, dykes, remnant sloughs, and past and present agricultural [and wetland] use" such as the community garden.

This park is most accessible from various parts of Metro Vancouver by driving. Parking is available on site. From Downtown Vancouver, it is approximately a 35 minute drive; this is traffic dependent.

One public transit option to reach Terra Nova Adventure Park is taking the Canada Line to Richmond-Brighouse Station and then getting onto the northbound 401 bus route. This bus stops at the intersection of No. 1 Road and Westminster Highway which is a 25 minute walk from the park.

Biking is another option in order to get to the park. The park can be reached by following the Canada Line Bikeway, turning left onto No. 3 Road and then continuing on Middle Arm Dyke Trail.

== History ==
=== Terra Nova Rural Park ===
Terra Nova means 'New Land' in Latin. The land was first used as a grounds for hunting, fishing, and housing by the Musqueam First Nations people. This area was later claimed by European migrants as the area of Richmond was among the earlier Crown Grant subdivisions. Both groups of people contribute to this rural landscape's agricultural and fishing history.

Prior to the development of the adventure playground, this site remained undeveloped since its original settlement in the late 1800s. The vast amount of unused land provided an opportunity for the implementation of Terra Nova Adventure Park.

=== Funding ===
The approval to spend $2.2 million on the playground, infrastructure, landscape, and nearby facilities for the park was obtained in 2011. The plan for the park was approved in 2012. Terra Nova Adventure Park officially opened on September 27, 2014, although it was slated to open in 2013. This is not the first innovative park in Richmond. In 2008, Richmond opened the playground at Garden City Community Park, a $1-million play environment with distinct areas designed to stimulate creative play.

== Design ==
=== Contributors ===
Hapa Collective, a landscape architecture and urban design group, was selected by the City of Richmond as the Landscape Architect for this project. The project known as the 'Terra Nova Play Experience' was created in collaboration with Lynne Werker and a team of advisors from PWL Partnership ("the Big Kids Group"). The City of Richmond hired PWL Partnership as the lead consultants to execute the preliminary site analysis, to develop the master plan for the park and to oversee its implementation. "The Little Kids Group" included students from local elementary schools of James Gilmore and Spul’u’kwuks who shared their ideas during the design process as well.

LMN23 Interactive Structures Ltd., a Victoria-based firm, was contracted to design and build the playground equipment. This firm is known for developing the equipment for the WildPlay Element Parks in British Columbia, including the treetop course of WildPlay Maple Ridge. As it is designed to "mimic nature", the equipment is mostly of ropes, yellow cedar wood and spiderweb structures, allowing the park to blend in with its natural environment. These play structures express the city's "sustainable design practices" of reducing the use of metal and plastic.

=== Purpose ===
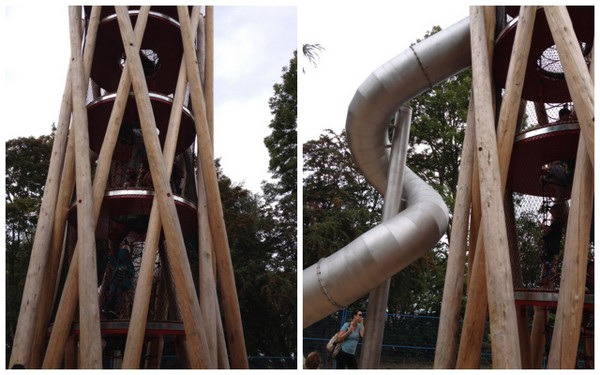
Terra Nova Playground

Hapa Collective describes Terra Nova as a park that "responds to its setting, its constituents, and the ‘imperfect grid’ formal language" of the area. It is a "place for off-leash kids" that encourages imaginative and energetic play, making it suitable for all ages. Toddlers can get dirty in the water and sand areas, get lost in the meadow maze or chase dragonflies and try to spot some frogs. Older children are able to take full advantage of the park.

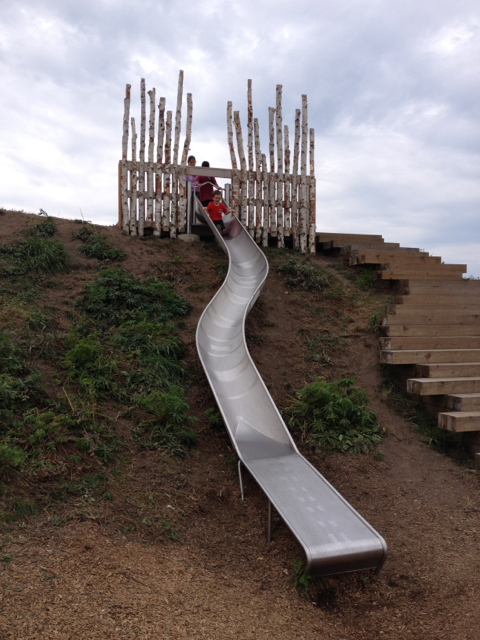
Terra Nova Playground Slide

The park is divided into two distinct areas, the 'Homestead' and the 'Paddock'. The 'Homestead', the former site of the farmhouse, offers areas of shade and features the park's signature "10-metre tall treehouse [of four platforms] with a central rope ladder, a [stainless steel] spiral slide, and the log jam". The log jam is a climbable timber structure, and an ‘aerial’ rope walkway.

The 'Paddock' area was once home to horses and stables. It now features the 35-metre long tandem ziplines, the rolling hill with a built-in slide, three-metre high swings, a pivot swing, and a meadow maze.

== Natural Environment ==
=== Wildlife ===
Birds, such as hawks, eagles, owls and at-risk herons, arrive in the conservation area of the park during the winter months. This park provides an excellent habitat for birds and other wildlife in the area. Boardwalks, slough and viewing platforms are available for enhanced park visibility and access. A section of a nearby dyke has been opened up in order to refill the waterway and allow for fish and other wildlife to survive in this area. The City of Richmond has issued the replanting of native grasses and crabapple trees in order to restore some of the natural plant species of this environment. Note that Dogs are not allowed given the City of Richmond Animal Control Bylaw 8612.

=== Facilities ===
Park facilities include three portable toilets and picnic benches. As explained by Kevin Connery, City of Richmond Park Planner, there are plans for permanent bathrooms to be put in place, however, this is difficult given the park's location as it is quite far from the sewer line. As well, Terra Nova features the "Red Barn" which is used primarily as a gathering place. It features both a new kitchen and washrooms.

=== Community Involvement ===
Various agriculturally oriented activities take place at the park, including a water-wise demonstration garden and a community garden. Terra Nova is also home to user groups such as The Sharing Farm and the Terra Nova School Yard Society. The park is also used for many other activities, such as the Raptor Festival and Raptor Program, the 8th Annual Garlic Festival, the Terra Nova Camping Program, and Terra Nova Schoolyard Program for pre-school to elementary school age students.

== See also ==
- Richmond Nature Park
- Minoru Park
- Richmond, BC
- Richmond Night Market
- Sea Island, BC
- Vancouver, BC
- Steveston, British Columbia
- Lulu Island
- Iona Island (British Columbia)
- Canada Line
- Richmond–Brighouse station
- Transportation in Vancouver
- Vancouver International Airport
- Fraser River
- Musqueam Indian Band
