= Forests for the World =

Coordinates: 53.920516°N 122.743378°W

Forests for the World is a municipal park located in Prince George, British Columbia in the Fraser-Nechako plateau region. It has over 15 kilometres (9.3 mi) of multi-use trails which pass both Small Reflection Lake and Shane Lake. Facilities include fire pits, picnic tables, and a look-out tower. This area has a covered picnic area, and restrooms. The mass of trails connects to a variety of other hiking spots in the area, including the UNBC Greenway, Otway ski trails, and blue spruce trails. The park in full is 106 hectares, and is considered an easy/beginners trail. The forest has a mix of deciduous and coniferous trees, frequent in spruce, douglas fir, and pine.

Many maps and markers exist, scattered throughout the trails, although junctions can be overgrown and it's easy to lose your way. Common animals that frequent the area include beavers, bears, moose, cougars, and ducks. Shane lake, located within the park, contains trout to fish and has two docks to cast from.
