= McAuley Park =

Municipal park in Vancouver, British Columbia, Canada

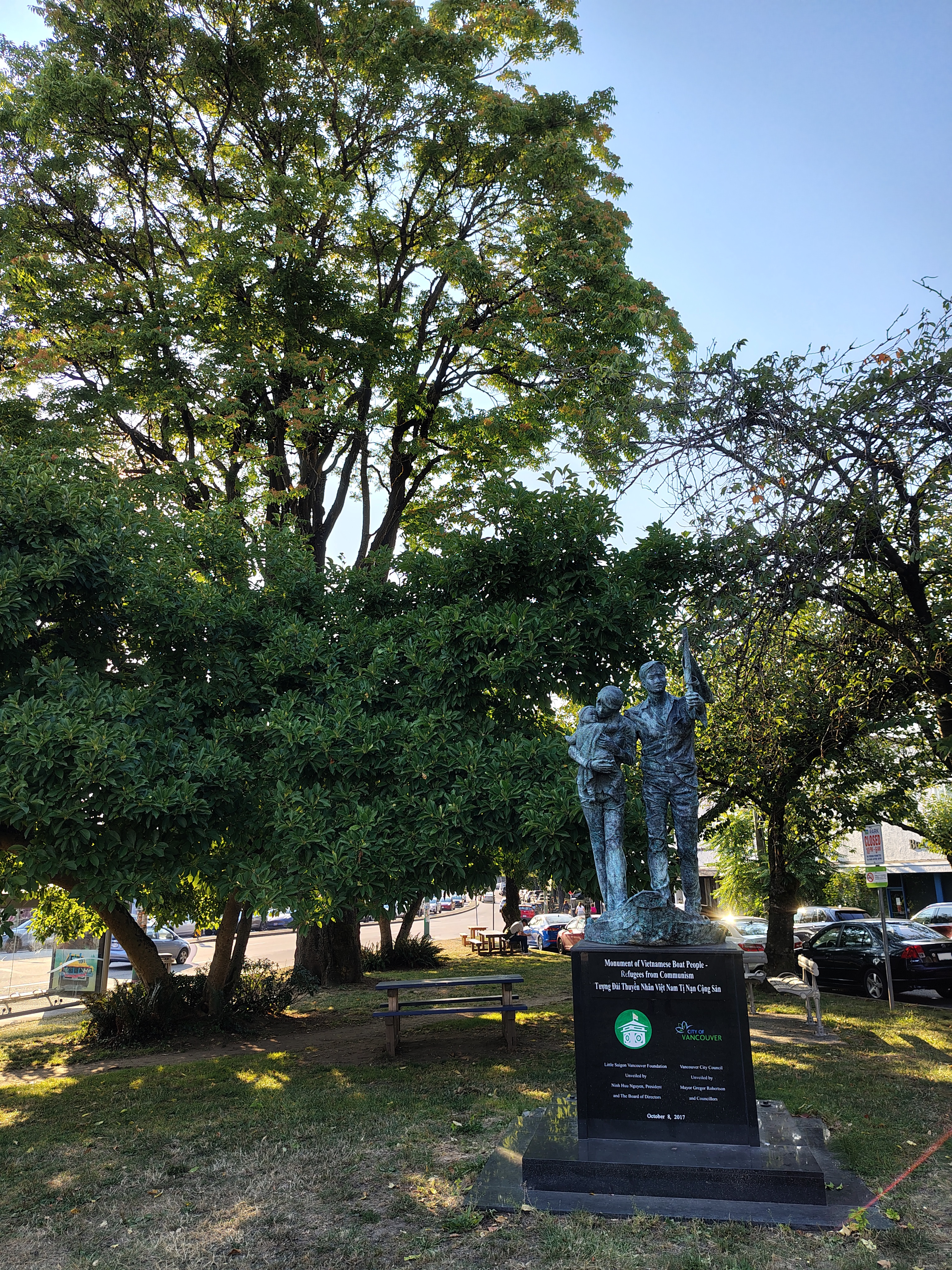
- Interactive map of McAuley Park
- Type: Public Park
- Location: Vancouver, British Columbia, Canada
- Coordinates: 49.25706°N 123.09°W
- Operator: City of Vancouver

McAuley Park is a small public municipal park in Vancouver, British Columbia, Canada, located at the intersection of Kingsway and Fraser Street.

== Name ==
The park is named after Harvey and Theresa McAuley, whose extensive and lengthy volunteer contributions to the community were honoured by the City of Vancouver.

== Events ==
The park has been the venue for several multi-cultural festivals, hosted by the Dickens Community Group. Other events held in the park include a jerk chicken festival and displays by local artists.

== Gallery ==
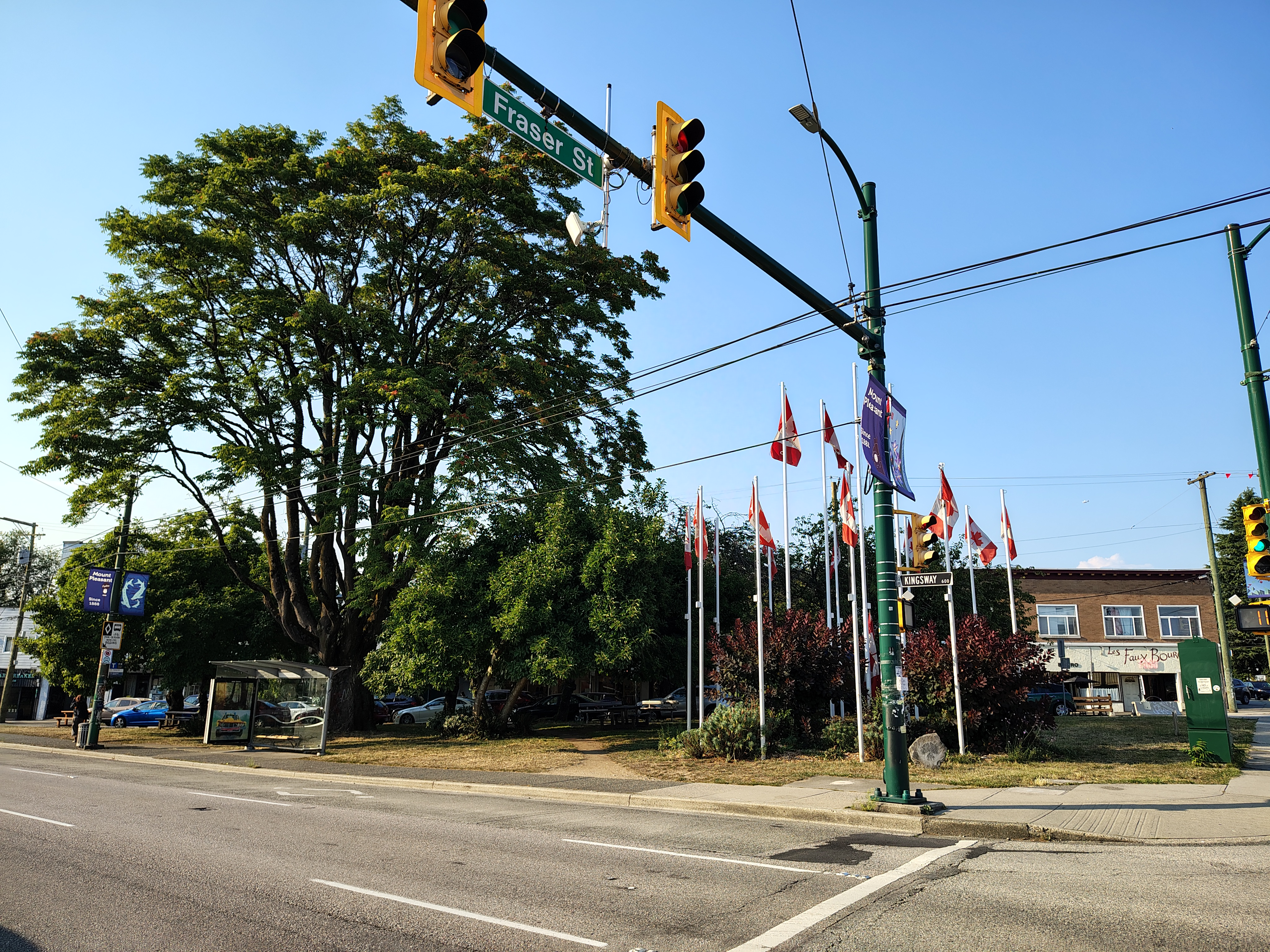
McAuley Park from Fraser & Kingsway

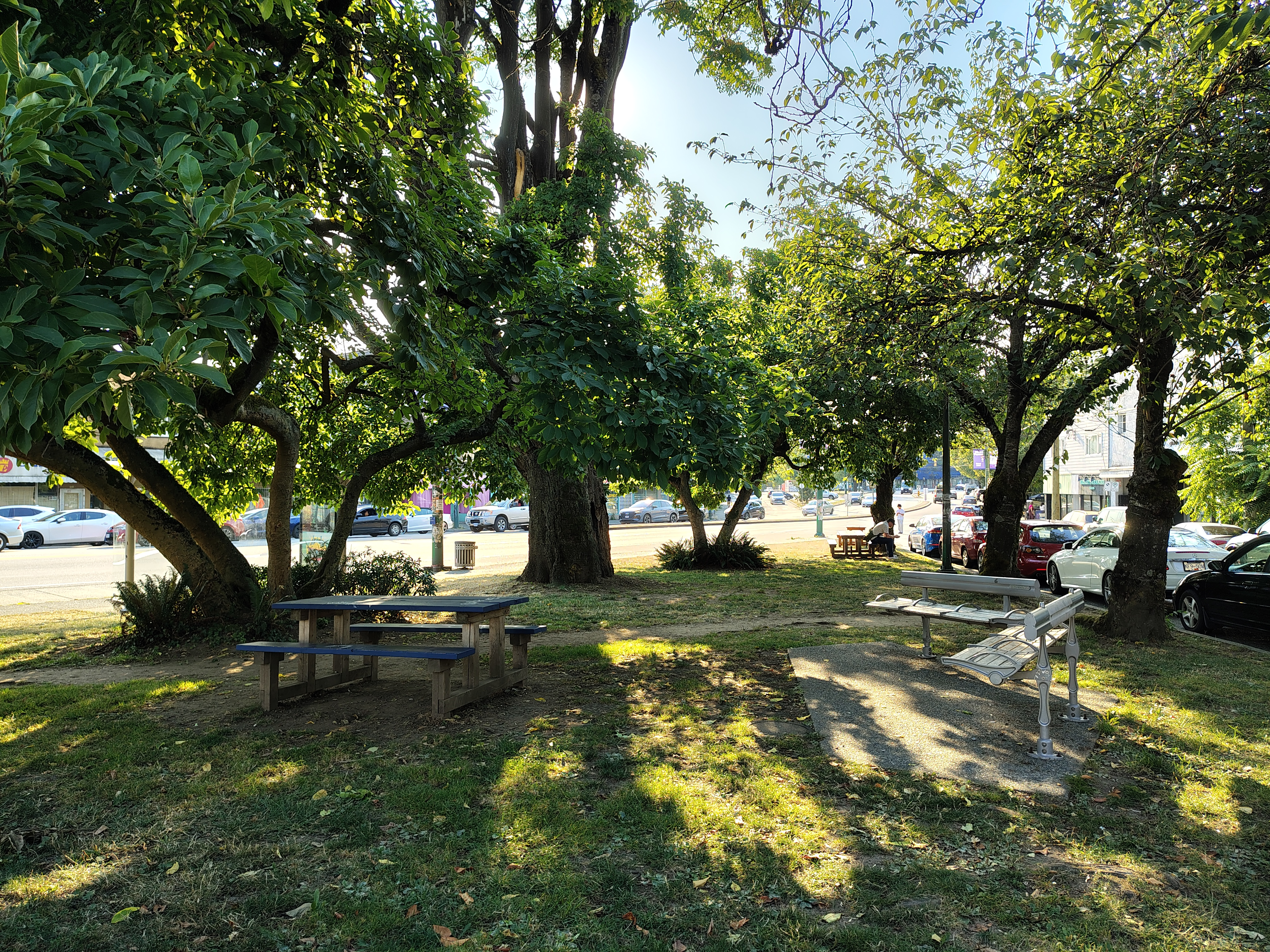
Benches in McAuley Park

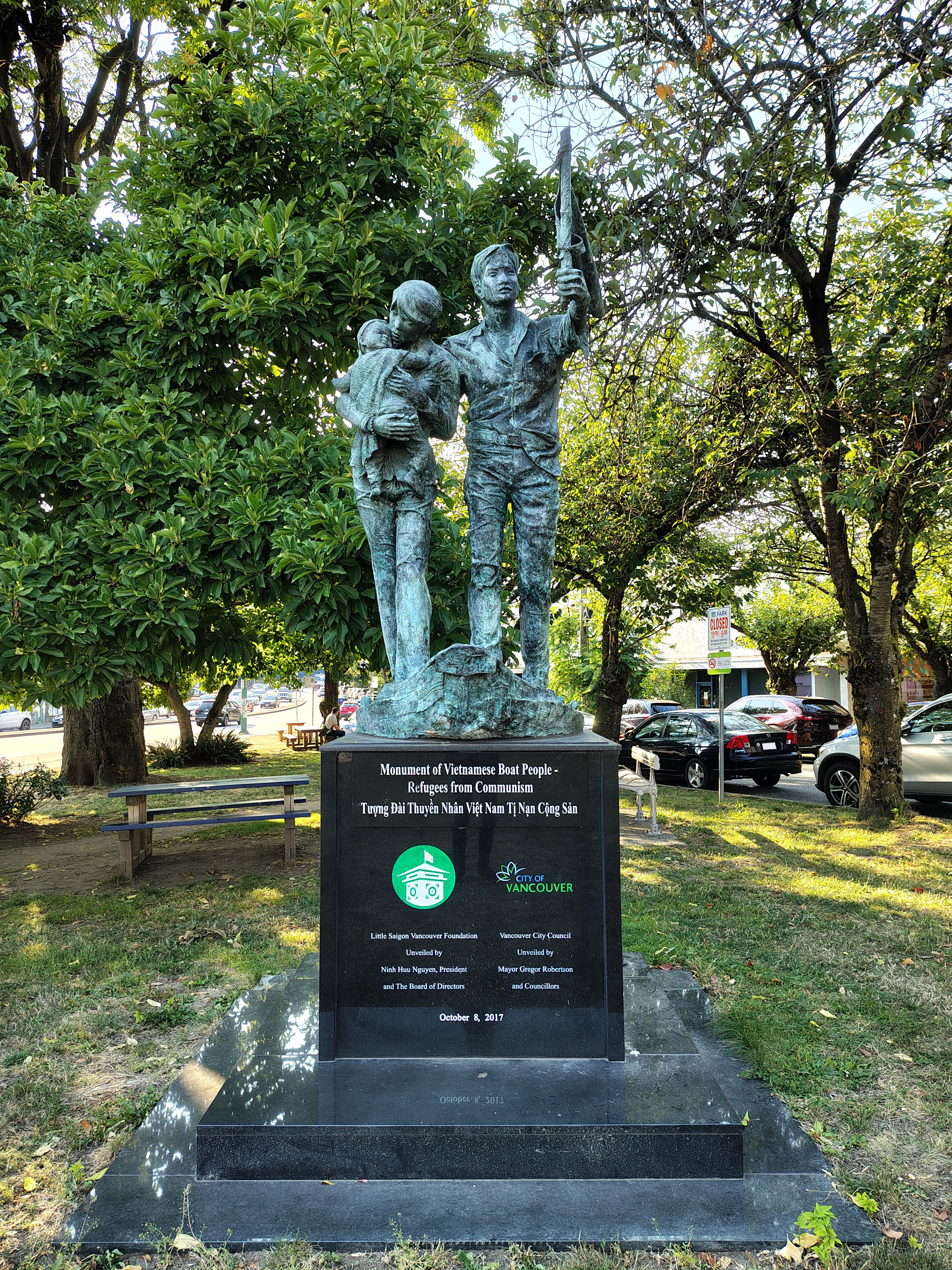
The Monument of Vietnamese Boat People, or the Vietnamese Boat People Memorial, by Vivi Vo Hung Kiet
