= Dora (given name) =

Dora (Greek: Δώρα) is a female name of Greek origin, being a shortened form of, or derived from Dorothea (Dorothy) and Theodora (masculine Theodore), meaning "gift" or in its full form "god's gift", from δῶρον, doron, "gift" + θεός, theos, "god". The name Dora can also be a short form of other names containing -dora such as Eudora and Isadora (Isidora). Dora was used as an English equivalent for the name Doirend or Doireann in Ireland. Doreen, Dorian, and Dorinda are other examples of names from the same root form.

The earliest form of the word doron is the Mycenaean Greek 𐀈𐀨, dora, meaning "gifts", written in the Linear B syllabic script, but it is not an anthroponym, it is only the plural (δῶρα) of said word; on the other hand, the names Theodora and Amphidora are attested in Linear B as 𐀳𐀃𐀈𐀨, te-o-do-ra, and 𐀀𐀠𐀈𐀨, a-pi-do-ra, respectively. The masculine counterpart of the latter, i.e. Amphidoros, is also found: 𐀀𐀠𐀈𐀫, a-pi-do-ro.

In Albanian, dora means "hand". In Russian, Dora can be a diminutive of the male first name Agafodor.

== People ==
=== A ===
- Dora Acuña (1903–1987), Paraguayan poet, journalist and radio personality
- Dora Afi Abotsi (born 1991), Ghanaian weightlifter
- Dora Akunyili (1954–2014), Nigerian pharmacist and government official
- Dora Alcala, American politician
- Dora Alonso (1910–2001), Cuban journalist and writer
- Dora Altbir (born 1961), Chilean physicist
- Dora Altmann (1881–1971), German actress
- Dora Anastasiou (born 1988), Cypriot beauty queen
- Dora E. Angelaki, neuroscientist
- Dóra Antal (born 1993), Hungarian water polo player
- Dora Apel (born 1952), American author and academic

=== B ===
- Dora Sandoe Bachman (1869–1930), American lawyer
- Dora Bakoyannis (born 1954), Greek politician
- Dora Baret (born 1940), Argentine actress
- Dora Barilla, American health care strategist
- Dora Barrancos (born 1940), Argentine academic and politician
- Dora Barton (1880–1966), English actress
- Dora Isabel Baudinet (1883–1945), Australian nurse
- Dora Beedham née Spong (1879–1969), British nurse and suffragette
- Dora de Beer (1891–1982), New Zealand ethnologist and mountain climber
- Dora Beets (1812–1864), Dutch writer
- Dora Benjamin (1901–1946), German psychologist and economist
- Dora Beregi (1915–2011), British table tennis player
- Dora Bianka (c. 1895–1979), Polish-born French painter, illustrator
- Dora Billington (1890–1968), English studio potter
- Dora Biro, behavioral biologist
- Dora Birtles (1903–1992), Australian writer
- Dóra S. Bjarnason (1947–2020), Icelandic academic
- Dóra Bodonyi (born 1993), Hungarian canoeist
- Dora Boneva (1936–2021), Bulgarian painter
- Dora Boothby (1881–1970), English badminton and tennis player
- Dora Bouchoucha, Tunisian film producer
- Dora Boyd de Pérez Balladares (born 1948), Panamanian First Lady
- Dora Bria (1958–2008), Brazilian windsurfer
- Dora Bright (1863–1951), English composer and pianist
- Dora Brilliant (1880–1907), Ukrainian socialist revolutionary
- Dora Bromberger (1881–1942), German painter
- Dora Bryan (1923–2014), British actress
- Dora Budor (born 1985), Croatian artist
- Dora Madison Burge (born 1990), American actress
- Dora Byamukama, Ugandan politician

=== C ===
- Dora Cadavid (1937–2022), Colombian actress
- Dora Carrington (1893–1932), British painter
- Dora Castanheira (born 1960), Brazilian volleyball player
- Dora Chamberlain (1928–2016), Martin Beck Theatre treasurer
- Dora Chapman (1911–1995), Australian artist
- Dora Chatterjee, Indian physician
- Dora Chung Zane (1904–1991), American social worker
- Dora Clarke, British sculptor and wood carver
- Dora Cojocaru (born 1963), Romanian composer
- Dora Colebrook, doctor and bacteriologist
- Dora Colvin, American truck driver
- Dora Corty-Mönkemeyer (1890–1970), German painter
- Dora Cosens (1894–1945), pioneering female architect
- Dora L. Costa, American economist
- Dóra Csabai (born 1989), Hungarian water polo player
- Dora Curtis (1873–1920), American artist
- Dóra Czigány (born 1992), Hungarian water polo player

=== D ===
- Dóra Danics (born 1986), Hungarian singer
- Dóra Dávid (born 1985), Hungarian politician
- Dora de Beer (1891–1982), New Zealand ethnologist and mountain climber
- Dora De Larios (1933–2018), American ceramist and sculptor
- Dora De Winton (1874–?), British actress
- Dóra Deáki (born 1991), Hungarian handball player
- Dora Dean (1872–1949), American vaudeville dancer and entertainer
- Dora Deliyska, Bulgarian concert pianist
- Dora Diamant (1898–1952), Polish teacher and actress, lover of Franz Kafka
- Dora Annie Dickens (1850–1851), infant daughter of English novelist Charles Dickens
- Dora Djilianova (born 1976), Bulgarian tennis player
- Dora Doll (1922–2015), French actress
- Dora Dolz (1941–2008), Spanish Dutch artist
- Dora Draganova (born 1946), Bulgarian composer
- Dora Drake, 21st-century American politician
- Dora Duby (1901–1998), American dancer
- Dora Dueck, Canadian writer
- Dora Dumbuya, Christian evangelist preacher from Sierra Leonean
- Dora Duncker (1855–1916), German writer and theatre critic
- Dóra Dúró (born 1987), Hungarian politician

=== E ===
- Dora Francisca Edu-Buandoh, Ghanaian-English professor
- Dora Emdin (1912–1945), English table tennis player
- Dora Epstein-Jones, historian and architecture
- Dora Erway (1889–1976), American artist and home economist

=== F ===
- Dora Finch (1877–1943), British matron

=== G ===
- Dora Gabe (1886–1983), Bulgarian Jewish poet
- Dora Gaitskell, Baroness Gaitskell (1901–1989), Labour Party politician and life peer
- Dora Gález, Argentine actress and vedette
- Dora Elvira García González, Mexican philosopher
- Dora García (born 1965), Spanish artist
- Dora Gardner (1912–1994), English athlete
- Dora Gerson (1899–1943), German actress
- Dora Gibbs (1910–2008), British swimmer
- Dora Goldstein (1922–2011), pharmacologist and professor
- Dora Gordine (1895–1991), Estonian-British artist
- Dora Gorman (born 1993), Irish footballer
- Dora Greenwell (1821–1882), English poet
- Dora van der Groen (1927–2015), Belgian actress
- Dóra Győrffy (born 1978), Hungarian high jumper

=== H ===
- Dora Jane Hamblin (1920–1993), American journalist
- Dora Hand (c. 1844–1878), American dance hall singer in Dodge City, Kansas
- Dora Heldt (born 1961), German writer
- Dora Henninges Heinsohn (1861–1900), American opera singer
- Dora Hernández (born 1948), Mexican diver
- Dora Heyenn (born 1949), German politician
- Dora Hitz (1856–1924), German painter
- Dora Holzhandler (1928–2015), British painter
- Dora Honnywill (1870–1959), British archer
- Dóra Hornyák (born 1992), Hungarian handball player

=== I ===
- Dora Ilse (1898–1979), German entomologist
- Dora Irizarry (born 1955), Puerto Rican judge
- Dóra Ivanics (born 1994), Hungarian handball player

=== J ===
- Dora Jacobsohn (1908–1983), German-Swedish physiologist and endocrinologist
- Dora Jane Janson (1916–2002), American art historian
- Dora Jar (born 1996), American bedroom pop musician
- Dora Jelínková (1949–2007), Czech volleyball player
- Dora Jemaa-Amirouche (born 1985), French hurdler
- Dora Herbert Jones (1890–1974), Welsh administrator and singer
- Dora Justiniano de la Rocha (1925–2016), Bolivian linguist, educator and poet

=== K ===
- Dora Kaiser (1892–1972), Austrian actress
- Dora Kalaus (born 1996), Croatian handball player
- Dora Kallmus (1881–1963), Austrian photographer
- Dora Kaminsky (1909–1977), American painter
- Dora Keen (1871–1963), American mountain climber
- Dora Wheeler Keith (1856–1940), American painter
- Dóra Keresztes (born 1953), Hungarian artist
- Dora Khayatt (1912–1986), Egyptian-born American painter
- Dora Juárez Kiczkovsky, Mexican singer and filmmaker
- Dóra Kisteleki (born 1983), Hungarian water polo player
- Dora Koch-Stetter (1881–1968), German painter
- Dora Komar (1914–2006), Austrian dancer, actress and soprano
- Dora Kötél (born 1988), Hungarian volleyball player
- Dora Kotzee, South African politician
- Dora Krsnik (born 1992), Croatian handball player
- Dora Krstulović (born 1981), Croatian tennis player
- Dora Kyriakou (born 1967), Cypriot sprinter

=== L ===
- Dora Labbette (1898–1984), British opera singer
- Dóra María Lárusdóttir (born 1985), Icelandic footballer
- Dora Fugh Lee, Chinese-American painter, illustrator, and sculptor
- Dóra Leimeter (born 1996), Hungarian water polo player
- Dora Levy Mossanen (born 1945), American author
- Dora Lewis (1862–1928), American suffragist
- Dora Lindsay, Scottish comedian
- Dóra Lőwy (born 1977), Hungarian handball player
- Dóra Lucz (born 1994), Hungarian canoeist
- Dora Lush (1910–1943), Australian bacteriologist
- Dora Luz (1918–2018), Mexican singer

=== M ===
- Dora Maar (1907–1997), French model and photographer
- Dora Maclean (1892–1978), Australian horse-breeder
- Dóra Madarász (born 1993), Hungarian table tennis player
- Dora Maldonado (born 1970), Honduran judoka
- Dora Malech (born 1981), American poet
- Dora María (1933–2023), Mexican singer
- Dora Marsden (1882–1960), English suffragette and editor
- Dora Martínez Valero (born 1976), Mexican politician
- Dóra Maurer (1937–2026), Hungarian visual artist
- Dora Mayer (1868–1959), German-born activist and essayist on Peruvian topics
- Dora Mazzone (born 1966), Venezuelan actress
- Dora Mbanya (born 1956), Cameroonian professor of Hematology
- Dora McGrath, American politician
- Dóra Medgyessy (born 1986), Hungarian basketball player
- Dora Meeson (1869–1955), Australian artist
- Dora van der Meiden-Coolsma (1918–2001), Dutch writer
- Dora Melegari (1849–1924), Swiss writer
- Dora Metcalf (1892–1982), Anglo-Irish entrepreneur, engineer and mathematician
- Dora Richards Miller, (1842–1914), Danish West Indies-born American author and educator
- Dora Mills Adams (1874–1943), American film actress
- Dora Modestou (born 1988), Cypriot footballer
- Dóra Molnár (born 2006), Hungarian swimmer
- Dora Montefiore (1851–1933), English-Australian women's suffragist, socialist, poet and autobiographer
- Dora Kim Moon (1876–1971), Korean-American activist
- Dora Mavor Moore (1888–1979), Canadian actress
- Dora Emilia Mora de Retana (1939–2001), Costa Rican botanist
- Dora Moroni (born 1956), Italian singer
- Dora Louise Murdoch (1857–1933), American artist
- Dora Musielak, Mexican-American aerospace engineer, historian of mathematics, and book author
- Dora Mwima, Ugandan beauty pageant contestant

=== N ===
- Dora Nascimento (born 1967), Brazilian geographer and politician
- Dora Noyce, Scottish brothel keeper
- Dora Moono Nyambe (1992–2024), Zambian humanitarian and TikToker

=== O ===
- Dora Ohlfsen-Bagge (1869–1948), Australian painter, sculptor, and medallist
- Dóra Ólafsdóttir (1912–2022), Icelandic supercentenarian
- Dora Olivo (born 1943), American politician
- Dora Opoku (1948–2010), Ghanaian educationist

=== P ===
- Dora Panofsky (1885–1965), German-American art historian
- Dóra Papp (born 1991), Hungarian footballer
- Dóra Pásztory (born 1984), Hungarian Paralympic swimmer
- Dora Patzkowski, Cherokee Nation politician
- Dora Pavel (born 1946), Romanian novelist
- Dora de Pedery-Hunt (1913–2008), Hungarian-Canadian medallist
- Dora Pejačević (1885–1923), Croatian composer
- Dora de Phillippe (1877 – post-1931), French opera soprano
- Dora Pinkham (1891–1941), American politician
- Dora Polić (born 1971), Croatian actress
- Dora Postigo (born 2004), Spanish singer
- D. J. Potter (1915–1987), Australian children's author
- Dora Puelma (1898–1972), Chilean artist

=== R ===
- Dora Rangelova (born 1967), Bulgarian tennis player
- Dora Knowlton Ranous (1859–1916), American actress, author
- Dora Ratjen, birth name of Heinrich Ratjen (1918–2008), German high jumper who competed as a woman in the 1936 Olympics, but was later found to be male and/or intersex
- Dora Alicia Recinos Sorto (1976/1977–2009), Salvadoran anti-mining activist
- Dora Richardson (1919–1998), British organic chemist
- Dora Richter (1892–1966), German transgender woman and the first known person to undergo complete male-to-female gender-affirming surgery
- Dora Riedel (1906–1982), Chilean architect
- Dora Rosetti (1908–1989), Greek doctor and writer
- Dora Russell (disambiguation)

=== S ===
- Dora Jessie Saint (1913–2012), English novelist
- Dora Sánchez (1949–2011), Argentine politician
- Dora Sanders Carney, Canadian journalist
- Dora Schönemann, German swimmer
- Dora E. Schoonmaker (1851–1934), American missionary
- Dora Serle (1875–1968), Australian artist
- Dora Adele Shoemaker (1873–1962), American educator, writer
- Dora Shulner (1890–1964), Ukrainian-American writer
- Dora Sigerson Shorter (1866–1918), Irish poet and sculptor
- Dora Marie Sigar (1919–2008), Indonesian nurse, activist and homemaker
- Dora Siliya (born 1970), Zambian politician
- Dora Söderberg (1899–1990), Swedish actress
- Dora Staudinger (1886–1964), German-Swiss religious socialist and publicist
- Dóra Stefánsdóttir (born 1985), Icelandic footballer
- Dora Stock (1759–1832), German artist
- Dora von Stockert-Meynert (1870–1947), Austrian writer, poet and playwright
- Dora Hall Stockman (1872–1948), American politician
- Dora Stratou (1903–1988), Greek dancer and folklorist
- Dora Dougherty Strother (1921–2013), American aviator
- Dóra Süle (born 1998), Hungarian footballer
- Dora M. Sweeney (1907–2001), American secretary and politician
- Dora Sweetapple (1872–1972), Australian nurse
- Dora Szabados (born 2006), Hungarian rhythmic gymnast

=== T ===
- Dora Talamante Lemas (born 1965), Mexican politician
- Dora Tamana (1901–1983), South African anti-apartheid activist
- Dora Taylor, South African woman writer and propagandist
- Dora Tchakounté (born 1995), French weightlifter
- Dora María Téllez (born 1955), Nicaraguan revolutionary
- Dora Thewlis (1890–1976), British suffragette
- Dora E. Thompson (1876–1954), American nurse
- Dora Trigueras (born 1982), Mexican politician
- Dora Tulloch (1878–1945), English stage performer, actor and playwright
- Dora Turner (1888–1953), Australian educator
- Dóra Turóczi (born 1990), Hungarian former competitive ice dancer

=== V ===
- Dora Valesca Becker (1870–1958), American musician
- Dora Varella (born 2001), Brazilian skateboarder
- Dora Vasconcellos (1910–1973), Brazilian writer and diplomat
- Dora Vass (born 1991), Hungarian rhythmic gymnast
- Dora Varona (1932–2018), Cuban-Peruvian poet, narrator, and missionary

=== W ===
- Dora Wahlroos (1870–1947), Finnish painter
- Dora Wasserman (1919–2003), Jewish-Canadian actress, playwright and theater director
- Dora Werzberg (1920–2020), French nurse
- Dora V. Wheelock (1847–1923), American activist and writer
- Dora Wilcox (1873–1953), New Zealand-born Australian poet and playwright
- Dora Wiley (1853–1924), American actress
- Dora Wilson (1883–1946), British-born Australian artist
- Dora Wordsworth (1804–1847), daughter of William Wordsworth

=== Y ===
- Dora Yates (1879–1974), bibliographer and Romani scholar

=== Z ===
- Dora Zaslavsky (1904–1987), American pianist
- Dóra Zeller (born 1995), Hungarian footballer

== Fictional characters ==
- Dora (Dora the Explorer), protagonist of the Dora the Explorer franchise
- Dora the Female Explorer, eponymous subject of a song on the 1971 album Stackridge
- Dora, a character from the second season of Battle for Dream Island, an animated web series
- Dora Bianchi, in the webcomic Questionable Content
- Dora Orefice, in the Life Is Beautiful movie
- Dora Winifred "D.W." Read, in the Arthur book and television series
- Dora Spenlow, in the Dickens novel David Copperfield

== See also ==
- Dora (disambiguation)
- Doreen (given name)
- Doralice, a given name
