= Jazzorca =

Music venue in Mexico City

Cafe Jazzorca Free jazz and experimental music
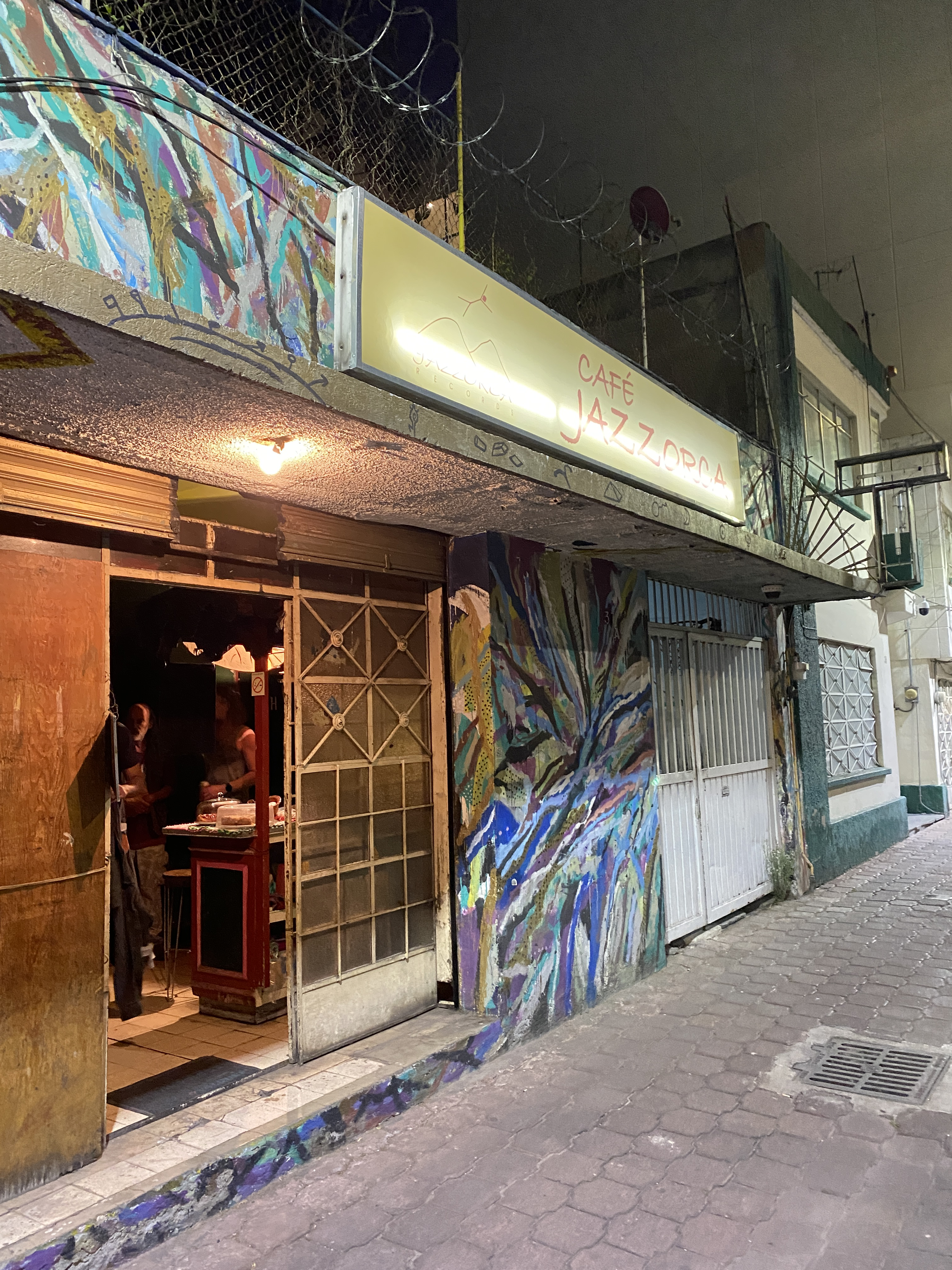
- Interactive map of Cafe Jazzorca; Free jazz and experimental music
- Location: Mexico City, Mexico]
- Coordinates: 19°22′4″N 99°8′24″W

Jazzorca is Mexico City's most prominent dedicated free jazz and experimental music venue, founded by multi-instrumentalist Germán Bringas in 1994.

== Musicians ==
Mexican musicians who have played at Café Jazzorca are Bringas' group Zeropoint, Ernesto Andriano, Alain Cano, Gibrán Andrade, Iván Bringas, Carlos Alegre, Arturo Baez, Marcos Miranda, Ana Ruiz, Remi Alvarez, and Itzam Cano. Non-Mexican musicians who have played there are Marco Eneidi, Daniel Jodocy, Feike de Jong, Fabio Pellegrini, Misha Marks, Jasmine Lovell-Smith, Peeter Uuskyla, Frode Gjerstad, Alfonso Malfón, Michael Schulz, Martin High de Prime, Elliott Levin, Phillip Lauzier, Gabriel Lauber, and Darrell Zimmerman.

Nanahuatl was recorded at Café Jazzorca in December 2009 and released two years later. Artists include Germán Bringas, Iván Bringas, María Lipkau and Julian Bonequi.

== Jazzorca Records ==
Bringas founded the record label Jazzorca Records. Some of their recordings include:

- Bringas, Germán, Ser doble (Being double), Mexico, Jazzorca Records, 1994. Compositions of the author, Miroslav Vitous and Jan Garbarek.
- Bringas, German, La triste maquina de hacer arroz. (The sad machine to make rice), Mexico, Jazzorca-Option Sonica, 1997.
- Bringas, Germán and el Engrane Amarillo, Mexico, Jazzorca and Smogless Records, 1999. Compositions of the author.
- Zero Point, Zero Point (2005), Mexico, Jazzorca Records, 2005.
- Alvarez, Remi, Hernan Hecht, Darrell Zimmerman, Carlos Alegre, German Bringas, Itzam Cano, Gabriel Lauber, Free Radical Jazz. Recorded live at Cafe Jazzorca 2005–2007, Mexico, Jazzorca Records, 2007.
- Alonso, Chefa, Ana Ruiz, Adriana Camacho, et al. Free Jazz Women and Some Men, Jazzorca Records, 2015.
