= Angelakis =

Angelakis is a Greek surname. Notable people with the surname include:

- Andreas N. Angelakis (born 1937), Greek civil engineer and agronomist
- Dora E. Angelaki, Greek neuroscientist
- Jana Angelakis (born 1962), American fencer

== See also ==
- Angelaki, academic journal
