= Eudora =

Eudora may refer to:

== Places ==
- Eudora, Arkansas, a city
- Eudora, Kansas, a city
- Eudora Township, Douglas County, Kansas
- Eudora, Mississippi, an unincorporated community
- Eudora, Missouri, an unincorporated community

== Other ==
- 217 Eudora, an asteroid
- Eudora (album), an album by The Get Up Kids
- Eudora (band), a rock band from Orange County, California
- Eudora (email client)
- Eudora (mythology), the name of three nymphs in Greek mythology
- Eudora (Peanuts), a minor Peanuts comic strip character
- Eudora Internet Mail Server
- Eudora, a character voiced by Oprah Winfrey in the Disney animated film The Princess and the Frog (2009)

== People with the given name ==
- Eudora (given name)
- Eudora Stone Bumstead (1860–1892), American poet, hymnwriter
- Eudora Welty (1909–2001), an American writer
