= Doralice =

- Gender: Female

Other names
- Related names: Dora, Alice

Doralice is a female first name. It is often truncated to Dora or Alice in English. It may refer to:

- Doralice (footballer) (born 1963), Brazilian footballer
- Dora Nascimento (full name Doralice, born 1967), Brazilian politician

== Fictional characters ==
- Doralice in Orlando furioso by Ludovico Ariosto, who seems to have created the name in 1516
- Doralice in story 1.4 "Tebaldo and Doralice" (or simply "Doralice") of The Facetious Nights of Straparola by Giovanni Francesco Straparola, written in 1550
- Doralice in John Dryden's comedy, Marriage à la mode, written in 1672.
- Doralice in Antonio Salieri's opera Il ricco d'un giorno, written in 1784

== See also ==
- Euryphene doralice, a species of butterfly
