= Darrell Zimmerman =

Darrell Zimmerman is a Canadian free jazz musician, activist and a former floor trader convicted of wire fraud. The "Zimmerman Rule", named for him, prevents individuals who trade in the Chicago exchanges to profit from trades made over stipulated limits.

Zimmerman ran twice for mayor of Vancouver, both times unsuccessfully.

== Early life and education ==
Zimmerman was raised in Vernon, British Columbia. He was inspired to be a broker by an E. F. Hutton television ad, the life of a local successful broker, and Dr. Bruce G. Gould's How to Make Money in Commodities book.

Zimmerman studied music at Western Washington University.

== Career ==
=== Floor trader ===
==== Singer-Wenger ====
After working briefly trading in the Vancouver financial market, Zimmerman moved to Chicago and became a trader at the Chicago Board of Trade in 1985; He worked first as an entry-level clerk on the floor. Partly due to Zimmerman's "unusual speed" making financial calculations in his head, he was hired to work for the Singer-Wenger at the Chicago Mercantile Exchange; He was first assigned to the Standard & Poor's 500 Stock Price Index futures pit and then the live cattle futures options. He was fired on "Black Monday" (October 19, 1987) when he made risky and unauthorized transactions as the market was crashing; he lost $60,000. His wife, with whom he was arguing that day about his risky transactions, also lost her job at the exchange.

==== Other trading positions ====
Between 1987 and 1992 Zimmerman worked at a number of positions, but had a hard time dealing with the more complicated, risky market after Black Monday (1987). He often started situations successfully, and then was fired for his risky, unsuccessful and unauthorized trades; Zimmerman made puts and calls transactions above stipulated limits. Zimmerman then worked independently. The market was volatile when the Gulf War commenced [January 17, 1991]. He engaged in risky transactions which resulted in the loss of $150,000. He lost his seat on the Chicago Mercantile Exchange 20 days after it had been acquired and he owed First Commercial Financial Group $70,000.

One of the people who staked him in exchange for a share of his profits said, "Going through the markets is like going through psychoanalysis... If you have any self-destructive tendencies, the market is going to find them and hit you with them."

==== Lee B. Stern & Company ====
===== Floor trader =====
By 1992 Zimmerman was a floor trader at Lee B. Stern & Company where his "questionable billion-dollar trades jolted the Treasury bond market". (Note: The firm had not researched Zimmerman's history and had been warned by officials at the Chicago Mercantile of Zimmerman's trading history; They were told that Stern & Company could manage the risks.) On October 22, 1992, Zimmerman controlled $1.2 billion of futures on US 30-year treasury bonds backed by a bad check for $50,000. Unable to pay $8.5 million in margin calls, Lee B. Stern's owners' exchange memberships were suspended. Zimmerman's trading privileges were revoked. (Note: Darby said that it was a $8 million loss and The Washington Post said that it was a $9 million loss. Smith reported $7 million. However, Fishman, who most thoroughly researched and reported the story, said it was $8.5 million, $1.5 million of which was recovered from Catalfo's wins from that day. The net effect to Stern was $7 million.) Anthony Catalfo was named as an accomplice; both men were accused of trying to make a fortune by ignoring the limits placed on the trades. The men were accused of "taking a large stake in options that would make money if the price of Treasury bonds fell. They then sold a large number of Treasury bond futures contracts, which insured the price would drop." The market did just that, but before the bonds could be sold the price rebounded and then increased, resulting in a loss of $8.5 million. (Note: The transactions are described in "Step 19 – Strike it Rich", "Step 20 – Bollix your math" and "Step 21 – Blow your cover" of Fishman's Busted article.)

Journalist Ted Fishman wrote:

By the time Zimmerman was hauled out of the pits by Board of Trade security guards, he had ruined an old-line trading firm, threatened the Board of Trade with its first default in history, raised serious doubts about its trading system, and changed forever the way business on the world's futures exchanges is done. (Note: Fishman also said: "I traded against Zimmerman in the pits of the Chicago Mercantile Exchange for five years. To me he had always been a fascinating combination of skill, guts, and whimsy, a lightning-quick trader who refused to let the markets discipline him, a guy other traders bad-mouthed and envied. Zimmerman had a gift for talking people into giving him money. He exuded the enthusiasm many salesmen spend lifetimes trying to perfect. He seemed manic and easygoing at the same time. I talked to Zimmerman at length several times after his fiasco at the Board. He talked freely and enthusiastically, feeling all along that what he'd done was fully in the spirit and practice of Chicago's markets.")

Lee Stern covered the $8.5 million loss ($1.5 million from Catolfo), was forced to liquidate his company and subsequently rebuilt his status in the market.

===== Arraignment =====
Zimmerman left Chicago for Canada in July, 1993, just prior to his arraignment on federal fraud charges. In an interview with Worth Magazine several months later, Zimmerman commented upon the incident:

I thought then, "I'm a multimillionaire, I control the market now ..." You spend half of every day thinking about what would happen if you could trade large enough to move a market by yourself, to play like the big firms and banks do. I had everyone in the pit coming to me. I was the market. The exchanges just don't want to admit the market can be controlled by one guy, especially by someone like me, but I proved it can. Almost.

Zimmerman worked for a short time for Hera Resources, a gold and silver mining company in Canada. He was hired partly to assist with investor relations. He was to have received stock options at Hera, but when the company tried to file the transaction the connection was made by exchange investigators to Zimmerman's Chicago indictment. He was fired immediately from his job. Royal Canadian Mounted Police arrested Zimmerman in November 1993 and he fought extradition to the United States for several years.

===== Conviction, extradition and capture =====
In June 1994, while Zimmerman was evading extradition, Anthony Catalfo was convicted of six counts of fraud and sentenced to 42 months in jail.

He was convicted in 1995 of wire fraud for trying to manipulate the market. Zimmerman was arrested in Canada in July 1996, extradited back to the United States, and in September of that year pleaded guilty to two of six counts of wire fraud. He spent two years in jail, serving some time at the Metropolitan Correctional Center.

===== Zimmerman rule =====
His actions caused the Chicago Board of Trade and all Chicago exchanges to implement what has unofficially been called the "Zimmerman rule" prohibiting traders from profiting after having traded above the limit of their account; The clearing firms are allowed to keep the profits.

=== Advocacy and politics ===
Zimmerman unsuccessfully ran for mayor of Vancouver as an independent candidate in 2005.

In 2011 Zimmerman, resident of the Art Gallery encampment of the Occupy Vancouver Movement, tried to steal the Vancouver's City Hall's portrait of Christy Clark, the Premier of British Columbia. He was arrested and charged with theft, but was released after promising to stay out of City Hall.

He was a candidate for mayor in 2011. As a member of a group of Occupy Vancouver protesters he disrupted a mayoral debate on the subject of homelessness from which he had been excluded. Having caused a disturbance, Zimmerman was removed from the event.

=== Musical career ===
He appeared on the album Bandas de la Portales with Andres Motta and Gabriel Lauber issued by Jazzorca Records. Zimmerman played with Remi Alvarez, Hernan Hecht, Carlos Alegre, German Bringas, Itzam Cano, and Gabriel Lauber on the 2007 Free Radical Jazz. (Note: "Free Jazz Radicals" presents music from a pool of musicians who began to delve into the Free Jazz tradition in 2004. The recording mostly features the trio Zero Point.) It was recorded live at Cafe Jazzorca by Jazzorca Records.

Zimmerman plays the saxophone and trumpet.

== Personal life ==
In June 1987, Zimmerman married Lisa Tatkus, whom he met while working at the Chicago Mercantile Exchange. They had taken a trip to Canada but Zimmerman was not allowed to return to the United States without a work permit; The couple then married. Between 1987 and 1992, Zimmerman made and lost tens of thousands of dollars. He lost positions for his unsuccessful, unauthorized sales. During that time, the couple experienced financial disarray and moved several times to better and then less expensive housing. Zimmerman allegedly pawned his wife's wedding ring and other jewelry to buy a bus ticket to Canada, and left a note for his wife that said he was taking a vacation, although Lisa found the jewelry, including the wedding ring, in her belongings about a month later. Several years later, they divorced. After October 22, 1992, Lisa was also barred from the trading floor, not for her trading history but through association with her husband. When Zimmerman was imprisoned, Lisa was the only person on Zimmerman's visitor list.

Zimmerman wrote articles published in the Mexican business magazine, Expansion, revealing that he had come to Mexico with his family and was performing music in the Mexican free jazz scene. After two years in Mexico he returned to Vancouver.

== Electoral record ==
2005 Vancouver municipal election: Mayor
Party	Candidate	Votes	%	Elected
NPA	Sam Sullivan	61,543	47.34	✓
Vision	Jim Green	57,796	44.45	
Independent	James Green	4,273	3.29	
Work Less	Ben West	1,907	1.47	
Independent	Scott Yee	688	0.53	
Interest	Austin Spencer	456	0.35	
Independent	Pedro Mora	443	0.34	
Independent	Gölök Zoltán Buday	384	0.30	
Independent	John Landry Gray	355	0.27	
Independent	Mike Hansen	304	0.23	
Independent	Darrell Zimmerman	283	0.22	
Independent	Frank D'Agostino	275	0.21	
Independent	Ian W. Simpson	246	0.19	
Independent	Arthur Crossman	219	0.17	
Independent	Grant Chancey	198	0.15	
Independent	Ray Power	171	0.13	
Independent	Peter Raymond Haskell	144	0.11	
Independent	Malcolm G. MacLeod	140	0.11	
Independent	Joe Hatoum	96	0.07	
Independent	Eliot Esti	90	0.07	
Total votes		130,011	100.00	
NPA gain from COPE		Swing		–
