= Dora Juárez Kiczkovsky =

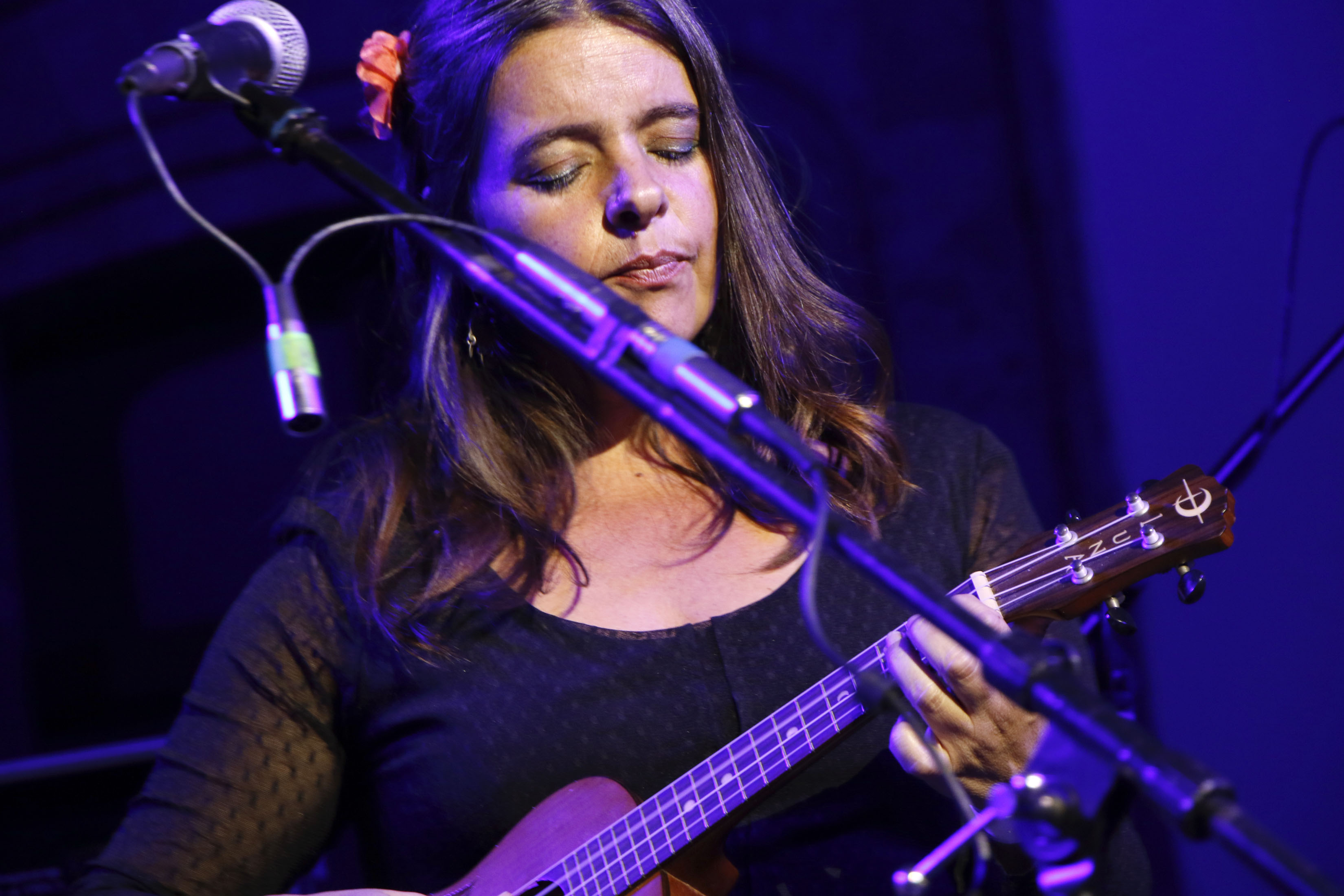
- Dora Juárez Kiczkovsky in 2019

Background information
- Born: Israel
- Genres: Ladino music, Sephardic music, Indie music
- Occupations: Singer, Composer, Author
- Instrument: voice
- Years active: 2001–present
- Labels: Tzadik Records, Intolerance, Jazzorca Records

Dora Juárez Kiczkovsky (Note: In this Mexican name, the surname is Juárez and the second or maternal family name is Kiczkovsky.) is a Mexican singer and filmmaker of Argentinian Jewish origin.

== Biography ==
Dora was born in Israel and grew up in Puebla, Mexico. Her parents emigrated from Argentina to Mexico during the 1976 military dictatorship. Her maternal grandparents were born in Poland, and survived the Holocaust; their parents were killed in concentration camps.

== Career ==
She studied cinematography at the Centro de Capacitación Cinematográfica film school, graduating Cum Laude. In the musical field, she studied at the Higher School of Music of the National Institute of Fine Arts of Mexico. She has been the recipient of three scholarships of the FONCA, the Mexican National Endowment for the Arts.

=== Music ===
Juárez makes compositions and performs them in different projects using experimentation and vocal improvisation. She is a soprano.

She was part of the vocal trio Muna Zul, together with Leika Mochán and Sandra Cuevas from 2002 to 2013, recording two albums: Muna Zul and Enviaje. Juárez is one of the few Mexican singers that have recorded with the American jazzist John Zorn's label Tzadik Records. With her 2014 album Cantos para una diáspora, Juárez paid homage to her roots through her own and contemporary versions of traditional Sephardic songs, as well as a track with her grandmother singing in Yiddish. Throughout her career, she has collaborated alongside several artists, including Juan Pablo Villa, Iraida Noriega, Martha Gómez, Susana Baca, Los cardencheros de Sapioriz, Marc Ribot, Sofía Rei, Germán Bringas, Leika Mochán, Sandra Cuevas, Jaime Ades, Francisco Bringas, Fernando Vigueras, Misha Marks, and others.

She has performed at venues in Mexico such as the Teatro de la Ciudad, the Palacio de Bellas Artes, the National Auditorium of Mexico and the Blas Galindo Hall, among others. She has toured the United States, France, Austria, Spain, Germany, Argentina, Chile, and Colombia.

=== Filmmaking ===
Her opera prima, the feature film Perpetuum Mobile, en busca de una voz, was shot in France, India, Argentina, and Mexico; it spoke about belonging and the metaphysical scope of the voice. In this documentary appear the Cardencheros de Sapioriz Durango (cardenche singing artists), the Cuncordi d'Orosei ensemble from Sardinia, Mola Syla from Senegal, the Dutch cellist Ernst Reijseger and the German filmmaker Werner Herzog, with whom he collaborated during the making of the soundtrack of his film The Wild Blue Yonder. She has also made several short films and produced and directed the series Érase una voz en México, consisting of 32 short documentaries about songs around this country.

== Works ==
=== Discography ===
==== Solo ====
- 2006: En la panza de una ballena (Jazzorca Records)
- 2013: Cantos para una diáspora (Tzadik Records, as part of the Radical Jewish Music series)

==== With Muna Zul ====
- 2002: Muna Zul (Tzadik Records, 2002)
- 2004: Enviaje (Intolerancia, 2004)

=== Other collaborations ===
- “La fiesta de los Bárbaros” with Juan Pablo Villa
- “Providencia” with La Barranca
- “Aquellos” with Jaime Ades

=== Filmography ===
- Érase una voz en México (32 short documentaries, FONCA, 2012).
- Perpetuum Mobile, en busca de una voz (76 min, documentary, 2008)
- El Sonido y el Silencio (45 min, documentary, 2006).
- Los últimos días (14 min, fiction, 2002).
- Toc Toc (5 min, fiction, 2001).

== Personal life ==
She has a son, Teo, born in 2015 after a high-risk pregnancy that had her cancel all her artistic engagements.
