= Barilla (surname) =

Barilla (or Barillà) is an Italian surname. Notable people with this surname include:

- Antonino Barillà (born 1988), Italian football central midfielder
- Antonino Barillà (born 1987), Italian sports shooter
- Dora Barilla (born 1969), American health care strategist
