= Jean Claude Mbanya =

Cameroonian professor of medicine and endocrinology

- Education: University of Newcastle
- Spouse: Dora Mbanya
- Awards: The Philip Sherlock Award, American Diabetes Association Harold Rifkin Award
- Scientific career
- Fields: Epidemiology of non-communicable diseases
- Workplaces: School of Life, Health and Environmental Sciences, the University Teaching Hospital in Yaoundé, University of Yaoundé I; International Diabetes Federation

Jean Claude Mbanya is a Cameroonian professor of medicine and endocrinology. He is the Dean Doctoral School of Life, Health and Environmental Sciences at the University of Yaoundé 1. He is a fellow of the African Academy of Sciences, the World Academy of Sciences and the Royal College of Physicians. He was a former President and currently the honorary leader of the International Diabetes Federation (IDF).

== Education ==
Mbanya obtained his medical degree from the University of Yaoundé in 1979. He received his PhD and MRCP from University of Newcastle upon Tyne. In 2011, he received a Doctor Philosophiae honoris causa from the University of Oslo for his contributions to the cause of diabetes.

== Career ==
Although Mbanya was awarded a scholarship to study chemical engineering at the formative part of his career, he was motivated to become a doctor by his father who had diabetes. He is a professor of medicine and endocrinology, the Postgraduate Dean of the Doctoral School of Life, Health and Environmental Sciences at the University of Yaoundé, and a Consultant Physician and Director of the National Obesity Centre at the University Teaching Hospital in Yaoundé.

== Research interests ==
Mbanya focused on epidemiology of non-communicable diseases which includes diabetes and its complications, ethno-pharmacology, molecular biology of diabetes, hypertension, thyroid diseases and their implications on the health care systems of developing countries.

== Membership and fellowship ==
Mbanya is a fellow of African Academy of Sciences, the World Academy of Sciences, Royal College of Physicians and Cameroon Academy of Sciences.

== Awards ==
In 2004, he received the American Diabetes Association Harold Rifkin Award for his international contributions to the cause of Diabetes and in 2009 he was also given the Philip Sherlock Award of the University Outreach Diabetes Group, Jamaica.

== Selected publications ==
- Prabhakaran, Dorairaj; et al. (2018). "Cardiovascular, respiratory, and related disorders: Key messages from Disease Control Priorities, 3rd edition". The Lancet. 391 (10126): 1224–1236. doi:10.1016/S0140-6736(17)32471-6. hdl:11336/186303. PMC 5996970. PMID 29108723.
- Ali, Mohammed K.; Siegel, Karen R.; Chandrasekar, Eeshwar; Tandon, Nikhil; Montoya, Pablo Aschner; Mbanya, Jean Claude; Chan, Juliana; Zhang, Ping; Narayan, K. M. Venkat; Montoya, P. A.; Mbanya, J. C.; Chan, J.; Zhang, P. (2017). "Diabetes: An Update on the Pandemic and Potential Solutions". Disease Control Priorities, Third Edition (Volume 5): Cardiovascular, Respiratory, and Related Disorders. pp. 209–234. doi:10.1596/978-1-4648-0518-9_ch12. ISBN 978-1-4648-0518-9. PMID 30212074.
- Sun, Hong; Saeedi, Pouya; Karuranga, Suvi; Pinkepank, Moritz; Ogurtsova, Katherine; Duncan, Bruce B.; Stein, Caroline; Basit, Abdul; Chan, Juliana C. N.; Mbanya, Jean Claude; Pavkov, Meda E.; Ramachandaran, Ambady; Wild, Sarah H.; James, Steven; Herman, William H. (January 2022). "IDF Diabetes Atlas: Global, regional and country-level diabetes prevalence estimates for 2021 and projections for 2045". Diabetes Research and Clinical Practice. 183 109119. doi:10.1016/j.diabres.2021.109119. hdl:20.500.11820/85919e8b-f73d-433d-a236-058a9561e24d. PMC 11057359. PMID 34879977.
- Mbanya, Jean Claude N.; Motala, Ayesha A.; Sobngwi, Eugene; Assah, Felix K.; Enoru, Sostanie T. (2010). "Diabetes in sub-Saharan Africa". The Lancet. 375 (9733): 2254–2266. doi:10.1016/S0140-6736(10)60550-8. PMID 20609971.
- Sobngwi, E.; Mbanya, J-C N.; Unwin, NC; Kengne, AP; Fezeu, L.; Minkoulou, EM; Aspray, TJ; Alberti, Kgmm (2002). "Physical activity and its relationship with obesity, hypertension and diabetes in urban and rural Cameroon". International Journal of Obesity. 26 (7): 1009–1016. doi:10.1038/sj.ijo.0802008. PMID 12080456.
- Fisher, Edwin B.; Boothroyd, Renée I.; Coufal, Muchieh Maggy; Baumann, Linda C.; Mbanya, Jean Claude; Rotheram-Borus, Mary Jane; Sanguanprasit, Boosaba; Tanasugarn, Chanuantong (2012). "Peer Support for Self-Management of Diabetes Improved Outcomes in International Settings". Health Affairs. 31 (1): 130–139. doi:10.1377/hlthaff.2011.0914. PMC 4128379. PMID 22232103.
