= Ryllis Barnes Simpson =

American dancer

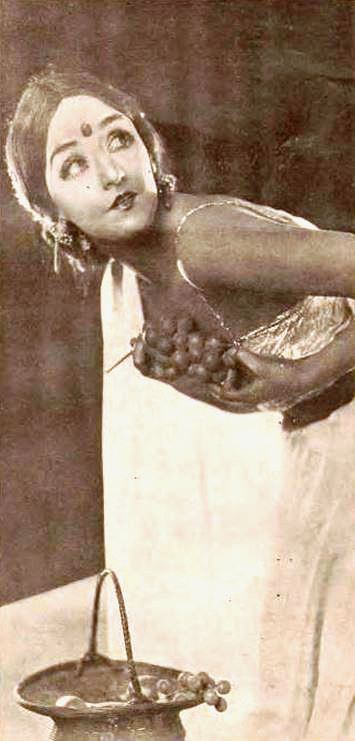
- Hasoutra, from a 1922 publication
- Born: Ryllis Barnes; September 24, 1900; St. Louis, Missouri, U.S.
- Died: February 18, 1978 (age 77); New York, New York, U.S.
- Other names: Hasoutra, Hazoutra, Rylis Hasoutra, Ryllis Hasoutra
- Occupations: Dancer, foreign service officer

Ryllis Barnes Simpson, also known as Ryllis Hasoutra (September 24, 1900 – February 18, 1978) was an American dancer and foreign service officer. Her dances, costumes, and public persona were in the "exotic" style similar to Ruth St. Denis, taking inspiration from India and Southeast Asia.

== Early life and education ==
Barnes was born in St. Louis, Missouri, and raised in Los Angeles, the daughter of John Barnes and Anna L Regan Barnes. She graduated from Hollywood High School in 1916, and attended classes at the Wallis School of Dramatic Art. She later studied dance in Paris and with Mary Wigman in Berlin. In publicity, she was said to be born in Shanghai, to an English artist father and a French mother.

== Career ==
=== Early career ===
Barnes began her stage career as a dancer in California; her "interpretive and inspiring dances" in San Diego were subject to concerns about immorality requiring a censor board's ruling in 1918. She signed an international touring contract with the Horley Musical Comedy Company in 1919, and performed in Shanghai and Siberia during that tour. A French artist named Roger Tournay painted a portrait of her around 1919, in which she wore a Burmese dancer's costume.

=== As Hasoutra ===
As "Hasoutra", Barnes performed dances loosely inspired by India and Southeast Asia, including a "snake dance", a peacock dance, and a "golden idol dance". She was in Broadway shows including The Perfect Fool (1921), Spice of 1922, and The Passing Show of 1923. She danced in Indianapolis in 1923 with Nora Bayes' company, toured internationally with Dora Duby in the 1920s and 1930s, and appeared in vaudeville programs across the United States, "clad in very little besides a coat of gleaming gold paint". Later in the 1930s, she lived and worked in Southern California and toured in Latin America with partner Horace Okey.

=== Later government work ===
In 1947, Barnes received the Meritorious Civilian Service Award for her wartime government service. She worked in the Office of Dependency Benefits in New York. From 1952 to 1972, she worked for the United States Department of State as a foreign service officer.

== Reception ==
Reviewers were often unimpressed by Hasoutra. "Her work reveals none of the deep beauty of the East," a critic in The New York Times wrote in 1928, while noting that Haitian pianist Justin Elie, Indian performers Lota and Sarat Lahiri, and Japanese dancer Michio Ito were on the same recital program. In 1934, John Martin described her as having "a certain fragile charm", but as "scarcely more authentic in her own native dances than in her exotic ones." The Brooklyn Eagle also found her 1934 performance lacking, concluding that Hasoutra "has a distinctly exotic and interesting personality, but she has not as yet found the particular form in which she may best project it."

== Personal life ==
Ryllis Barnes Simpson died in 1978, probably in her late seventies, in New York City.
