= Musielak =

Musielak is a Polish surname. Notable people with the surname include:

- Andreas Musielak, chief operating officer of DENIC, a German domain management cooperative
- Dora Musielak, Mexican-American aerospace engineer, historian of mathematics, and book author
- Rafał Musielak, player in the winning team of the 2000–01 Polish Volleyball League
- Ryszard Musielak (born 1950), Polish labor union leader and anti-communist activist
- Sebastian Musielak, Polish translator of Finnish fantasy novel Not Before Sundown
- Sławomir Musielak (born 1990), Polish motorcyclist
- Stephen Musielak, former pastor at Our Lady of Czestochowa Parish, Boston
- Tobiasz Musielak (born 1993), Polish motorcyclist
- Walenty Musielak (1913–1977), Polish footballer
