= Elisabeth Noltenius =

German artist

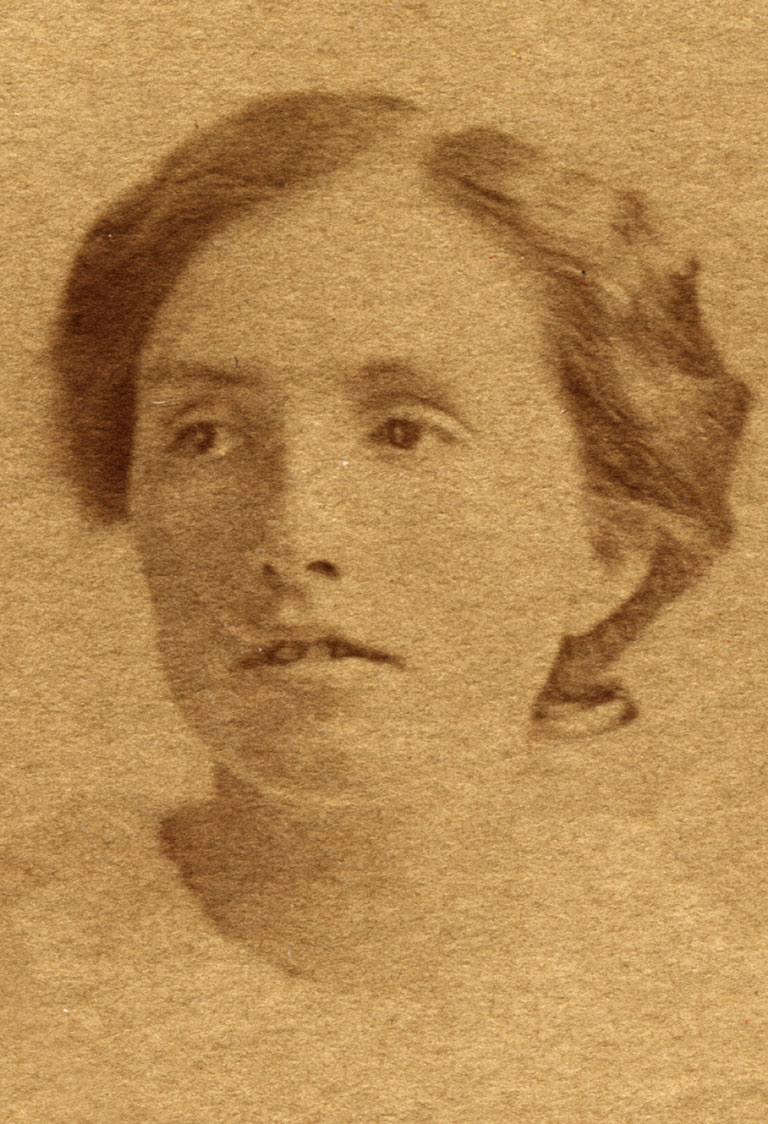
- Noltenius in 1914
- Born: 24 January 1888; Bremen, Germany
- Died: 22 February 1964 (aged 76); Bremen, Germany
- Known for: Painting

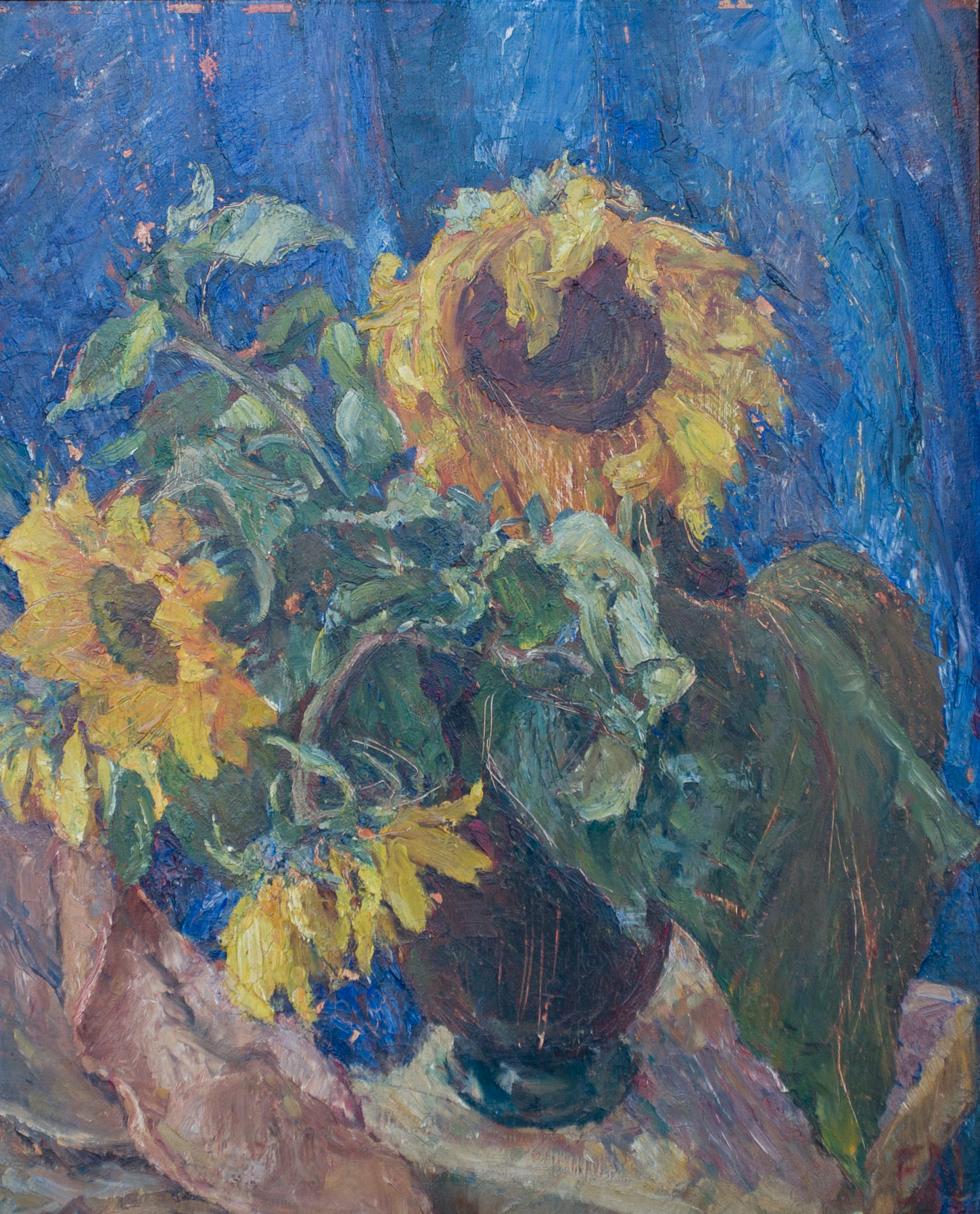
Sonnenblumen

Elisabeth Noltenius (24 January 1888 - 22 February 1964) was a German painter.

== Biography ==
Noltenius was born on 24 January 1888 in Bremen, Germany. She first studied etching with Hans am Ende and sculpture with Clara Westhoff. In 1911 she went to Munich to attend the Damenakademie (Ladies’ Academy). After the deaths of her brothers, sister, father, and fiancé during the years of the First World War Noltenius settled back in Bremen to support herself and her mother. For a time she had a studio in nearby Meyenburg. She painted landscapes, still lifes, and portraits.

In the interwar years Noltenius traveled to France (Paris specifically), Hungary, Italy, Norway, and Spain.

Noltenius remained in Germany during World War II. She attempted to protect her friend and fellow artist Dora Bromberger from persecution by the Nazis. She organized exhibitions in an attempt to save Bromberger from deportation, but despite her efforts Bromberger was deported and murdered in a concentration camp in 1942. Noltenius' Bremen studio and most of the artwork in it were destroyed by a bomb in 1944. She built a new studio in Meyenburg in 1949.

Noltenius died on 22 February 1964 in Bremen. Her work is in the Focke Museum and the Kunsthalle Bremen.
