= Dora Mbanya =

Cameroonian professor of Haematology

Dora Ngum Shu Mbanya
- Born: Dora Ngum Shu; 13 December 1956 (age 69); Northwest, Cameroon, West Africa
- Citizenship: Cameroon
- Education: Newcastle upon Tyne, University of Abidjan
- Known for: identification of a new subgenotype of hepatitis b virus (a3), hepatitis delta and c strains.
- Spouse: Jean Claude Mbanya
- Scientific career
- Fields: Blood transfusion medicine and clinical use of blood.
- Workplaces: University of Yaoundé I, Africa Society for Women and Aids in Africa, Africa Society for Blood Transfusion

Dora Ngum Shu Mbanya (born 13 December 1956) is a Cameroonian Professor of Haematology at the University of Yaoundé I (UYI) and the head of the Cameroon branch of Africa Society for Women and Aids in Africa.

== Biography ==
Dora Mbanya was born on 13 December 1956 in the North West region of Cameroon. She is a physician and specialises in haematology. She obtained a medical degree in General Medicine from cameroon and bagged her PhD in Medicine/Haematology from Newcastle upon Tyne, England. She holds a Dîplome Universitaire in Transfusion Medicine from the Université d'Abidjan, Côte d'Ivoire. She is also the General Manager of the National Blood Transfusion Service in Cameroon and the president of Africa Society for Blood Transfusion. She is married to another professor of Medicine and Endocrinology, Jean Claude Mbanya.

== Research interests ==
Dora Mbaya focused on blood transfusion medicine, clinical use of blood; transfusion-transmissible infections (TTIs) like hepatitis B, C, Syphilis, and HIV.

== Scientific contributions ==
Dora and her team was able identify a new subgenotype of hepatitis b virus (a3), hepatitis delta and c strains. they also identified the horizontal transmission of the group n, hiv-1 and an hiv-2 intergroup recombinant strain. In their work, they proved that primary drug resistance in drug-naïve HIV-infected people, and illustrated widely the HIV-1 genetic diversity in Cameroon. These contributions have led to the production of diagnostics assays for detecting diverse HIV strains in clinical specimens.

== Selected publications ==
- Mbanya, Dora; Binam, Fidele; Kaptue, Lazare (2001-01-01): Transfusion outcome in a resource-limited setting of Cameroon: A five-year evaluation:
- Mbanya, Dora; Ateudjieu, Jerome; Tagny, Claude Tayou; Moudourou, Sylvie; Lobe, Marcel Monny; Kaptue, Lazare (2010). "Risk Factors for Transmission of HIV in a Hospital Environment of Yaoundé, Cameroon
- Anye, Angwafor; Tasha, Ngwanui; Njamnshi, Alfred; Mbanya, Dora: Chronic pain amongst HIV-infected adults followed-up at the Bamenda Regional Hospital, Cameroon
- Mbanya, Dora: Barriers and enablers to introducing comprehensive patient blood management in the hospital
- Tagny, Claude Tayou; Mbanya, Dora; Murphy, Edward L.; Lefrère, Jean-Jacques; Laperche, Syria: Screening for hepatitis C virus infection in a high prevalence country by an antigen/antibody combination assay versus a rapid test
- Mbanya, Dora Ngum; Zebaze, Roger; Minkoulou, Etienne-Magloire; Binam, Fidele; Koulla, Sinata; Obounou, Akong: Clinical and epidemiologic trends in HIV/AIDS patients in a hospital setting of Yaounde, Cameroon: a 6-year perspective
- Mbanya, Dora; Assah, Felix; Ndembi, Nicaise; Kaptue, Lazare: Monitoring antiretroviral therapy in HIV/AIDS patients in resource-limited settings: CD4 counts or total lymphocyte counts?
