= Dorinda =

Dorinda is a feminine given name, related to Dora, and its variants. It may refer to:

== People ==
- Dorinda Keenan Borer (born 1963), American businessperson and politician
- Dorinda Clark-Cole (born 1957), American evangelist and gospel singer, member of The Clark Sisters
- Dorinda Connor (1947–2024), American politician
- Dorinda Cox (born 1976), Australian politician
- Dorinda Hafner, Ghanaian-born Australian storyteller, actress, dancer, choreographer, public speaker, writer and television chef
- Dorinda Medley (born 1964), American television personality - see The Real Housewives of New York City
- Dorinda Moreno, American Chicana activist, feminist and writer
- Dorinda Morgan, a music producer - see Becoming the Beach Boys: The Complete Hite & Dorinda Morgan Sessions
- Dorinda Neligan (1833–1914), Irish-born English headmistress and suffragette
- Dori Sanders (born 1934), African-American novelist and food writer
- Dorinda Stevens (1932–2012), British actress

== Fictional characters ==
- Dorinda, a nymph in the 1590 play Il pastor fido
- Dorinda, in Dryden's 1667 comedy The Tempest
- Dorinda, a major character in the 1707 play The Beaux' Stratagem
- Dorinda, a major character in Handel's 1733 opera seria Orlando
- Dorinda Durston, the love interest in the 1943 film A Guy Named Joe and the 1989 remake Always
- Dorinda Rogers, one of the main characters in The Cheetah Girls (novel series)

== See also ==
- Porphyrosela dorinda, a species of moth
- Darinda, a Pakistani Urdu film released in 2002
- Derinda Township, Jo Daviess County, Illinois
- Maťo Ďurinda (born 1961), member of the Slovak hard rock/heavy metal band Tublatanka
