= Lee Stern =

American commodities trader and sports owner

Lee B. Stern
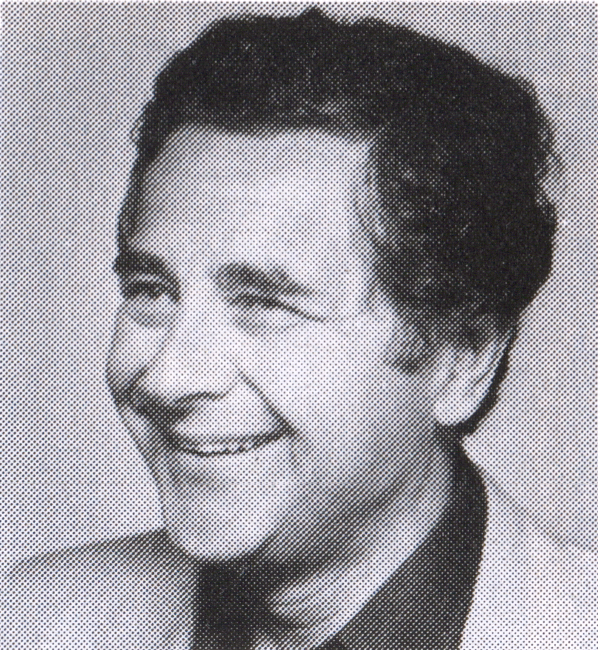
- Stern circa 1984
- Born: December 27, 1926 (age 99); Chicago, Illinois, U.S.
- Occupation: Commodities trader
- Known for: minority owner of the Chicago White Sox
- Spouse: Norma Retchin
- Children: 4

Lee B. Stern (born December 27, 1926) is the longest tenured trader at the Chicago Board of Trade. He has been one of the most successful traders in the commodities market throughout his membership, and is well known for his involvement in the Chicago sports scene. He was the President of the North American Soccer League's Chicago Sting, and remains a director and minority owner of the Chicago White Sox.

== Early life ==
Born to a Jewish family, Stern attended Senn High School. Upon graduation in 1945, he attended the University of Illinois and enlisted in the Army Air Corps cadet program and reported for active duty in 1945. After serving two years including a stint in the army of occupation in Germany, he attended Roosevelt University in Chicago, before starting at the Chicago Board of Trade. Lee married Norma Retchin in 1951. They have 4 children, 11 grandchildren and 8 great-grandchildren.

== Professional success ==
Stern began his career as a clerk for Merrill Lynch in December 1947. After a successful run of twenty years in futures and options trading, Stern opened a clearing firm, Lee B. Stern & Company in 1967.

== Soccer ==
Stern founded the Chicago Sting of the NASL and MISL in 1974 and led the team until it folded in 1988. In their 14-year history, the Sting won two NASL championships (Soccer Bowl), in 1981 and 1984. Stern also served as Chairman of the NASL Executive Committee in 1981 and 1982 as well as Chairman of the MISL Executive Committee from 1986 - 1988. Stern was a member of the U.S. World Cup Founder's Club which and served as one of the major participants in bringing the World Cup to Chicago. He was inducted into the National Soccer Hall of Fame on October 25, 2003.

== Baseball ==
Stern has also been long-associated with the Chicago White Sox, where he is a minority owner and serves on the team's board of directors.

== Victim of illegal activities ==
On October 22, 1992, Darrell Zimmerman of Chicago, Illinois and Anthony Catalfo of Bayside, Queens, New York, attempted to manipulate the US Treasury bond futures and options market of the Chicago Board of Trade (CBOT). The gist of the scam was to depress prices long enough for Zimmerman and Catalfo to turn a sizable profit. Catalfo reportedly profited approximately $1,500,000 but Zimmerman lost nearly $9,000,000, for which his clearing firm, Lee B. Stern & Company, would be held liable. After the suspension of trading and clearing privileges of Lee B. Stern & Company and its three principals Lee Stern, son Daniel Stern, and Lester Moucher, the Chicago Board of Trade had the suspension expunged on October 28, 1992.

A CBOT arbitration panel found Zimmerman and Catalfo guilty of fraud and conspiracy, fining Zimmerman $1,500,000 and Catalfo $750,000 and ordered them jointly liable to Lee B. Stern & Co. for $8.6 million in damages. On July 6, 1994, Catalfo was found guilty of six counts of wire fraud by a Federal jury and sentenced to 42 months in prison. Zimmerman fled to Vancouver, BC Canada and fought extradition.

== Redemption ==
Stern, the president of LBS Limited Partnership, celebrated his 70th anniversary as a Chicago Board of Trade member on November 8, 2019.

Stern's motto has been quoted as: "You can't buy integrity and once you lose it no amount of money can buy it back."

Stern's other motto is "Take care of number one and then number two will take care of itself."
