= Dora Bromberger =

German painter

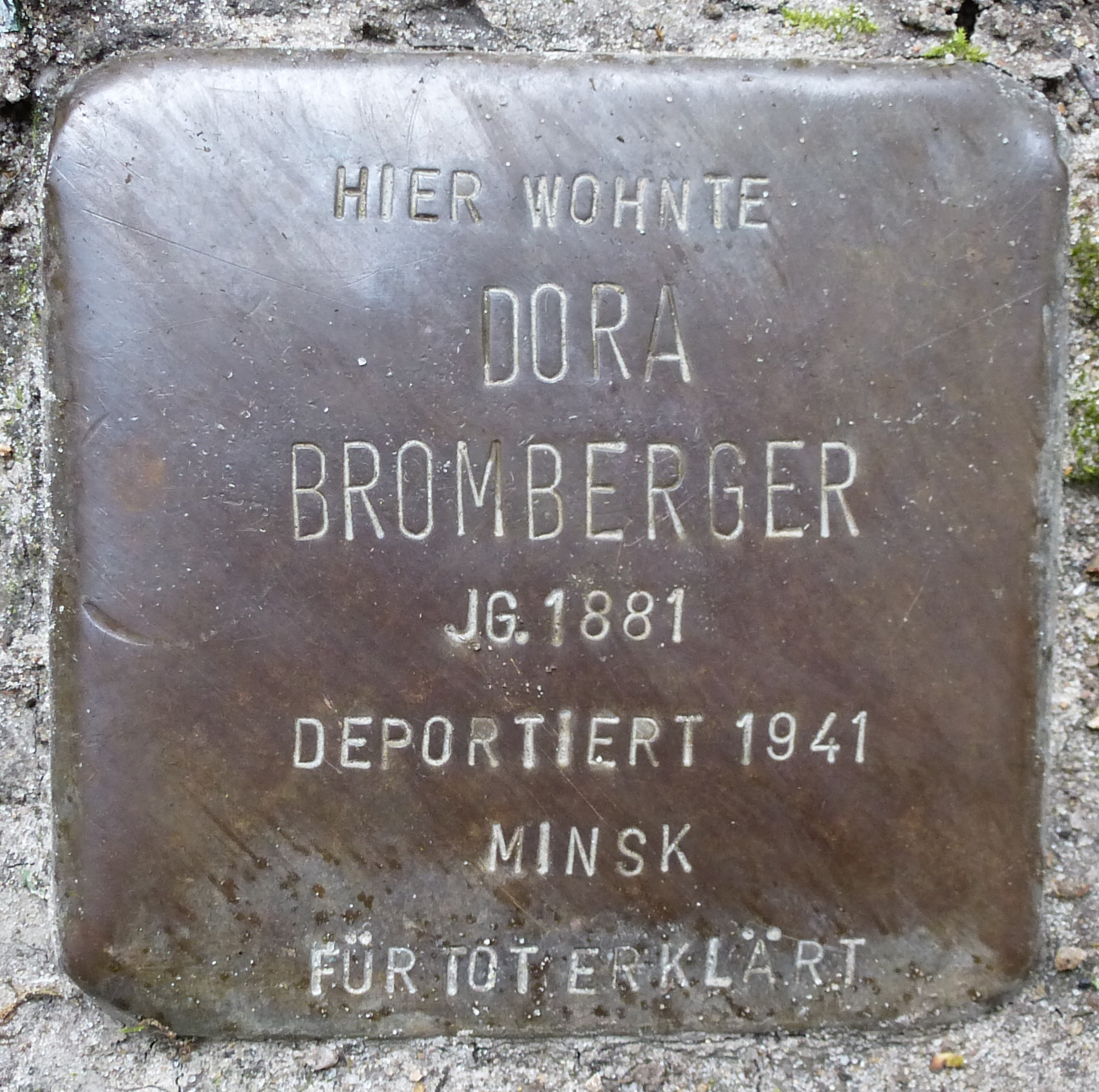
- Stolperstein for Dora Bromberger in Bremen
- Born: June 16, 1881; Bremen, German Empire
- Died: July 28, 1942 (aged 61); Minsk, Byelorussian SSR, Soviet Union

Dora Bromberger (1881–1942) was a German artist who worked primarily with watercolor and oils, painting expressionist landscapes.

She was born into a family of musicians in Bremen, Germany, and attended art school beginning in 1912, first in Bremen, then in Munich, and later in Paris. Her work was shown internationally as well as in the Kunsthalle Bremen and the 1928 exhibition Deutscher Kunst der Gegenwart (German Contemporary Art) in Nuremberg. Born into a Jewish family, she converted to the evangelical church in 1888. With the increasing influence of the National Socialists, she was continually harassed for her religious heritage. While her brother successfully immigrated to Cuba in 1939, Bromberger was unable to leave the country. The painter Elisabeth Noltenius remained a close friend and supported her during this time despite interrogations by the Gestapo. In 1941, she was deported to Minsk and sent to the Maly Trostenets concentration camp, where she was murdered in 1942.
