= Dora Rosetti =

Greek gynaecologist (1908–1989)

- Born: Nelli Kaloglopoulou (Νέλλης Καλογλοπούλου-Μπογιατζόγλου); 1908; Alexandria, Egypt
- Died: April 1989 (aged 80–81); Athens, Greece
- Education: Athens University
- Occupations: Gynaecologist, writer
- Spouse: Kostikas Bogiatzoglou

Dora Rosetti (1908 – April 1989) was a medical doctor specialising in gynaecology, sexual health, disease and public health. She wrote Her Lover, published in 1929 and again in 2005.

== Personal life and education ==
Eleni (or Nelli) Kaloglopoulou (Greek: Νέλλης Καλογλοπούλου-Μπογιατζόγλου) was born in Alexandria, Egypt in 1908 and died in Athens, Greece in April 1989. She studied at the Medical School of Athens University. After graduating from university, she worked as a doctor mostly in Greece, but also in Egypt and in Libya. She specialised in public health and completed a PhD in medicine. She married Kostikas Bogiatzoglou (1895–1967), a diaspora Greek from Romania.

Outside her profession, she enjoyed mountaineering, cave exploration (together with Anna Petroheilou, a well-known cave-explorer), played tennis and was a classical music lover. From 1961 until her death in 1989, she lived in Athens.

== Her Lover (1929) ==
As a young writer Kaloglopoulou-Bogiatzoglou contributed to the literary journal for talented young persons Diaplasis ton Paidon (Cultivating the Young), edited by literary critic and writer Grigorios Ksenopoulos. Through the journal she developed a literary and artistic group of friends. Poets Giorgos Tsoukalas and G. Simiriotis read her literary journal, edited it into a novel, gave it an ending and, with her agreement, published it in 1929 as Her Lover using the pseudonym Dora Rosetti.

The book caused a scandal in its time due to its taboo topic of love between women. Also, due to careless editing, there was enough biographical detail for the real-life main characters to be identifiable. As a result, the author, alone or with her girlfriend, and under the weight of significant social pressure, opprobrium and shame, gathered existing copies from bookstores and destroyed many of them. The book subsequently disappeared.

Rosetti maintained a literary journal throughout her life however after the uproar caused by Her Lover she destroyed all of her other writing and archive.

=== Rediscovery ===
Christina Dounia, professor of Modern Greek Language and Literature at the University of Crete, rediscovered Her Lover in two private libraries - the Eleutheriadis residence in Petra, Lesvos and the Kavafy archive - where there is a copy inscribed by the author to the Alexandrian poet. She republished it in 2005, with an accompanying afterword. The real identity of Rosetti was unknown and became a matter of feverish speculation among journalists, literary critics, authors and the book-reading public of Greece.

=== Eleni Bakopoulou ===
Rosetti's work and life came to light partly through the discussions that she had with the activist and researcher Eleni Bakopoulou, who had sought her out in the 1980s. Bakopoulou kept Rosetti's testimony and texts, promising not to publish anything while Rosetti was still alive.

After Dounia's 2005 reprint of Her Lover Bakopoulou published the autobiographical testimony that Rosetti had given her, together with Bakopoulou's own account of their meeting, Rosetti's earlier texts from Diaplasis ton Paidon and material from Rosetti's drawing and poetry journal in two issues of 2006 Odos Panos journal. In 2012 these texts were published as a book My Friend Mrs Dora Rosetti (Pub. Odos Panos Publications).

=== 2005 reprint ===
After its first reprint in 2005, Her Lover had further reprints in 2006, 2011 and 2013. Included in the publication is also Grigorios Ksenopoulos's book review of Her Lover written in 1929 from the literary review journal Nea Estia. In 2017 the book was translated and published in English, French and Italian as "The Two Lovers", Les Deux Amantes and Le due Amanti. Les Deux Amantes and Le due Amanti.
