= Itzam Cano =

Mexican jazz double bassist

Itzam Cano (born 1977) is a Mexican jazz double bassist.

== Biography ==
Cano was born in 1977 in Mexico City, Mexico. He studied ethnomusicology at the Escuela Nacional de Música from the National Autonomous University of Mexico. He studied electric bass and contrabass and the development of improvisation, jazz theory, and harmony.

In late 2005, he joined free jazz ensemble Zero Point. In September 2006, Zero Point participated in the Japanese New Music Festival (Tatsuya Yoshida, Makoto Kawabata y Atsushi Tsuyama), at Multiforo Alicia in Mexico City. By 2007, Zero Point released its first digital album for Ayler Records.

He has worked with Elliot Levin, Marco Eneidi, Dennis, Stefan y Aarón Gonzales, Dave Dove, Shelley Hirsch, Scott Forrey, Milo Tamez, Tom Corona, Lawrence Williams, and Generación Espontánea.

Since 2004 he has performed at the Ollin Jazz Tlalpan Internacional, Festival de Improvisación Libre, Free Jazz y Noise "Cha'ak'ab Paaxil" (with sede in Mérida, Yucatán), Festival Internacional de las Americas in La Habana, Cuba and in festivals in cities like Puebla, Guadalajara, and Zacatecas.

He has been a member of the bands Antimateria, Zero Point, Claude Lawrence trío and has been part of the Orquesta Sinfónica de Puebla and the Orquesta de Percutoris from the Escuela Nacional de Música at the National Autonomous University of Mexico (ENM-UNAM).

== Selected ensembles ==
- Antimateria
- Claude Lawrence Trío
- Zero Point

== Major collaborators ==
- Remi Álvarez
- Germán Bringas
- Claude Lawrence
