= Dora Acuña =

Paraguayan poet, journalist and radio personality

Dora Gómez Bueno de Acuña (1903 in Luque – 1987) was a Paraguayan poet, journalist and radio personality. She carried out her studies in Escuela Normal de Asunción, the institute where she graduated with the title of teacher.

Influenced by the Uruguayan poet Delmira Agustini, Dora Acuña's poetry celebrated life and nature with a frank eroticism.

== First Steps ==
She taught primary education for many years, and briefly contributed, between 1930 and 1931, to the 'Sociales' page of the 'El Orden' newspaper of Asunción.

Her work in radio included acting in children's programs, reciting local and foreign poetry, and participating in various radio series throughout her career. She was involved in Sobremesa de Gala, which was broadcast on Radio Nacional and Radio Ñanduti in Asunción, Paraguay.

== Works ==
- Flor de caña, poesías (Reed flower), Asunción: Imprenta nacional, 1940
- Barro celeste (Heavenly mud), Asunción: Imprenta nacional, 1943
- Luz en el abismo (Light in the Abyss), Asunción: Indoamericana, 1954
- Vivir es decir (Living is saying), Asunción: [s.n.], 1977
- Antología, Asunción: Alcándara, 1985

== See also ==
- Culture of Paraguay
