= Dora Russell (disambiguation) =

Dora Russell may refer to:

- Dora Russell (1894-1986), British author, feminist, socialist campaigner
- Dora Isella Russell (1925-1990) Argentine-born Uruguayan poet, journalist
- Dora Oake Russell (1912-1986), writer and educator in Newfoundland
