= Dora Trigueras =

Mexican politician

- Born: 1 May 1982 (age 44); Aconchi, Sonora, Mexico
- Occupation: Politician
- Political party: PAN

Dora Evelyn Trigueras Durón (born 1 May 1982) is a Mexican politician from the National Action Party. From 2009 to 2012 she served as Deputy of the LXI Legislature of the Mexican Congress representing Sonora.
