= Andreas N. Angelakis =

Greek civil engineer and agronomist

Andreas N. Angelakis (April 15, 1937, Vachos, Heraklion, Crete) is a Greek Civil Engineer of Water Resources (University of California, Davis) and Agronomist (Agricultural University of Athens). His wife is Kalliopi (Popy) A. Roubelakis-Angelakis, Emeritus Professor of Biology, University of Crete.

== Studies ==
He completed his undergraduate studies and holds a degree in agricultural sciences from the Agricultural University of Athens (1962) and a Bachelor of Sciences in civil engineering from the University of California, Davis, USA (1976). He also completed postgraduate studies at the University of California, Riverside, USA, holding an M.S. (Master of Sciences) in Soil Science (1974) and at the University of California, Davis, USA, from where he received an M.S. in Water Resources (1977), and Ph.D. in Soil Physics (1981).

== Scientific interests ==
His research interests include technologies of wastewater treatment and reuse, small and decentralized water management systems, and water-related technologies in ancient civilizations.

In recent years he has collaborated with international Water Association (IWA). With a growing global awareness of the importance of long-term management of water resources and wastewater in ancient civilizations, He has co-organized and participated in more than 35 international conferences.

== Career ==
He has served as agronomist at the Greek Ministry of Agriculture (1964-1967), Director at the Agricultural School of Messara, Crete (1967-1973), water resources engineer at the Land and Water Improvement Services of the Ministry of Agriculture (1979-1980), and water resources engineer at the National Agricultural Research Foundation (N.AG.RE.F.), Institute of Crete (1993-2008). He was also adjunct professor at the Technical University of Crete, Chania (1989-2008); technical consultant at the Hellenic Association of Municipal Water and Sewerage Enterprises (EDEYA, 1991-2018) and technical advisor of FAO on wastewater treatment and reuse (1996-2018). He also was an elected member of the Administrative Board of N.AG.RE.F. (1993-1997).

He was president of the European Federation of National Water and Wastewater Services Associations (EUREAU, 2008-2009) and member of its Administrative Board for 16 years (1993-2009). He was also Chairman of the EUREAU Working Group (WG) on Wastewater Reuse (2001-2007), member of the International Association on Water Pollution Research (IAWPR, 1980-1999) and the International Association for Quality (IAWQ) and member of the WG Board for Water Recycling and Reuse (1991-2005).

He has been a member of the International Water Association (IWA) since its foundation (2000). He was president of the IWA Specialist Group (SG) for Water in Ancient Cultures (WAC) (2005-2019). In October 2019, he was elected President of the new Joint IWA-IWHA (International Water History Association) SG of Water Resources in Ancient Civilizations (WAC). He was also member of the IWA Strategic Council (2016-2019).

== Honors and awards ==
2024 He was honored for selflessness contribution to the Association of Municipal Water Supply and Sewerage Companies and the Municipal Water Supply and Sewerage Companies of Greece.

2023 He was awarded and honored for his contribution to the Holocaust Museum of Viannou and Ierapetra by the Mayor of Municipality of Viannos, Iraklion, Greece and the President of Museum

2022 He was awarded honorary distinction by the Hellenic Hydro-technical Association of Aristotle University of Thessaloniki, Thessaloniki, Greece.

2021 Honorary doctorate of the Agricultural University of Athens, Athens, Greece

2021 Member of French Water Academy, Paris, France

2019 Honorary Professor of Hubei University, Wuhan, China

2005-2018 Chair-person of IWA SG (Special Group) on WAC (Water in Ancient Civilizations).

2018 Member of the European Academy of Sciences and Arts (EASA)

2018 Chair-person of Joint IWA /IWHA SG on Water History

2016-2019 Member of IWA Strategic Council

2015 Distinguished Fellow of IWA

2014 He was awarded honorary distinction by the Hellenic Committee of the International Association of Hydrogeology.

2012 Fellow of IWA

2011 Honorary Member of Hellenic Water Association (HWA)

2010 Honorary Member of IWA

2008-2009 President of European Federation of National Water and Wastewater Services Association (EUREAU)

2001-2007 Chairperson of Working Group on Water Reuse of EUREAU

1993-2009 Member of the Board of Directors of EUREAU

1993-1997 Elected Member of the Board of the National Foundation for Agricultural Research (N.AG.RE.F.)

1967-1973 Appointed Director Agricultural School of Iraklion (Messara), Crete, Greece.

== Publications, Books and more ==
The history of water is equivalent to the history of the world and the history of water quality is equivalent to the history of life.

A. N. Angelakis

There is no life without water; by studying ancient civilizations we explore ourselves and learn from the past.

A. N. Angelakis

He has authored or co-authored more than 500 publications, including articles in high ranked international scientific journals, chapters in Greek, English and Chinese books, with more than 9,500 Google citations and an i10 index of 135.

== Participation in scientific events ==
He has been invited/participated in more than 200 scientific events with corresponding lectures in Greece and abroad. Finally, he is Editor and member of the editorial boards of many international organizations, especially the in journals of IWA.
