= D. J. Potter =

Australian children's author

Dora Joan Potter
- Born: 1915
- Died: 1987 (aged 71–72)
- Occupation: children's author

Dora Joan Potter (1915–1987) was an Australian children's author. She is best remembered for her novels set in the fictional Winterton girls boarding school.

She worked as a secretary at the University of Adelaide, became an expert maths typist, and retired in 1976. She never married and died from cancer on 5 February 1987 at Fulham, South Australia. Her books were popular in their time.

== Bibliography ==
- Pam Pays Her Debt (1945)
- Those Summer Holidays (1946)
- Margaret's Decision (1947)
- Helen's Inheritance (1950)

Winterton School series

- With Wendy at Winterton School (1945)
- Wendy Moves Up (1947)
- Wendy in Charge (1947)
- Althea's Term at Winterton (1948)
- Winterton Holiday Cruise (1949)
- A New Girl for Winterton (1950)
