= Eudora (band) =

American rock band

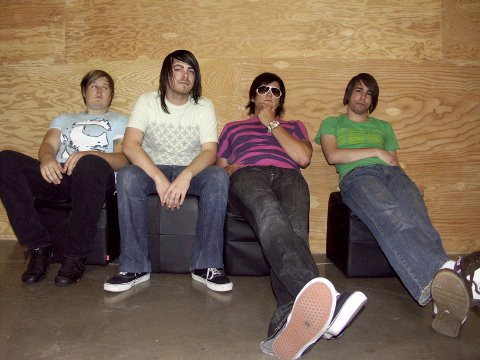

Background information
- Origin: Orange County, California, U.S.
- Genres: Indie rock, alternative rock, post-hardcore, pop punk
- Years active: 2005–2010
- Labels: World Artist Records, Powerslave Records
- Members: Brandon Ball; Tim Markel; Nick DeRosa; Kevin Connor
- Past members: David Tom; Petr Coraza Gambino; Gavin Miller; Mike Crisis; Michael Stahl; Justin McCarthy; Robby Friend; Tony Kim
- Website: myspace.com/eudoramusic

Eudora is an American rock band from Orange County, California, signed to Power Slave Records in Japan. They have released two studio albums: ...And it Rained Machines (2006) and The Silent Years (2008).

== History ==
=== The beginning ===
Eudora was formed in Orange County in 2005 by Robby Friend and Kevin Connor. They met Tim Markel soon afterwards through the social networking site MySpace and started rehearsing. It was evident that the three of them "clicked" and they began to write original songs. Through a friendship with the band National Product, they were introduced to actor and singer David Tom. With the addition of Tom as lead singer and Peter Coranza as drummer, the band started playing shows in and around Southern California. The venue Chain Reaction in Anaheim became a home base of operation as they played there on regular basis while honing their original sound. In early 2006, the band began work on its first album ...And It Rained Machines. A music video for the song "Breakfast of a Killer" was directed by Justin Janowitz. Eudora's CD ...And It Rained Machines received a distribution deal with World Artist Records, which made the CD available to a much larger audience at Hot Topic, Amazon.com and iTunes. The CD earned the band enough attention that they were rewarded with their first spot on the annual Vans Warped Tour, playing both the Los Angeles and the Pomona dates of the 2006 tour on the DIY stage. All the while, Eudora had a series if rotating drummers with Mike Crisis (also known as Mr. Pink Jacket) lasting the longest. About a year after ...And It Rained Machines hit shelves, the band went into the studio to demo some new songs for a potential Japanese record label that had expressed interest in the band.

Around December 2006, after the record deal talk dissipated, Eudora released those demos onto their Myspace page. Those two songs ("Addiction" and "Ruining a Movie You've Never Seen For a Group Of People You Don't Really Know") slowly worked their way into the band's live set, replacing songs like "Gold in the Storm" and "Mishaps and Circumstances". In October of that same year, the band won a contest for a coveted opening slot for A Static Lullaby at The Troubadour in Hollywood. A small tour was planned for January 2007, but due to personal, professional and musical differences, it was decided that Tom would leave the band after one last December show at Chain Reaction.

=== Scarves & Barfs ===
The tour of the southwest happened as planned, with Tim and Mike sharing the vocal duties. The tour supporting fellow band, "Victory Within" started in Southern California and followed through Arizona, New Mexico, Colorado and Nevada giving the band their first taste of life on the road. Soon afterwards drummer Mike Crisis was asked to leave the band and they were once again without a drummer and still without a lead singer. As luck would have it by early May 2007 they had played an acoustic show in Ridgecrest, California, with Brandon Ball as their front man and soon afterwards, Michael Stahl of the band "Four Alarm Fire" was found and agreed to join the band. The first show with the new line-up was at the Bunkhouse Saloon in Las Vegas on May 28, 2007. Once again Eudora earned a spot on the 2007 Pomona Vans Warped Tour date playing on the Ernie Ball Stage.

=== The Silent Years ===
While playing a number of shows in the Southland the band began work writing what would be their first full-length CD The Silent Years. Not being signed to a label the entire recording process had to be financed by the band themselves by playing shows and selling merchandise whenever possible. The album The Silent Years was recorded between November 17, 2007, and April 27, 2008, at Black Studios in Los Angeles and WoodWorks Studios in Hollywood. Produced and co-mixed by Brent Woods. Soon after production on the CD was complete Michael Stahl announced that he was marrying the love of his life and would be leaving the band. Good friend and drummer, Justin McCarthy of the band Lunar Fiction agreed help out and play a number of live dates with the band. The band was featured on a KOCE-TV story about the Orange County music scene that appeared on the PBS show InsideOC on KOCE-TV. The May 11, 2008, release of The Silent Years was celebrated with a CD release show at Chain Reaction in Anaheim on May 10. Justin was soon recruited and wooed away to join Epitaph Records signed band "I Am Ghost" This time they didn't have to look too far for a new drummer, long-time friend Nick Derosa drummed for the band for a few months before officially being declared "In the band". Alternative Press magazine picked Eudora in their August 2008 Warped Tour issue as one of the Top 8 unsigned bands that you should know about. With the new lineup in place the band was picked to play the on last five dates of the 2008 Vans Warped Tour on the Kevin Says Stage. Robby Friend was unable to play the first date in Fresno so Tony Kim of Lunar Fiction filled in on that date only.

=== Lifted and Gifted ===
In September 2008 the band left for tour on the road with Flight 409 and We Spell Disaster. Dubbed "The Lifted and Gifted Tour", The tour proved to be more a drudgery then a pleasure and only served to aggravated ongoing tensions already brewing in the band. The three-week tour passed through several locations in California, Nevada, Colorado, Utah, Arizona, and New Mexico. The band ended the tour in Las Vegas, and wasted no time rushing home. The band took a long break returning for one more headlining show (in December) at Chain Reaction in Anaheim after which, Robby Friend left to join the band Frequency Five.

=== Present day ===
Preliminary writing had begun on what would have been Eudora's third CD. Powerslave Records has signed Eudora in May 2009 with plans to release "The Silent Years" on July 8, 2009, in Japan with a bonus track included. A music video for the song "Digging Up The Dead with John Edwards" has been shot and will be released shortly. It was announced in early June, that Eudora won a slot on the Ernie Ball Stage at the Pomona date of the 2009 Vans Warped Tour. Kevin Connor left Eudora to pursue a career in the freight industry, Tim Markel sang for the Metal band Beneath Paris, and continues to write music for his Solo Project, Nick has joined the Orange County-based band The Derty and Brandon Ball and Tony Kim have begun writing and recording their first record together. Their new project is titled "Strangers At Dawn". Eudora have officially broken-up with no plans to record or perform together again. Tim Markel, and Robby Friend have begun writing and recording for a new project called "Hideouts" and expect to have a full-length available online by summer 2012.

== Discography ==
- And it Rained Machines (World Artist Records, 2006)
- The Nutcase Demos ( Unreleased, 2006)
- The Silent Years ( Powerslave Records, 2009)
- Live @ Di Piazzas ( Rare live set (Pre "The Silent Years" release, 2007)
