= Dora Justiniano de la Rocha =

Bolivian linguist, educator and poet (1925–2016)

Dora Justiniano Callaú de la Rocha (1925 – 23 April 2016) was a Bolivian educator, linguist, and poet.

== Biography ==
=== Early life ===
Justiniano was born in 1925 in Trinidad, capital of the Bolivian department of the Beni.

=== Education and career ===
Justiniano trained as a teacher at the National School of Teachers in Sucre, graduating in 1946. She moved shortly thereafter to La Paz, the city in which she was to spend most of her professional career. She undertook postgraduate studies in Mexico.

In the late 1970s, in La Paz, Justiniano attended a seminar on linguistics led by Martha James Hardman, a researcher specializing in Andean languages. The seminar stoked her interest in language contact phenomena, leading her to conduct her own research into the effects on Bolivian Spanish of contact with regional varieties of indigenous languages such as Quechua and Aymara.

In 1975, she served as the national head of Accelerated Basic Education for Bolivia.

From 1981 onward, Justiniano was an active member of the Asociación de Lingüística y Filología de la América Latina (ALFAL), serving at times as the organization's regional delegate for Bolivia and for Ecuador. As a poet, she was also a member of the Confederación Perú-Boliviana de Poetas y Escritores, the Sociedad Boliviana de Escritores (SOBODE), and the Círculo Femenino de Cultura Hispana.

Justiniano died on 23 April 2016, in La Paz, Bolivia.

== Selected published works ==
=== Poetry collections ===
- Poemas escolares (1961)
- La coca (1995)
- Mi poemario de lectura (1995)
- Homenaje a Federico García Lorca (1998)
- Sentimientos: Poemas (2002)

=== Linguistics publications ===
- Apuntes sobre las lenguas nativas en el dialecto español de Bolivia (monograph, 1984)
- "Vocabulario vernacular en la literatura boliviana" (article, 1986)
- "Apuntes semánticos en el español de Bolivia bajo la influencia de lenguas vernáculas" (article, 1988)
- "La lengua española y las lenguas vernáculares de Bolivia" (article, 1991)

== Recognitions ==
In 1991, Justiniano was granted the Gran Orden de la Educación Boliviana, a national award, for her contributions to children's education. For her writing, she was also a recipient of the “Chachapuma de oro” and “Medalla de mérito cultural” awards, among others.
