= Dora Werzberg =

French nurse (1920–2020)

- Born: 5 September 1920; Strasbourg, France
- Died: 1 April 2020 (aged 99); Paris, France
- Occupation(s): Nurse, social worker

Dora Werzberg Amelan (5 September 1920 – 1 April 2020) was a French nurse and social worker. In 1942, she rescued Jewish children through Œuvre de secours aux enfants (OSE). She worked in the Camp de Rivesaltes and the Gurs internment camp, and took care of children who had survived the Nazi concentration camps. She died during the COVID-19 pandemic due to complications brought on by COVID-19.

== Biography ==
Werzberg was born in Strasbourg, the daughter of Karl Werzberg and Gisèla Blum, who were Jewish emigrants from Poland. The family moved to Antwerp when Werzberg was ten, and stayed until the death of her mother and the invasion of Belgium by Nazi Germany. She then joined a Zionist youth movement.

Werzberg had two sisters, Manda, who died of sepsis in 1942, and Simone Ben David, who died in Israel at age 86. Her cousins included Georges Loinger and Marcel Marceau. Werzberg went to the German Kommandantur to obtain papers to flee to the south of France. Her father was unable to obtain the papers, but fled to the Zone libre illegally. There, the Werzbergs settled in Limoges, where her extended family was located.

Werzberg worked for the OSE, the Camp de Rivesaltes, and, lastly, the Gurs internment camp until its closure in November 1943.

== Distinction ==
- Knight of the Legion of Honour (2016)
