= Dora Kim Moon =

Korean-American activist (1877–1971)

- Hangul: 문도라; 문또라
- RR: Mun Dora; Mun Ttora
- MR: Mun Tora; Mun Ttora

Dora Kim Moon (Korean: 문도라 or 문또라; August 8, 1876 – February 6, 1971) was a Korean-American community organizer and Korean independence activist. In March 2017, Hawaiʻi Magazine ranked her among a list of the most influential women in Hawaiian history.

After emigrating from Korea to the Territory of Hawaii, she formed a prayer group which later became the First Korean United Methodist Church. Also in Hawaii, Moon founded the Korean Women's Club, the Korean Missionary Society, and helped establish the Korean Women's Relief Society. According to the Hawai'i Council for the Humanities, she was a "pivotal organizer of a modern Korean women's movement in the Territory of Hawai‘i".
