= Dora Talamante Lemas =

Mexican politician (born 1965)

- Born: 7 January 1965 (age 61); Caborca, Sonora, Mexico
- Occupation: Deputy
- Political party: PANAL

Dora María Guadalupe Talamante Lemas (born 7 January 1965) is a Mexican politician affiliated with the PANAL. As of 2013, she served as Deputy of the LXII Legislature of the Mexican Congress representing Sonora.
