= Dora Finch =

British matron (1877–1943)

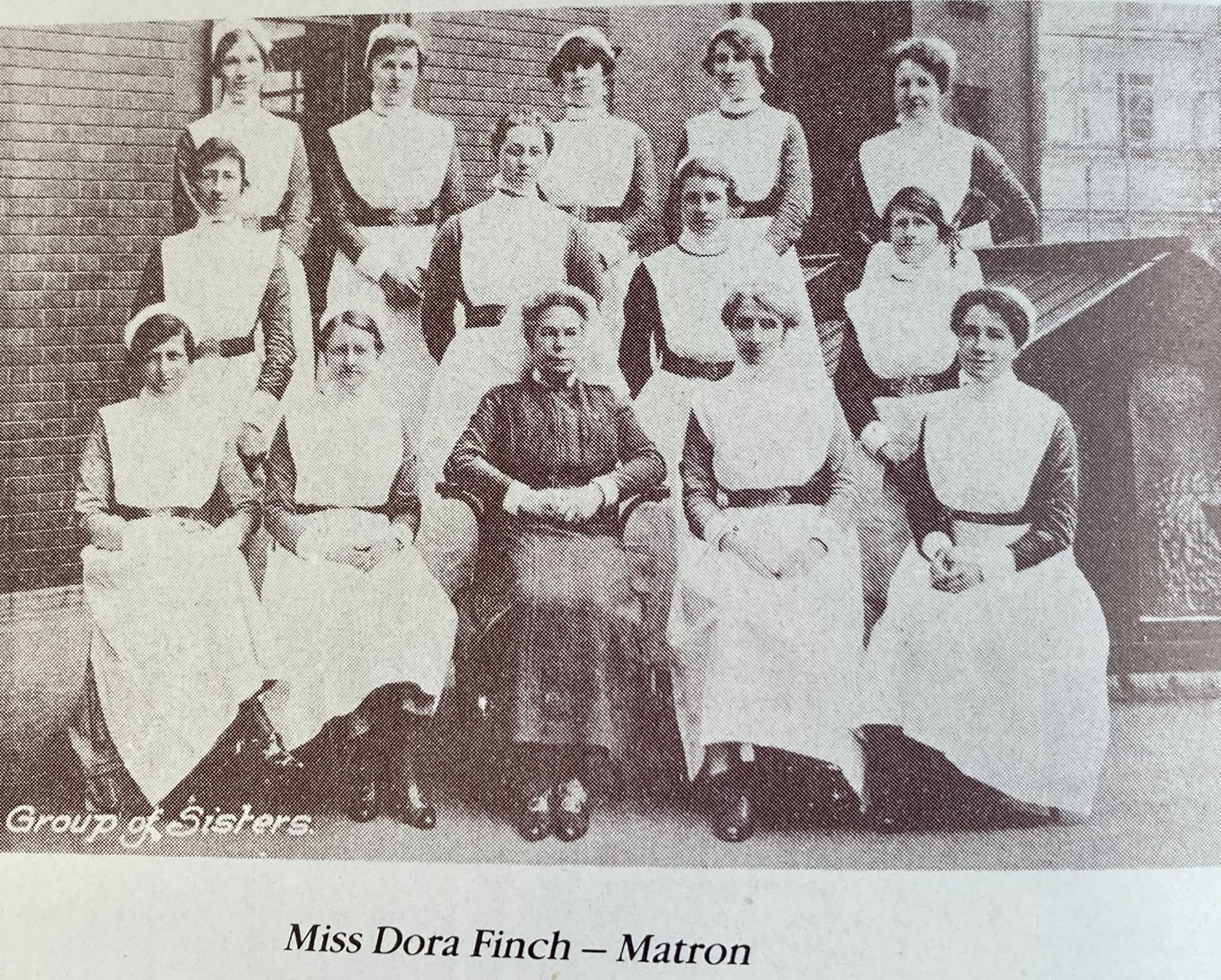
- Born: 1877; Blackheath, Kent, United Kingdom
- Died: 1943 (aged 65–66)
- Occupations: British Nurse and Matron
- Honours: Royal Red Cross

Dora Finch, RRC, (1877–1943) was a British nurse. She served as matron of the central London teaching hospital University College Hospital for 21 years and was prominent in the development of the nursing profession in the UK.

== Early life and nursing career ==
Finch was born in Blackheath, Kent to Louisa and Robert Finch (a general practitioner); she was one of seven children.

Finch trained as a nurse first at St Helen's Cottage Hospital, Merseyside (1888-1886) and then at St. Bartholomew's Hospital, London (1888–91) under the matronship of Isla Stewart. She joined the British Nursing Association (founded by Mrs Bedford Fenwick) registering on their roll of nurses as number 331 in 1890. Her first appointment was as night superintendent, the Metropolitan Free Hospital, Kingsland Road before returning to St. Bartholomew's Hospital as sister of St. Luke's Ward. She was known as a much loved sister and a member of the St. Bartholomew's Hospital League of Nurses.

== Later nursing career and activities in national nursing organizations ==
In 1899 Finch took up the position of matron of the New Hospital for Women, Euston Road (later the Elizabeth Garrett Anderson & obstetric Hospital) and was elected a member of the Matron's Council for Great Britain and Ireland, an organization committed to the training and registration of nurses.

In 1901 she was appointed matron of University College Hospital (UCH) where she remained until her retirement in 1922. During this period she strengthened the model of training for nurses such that she was credited with attracting the attention of the Rockefeller Foundation to UCH. She inaugurated a League of Nurses in 1909, which continues as a UCH nurses charity

In 1916 she was among the first to register her nursing qualification with the College of Nursing Ltd (later the Royal College of Nursing). This register was subsequently built on by the new General Nursing Council after the Nurses Registration Act in 1919. During World War 1 she was appointed Principal Matron of the London General Hospital Territorial Forces Nursing Service and in 1917 awarded the Royal Red Cross for her contribution to civilian nursing.

Following her retirement from UCH, Finch was appointed secretary to the registrar of the new General Nursing Council but did not take up the position following controversy and claims of nepotism.

She died in UCH on February 4, 1943. Following a requiem mass at St. Mary Magdalene, Munster Square, NW1 she was cremated at Golder's Green.

== Honors and awards ==
In 1917 Finch was awarded the Royal Red Cross for her contribution to civilian nursing.
