= Dora Louise Murdoch =

American artist

- Born: 1857; New Haven, Connecticut
- Died: 1933 (aged 75–76); Baltimore, Maryland
- Known for: Painting

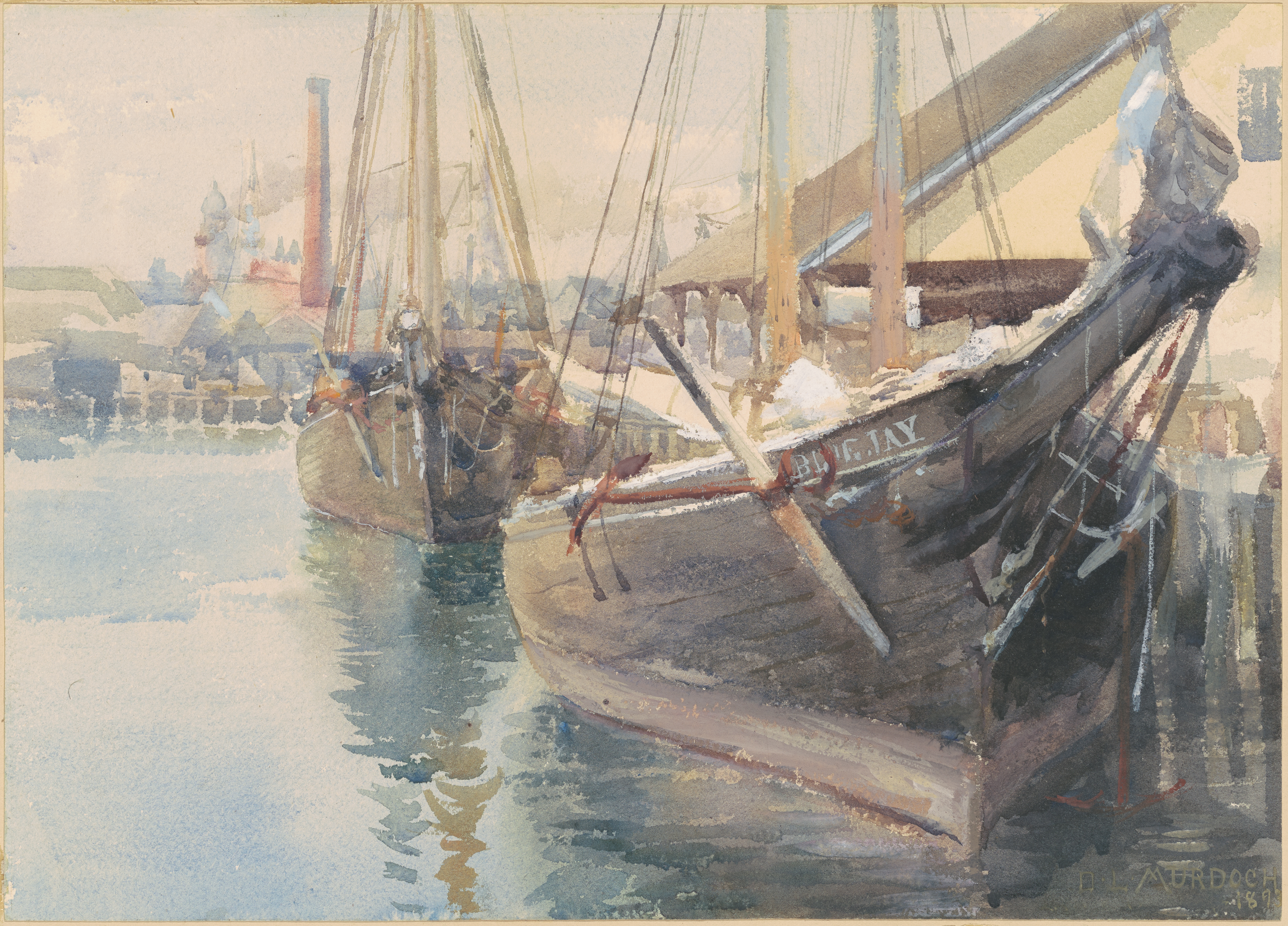
Ships at the Dock, 1893

Dora Louise Murdoch (1857-1933) was an American painter.

== Biography ==
Murdoch was born on September 14, 1857, in New Haven, Connecticut. She studied in Paris, France where her teachers included, Bernard Boutet de Monvel, Gustave-Claude-Etienne Courtois, and Lucien Simon.

She was a member of the American Federation of Arts, the American Watercolor Society, the Baltimore Watercolor Society, the New York Watercolor Society, and the Washington DC Watercolor Society. Her work was exhibited at the 1904 St. Louis World's Fair.

Murdoch died in 1933 in Baltimore, Maryland. Her work is in the collection of the National Gallery of Art.
