= Dora Taylor =

South African woman writer and propagandist

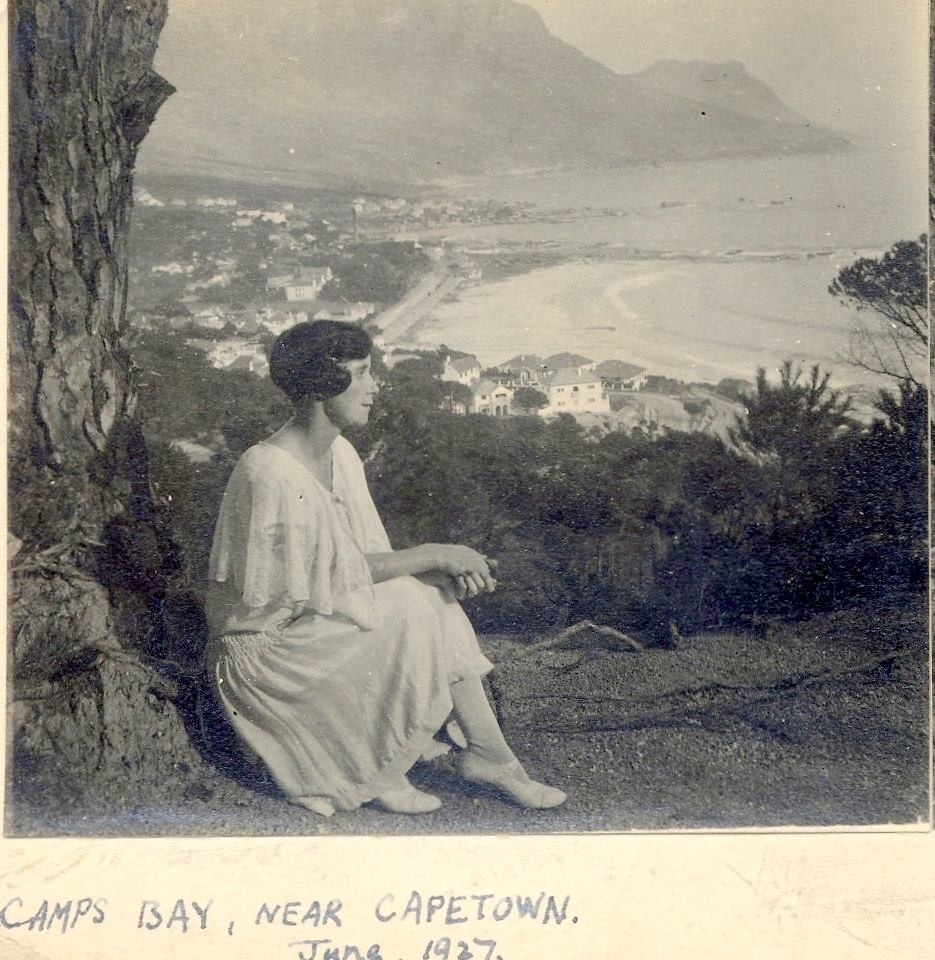
Dora Taylor in 1927

Dora Taylor (1899-1976) was a Scottish writer and professor of Literature who lived in South Africa from 1926 until 1963 and who became involved in Marxism–Leninist groups in the 1930s as part of the African national independence movements.

As part of her work for agitation she work a number of important pamphlets, reviews, and books, the most famous of which turned out to be 'The Role of Missionaries in Conquest', (written under the pen name Nosipho Majeke, meaning "gift of Jack" in isiXhosa), where she chronicled the strict collaboration and synergy that was in place between Western missionary efforts and the extractivist goals of colonialism. She also wrote novels and short stories.

She is famous for having penned the well-known line, often falsely attributed to Desmond Tutu, that "When the white man arrived, he had the Bible and we had the land; now, we have the Bible and he has the land."

After being forced to flee to the United Kingdom in the 1960s, she died in London in 1976.

== Bibliography ==
- Kathie. 1951
- The Role of the Missionaries in Conquest. 1952
- A Life’s Mosaic (Autobiography)
- Rage of Life
- Don’t Tread on my Dreams (Short stories)
- An African Tragedy: The Black Woman Under Apartheid. 1976
