= Dora E. Angelaki =

Neuroscientist

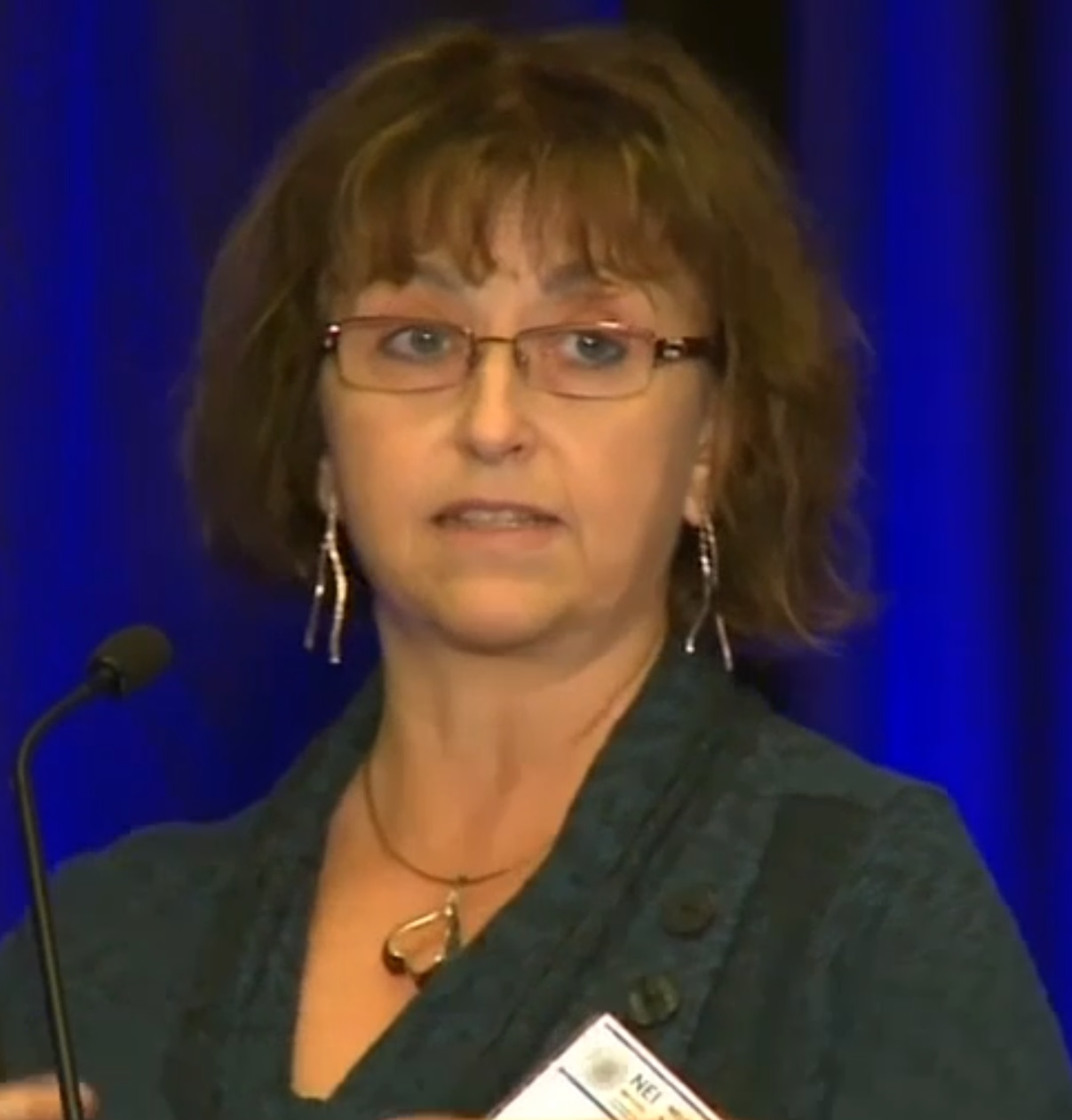
- Angelaki speaks at the National Eye Institute 50th Symposium on Vision and the Brain in 2017
- Born: Crete, Greece
- Education: National Technical University of Athens (BS); University of Minnesota (MS, PhD)
- Awards: National Academy of Sciences Pradal Award ('13)
- Scientific career
- Workplaces: University of Mississippi; Washington University; Rice University; Baylor College of Medicine; New York University
- Thesis: Spatio-temporal convergence in the otolith vestibular system (1991)

Dora Angelaki is a Professor of Neuroscience in the New York University Tandon School of Engineering. She previously held the Wilhelmina Robertson Professorship of Neuroscience at the Baylor College of Medicine. She looks at multi-sensory information flow between subcortical and cortical areas of the brain. Her research interests include spatial navigation and decision-making circuits. She was elected to the National Academy of Sciences in 2014.

== Early life and education ==
Angelaki grew up in Crete. She studied electrical engineering at the National Technical University of Athens. During her undergraduate studies Angelaki became interested in biomedical engineering, and started to read biology papers alongside her degree. She moved to the University of Minnesota for her graduate studies and earned her PhD in biomedical engineering in 1991. Here she worked on fluid-filled passages in the inner ear, known as the vestibular system, which controls our spatial orientation and maintains our posture. Angelaki was made a postdoctoral fellow at the University of Texas Medical Branch. She completed another postdoctoral fellowship at the University of Zurich, where she worked with Volker Henn and Bernhard Hess. At Zurich Angelaki studied otolith afferents.

== Research and career ==
Angelaki was made an assistant professor at the University of Mississippi in 1993. She has investigated the sensory structures of the vestibular system. While at Mississippi Angelaki was awarded a grant to study the three-dimensional organisation of the oculomotor nerve. She moved to the School of Engineering & Applied Science (McKelvey School of Engineering) at Washington University in St. Louis in 1999, where she was made an in Endowed Chair of Neurobiology 2003. In 2011 Angelaki was made the Wilhelmina Robertson Professor and Chair in the Department of Neuroscience at the Baylor College of Medicine. She holds a joint position at Rice University.

She investigates the communication between cells in the brain. She was awarded the Presidential Early Career Award for Scientists and Engineers in 1996. She studies computational, cognitive and systems neurosciences. She is interested in spatial orientation and navigation in humans and primates. She combines behavioural analysis with multi-electrode recording, laminar probes and microsimulation. Angelaki looks at how cognitive behaviour is produced in neuronal populations. She identified how the brain integrates information from the rotation and linear movement of the head with its response to gravity. Angelaki has investigated the changes in neural computation in people with autism. She showed that people with autism often have imbalances in the balance of neural excitation to neural inhibition, known as divisive normalisation. In 2013 Angelaki was made editor-in-chief of The Journal of Neuroscience.

Angelaki joined the New York University Tandon School of Engineering where she investigates the differences between human brains and artificial intelligence.

== Awards and honours ==
- 1992 National Institutes of Health Postdoctoral Fellowship
- 1996 Presidential Early Career Award for Scientists and Engineers
- 2006 The Bárány Society Helpike-Nylen Medal
- 2011 Society for Neuroscience Grass Lectures
- 2012 National Academy of Sciences Pradel Award
- 2014 Elected to the National Academy of Sciences

== Personal life ==
Angelaki is married to J. David Dickman, a neurobiologist at the Baylor College of Medicine. They have two daughters.
