= Germán Bringas =

Mexican multi-instrumentalist, composer, producer and performer

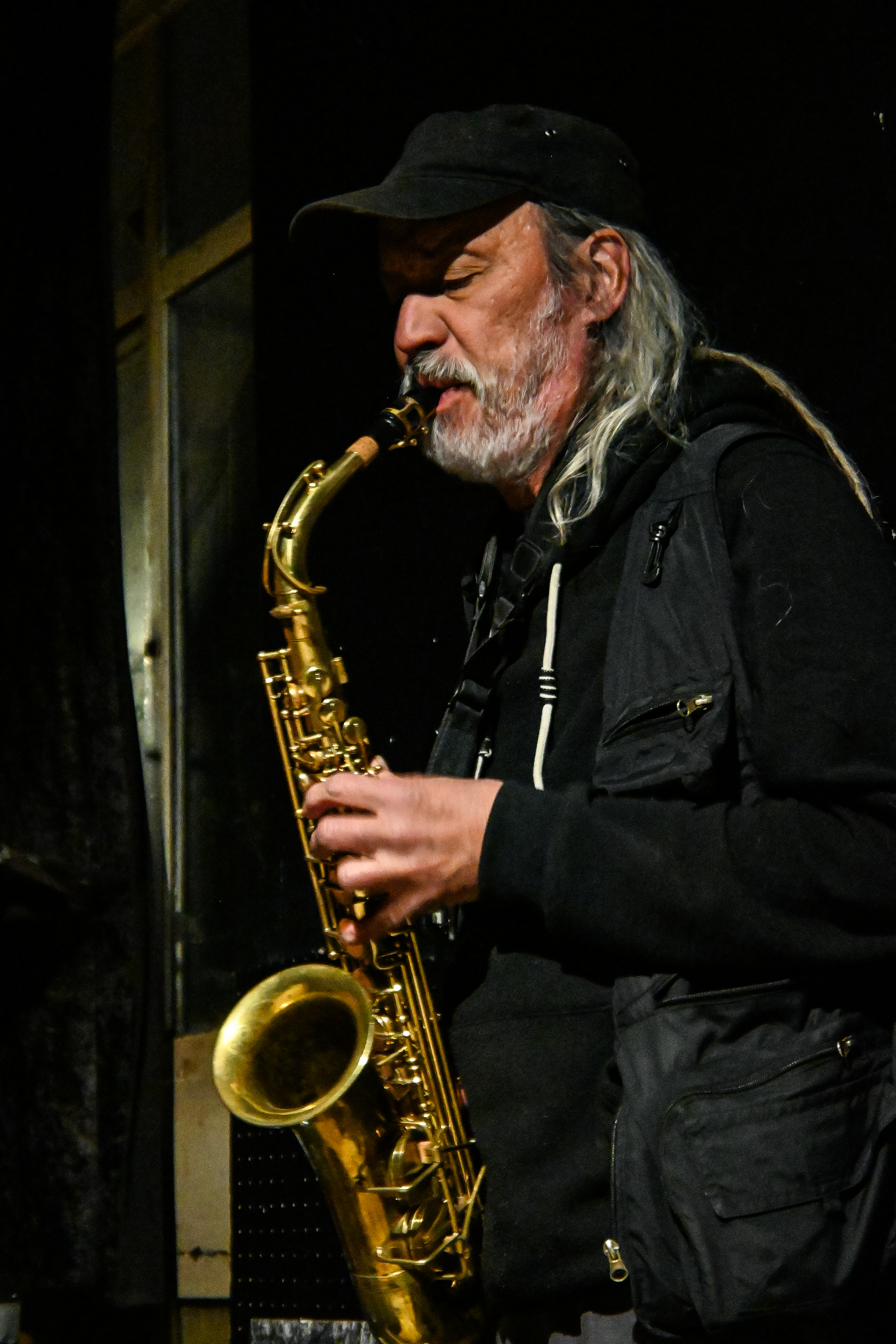
- Occupations: Multi-instrumentalist, composer, producer and performer

Germán Bringas (Mexico City, 1965) is a Mexican free jazz, improvisation and extended techniques multi-instrumentalist, composer, producer and performer.

== Bio ==
Germán Bringas began studying classical piano at the age of 7, which he continued for 7 more years. Bringas has a type of synesthesia, which allows him to relate and perceive colors among with sounds. At the age of 16 he met Carlos Castaneda, who influenced him, especially on the subject and study of perception. At the age of 23, motivated by taking distance from classical jazz and bebop, he began to explore free jazz, improvisation, sound experimentation and extended techniques, influenced by authors such as John Zorn and Fred Frith, at which time he moved to a country house outside Mexico City, the birthplace of his sons Sim Bringas and Iván Bringas, also musicians.

In 1991, he founded Jazzorca Récords, a record label made aiming to self-producing his recordings; in 1995 the project expanded to the opening of Jazzorca café, a musical venue in the Portales neighborhood pioneering devoted to the weekly presentation of genres different from classical jazz Mexico City venues such as free jazz, improvisation and sound experimentation. Bringas composes and produces music both individually and in ensembles of diverse conformation (Zero Point), including orchestral projects (La Orkezta de los 13 Zalbajes). In 2003, in the context of the Radar Mexico festival, Bringas was selected by John Zorn to perform and conduct with a 14-piece orchestra his Cobra. Bringas has collaborated and performed with musicians such as Scott Forrey, Fred Frith, Chris Cutler, John Zorn, Tatsuya Yoshida, Shelley Hirsch, Hans Tammen, Ursel Schlicht, Morio, Kathrin Lemke, Robert Michler, among others. He is also a musical instrument manufacturer such steel tongue drums.

== Works ==
- Caminatas (Jazzorca Récords, 1990)
- Piano Solos ( Jazzorca Récords, 1990)
- Nuevos Rasgos (Jazzorca Récords, 1990)
- Improvisaciones En N.Y. (Jazzorca Récords, 1994)
- Ser doble (Jazzorca Récords, 1994)
- El salto (Jazzorca Récords, 1996)
- La triste maquina de hacer arroz (Jazzorca-Option Sonica, 1997)
- Tank tromp (Jazzorca Récords, 2011)
- Túnel hacia ti (Smile C, 2021)

=== Collaborations ===
- Le nut le (Jazzorca Records, Smogless Records, 1998) with Sergio Bustamante
- Las calles de plata de la Portales (Sony Music, 1998) with Alejandra Arellano and Rodrigo Castelán
- Germán Bringas y el Engrane Amarillo (Jazzorca Records, Smogless Records, 1999) with Fred Frith and Chris Cutler
- Zona de desfragmentación I and II (two boxes of 7 discs, 2005-2008)
- Ensamble Libre de Ritmos Africanos (Jazzorca, 2011)
