= University of Yaoundé I =

Public university in Cameroon

- Université de Yaoundé I
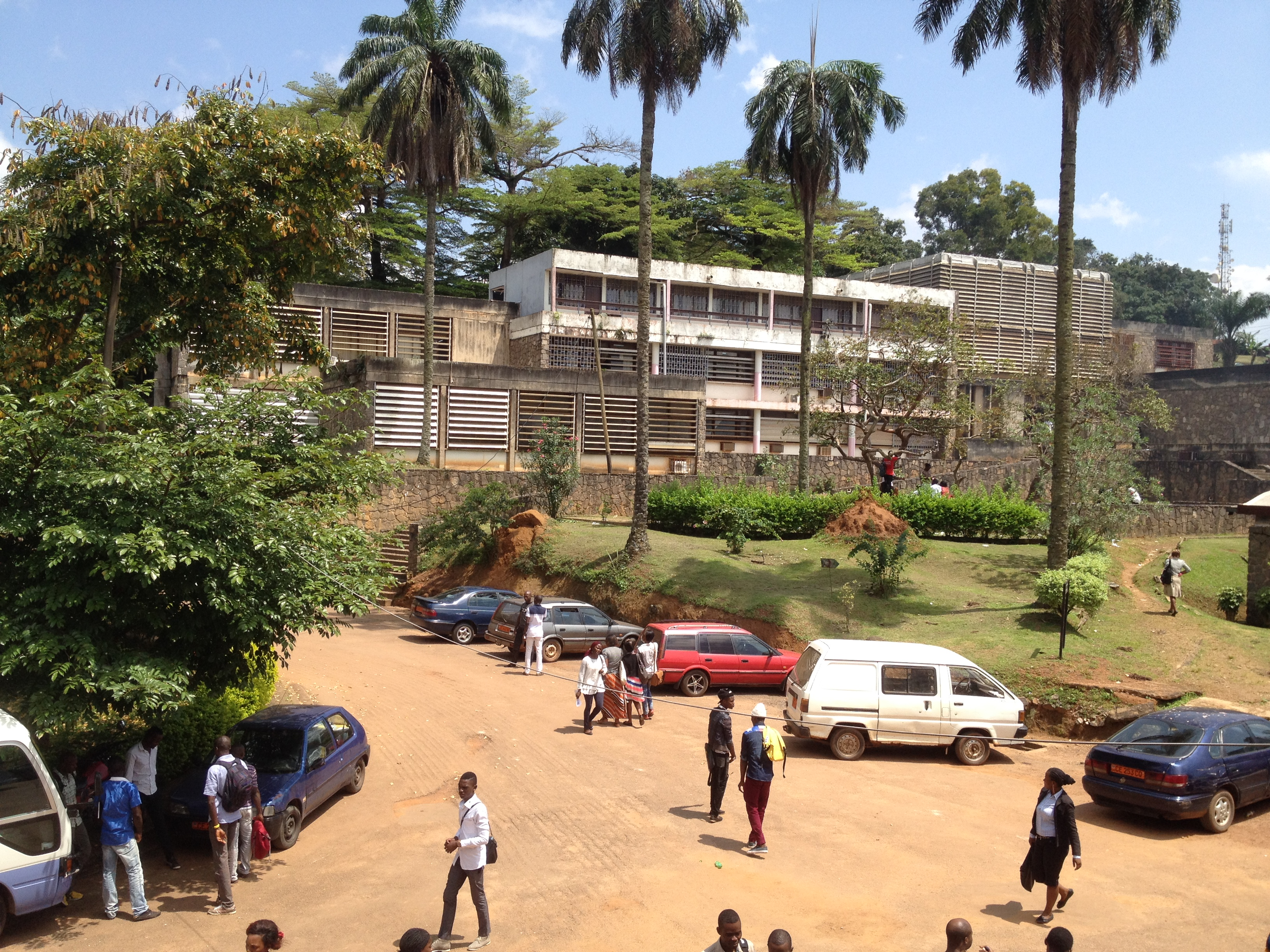
- The campus of University of Yaoundé I in Ngoa-Ekelle
- Motto: Sapientia - collativa - cognitio
- Type: Public
- Established: 1993; 33 years ago
- Rector: Maurice Aurélien Sosso
- Location: Yaounde, Centre, Cameroon; 3.8570°N 11.5013°E
- Campus: Ngoa-Ekelle (main campus)
- Language: French, English
- Website: www.uy1.uninet.cm

The University of Yaoundé I (UYI; French: Université de Yaoundé I) is a public university in Cameroon, located in the capital Yaoundé. It was formed in 1993 following a university reform that split the country's oldest university, the University of Yaoundé, into two separate entities: the University of Yaoundé I and the University of Yaoundé II.

== Faculties ==
The University of Yaounde I consists of:

- the Faculty of Arts, Humanities and Social Sciences (Faculté des Arts, Lettres et Sciences Humaines, short FALSH)
- the Faculty of Sciences (Faculté des Sciences, short FS)
- the Faculty of Medicine and Biomedical Sciences (Faculté de Médecine et de Sciences Biomédicales, short FMSB).
- The higher teacher's Training College of Yaounde HTTC
- The National Advanced School of Engineering
- The Higher Teacher's Training Technical School of Ebolowa.

The main university complex is Ngoa-Ekelle with several satellite campuses elsewhere.
