= Dora Musielak =

Mathematician & physicist

Dora Elia Musielak is an aerospace engineer, historian of mathematics, and book author. She is an expert on high-speed airbreathing jet engines, and an adjunct professor of mechanical and aerospace engineering at the University of Texas at Arlington.

== Education and career ==
Musielak earned a bachelor's degree in aeronautical engineering from the Instituto Politécnico Nacional in Mexico in 1978, the first woman to earn a degree in this field there. She continued with a master's degree at the University of Tennessee in 1980, and a Ph.D. at the University of Alabama in Huntsville in 1994.

Her employers have included Northrop Grumman, MSE Technology Applications, and ATK Allied Techsystems. She chaired the High Speed Air Breathing Propulsion Technical Committee of the American Institute of Aeronautics and Astronautics from 2014 to 2016.

== Books ==
Musielak's 2004 self-published historical novel Sophie's Diary: A Mathematical Novel, based on the life of mathematician Sophie Germain, was republished in a second edition in 2012 by the Mathematical Association of America. Musielak also wrote a biography of Germain, Prime Mystery: The Life and Mathematics of Sophie Germain (2015), also republished in an expanded second edition as Sophie Germain: Revolutionary Mathematician by Springer in 2020.

Her other books include Kuxan Suum: Path to the Center of the Universe (2010) and Euler Celestial Analysis: Introduction to Spacecraft Orbit Mechanics (2018). These remain self-published, through AuthorHouse.
