= Remi Álvarez =

Jazz saxophonist from Mexico

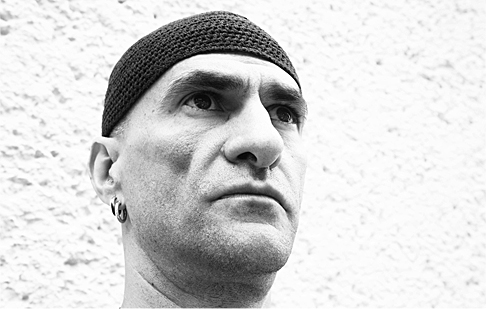
Remi Álvarez

Remi Álvarez (born in Mexico City, Mexico) is a Mexican jazz saxophonist. He studied transversal flute at the Conservatorio Nacional de Música from 1975 to 1979 with Rubén Islas.

== Biography ==
He then taught himself to play the saxophone and made his professional debut with Cuarteto Mexicano de Jazz in 1984. Later, he moved to New York City and continued his studies of composition and improvisation at the Creative Music Studio with Anthony Braxton, George Lewis, Roscoe Mitchell and Don Cherry. He studied a bachelor in jazz at the Escuela Superior de Música from 1982 to 1987. In 1988, he traveled to Paris where his musical development was strengthened by taking classes with the composer-sax player Steve Lacy.

Since 1991, he has been a professor of saxophone and jazz at the Escuela Nacional de Música of the Universidad Autónoma de México (UNAM).

In February 2004, he traveled to Europe, invited by Georg Hoffman, Swiss bass player, and Tobias Delius, British saxophonist, touring several cities in Switzerland and the Netherlands with them.

In 2005, he took a course in advanced improvisation at the Vancouver Creative Music Institute with George Lewis and Evan Parker, among others.

In June 2006, he was invited to play in the Vision Festival, the most important free jazz festival in New York City by Dennis González, Texan trumpet player.

Founder of Cráneo de Jade, with whom he has co-produced and recorded three CDs, he was invited to the Festival Internacional de Jazz Plaza in La Habana, Cuba, in 1997. In October 2005, Cráneo de Jade performed at the Palacio de Bellas Artes as a part of the Los Diez Grandes del Jazz, a tribute to the pioneers of jazz in México. In April 2007, Cráneo de Jade attended the VII Festival Internacional de San Luis Potosí.

He has been a member of Astillero ensemble since 2000, performing in France in 2001 and 2004. In October 2006, Astillero joined the 34th edition of the Festival Internacional Cervantino.

Currently, he is a member of Antimateria, FAS Trio, Cráneo de Jade ensembles; he plays in a duet with Gabriel Lauber and runs his own trio: Remi Álvarez Trio. He has performed live with musicians like Sabir Mateen, Rodrigo Amado, Dennis, Stefan and Aaron González, Ernest Dawkins, Vinz Vonlanthen, Michael Vatcher, Tayeb Laoufi and the Gnawa Spirit from Morocco. He has performed live and recorded with the Camerata de las Américas.

== Selected ensembles ==
- Chocolate Smoke Gang
- Álvarez - Lauber Duo
- Antimateria
- Cráneo de Jade
- FAS Trio
- Remi Álvarez Trio

== Major collaborators ==
- Carlos Maldonado Cisneros
- Milo Tamez
- Aarón Cruz
- Gabriel Lauber
- Hernan Hecht
- Itzam Cano
- Gustavo Nandayapa
- Arturo Báez
- Jorge Fernández
- David Sánchez
