= Eudora (given name) =

Female given name

Eudora is a feminine given name derived from the Greek word elements eu, meaning "good" and dōron, meaning "gift". It is written in Ancient Greek as Εὐδώρη. Eudora is a name used for three nymphs in Greek mythology. Variants in use include Eudoria and Udora.

== Women ==
- L. Eudora Ashburne (c. 1887–1992), American physician
- Eudora Bumstead (1860–1892), American poet and hymnwriter
- L. Eudora Pettigrew (1928–2021), American educator
- Eudora Quartey-Koranteng (died 2021), Ghanaian diplomat
- Eudora Ramsay Richardson (1891–1973), American women's rights activist, public servant and author
- Eudora Hull Spalding (1867–1942), American philanthropist
- Eudora Welty (1909–2001), American short-story writer, novelist and photographer
