= Dora Duby =

American dancer (1901–1998)

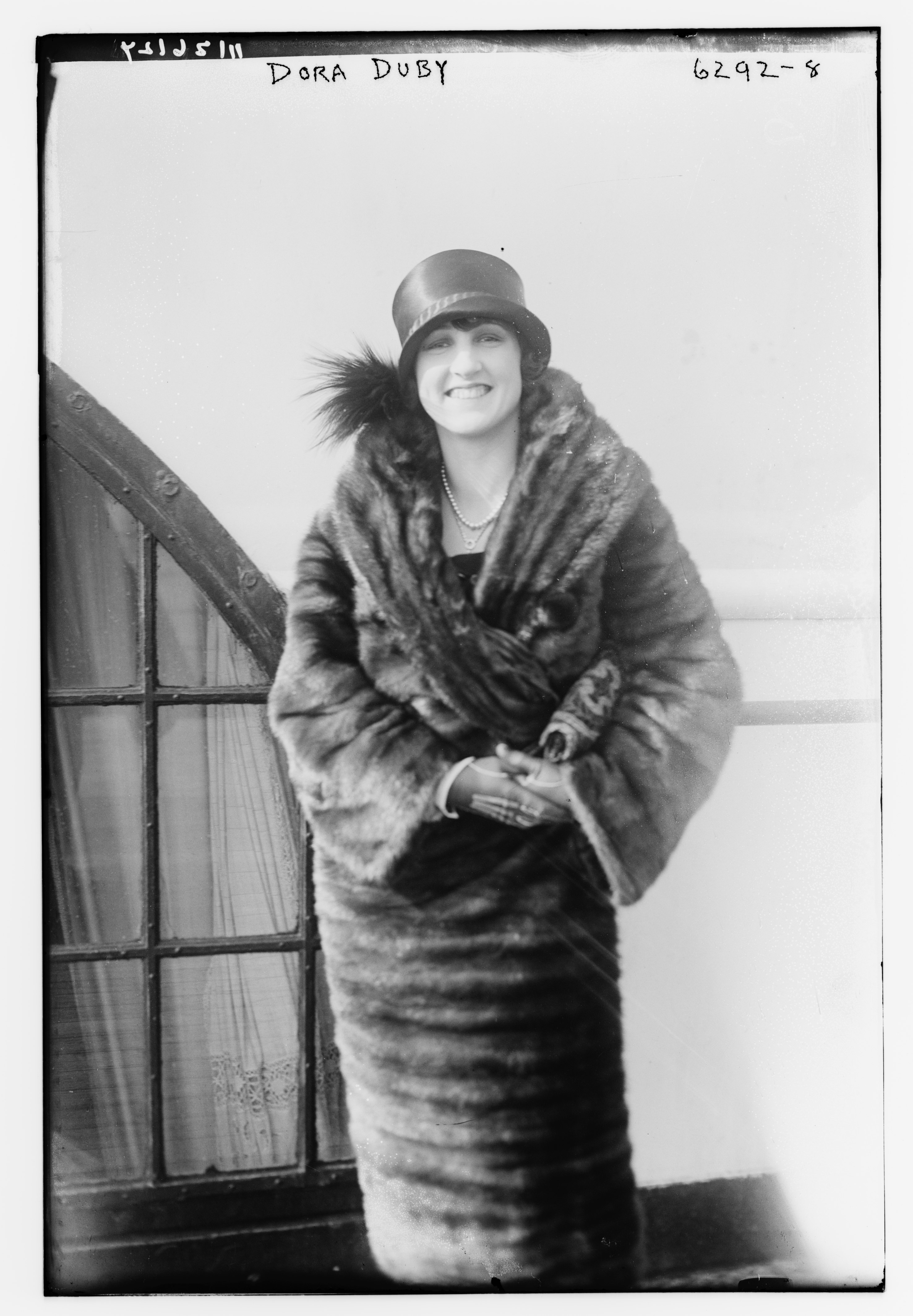
- Duby, photographed for the Bain News Service in the 1910s
- Born: Stephania Dubcich; October 9, 1901; Seattle, Washington
- Died: April 12, 1998 (aged 96)
- Other names: Stephanie Duby
- Occupation: Dancer

Dora Duby (October 9, 1901 – April 12, 1998), born Stephania Dubcich, was an American dancer on Broadway, in London, and in Paris in the 1920s and 1930s.

== Early life and education ==
Stephania Dubcich was born in Seattle (though some sources give Spokane or San Francisco as her birthplace), the daughter of Stephen Dubcich (Duby) and Augusta D. Fraude Stevens. Her mother was born in Germany, and her father was born in Austria. She trained as a dancer with Luigi Albertieri. In mid-career, she also trained with Mary Wigman in Berlin.

== Career ==
Duby danced in San Francisco, and with Anna Pavlova's company, as a young woman. Her Broadway credits included roles in The Lady in Red (1919), Linger Longer Letty (1919–1920), The Midnight Rounders of 1921, and Bombo (1921). In London, she danced in music halls, and appeared in The Whirl of the World (1924) and Dolly's Revels (1924). In Paris she danced in cabarets at Club Daunou, Acacias, Ciro's, the Casino de Paris, and Le Perroquet in the mid-1920s, including a stint as dance partner of Maurice Chevalier. In Europe she also danced in Venice, Vienna, Deauville, Biarritz, Monaco, Cannes, and Aix le Bains, and she toured in China, India, and South America.

Duby also modeled gowns for Vogue, and displayed her jewelry in The Sketch. Her dresses were described in detail in press reports in the 1920s and 1930s. In 1935, she was hired by the Mexican government to direct the Escuela Nacional de Danza in Mexico City.

== Personal life ==
Duby sued millionaire Harold Grier in 1923, saying that he promised then failed to marry her. In 1924, she was rumored to have many wealthy suitors in Paris and Venice, including Ahmad Mirza. Her partner Ernest Van Duren died by suicide in 1930. She died in 1998, at the age of 96.
