= Dora Barilla =

American health care strategist (born 1969)

- Born: 1969 (age 56–57); Pasadena, California
- Occupations: President, Co-Founder HC2 Strategies Inc
- Years active: 28
- Known for: Conceptualizing innovative models of health care
- Notable work: Developing local, regional health communities models
- Family: Tom Barilla (husband), two daughters

Dora Barilla (born 1969) is a healthcare strategist, executive, educator and entrepreneur. She is president and co-founder of HC2 Strategies Inc, a transformational leadership and strategic planning firm based in Southern California. She also is founder and president of Partners for Better Health, serves as executive leader/community investments for Providence St. Joseph Health, is an assistant professor of health policy at Loma Linda University, and serves on the board of trustees at San Antonio Community Hospital.

== Biography ==
=== Early life and education ===
Barilla was born in 1969 in Pasadena, California, and grew up in South Pasadena. She is a fifth-generation Californian. In 1991, she received a bachelor of science in sports medicine from Pepperdine University, and in 2008 received her doctor of public health from Loma Linda University.

=== Career ===
Barilla has spent 28 years in the healthcare industry. In 2005, she founded Partners for Better Health (PBH), a not-for-profit organization which promotes community health initiatives. From 2006 to 2010, she served as director of the Masters in Public Health program at the Loma Linda University School of Public Health. From 2010-2015, she served as assistant vice president for strategy and innovation at Loma Linda University Health. She has served as an assistant professor in health policy and leadership at Loma Linda University Health since 2006 and now serves as a Senior Fellow for Loma Linda's Institute for Health Policy and Leadership.

=== HC2 ===
Barilla co-founded HC2 in May 2015 with Richard L. Rawson, former chief executive officer for Loma Linda University Medical Center in Murrieta. The firm works with hospitals, healthcare systems, public health agencies, businesses and community stakeholders in what Barilla has described as “the new paradigm” for hospitals and health care systems. This involves transforming conventional models of health delivery toward a more pre-emptive community-based approach.

=== Additional work ===
Barilla is a national speaker on using community based health strategies to improve the health and well-being of entire communities.

In 2010, she wrote a book, "A New Day, A True Story of Healing, Faith and Miracles," about her husband Tom's recovery from a traumatic brain injury while on duty as a firefighter in Upland, California.
