= Dora Nascimento =

Brazilian geographer and politician

Vice Governor of Amapá

Personal details
- Born: 21 October 1967 (age 58) Macapá, Brazil
- Spouse: Joel banha

Doralice Nascimento de Souza better known as Dora Nascimento is a Brazilian politician. She was Vice Governor of Amapá in Brazil. She is also a geographer.
