= Doreen (given name) =

Doreen (UK: /ˈdɔːriːn/ DOR-een, US: /dɔːˈriːn/ dor-EEN), also occasionally spelt Dorean or Dorine, is a feminine given name, usually found in English-speaking countries. It is a combination of Dora with the suffix -een, which is related to the -ín suffix used in Irish, usually signifying small size or as an endearment.

Dora is a variant of Dorothy / Dorothea, which derives from the Late Greek name Δωρόθεος (Dorotheos), which meant "gift of god" (from δῶρον/doron meaning "gift" and θεός/theos meaning "god". It is thus related to many other feminine given names, including Dorian, Dorinda, Theodora and Isidora. Theodore is the masculine equivalent. Diminutive forms include Dee, Dodie, Dolly, Dory, Dot, Dottie, and Dotty.

The first known use of Doreen may have been in Edna Lyall's 1894 novel Doreen: The Story of a Singer.

Doreen may refer to the following people:

== In arts, entertainment, and media ==
- Doreen Andoh, Ghanaian media personality
- Doreen Avio (born 1985), Ghanaian journalist
- Doreen Baingana, Ugandan short story writer and editor
- Doreen Blumhardt (1914–2009), New Zealand potter, ceramicist and arts educator
- Doreen Brownstone (1922–2022), Canadian actress
- Doreen Carwithen (1922–2003), British composer
- Doreen Chadwick (1918–2014), British pianist and theatre organist
- Doreen Chanter, British singer
- Doreen Cronin (born 1966), American children's author
- Doreen Davies (1928–2020), British radio producer
- Doreen Fernandez (1934–2002), Filipino writer
- Doreen Garner (born 1986), American sculptor and performance artist
- Doreen Gentzler (born 1957), American TV news anchor
- Doreen Gildroy, American poet
- Doreen Hall (1921–2025), Canadian violinist
- Doreen Hawkins (1919–2013), British actress
- Doreen Hume (1926–2022), Canadian soprano soloist
- Doreen Jacobi (born 1974), German actress and former model
- Doreen Jensen (1933–2009), Canadian artist
- Doreen Jones, Welsh casting director
- Doreen Keogh (1924–2017), Irish actress
- Doreen Ketchens (born 1966), American jazz clarinetist
- Doreen Lang (1915–1999), New Zealand-born American actress
- Doreen Lindsay, Canadian photographer
- Doreen Lorenzo (born 1957), American writer
- Doreen Mantle (1926–2023), South African-born English actress
- Doreen McKay (1914–1986), American actress
- Doreen Micallef (1949–2001), Maltese poet and playwright
- Doreen Mirembe (born 1987), Ugandan actress
- Doreen Montalvo (1963–2020), American actress
- Doreen Montgomery (1913–1992), British screenwriter
- Doreen St. Félix (born 1992), Haitian-American writer
- Doreen Shaffer, Jamaican singer
- Doreen Sloane (1934–1990), English television actress
- Doreen Taylor, American contemporary singer-songwriter and actress
- Doreen Tovey (1918–2008), English writer
- Doreen Tracey (1943–2018), performer on the original Mickey Mouse Club television show
- Doreen Valiente (1922–1999), English Wiccan author and poet
- Doreen Virtue (born 1958), American New Age author
- Doreen Waddell (1965–2002), British singer
- Doreen Warburton (1930–2017), Australian theatre director and actress
- Doreen Wells (born 1937), English ballet dancer

== In government and politics ==
- Doreen Allen (1879–1963), English militant suffragette
- Doreen Amule (born 1982), Ugandan politician
- Doreen Assaad, Canadian politician
- Doreen Braitling (1904–1979), pastoralist and heritage advocate of Central Australia
- Doreen Carter (born 1963), American politician from Georgia
- Doreen Chen (born 1949), Jamaican politician
- Doreen Chung (1932–2009), Guyanese politician
- Doreen Costa, American politician
- Doreen Dodick (born 1932), Canadian politician
- Doreen Eagles, Canadian politician
- Doreen Gallegos, American politician
- Doreen Gorsky (1912–2001), British Liberal Party politician, feminist and television producer and executive
- Doreen Hamilton (1951–2022), Canadian politician
- Doreen Hope, Marchioness of Linlithgow (1886–1965), British aristocrat and Vicereine of India
- Doreen Howard, American politician
- Doreen Wonda Johnson, American politician who served as a member of the New Mexico House of Representatives
- Doreen Knatchbull, Baroness Brabourne (1896–1979), Anglo-Irish aristocrat, socialite and victim of the Provisional IRA
- Doreen Lawrence (born 1952), British politician
- Doreen Massey, Baroness Massey of Darwen (1938–2024), Labour member of the British House of Lords
- Doreen Nxumalo (born 1949), South African politician
- Doreen Nyanjura (born 1989), Ugandan politician
- Doreen Patterson Reitsma (1927–2000), Canadian female navy veteran
- Doreen Sioka (born 1960), Namibian politician
- Doreen Spence, Canadian indigenous rights activist
- Doreen Steidle (born 1950 or 1951), Canadian diplomat
- Doreen Voigt (born 1984), German politician
- Doreen Wicks (1935–2004), Canadian nurse, humanitarian and Citizenship Judge
- Doreen Young Wickremasinghe (1907–2000), British leftist, Communist politician and Member of Parliament in Sri Lanka

== In sport ==
- Doreen Amata (born 1988), Nigerian athlete
- Doreen Awuah (born 1989), Ghanaian footballer
- Doreen Brennan, Irish camogie player
- Doreen Chemutai (born 1996), Ugandan long-distance runner
- Doreen Chesang (born 1990), Ugandan long-distance runner
- Doreen Cooper (1907–2003), English swimmer
- Doreen Denny (born 1941), British ice dancer
- Doreen Dredge (born 1931), Canadian athlete
- Doreen Elliott (1908–1966), British skier
- Doreen Evans (1916–1982), British racing driver
- Doreen Hankin, British lawn bowler
- Doreen Lumley (1921–1939), New Zealand sprinter
- Doreen McCannell-Botterill (born 1947), Canadian speed skater
- Doreen Meier (born 1968), German footballer and manager
- Doreen Nabwire (born 1987), Kenyan former footballer
- Doreen Nziwa (born 1982), Kenyan rugby player
- Doreen O'Connor (born 1950), Fijian lawn bowler
- Doreen Porter (born 1941), New Zealand sprinter
- Doreen Ryan (born 1931), Canadian speed skater
- Doreen Vennekamp (born 1995), German sport shooter
- Doreen Wilber (1930–2008), American archer

== In other fields ==
- Doreen Akkerman, Australian cancer support worker
- Doreen Alhadeff, American real estate agent
- Doreen Bogdan-Martin, Secretary-General of the International Telecommunication Union
- Doreen Cantrell, British immunologist
- Doreen Colondres, Puerto Rican chef and author
- Doreen Corcoran (1934–2013), Northern Irish historian
- Doreen Giuliano, mother of American convicted murderer John Cuica
- Doreen Granpeesheh, American psychologist
- Doreen Kabareebe (born 1990), Ugandan fashion model, socialite, branding coach and social media influencer
- Doreen Kartinyeri (1935–2007), Australian historian
- Doreen Kessy, Tanzanian entrepreneur
- Doreen Kimura (1933–2013), Canadian psychologist and educator
- Doreen Kong (born 1970), Hong Kong solicitor and politician
- Doreen Kuper, entrepreneur from Solomon Islands
- Doreen Liu, Singaporean businesswoman and philanthropist
- Doreen Lofthouse (1930–2021), British businesswoman
- Doreen Main, Scottish plant geneticist
- Doreen Majala (born 1990), Kenyan lawyer and news anchor
- Doreen Massey (geographer) (1944–2016), British social scientist and geographer
- Doreen Norton (1922–2007), English nurse and innovator
- Doreen Othero (ca. 1960), Kenyan, regional coordinator for population, health, and the environment research and policy development for the East African Community
- Doreen Paul (born 1962), Dominican banker
- Doreen Rosenthal, Australian psychological, adolescent health and HIV/AIDS researcher
- Doreen Simmons (1932–2018), English commentator
- Doreen Canaday Spitzer (1914–2010), American archaeologist
- Doreen Thomas, South African and Australian engineer and mathematician
- Doreen Warriner (1904–1972), British economist who saved Czech refugees in World War II
- Doreen Wicks (1935–1904), Canadian nurse, humanitarian and Citizenship Judge
- Doreen Yarwood (1918–1999), English historian

== Fictional characters ==
- Doreen Corkhill, in the British soap opera Brookside
- Doreen Fenwick, in the British soap opera Coronation Street
- Doreen Green, known as Squirrel Girl, in comic books published by Marvel Comics
- Doreen Lostock, in the British soap opera Coronation Street
