= Curragh Camp =

Irish army base and college

Coordinates: 53°08′51″N 06°49′59″W

- Campa an Churraigh
- The Curragh, County Kildare

Site information
- Type: Military installation, education and training centre
- Controlled by: Irish Defence Forces/Department of Defence

Site history
- Built: 1855
- In use: 17th century – present

Garrison information
- Garrison: Military College; 1 Mechanised Infantry Company; 1 Armoured Cavalry Squadron; DFTC Military Police company; Central Medical Unit detachment; DFTC Fire service; CIS Group; Engineer Group; Ordnance Group; Military Police Group; Transport Group; Army Ranger Wing

The Curragh Camp (Irish: Campa an Churraigh) is an army base and military college in the Curragh, County Kildare, Ireland. It is the main training centre for the Irish Defence Forces and is home to 2,000 military personnel.

== History ==
The Curragh has historically been a military assembly area, owing to the wide expanse of plain. In 1599, Henry Harvey noted "a better place for the deploying of an Army I never beheld." However, the Curragh's history goes further back; it is mentioned in the Annals of the Four Masters that Lóegaire Lorc, the king of Ireland, was slain on the Curragh by Cobthach Cóel Breg.

Richard Talbot, 1st Earl of Tyrconnel chose the Curragh as a muster point for the cause of James II during the Williamite War in Ireland. In 1783, a review of the Irish Volunteers raised to assist in the defence of the country while Great Britain was at war with America held on the Curragh attracted upwards of 50,000 spectators.

It was also a muster point during the 1798 Rebellion and was mentioned in the Irish peasant song The Sean-Bhean bhocht. As translated by Padraic Colum in 1922:

And where will they have their camp?

Says the Shan Van Vocht;
Where will they have their camp?
Says the Shan Van Vocht;
On the Curragh of Kildare
the boys will be there,

with their pikes in good repair.

=== Crimean War ===
There were numerous training camps organised on the Curragh in the 19th century including for training militia to defend the UK during the Napoleonic Wars. However, the first permanent military structures were designed and built from 1855 by British soldiers of the Corps of Royal Engineers to support efforts in the Crimean War. These structures for 10,000 infantry were constructed of wood. The camp also had its own post office, a fire station, ten barracks, two churches, water-pumping station, courthouse and clock tower.

=== 19th-century ===
In 1861, Queen Victoria and Prince Albert visited to inspect troops, including their son, Edward, Prince of Wales, who was serving at the camp. A great troop review was held for the visit and an album of the occasion can be found in the Royal Archive at Windsor Castle.

The first of the "modern" barracks (Beresford Barracks) was built at the camp in 1879, and six new barracks were subsequently constructed around the start of the 20th century: Ponsonby Barracks, Stewart Barracks, A.S.C Barracks, Engineer Barracks, Gough Barracks and Keane Barracks.

By 1893, the General Officer Commanding (GOC) was Major-General Lord Ralph D. Kerr CB. The garrison was the 1st Battalion Royal Irish Regiment (18th Foot), the 1st Battalion Lancashire Fusiliers (20th Foot), and the 2nd Battalion Worcestershire Regiment (31st Foot). In 1894, the Worcestershires were replaced by the 2nd Battalion the Hampshire Regiment (67th Foot).

The Curragh was isolated but offered recreational facilities such as hunting with the local gentry), postal deliveries and a daily Mass for Catholics at the East Church. A gun was fired every day at reveille, at 1pm and at 9.30pm.

=== Wrens of the Curragh ===
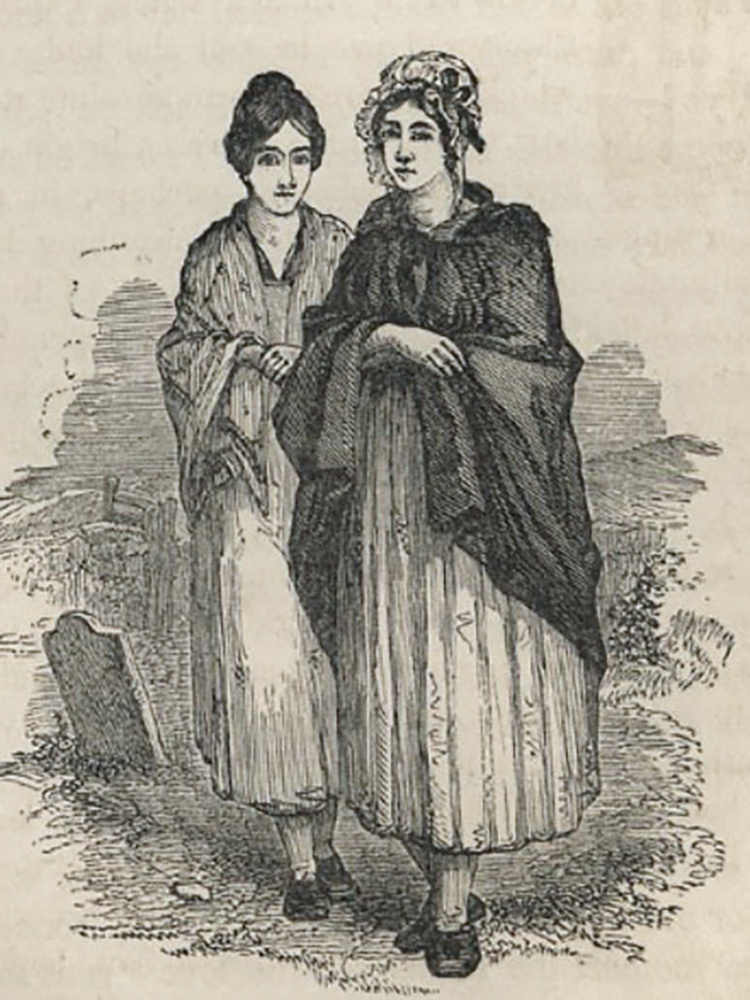
Two anonymous 'Wrens of the Curragh'

The Wrens of the Curragh were a community of women, who lived close to the Camp, in order that many of the women could be paid for sex work by the soldiers there. The Camp, like many military garrisons in Ireland at the time, attracted large numbers of prostitutes. It was mentioned in the British Parliament's Contagious Disease Acts, which allowed the authorities to stop and arrest women if they suspected them of being prostitutes.

The women lived in the furze-covered areas surrounding the camp, living in holes in banks and ditches with few possessions, in what were known as 'nests'. Their story gained prominence in a series of articles in the Pall Mall Gazette by the English journalist James Greenwood in 1867. His book The Seven Curses of London also contains a chapter on the Wrens.

The problem of sexually transmitted diseases due to the prevalence of prostitution and men willing to partake in their services can be seen by the numbers reporting with gonorrhea in the military hospital in the 1911 census.

=== Post office ===
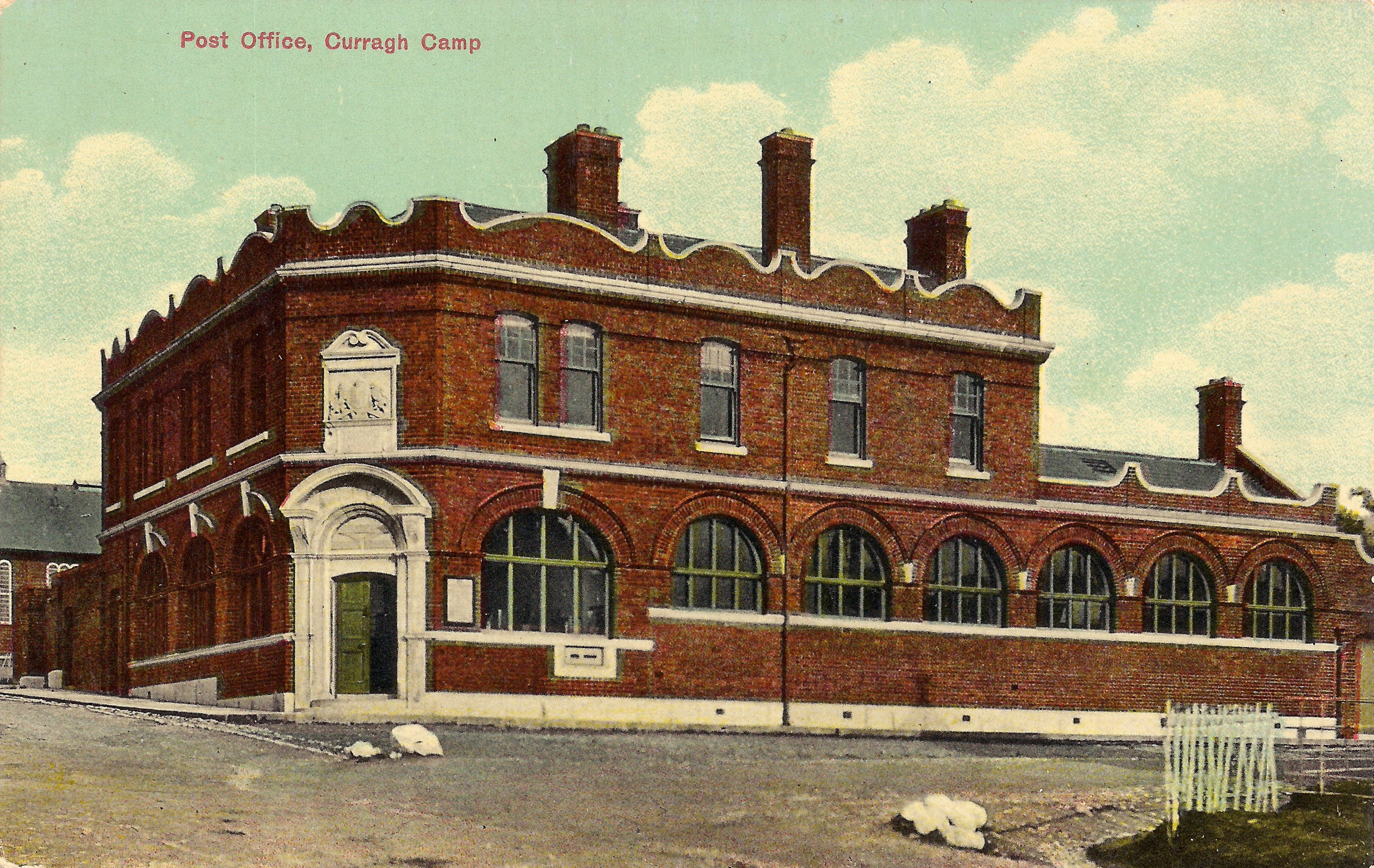
Postcard of the Curragh Camp Post Office c 1910

A purpose-built post office, designed by Robert Cochrane of the Board of Public Works, was constructed between 1899 and 1900 and was the second such building in Ireland after the General Post office. Positioned on a corner site in the centre of the camp, the red brick facade with stone details became a fairly standard post office design, with modifications, in many other post offices around the country. A 2002 survey of the building stated it was well maintained and An Post no longer runs post office services from the building.

=== Cemetery ===
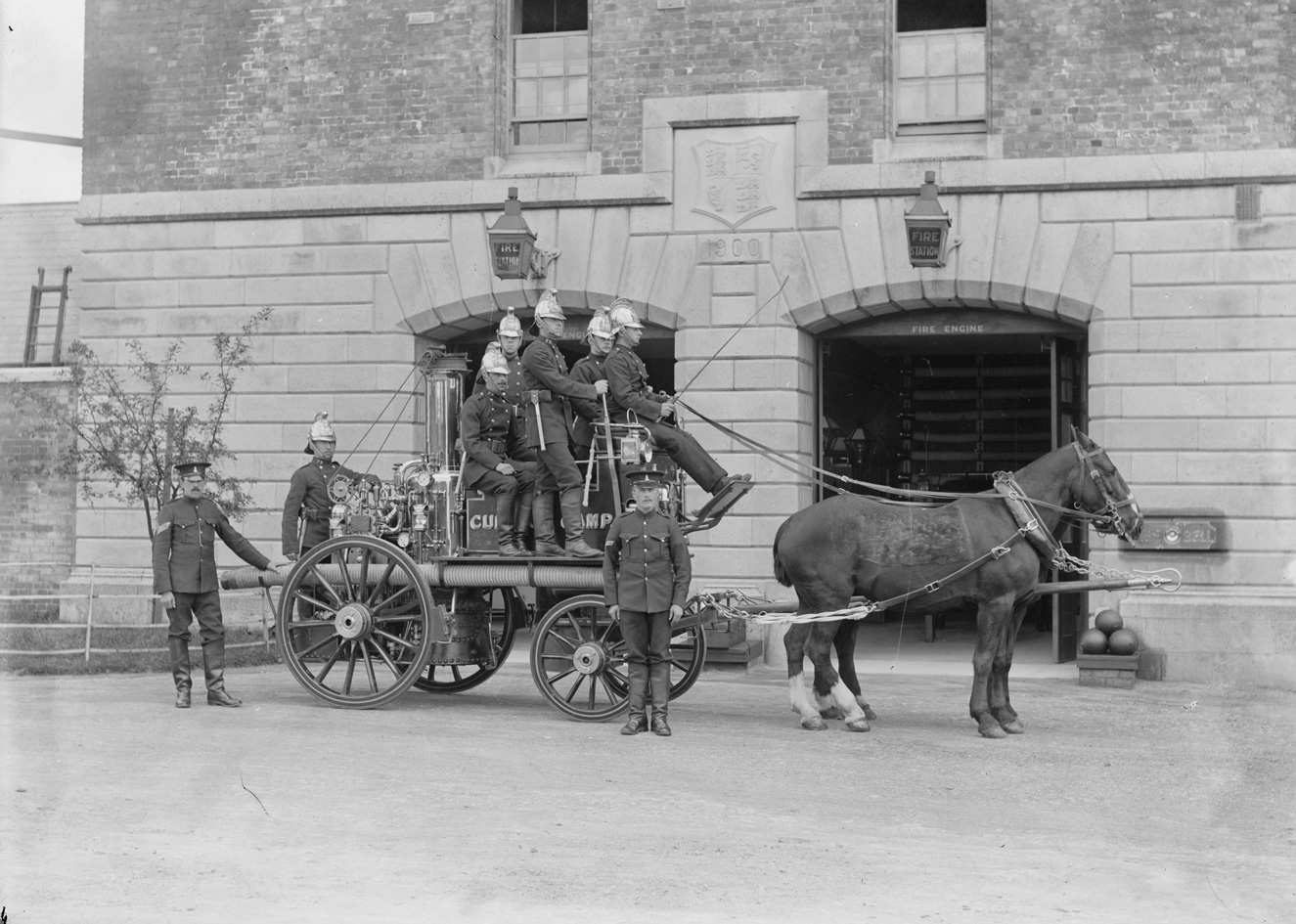
Curragh Camp fire brigade in 1902

The Curragh Cemetery has many graves that attest to the British Army presence on the Curragh up to their departure in 1922. The Commonwealth War Graves Commission maintains the graves of 104 servicemen who died at the camp during World War I, which are scattered throughout the cemetery.

=== Curragh incident ===
In March 1914, before the enactment of the Home Rule Act, the Camp became the scene of the Curragh incident, where a number of officers proposed to resign rather than enforce Home Rule against the will of the Unionists.

=== Internment and escapes ===
In August 1920, the British Parliament passed the Restoration of Order in Ireland Act 1920, which permitted military authorities to arrest (intern) any Irish person without charge or trial. Under Section 3(6) of the Act, the military established non-public courts martial, in which lawyers (appointed by the military) could be present only in death penalty cases. Inquests of military or police actions were also banned. The Act was not repealed until 1953. In 1921 there were several camps within the Curragh that were used to house internees to include Hare Park and Tintown camps. During the Irish Civil War (June 1922 – May 1923) at least 30 internment camps/prisons existed in Ireland which were used by the newly formed Irish government to hold internees opposed to the Anglo-Irish Treaty. The official internment camp at the Curragh was the Rath camp which held 1,300 internees in 60 wooden army huts on a ten-acre area. The compound was surrounded by ten foot high fences with machine gun towers at each corner.

Multiple escape attempts were made using tunnels and other means to get men out of the Curragh. In April 1921 a tunnel was discovered resulting in the loss of internee privileges. On 11 July 1921 the Irish War of Independence was ended with a truce and all tunneling at the Curragh was suspended. Thirty seven internees who were elected to the new Irish Parliament Dáil Éireann were released from the Curragh to consider the terms of the British peace terms. Because there was no general release of internees escape efforts continued.

On 9 September 1921, between 50 and 70 men escaped from the Hare Park internment camp at the Curragh Camp through a tunnel which took over a month to construct using only knives and spoons. When the tunnel was completed the internees waited for a foggy night and used the noise from an ongoing concert to make their escape. None of the escapees were ever recaptured.

=== Handover to Irish Free State ===
After the Anglo-Irish War (21 January 1919 – 11 July 1921) the British Army handed over Curragh Camp to the Irish Free State Army. The handover took place at 10 o'clock on Tuesday 16 May 1922, when the camp was handed over to a party of Irish troops commanded by Lieutenant General O'Connell. On Monday evening the Union Flag was lowered for the last time. At noon, O'Connell climbed the water tower and hoisted the first Irish tricolour to fly over the Curragh Camp. By tradition the British Army had cut down the flagpole requiring the Irish officers to physically hold the flagpole while the tricolour was raised. Both the Union Flag and the tricolour, which measures 10 ft × 18 ft (3.0 m × 5.5 m) are now preserved in the DFTC.

== Irish Civil War executions, deaths and hunger strikes ==
In December 1922, seven men were executed in the Curragh Military Prison. The Leinster Leader of 23 December 1922 reported that a column of ten men had operated against railways, goods trains and shops in the vicinity of Kildare for some time. Five of them had apparently taken part in an attempt to disrupt communications by derailing engines on 11 December. Two engines had been taken from a shed at Kildare and one of them had been sent down the line into an obstruction at Cherryville, thereby blocking the line. It was also alleged that goods trains had been looted and shops robbed in the locality. The same column was also reported to have taken part in an ambush of Free State troops at the Curragh siding on 25 November.

On 13 December, the men were surprised in a dug-out at a farmhouse at Moore's Bridge, on the edge of the Curragh plains, by Free State troops. In the dug-out were ten men, ten rifles, a quantity of ammunition, and other supplies. The men were arrested and conveyed to the Curragh. The proprietress of the farmhouse was also arrested and lodged in Mountjoy Prison.

Controversy surrounds the circumstances of the death of Thomas Behan, one of the men. One version has it that his arm was broken when he was being apprehended and he was subsequently killed by a blow of a rifle butt on the head at the scene of the raid when he was unable to climb on the truck that conveyed the men to the Curragh. The official version was that he was shot when attempting to escape from a hut in which he was detained in the Curragh Camp.

Those who were executed:

- Stephen White (18) Abbey Street, Kildare
- Joseph Johnston (18) Station Road, Kildare
- Patrick Mangan (22) Fair Green, Kildare
- Patrick Nolan (34) Rathbride, Kildare
- Brian Moore (37) Rathbride, Kildare
- James O'Connor (24) Bansha, County Tipperary
- Patrick Bagnall (19) Fair Green, Kildare

A memorial to the executed men can be found in Kildare Town.

During the Irish Civil War, at least two men died in the Curragh Camp while in custody: Owen Boyle on 13 November 1923 and Frank O'Keefe also in 1923 (day of year not stated).

During this time, Irish Republican prisoners in Mountjoy Prison began the 1923 Irish Hunger Strikes, protesting against the continuation of internment without charges or trial and poor prison conditions. The strike quickly spread to other camps and prisons nationwide with the Curragh having the largest number of strikers – 3,390. Four prisoners died in the Curragh as the result of hunger strikes: Joseph Whitty, aged 19 (while on Hunger strike) on 2 September 1923, Dan Downey (who died in Curragh's Hospital Wing on 10 June 1923 due the effects of an earlier hunger-strike), Denny Barry (while on hunger strike) on 20 November 1923 and Joe Lacey, brother of Dinny Lacey, who died on 24 December 1923 in the Curragh Camp hospital from complications due to his participation in the 1923 Irish Hunger Strikes.

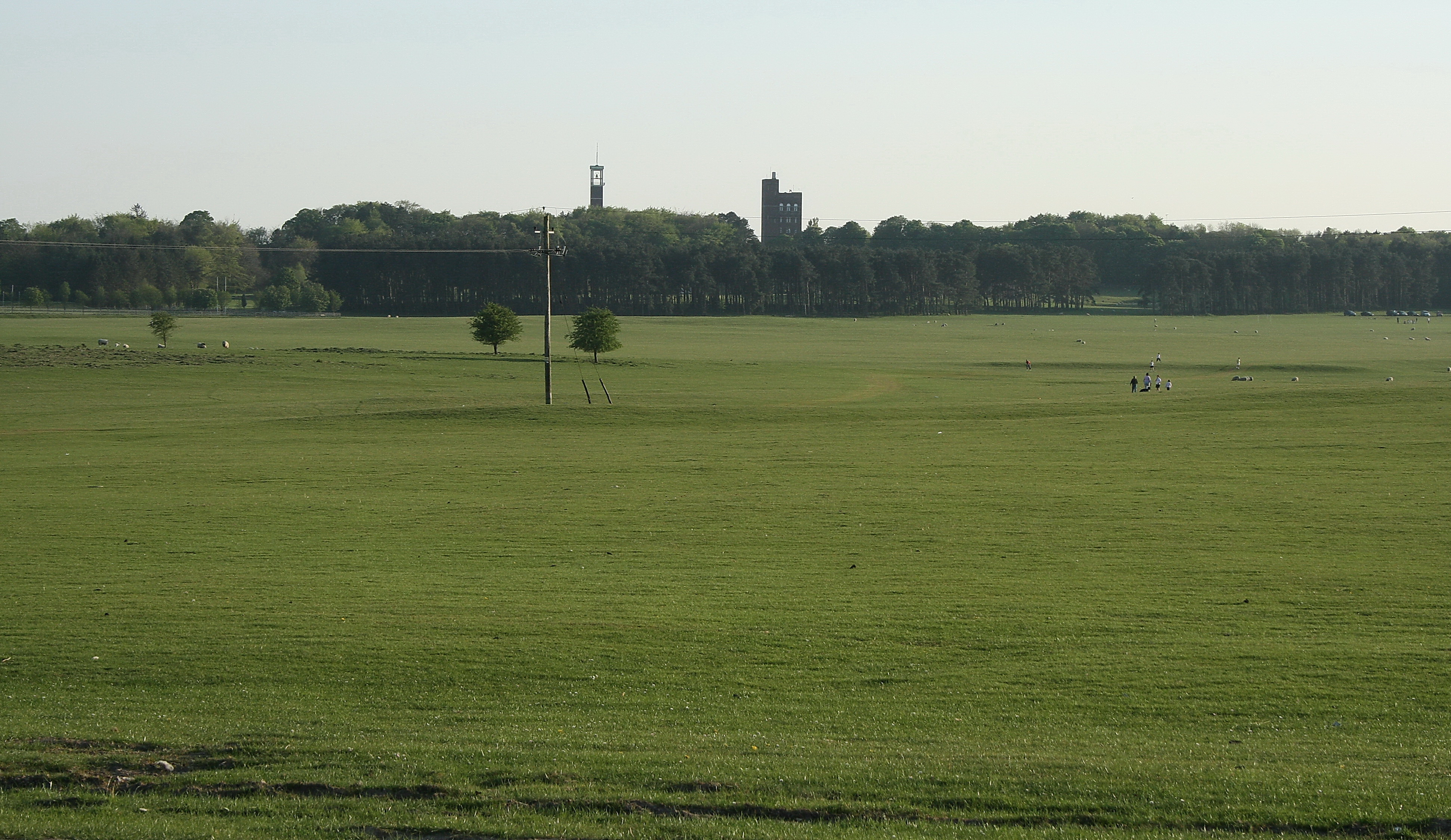
The Curragh Camp viewed from the surrounding Curragh plain

=== Internment during the Emergency ===
During the Emergency (1939–1946), internment of Irish Republicans was again instituted by the Fianna Fáil government of Éamon de Valera. On 3 September 1939, the Irish parliament Oireachtas enacted the Emergency Powers Act 1939, which gave the government the power to intern foreign nationals and Irish citizens. During the IRA's campaign of bombing and sabotage in England from 1939 to 1940 (the S-Plan), many Irish republicans were deported and interned in the Curragh. IRA members who were arrested by the Garda Síochána (the police and security service of Ireland) were also interned in the Curragh under the Offences against the State Acts 1939–1998 for the duration of hostilities.

==== Burning of camp, killings and release of internees ====
By early June 1940, 400 IRA men were interned at the Curragh. In the Fall of 1940 the internees began work on six tunnels from individual huts leading to one main escape tunnel. During unrest on 14 December 1940 the internees set fire to several huts, wind spread the fire to many huts exposing the escape tunnels. Prison guards fired on the internees with four wounded and one killed. Two days later Irish Republican internee Barney Casey from County Longford was shot and killed by military police in the camp. After these fires and killings 40 Camp leaders were placed in solitary confinement for ten weeks and subjected to severe beatings.

The camp was usually called Tin Town (Baile an Stáin or an Bhaile Stáin) by the internees. According to historian Tim Pat Coogan, around 2,000 IRA men passed time in the internment camp during the war years. According to Coogan:

"Gaeltachts, peopled entirely by Irish-speaking internees, were set up and Máirtín Ó Cadhain ran highly successful language classes. Other prisoners who had more education than these fellows gave tutorials in their own special subjects, and many a young Irish country lad who had left school at age twelve emerged from the Curragh with a far better education than he could possibly have acquired any other way."

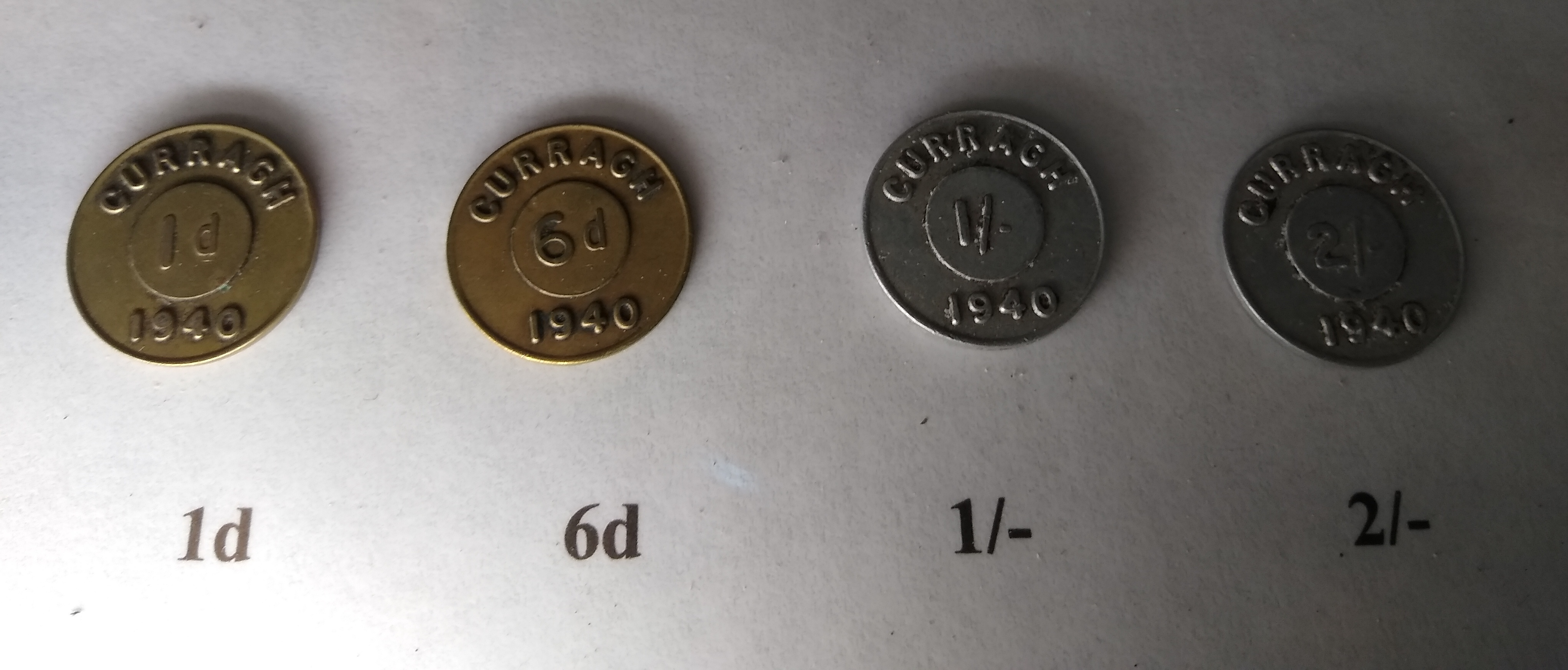
Tokens used at the camp in the 1940s

Also according to Coogan, the years in internment left a great mark on the IRA veterans who remained there for long.

"Most men, on leaving the internment camp, were so unable to deal with ordinary life that it took upwards of six months before any of them could screw up their courage to do normal things such as signing on at the Labour Exchange to draw unemployment benefits or applying for jobs. Even to cross the road was a terrible effort, the traffic, thin enough after the war, seemed fantastic after the years in the Curragh. The difference in women's fashion frightened them and added to the general air of unfamiliarity. After years in confinement with adult men, children seemed fragile and small scale. Most remained republicans in sympathy, but had no means of solving the border problem. Some were broken and turned to drink or had nervous breakdowns."

In June 1945 the Irish government ordered the closure of the internment camp with many of the prisoners being released within a few months. Internment of several hundred men and women continued in Northern Ireland. A member of Northern Irelands Parliament T.J.Campbell wrote to the Prime Minister of Northern Ireland (Basil Brooke) concerning the continuation of internment: "This Government [of Northern Ireland] and the British Government, as alder and abettor, can gleefully claim proud possession of the one remaining concentration camp in Western Europe."

=== Internment of belligerents and border campaign internments ===
It was also used to intern Allied and Axis personnel who had found themselves in Ireland during World War II. There were three sections in the camp at the time: one each for the IRA, Allied airmen and German mariners and airmen. British personnel were interned at the Curragh, whereas US personnel were repatriated due to an agreement between the Irish and US governments, though one US citizen, Roland Wolfe, whose nationality had been stripped by the US Government for fighting with the British (in No. 133 Squadron RAF) prior to the US entry to the war, was also interned. The Allied and Axis "internees" at the Curragh were not strictly contained, and were allowed to attend social events outside the detention camp. There was a film made about the World War II detention camp, in 1998, called "The Brylcreem Boys".

The Curragh Internment Camp held members of the Irish Republican Army (IRA) during its 1956–62 Border campaign. On 2 December 1958, 14 internees escaped from the Camp. The Camp contained approximately 150 men, the last of the internees were eventually released and the internment camp was closed on 11 March 1959.

== Modern Curragh Camp ==
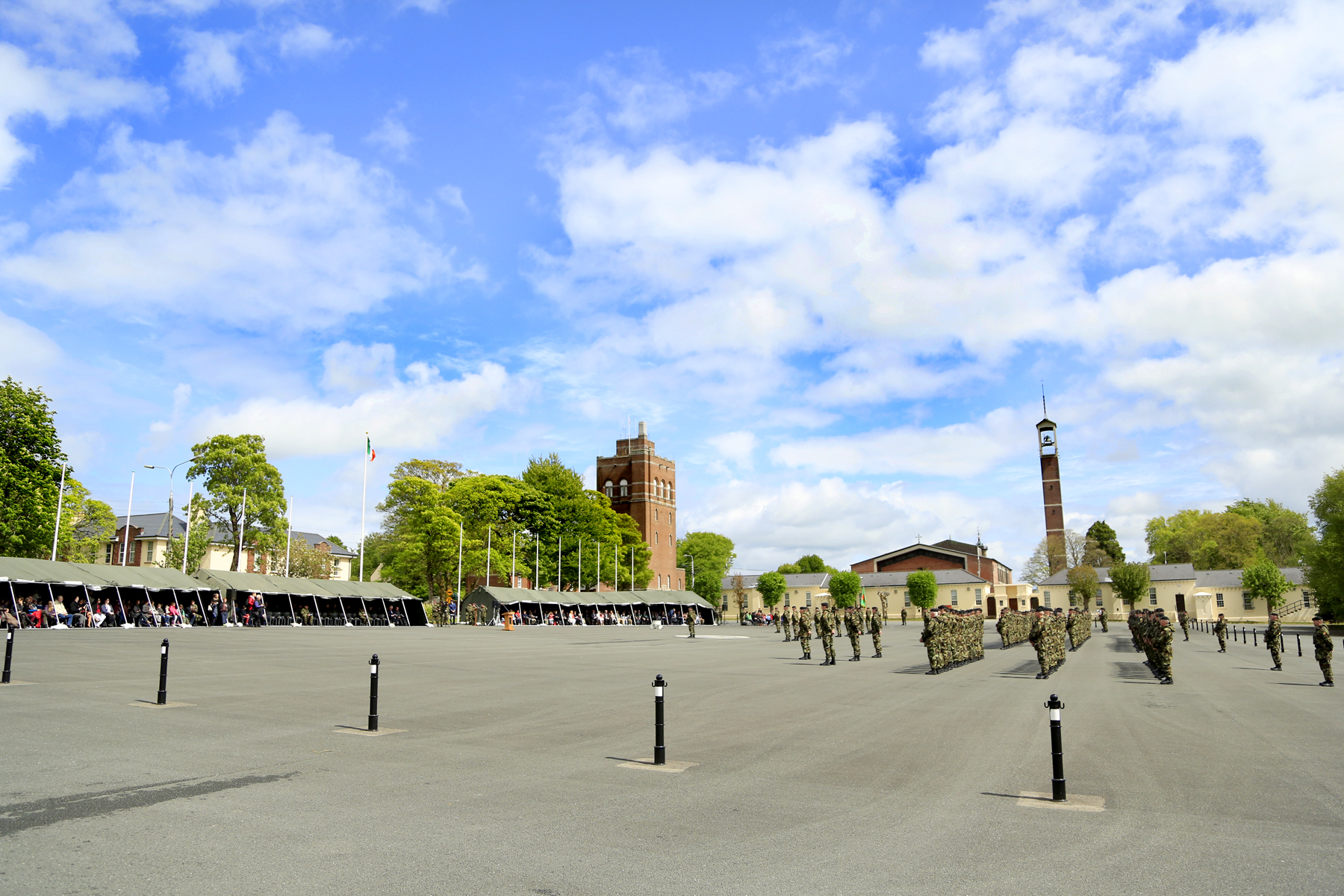
The Curragh Camp is home to the Defence Forces Training Centre

The Curragh Camp is now home to the Defence Forces Training Centre of the Irish Defence Forces, housing the Command and Staff School, the Cadet School, the Infantry School, the Combat Support College, the Combat Services Support College, the Equitation School, a logistics base, a supply and services unit, and the United Nations School.

The Curragh Camp has seen modernisation in late 20th and early 21st century, with billet blocks being refurbished and dining and messing facilities upgraded for all ranks. Other developments include a workshop complex and a large garage for MOWAG Piranha AFVs.

The tallest building in the Curragh is the fire station, where the army maintain a modern fire fighting service. The Curragh Military Museum opened in 2010.

== See also ==
- Curragh incident
- Defence Forces Training Centre (DFTC)
- List of Irish military installations

== Sources ==
- Feehan, John (2008). Cuirrech lifé: the Curragh of Kildare, Ireland. School of Biology and Environmental Science, University College Dublin. ISBN 978-1-905254-24-8.
- Coogan, Tim Pat (1994). The IRA: a history. Roberts Rinehart Publishers. ISBN 978-1-879373-99-0.
