= Neville Dickie =

English blues and jazz pianist

Neville Dickie (born 1 January 1937 in Durham) is an English boogie-woogie and stride piano player. He has performed all over Europe and North America.

== Career ==
After serving in the RAF, Dickie left Durham and moved to London, where he began playing piano for small wages in various pubs. It was only after Doreen Davies, who was head of BBC Radio 2, noticed him at a BBC audition that he took a notable stride in his musical career. He has played on hundreds of BBC Radio broadcasts.

Dickie has produced scores of records and can be heard on hundreds of jazz recordings, as well as several recordings with the French pianist, Louis Mazetier. Dickie had a Top 40 UK hit single in 1969 with "Robin's Return" on the Major Minor Records label (MM 644). It reached number 33 on the UK Singles Chart.

His album Back to Boogie (1975) has sold over 100,000 copies. Dickie formed a band called the Rhythmakers in 1985 and continued to perform with that group and with his trio. When in the United States he frequently appeared with The Midiri Brothers and is annually hosted by the Tri-State Jazz Society for mid-Atlantic appearances. He also regularly appeared at the Scott Joplin International Ragtime Festival in Sedalia, Missouri, and other major jazz festivals around the United States.

== Partial discography ==
- The Robins Return (1969)
- Back To Boogie (1975)
- Eye Opener (1982)
- Taken in Stride (1985)
- Neville Dickie Meets Fats, the Lion, and the Lamb (1988)
- The Piano Has It (1993)
- Harlem Strut (1996)
- Shout for Joy - Neville Dickie and His Rhythm Kings, featuring Al Casey and Dick Morrissey, Southland (1997)
- Oh Play That Thing (1998)
- Charleston Mad (1998)
- Shout for Joy (1999)
- Never Heard Such Stuff! - Neville Dickie and Norman Emberson, Stomp Off Records (2004)
- Stride Summit (2004)
- To Be Played Any Time (2005)
- Don't Forget to Mess Around (2005)
- My Little Pride and Joy (2006)
- By Request (2007)
- Strut Miss Lizzie (2008)
- Stridin' The Blues Away (2008)
- Show Stoppers (2010)
- Just You, Just Me - Neville Dickie and Paul Asaro, Stomp Off Records (2013)
