= Dorsen =

Dorsen is a surname. Notable people with the surname include:

- Annie Dorsen (born 1973), American theater director
- Norman Dorsen (1930–2017), American attorney, author, and law professor

== See also ==
- Doreen (given name)
