= Edmund De Wind =

Recipient of the Victoria Cross

Edmund De Wind VC
- Born: 11 December 1883; Comber, County Down, Ireland
- Died: 21 March 1918 (age 34) near Grugies, France
- Military career
- Allegiance: Canada; United Kingdom
- Branch: Canadian Army; British Army
- Service years: 1914 – 1917 (Canada); 1917 – 1918 (UK) †
- Rank: Second Lieutenant
- Units: 15th Battalion, The Royal Irish Rifles
- Conflicts: World War I – German spring offensive
- Awards: Victoria Cross

Edmund De Wind, VC (11 December 1883 – 21 March 1918) was an Irish British Army officer during the First World War, and posthumous recipient of the Victoria Cross, the highest and most prestigious award for gallantry in the face of the enemy that can be awarded to British and Commonwealth forces.

Both his native Northern Ireland and his adopted home of Canada count De Wind amongst the men of their militaries who have earned the VC.

== Background ==
De Wind was born in Comber, County Down, Ireland on 11 December 1883 to Arthur Hughes De Wind, C.E., and Margaret Jane De Wind. He was educated at Campbell College and then went to work for the Bank of Ireland, Clones branch.

De Wind was living in Canada in 1914 and working for the Edmonton branch of the CIBC when World War I broke out.

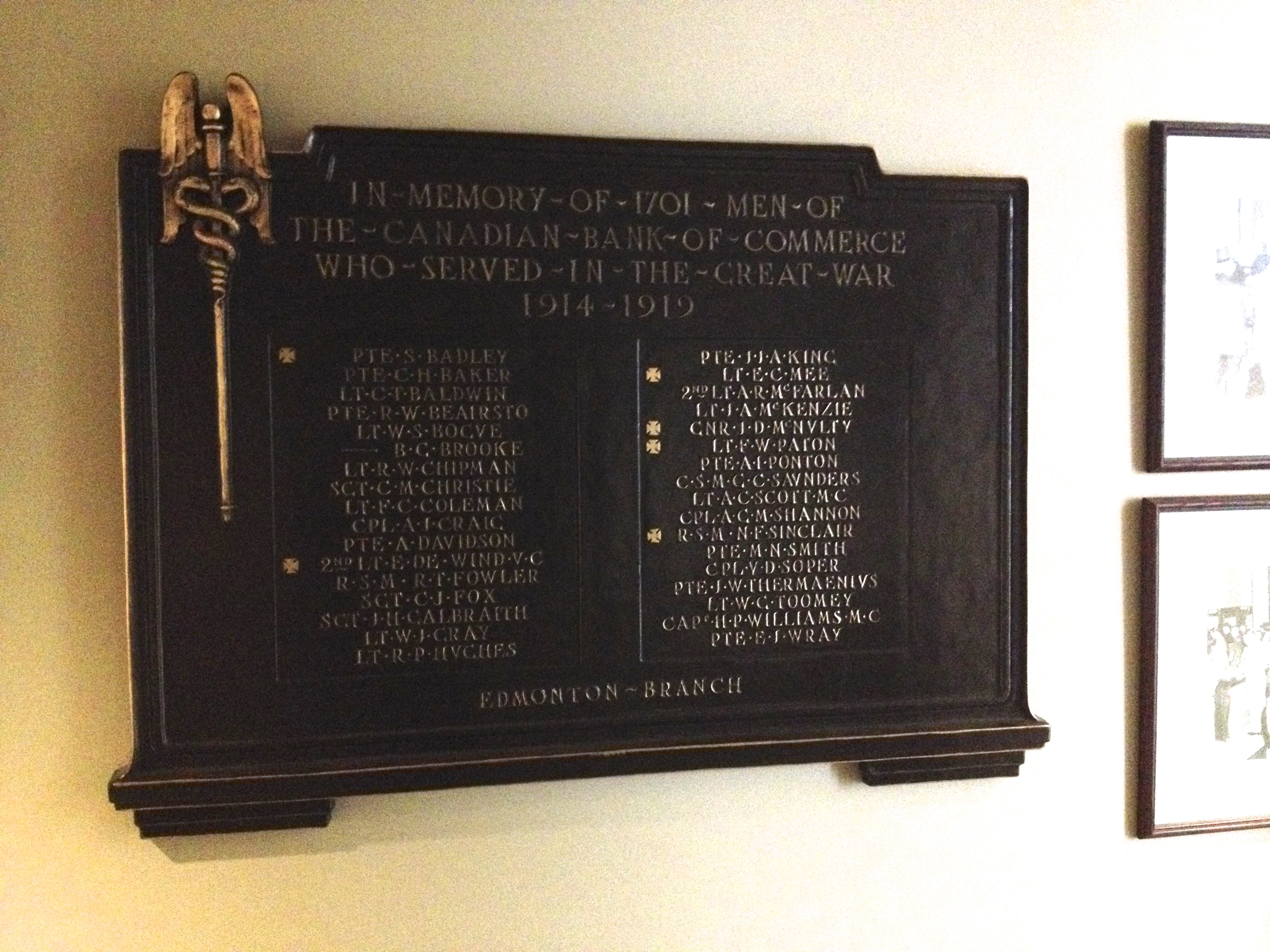
Plaque honouring CIBC employees from the Edmonton branch that fought in the Great War. It's located at the bank's main branch in Edmonton on Jasper Avenue. Edmund De Wind worked in this branch before joining the Canadian Corps and his name is on the plaque.

He served with The Queen's Own Rifles of Canada for a period of six months prior to his enlistment as a private on 16 November 1914 in the 31st Battalion-Alberta Regiment, Canadian Overseas Expeditionary Force. He arrived in France with 2nd Division of C.E.F. in September 1915. He saw action in the Battle of the Somme (1916) and at Vimy Ridge (1917). He earned a commission in September 1917 in the British Army.

== Victoria Cross ==
As a 34-year-old Second Lieutenant in the 15th Battalion, The Royal Irish Rifles, he was awarded the VC for deeds committed on 21 March 1918 to blunt the German spring offensive. He died on that day.

For most conspicuous bravery and self-sacrifice on the 21st March, 1918, at the Race Course Redoubt, near Grugies. For seven hours he held this most important post, and though twice wounded and practically single-handed, he maintained his position until another section could be got to his help. On two occasions, with two N.C.O.'s only, he got out on top under heavy machine gun and rifle fire, and cleared the enemy out of the trench, killing many. He continued to repel attack after attack until he was mortally wounded and collapsed. His valour, self-sacrifice and example were of the highest order.

— The London Gazette, 13 May 1919

== Commemoration ==
Ulster History Circle blue plaque, Bridge Street Link, Comber

De Wind is commemorated by a pillar, bearing his name and date of death, commissioned by his mother and installed at the main entrance on the west front of St Anne's Cathedral, Belfast. The entire west front, dedicated in 1927, forms a memorial to the Ulster men and women who served and died in the Great War. He is also named on the Pozières Memorial, in the Somme department of France, to the missing of the Fifth Army. There is a plaque memorial in his old school, Campbell College, Belfast. In his home town of Comber, he is commemorated by an Ulster History Circle blue plaque, unveiled in 2007.

Mount De Wind, Alberta, Canada, is named after him. A housing estate in Comber is also named in his honour. A metal plaque in Yorkton, Saskatchewan marks the location of one of his residences.

== See also ==
List of Canadian Victoria Cross recipients
