= Canton of Saint-Quentin-3 =

Coordinates: 49.83°N 3.28°E

Saint-Quentin-3
- Canton
- Interactive map of Saint-Quentin-3
- Country: France
- Region: Hauts-de-France
- Department: Aisne
- No. of communes: {{{nbcomm}}}
- Area: 62.09 km^{2} (23.97 sq mi)
- Population (2023): 27,116
  - Density: 436.7/km^{2} (1,131/sq mi)
- INSEE code: 02 15

The canton of Saint-Quentin-3 (before 2015: Saint-Quentin-Sud) is an administrative division in northern France. It consists of the southern part of the town of Saint-Quentin and its southern suburbs. At the French canton reorganisation which came into effect in March 2015, the canton was expanded from 6 to 9 communes:

1. Castres
2. Contescourt
3. Gauchy
4. Grugies
5. Harly
6. Homblières
7. Mesnil-Saint-Laurent
8. Neuville-Saint-Amand
9. Saint-Quentin (partly)

== Demographics ==
Historical population
Year	Pop.	±% p.a.
2013	27,938	—
2018	27,504	−0.31%
Source: INSEE

== See also ==
- Cantons of the Aisne department
- Communes of France
