= Cathal O'Byrne =

Irish singer, poet and writer

Cathal O'Byrne (1876 – 1 August 1957) was an Irish singer, poet and writer.

== Early life ==
O'Byrne was born and raised at Balmoral, County Down, the son of parents from County Wicklow. He was employed at a grocery on Beersbridge Road in Ballymacarrett where he would befriend Joseph Devlin. He settled in the Falls Road area of Belfast where he lived with his sister Teresa in a house at 43 Cavendish Street. In 2004, the Ulster History Circle placed a blue plaque on this house in his memory.

== Career ==
O’Byrne and Devlin were both members of the Sexton Debating Society; O’Byrne also studied music with Carl Hardebeck.

He joined the Gaelic League in Belfast and became a popular singer and storyteller. His first publication was a book of poetry called A Jug of Punch (1900).

He was a stage manager of the Ulster Theater. He became involved with the IRA after the Easter Rising. In 1921 O'Byrne traveled to America as a freelance journalist and opened a bookstore. He would return to Ireland after raising $100,000 for victims of the Belfast riots through White Cross. He lost most of his savings in the Wall Street Crash of 1929 and moved in with his sister. He was a devout Catholic, and even interviewed the Pope. Known for his dandified dress style, Cathal remained a bachelor his entire life. O'Byrne suffered from a stroke one month before his death on 1 August 1957. He is remembered as an important figure in the Celtic revival in Northern Ireland.

His most famous book is entitled As I Roved Out: A Book of the North. He also wrote for the Irish News.

O'Byrne's poem "A lullaby" from Lane o' the Thrushes was set to words by an Irish composer of the same time, Hamilton Harty, in his Six Songs of Ireland.

== Published works ==
His publications include;

- A Jug of Punch (1900)
- The Lane of the Thrushes (with Cahir Healy) (1905)
- The Grey Feet of the Wind (1917)
- The Gaelic source of the Brontë genius (1932)
- From Far Green Hills (1935)
- The Burthen and the Returned Swank (1940)
- As I Roved Out: A Book of the North (1946)
- Ashes on the Hearth (1948)
- Pilgrim in Italy (1949)
