= No. 133 Squadron RAF =

Defunct flying squadron of the Royal Air Force

No. 133 (Eagle) Squadron RAF
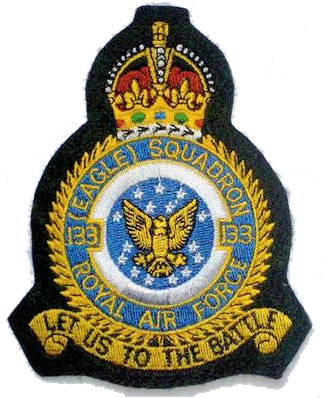
- Official badge of No. 133 squadron RAF
- Active: 1 March 1918 - 4 July 1918; 1 August 1941 – 29 September 1942
- Country: United Kingdom
- Allegiance: United Kingdom; United States (September 1942)
- Branch: Royal Air Force
- Nickname: Eagle
- Motto: Let us to the battle

Insignia
- Squadron Badge heraldry: On a hurt a semée of mullets argent, an eagle displayed Or
- Squadron Codes: MD (July 1941 - September 1942)

133 Squadron RAF was one of the famous Eagle Squadrons formed from American volunteers serving with the Royal Air Force (RAF) during the Second World War.

== History ==
133 Squadron was first formed in 1918 at RAF Ternhill. It was a training unit for the Handley Page O/400, flying the Royal Aircraft Factory F.E.2, that was expected to move to France, but was disbanded on 4 July 1918. Various attempts to reform as both a bomber and fighter squadron were all abandoned as the end of the First World War approached.

It was reformed at RAF Coltishall in July 1941 as the third of the Eagle Squadrons, equipped with Hawker Hurricane IIB fighters. It transferred to RAF Duxford in August, and by October was at RAF Eglinton, County Londonderry in Northern Ireland, where it was equipped with Supermarine Spitfire IIAs. It then transferred back to the south-east England including time at RAF Biggin Hill. The squadron ran fighter sweeps over France until September 1942 when it was transferred to the USAAF and became the 336th Fighter Squadron of the 4th Fighter Group.

On an escort mission to Morlaix on 26 September 1942 the squadron was held up by strong headwinds, leading it to mistake Brest for the British coast. They lost 11 out of 12 of their new Spitfire Mk IXs, four pilots being killed, six captured (one of whom was later murdered by the Germans after taking part in the escape from Stalag Luft III) and one evading. The squadron was transferred to the USAAF three days later, but this was part of a previously planned transfer of all three Eagle Squadrons to US command, and not a reaction to the Morlaix disaster.

=== 1941 Spitfire crash in the Republic of Ireland ===
In November 1941, while the squadron was based in Northern Ireland (see above), one of its pilots – Pilot Officer Roland "Bud" Wolfe of Nebraska – crashed in the Republic of Ireland. Because the republic was officially neutral throughout the war, Wolfe was interned.

While he was on patrol near the Inishowen peninsula, the engine of Wolfe's Spitfire suddenly overheated and began to lose power and altitude. As he was unable to land safely, Wolfe decided to abandon his aircraft. After bailing out, he landed in County Donegal. His Spitfire crashed in a heather-covered area of Moneydarragh, Gleneely.

After being arrested, Wolfe was sent to Curragh Camp, where Allied military aviators were interned by the Irish government during the war. Wolfe spent two years in the camp, before he was able to return to active service as a fighter pilot (by which time both he and his squadron had been officially transferred to the United States Army Air Forces).

On 28 June 2011, Wolfe's Spitfire was recovered by a team led by aviation historian Johnny McNee. The recovery was filmed for documentary purposes by the BBC.

== Aircraft operated ==
- 1918 - Royal Aircraft Factory FE.2b
- 1941 - Hawker Hurricane IIB
- 1941 - Supermarine Spitfire IIB
- 1942 - Supermarine Spitfire VA and VB
- 1942 - Supermarine Spitfire IX

== Fiction ==
In the 2005 episode of Doctor Who "The Empty Child", Jack Harkness, from the 51st century, poses as a volunteer in the squadron during 1941.
