= Ulster History Circle =

Heritage organization in the UK

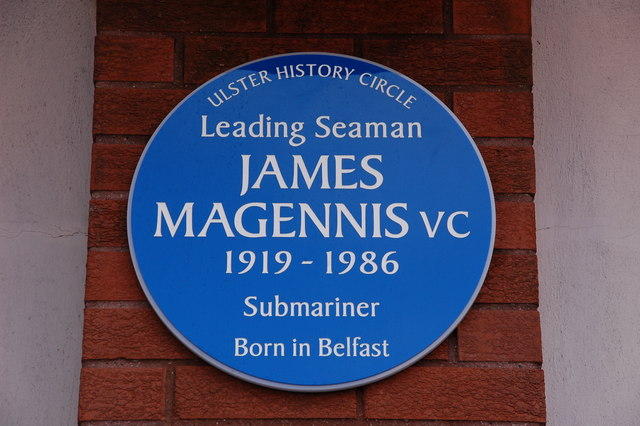
Blue plaque for James Magennis in Belfast

The Ulster History Circle is a heritage organisation that administers blue plaques for the area that encompasses the province of Ulster on the island of Ireland. It is a voluntary, not-for-profit organisation, placing commemorative plaques in public places in honour of people and locations that have contributed to all genres of history within the boundaries of the nine-county province of Ulster. Founded in the early 1980s, the group receives no government funding, unlike many similar organisations in the United Kingdom. The Circle also maintains the Dictionary of Ulster Biography.

== History ==
The Ulster History Circle is a heritage organisation that administers blue plaques for the area that encompasses the province of Ulster. The organisation was conceived in the 1980s by James Hawthorne, who wanted to recognise people who had made a significant contribution to Ulster’s heritage. The exact date of the founding of the organisation is unknown, as it was lost when James Hawthorne died in 2006.

The organisation is a voluntary, not-for-profit organisation, placing commemorative plaques in public places in honour of people and locations that have contributed to all genres of history within the boundaries of the nine-county province of Ulster. The group receives no government funding, unlike many similar organisations in the United Kingdom. The Circle also developed and maintains the Dictionary of Ulster Biography (DUB) and publishes a Guide to blue plaques.

Doreen Corcoran served as chair of the Circle from 1998 to 2009.

The first plaque placed was in honour of the artist William Conor, at his former studio on Stranmillis Road in Belfast.

== Blue plaques recipients in Ulster ==
Since the first plaque was formally unveiled over 150 individuals have been honoured, including:

- Cecil Frances Alexander, hymn writer
- Mabel Annesley, artist and wood engraver
- Thomas Andrews, designer of RMS Titanic
- Joe Bambrick, soccer player
- Samuel Beckett, playwright
- Samuel Black, pioneer cardiologist
- Lilian Bland, pioneer aviator
- Edward Bunting, folk music collector
- Margaret Byers, educationalist
- Daniel Cambridge, soldier and recipient of the Victoria Cross
- Joseph Campbell, poet
- Joseph W. Carey, painter
- Amy Carmichael, missionary and writer
- Joyce Cary, novelist
- Francis Rawdon Chesney, soldier and explorer
- Margaret Clarke, artist
- Edward Coey, mayor of Belfast and philanthropist
- Mabel Colhoun, photographer, teacher and archaeologist
- William Conor, artist
- Kathleen Coyle, writer
- James Humbert Craig, artist
- James Bell Crichton, soldier and recipient of the Victoria Cross
- William Crolly, Archbishop of Armagh
- James Deeny, public health pioneer
- Edmund De Wind, soldier and recipient of the Victoria Cross
- George Dickson, rose grower
- William Steel Dickson, United Irishman
- John Dill, soldier
- Gerard Dillon, artist
- James Dilworth, New Zealand farmer, investor, speculator and philanthropist
- William Drennan, physician and radical
- John Boyd Dunlop, tyre inventor
- Timothy Eaton, businessman
- William John English, soldier and recipient of the Victoria Cross
- E. Estyn Evans, geographer
- Harry Ferguson, inventor
- Vere Henry Lewis Foster, educationalist
- William Gibson, goldsmith and philanthropist
- Sarah Grand, novelist and suffragette
- W. A. Green, photographer
- Paul Henry, artist
- Robert Mitchell Henry, academic
- John Hewitt, poet
- Chaim Herzog, sixth President of Israel
- The Huguenot Community
- Barney Hughes, master baker and philanthropist
- Brian Desmond Hurst, film director
- Francis Hutcheson, philosopher and teacher
- Alexander Irvine, writer
- Otto Jaffe, Lord Mayor of Belfast 1899 and 1904 and philanthropist
- James Johnston, tenor
- Samuel Kelly, coal importer and philanthropist
- Kellys Cellars, meeting place of the United Irishmen
- John King, explorer
- Charles Lanyon, architect
- Philip Larkin, poet
- John Lavery, painter
- Charles Lever, novelist
- C. S. Lewis, author
- Charles Davis Lucas, naval officer and first recipient of the Victoria Cross
- John Luke, artist
- Robert Wilson Lynd, writer
- Robert Shipboy MacAdam, antiquarian and Gaelic scholar
- Aodh Mac Aingil, scholar, poet and bishop
- George Macartney, 1st Earl Macartney, diplomat
- Thomas McCabe and William Putnam McCabe, United Irishmen
- Luke Livingston Macassey, civil engineer and barrister
- Samuel McCaughey, sheep farmer and politician
- John Macoun, explorer and naturalist
- Henry Joy McCracken, United Irishman
- Mary Ann McCracken, social reformer
- James MacCullagh, mathematician and physicist
- Charles McKimm, first General Superintendent of Parks for the City of Belfast
- Michael McLaverty, writer
- Louis MacNeice, poet
- Martha Magee, benefactor
- James Joseph Magennis, submariner and recipient of the Victoria Cross
- Guglielmo Marconi, radio pioneer
- W. F. Marshall, preacher and poet
- Colin Middleton, artist
- Rinty Monaghan, World Champion boxer
- Brian Moore, novelist
- James Murray, inventor of milk of magnesia
- Andrew Nicholl, painter
- Sister Nivedita (Margaret Elizabeth Noble), writer and Indian nationalist
- Cathal O'Byrne, singer, poet and writer
- Stewart Parker, playwright
- H. B. Phillips, impresario
- Sir Henry Pottinger, 1st Baronet, first Governor of Hong Kong
- Robert Lloyd Praeger, naturalist and historian
- Rosamond Praeger, sculptor
- Robert Quigg, soldier and recipient of the Victoria Cross
- William Ritchie, pioneer shipbuilder
- Robert the Bruce, King of the Scots
- Paul Rodgers, shipbuilder
- Richard Rowley, poet
- George William Russell, writer, poet and artist
- George Shiels, playwright
- Sir Robert Staples, 12th Baronet, artist
- George Vesey Stewart, pioneer New Zealand settler
- Robert Sullivan, educationalist
- Jonathan Swift, cleric and writer
- Hugh Thomson, illustrator
- William Thomson, 1st Baron Kelvin, scientist
- Anthony Trollope, novelist
- Helen Waddell, poet and writer
- Sir Richard Wallace, 1st Baronet, philanthropist and art collector
- Ernest Walton, physicist and Nobel Laureate
- George Stuart White, soldier and recipient of the Victoria Cross
- William Whitla, physician and politician
- Oscar Wilde, playwright and poet
- Guy Wilson, daffodil breeder
- John Butler Yeats, artist and writer
- James Young, actor and comedian
- Annie Russell Maunder, astronomer
- Dorothy Parke, musician and composer

== See also ==
Kate Newmann
