= Gabor Szilasi =

Canadian photographer (1928–2026)

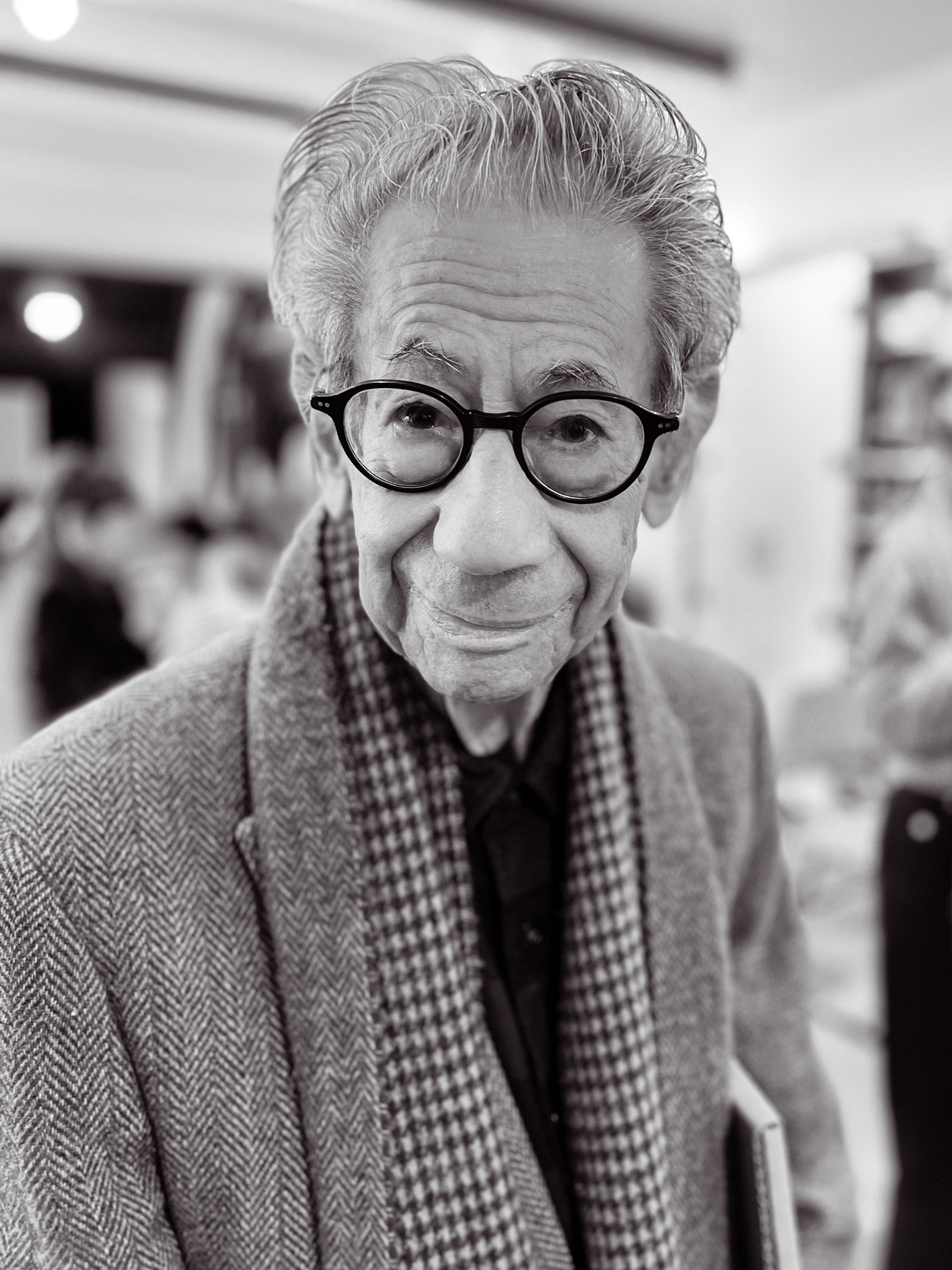
- Szilasi in 2022
- Born: 3 February 1928; Budapest, Hungary
- Died: 10 April 2026 (aged 98); Montreal, Quebec, Canada
- Known for: Photographer
- Spouse: Doreen Lindsay

Gabor Szilasi (3 February 1928 – 10 April 2026) was a Canadian photographer known for the humanist vision of his social-documentary photography.

== Life and career ==
=== Background ===
Gabor Szilasi was born in Budapest, Hungary, in 1928. He was born Jewish but raised Lutheran as a way to protect him from anti-Semitic violence against he and his family. In 1944, most of his family was imprisoned by the Nazis during The Holocaust. Gabor Szilasi's mother died in a concentration camp, but the rest of the family survived. Gabor Szilasi's brother and sister died young. He started studying in medical school, but after he and his father were caught trying to escape communist Hungary in 1949, the Communists did not allow him to continue studying medicine.

=== Career ===
Szilasi first became interested in photography while in medical school in 1948. Largely self-taught, he started to photograph in Hungary in 1952, when he purchased his first camera, a Zorki (the Soviet copy of Leica II), after years of working as a labourer building the Budapest Metro. In 1956, he documented the Hungarian Revolution of 1956 in Budapest and shortly afterwards fled the country.

He emigrated to Canada in 1957, settling in Montreal. From 1959 to 1971, he was a photographer at the Office du film du Québec. That role involved travelling to photograph subjects throughout rural Quebec. Sam Tata introduced him to the work of Henri Cartier-Bresson and encouraged his social-documentary photography. In 1966, he was introduced to the work of the American documentary tradition as practised by Paul Strand and Walker Evans while studying at the Thomas More Institute. Throughout the 1960s, he shot personal photographs of friends and of Montreal; they were first exhibited in 1967.

Szilasi was a photography teacher at the Collège du Vieux Montréal (1970–1980) and associate professor (1980–1995) and then adjunct professor at Concordia University. From 1972 to 1974, Szilasi was a member of a group of Montreal artists called the Group d'action photographique, and his documentary photographs feature numerous members of the city's art scene.

The work he made of communities such as Charlevoix, Quebec (1970), Montreal's art community (1960–1980), or was commissioned to make in Italy, Hungary, and Poland (1986, 1987, 1990) or of Hungary to which he returned in 1980, 1994 and 1995 aimed at the modernist photography ideal of precision, luminosity and permanence which increased the beauty and historic value of his prints. He used the camera to take views of urban environments, individual portraits or gallery openings.

After 20 years of photographing in black-and-white, around the mid-1970s, Szilasi began to use colour to describe certain cultural and social characteristics. He began photographing interiors, mostly living spaces, in colour and later combined colour with black-and-white to convey portraits and interiors. Around 1982, he began photographing electric signs.

He is the subject of Gabor, a 2021 documentary film by Joannie Lafrenière.

=== Personal life and death ===
Szilasi was married to the photographer Doreen Lindsay.

He died at his home in Montreal on 10 April 2026, at the age of 98.

== Selected exhibitions ==
In 1997, the Montreal Museum of Fine Arts organized a travelling retrospective of his work titled Gabor Szilasi: Photographs 1954–1996. Monet's Garden was shown at the Montreal Museum of Fine Arts in 1999. In 2017, Montreal's McCord Museum exhibited a 20-year selection of his unpublished photographs of the art world in Montreal, titled The Art World in Montreal, 1960–1980.

== Awards ==
- Governor General's Awards in Visual and Media Arts, 2010
- Paul-Émile Borduas prize for visual arts, 2010
- Knight's Cross of the Order of Merit of Hungary Award, 2018
- Companion of the arts and letters of Quebec
- Knight, Order of Montreal, 2024

== Selected public collections ==
His work is included in the collections of the Musée national des beaux-arts du Québec, the Musée d'art contemporain de Montréal, the National Gallery of Canada and many other collections. He was represented by the Stephen Bulger Gallery in Toronto.

== Fonds ==
In 2021, Library and Archives Canada (LAC) acquired Gabor Szilasi's photographic archives containing more than 80,000 negatives and 42 photographic prints, including negatives of early photographs taken in Hungary during the uprising against the Soviet invasion, as well as photographic prints captured in rural Quebec and Montreal. It became part of the Gabor Szilasi fonds: a collection of the artist's works that LAC has been compiling since the 1970s.
