= Mabel Colhoun =

Photographer, teacher and archaeologist

Mabel Remington Colhoun
- Born: 2 November 1905; Derry, Ireland
- Died: 1992 (aged 86–87); Derry
- Website: towermuseumcollections.com/mabelcolhoun/

Mabel Colhoun (2 November 1905 – 1992), was a Derry-based pioneering photographer, teacher and archaeologist.

== Biography ==
Mabel Remington Colhoun was born on 2 November 1905 in Derry to John Colhoun and Lizzie Johnston Gordon. Her family were originally from Inishowen, County Donegal.

Colhoun trained in the Froebel educational technique. She worked as a teacher and was the first principal of the Preparatory Department in the Londonderry High School. She began working there in 1936 and retired in 1969. Colhoun also started a school in Deanfield, Derry and helped establish nursery schools throughout the 1950s and 1960s as the chair of the Londonderry Nursery School Association. She worked extensively on the area from which her family came, and her work was published in The Heritage of Inishowen: Its Archaeology, Heritage and Folklore.

During her life, Colhoun travelled extensively. In the 1920s she visited the pyramids. In the 1930s she hiked in the Alps. She toured the north of Ireland by bicycle. Colhoun documented archaeological monuments and transcribed stories and folklore in Ireland, many previously unrecorded. Colhoun did not just record the finds she came across but also ensured their survival. She worked to protect and recover those monuments she felt were at risk. She was nicknamed "The Ferret" for her ability to get to the bottom of details. She created an archive of historically useful material and her collections were donated to the Tower Museum in Derry which has since held exhibitions of her work. Her detailing of history included writing, sketches and thousands of photographs which are now being digitised by the archaeologist Denise Henry. Her photos document monuments, but also daily life in Ireland from the 1930s through the 1980s. In 2017 she was commemorated with a blue plaque from the Ulster History Circle to an "educationalist, historian, and archaeologist" on the museum.
