= Castres, Aisne =

Castres
- Commune
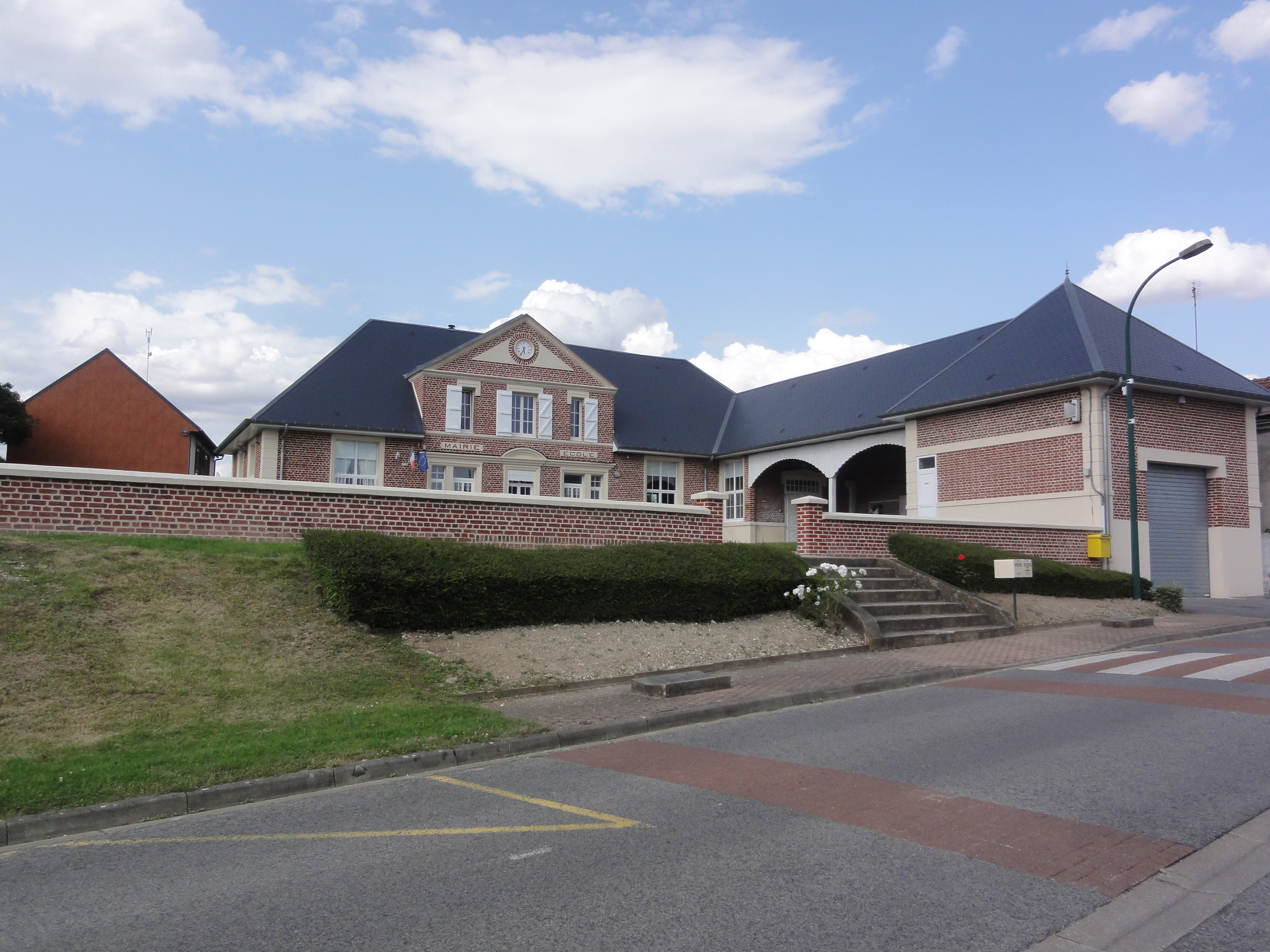
- The town hall and school of Castres

- Coat of arms
- Location of Castres
- Location within France Location within Hauts-de-France
- Coordinates: 49°48′16″N 3°14′18″E
- Country: France
- Region: Hauts-de-France
- Department: Aisne
- Arrondissement: Saint-Quentin
- Canton: Saint-Quentin-3
- Intercommunality: CA Saint-Quentinois

Government
  - Mayor (2026–32): Jean-Marie Accart
- Area^{1}: 5.71 km^{2} (2.20 sq mi)
- Elevation: 80 m (260 ft)
- Highest elevation: 104 m (341 ft)
- Lowest elevation: 67 m (220 ft)
- Population (2023): 246
  - Density: 43.1/km^{2} (112/sq mi)
- Time zone: UTC+01:00 (CET)
  - Summer (DST): UTC+02:00 (CEST)
- INSEE/Postal code: 02142 /02680
- ^{1} French Land Register data, which excludes lakes, ponds, glaciers > 1 km^{2} (0.386 sq mi or 247 acres) and river estuaries.

Castres (French pronunciation: [kastʁ]) is a commune in the Aisne department in Hauts-de-France in northern France.

== Population ==
Historical population
Year	Pop.	±% p.a.
1968	183	—
1975	170	−1.05%
1982	141	−2.64%
1990	156	+1.27%
1999	164	+0.56%
2007	216	+3.50%
2012	236	+1.79%
2017	244	+0.67%
2023	246	+0.14%
Source: INSEE

== See also ==
- Communes of the Aisne department
