= Bud Wolfe =

American spitfire pilot (1918–1994)

Roland Wolfe
- Portrait of Bud Wolfe
- Born: 12 January 1918
- Died: 28 January 1994 (aged 76)
- Military career
- Allegiance: United Kingdom; United States
- Branch: Royal Air Force; United States Army Air Forces; United States Air Force
- Rank: Lieutenant colonel
- Nickname: Bud
- Conflicts: World War II; Korean War; Vietnam War

Roland "Bud" Wolfe (January 12, 1918 – January 28, 1994), was an American pilot who parachuted from an RAF Spitfire plane into a peat bog on the Inishowen peninsula in County Donegal, Ireland, on 30 November 1941. The incident initiated a diplomatic row between Britain and Ireland.

The 23-year-old, a member of No. 133 Squadron RAF, originally from Nebraska, was on convoy patrol when his engine overheated, eight miles from his RAF station at Eglinton – now the City of Derry Airport. Realising he would certainly crash, he radioed back to his station with a last message: "I'm going over the side." He then pushed back the Spitfire's canopy, released his safety harnesses, jumped out of the plane, and parachuted down, landing in a peat bog on Irish soil.

The plane penetrated deep into the peat when it crashed. Seventy years later in 2011, historians Jonny McNee, Steve Vissard, Jeff Careless and Gareth Jones began searching for the missing Spitfire, following numerous failed attempts by others, in June 2011 they discovered the wreckage near Moneydarragh, Co Donegal with the aid of specialist detecting equipment. The team of archaeologists, also found the plane's six Browning .303 machine guns and about a thousand rounds of ammunition buried 15 feet deep.

Because he joined the British war effort while the US was still neutral, he was stripped of his US citizenship. The RAF pilot was interned at the Curragh army camp in the neutral state of Ireland. On 13 December 1941, he walked out of camp, caught the train from Dublin to Belfast and was back at RAF Station Eglinton within hours. He was subsequently arrested and held for two more years while the authorities in the UK and Ireland debated how to handle his escape. In 1943 he escaped again and this time was sent to the United States Army Air Forces (USAAF) where he served for the rest of the war.

He later served as a pilot in Korea and Vietnam, and died in Florida in 1994. He retired as a lieutenant colonel, with 12,000 flying hours logged and approximately 900 combat missions to his credit in all three wars.

The dig was filmed by Derry-based TV company 360 Productions for a BBC series on military archaeology, and the Spitfire plane is preserved at the Tower Museum in Derry. The machine guns recovered were found to be in relatively good condition and one was actually fired.
