= Gauchy =

- Commune
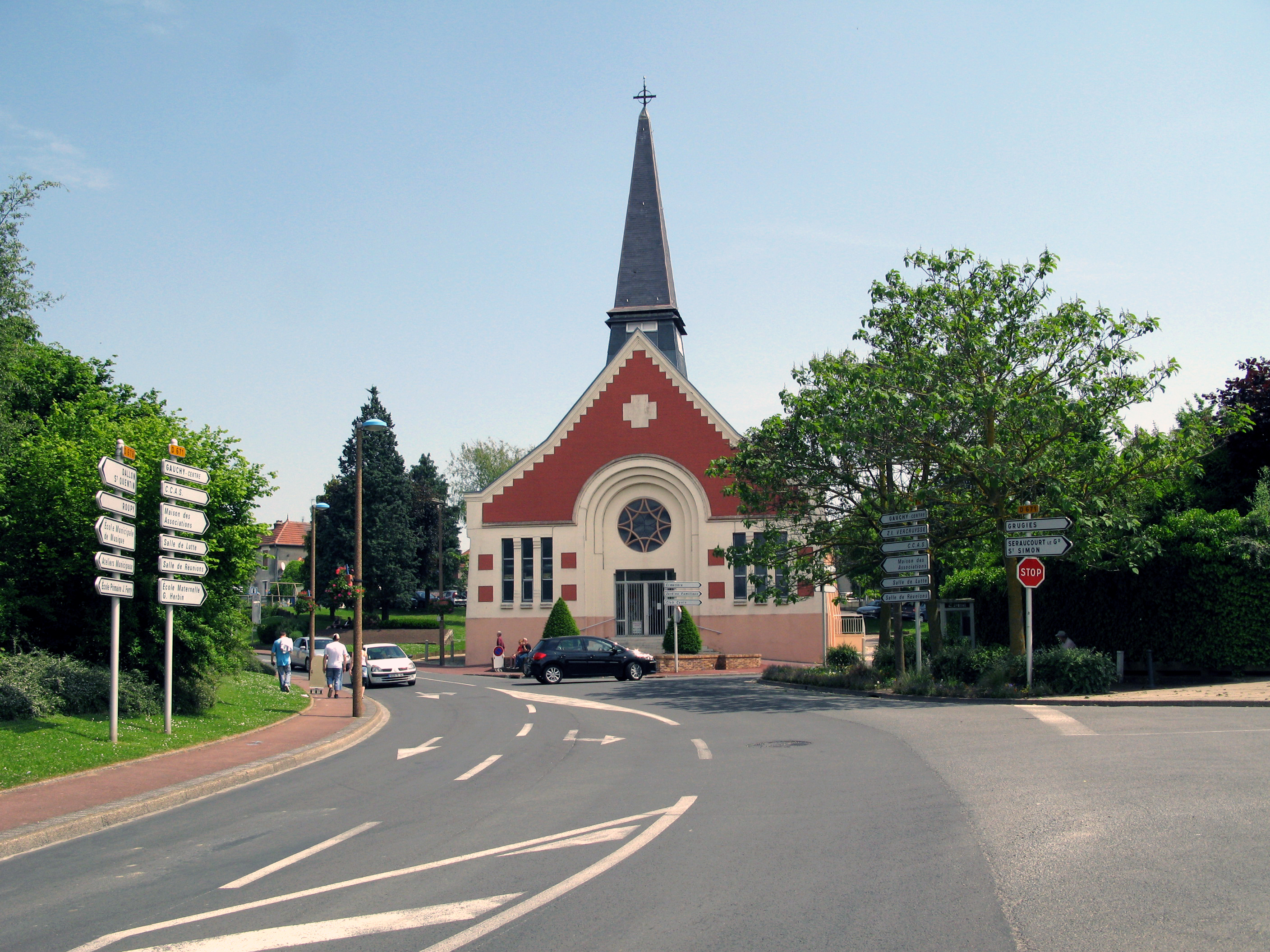
- The church of Gauchy
- Location of Gauchy
- Location within France Location within Hauts-de-France
- Coordinates: 49°49′30″N 3°16′14″E
- Country: France
- Region: Hauts-de-France
- Department: Aisne
- Arrondissement: Saint-Quentin
- Canton: Saint-Quentin-3
- Intercommunality: CA Saint-Quentinois

Government
  - Mayor (2026–32): Jean-Marc Weber
- Area^{1}: 6.24 km^{2} (2.41 sq mi)
- Elevation: 80 m (260 ft)
- Highest elevation: 118 m (387 ft)
- Lowest elevation: 68 m (223 ft)
- Population (2023): 5,183
  - Density: 831/km^{2} (2,150/sq mi)
- Time zone: UTC+01:00 (CET)
  - Summer (DST): UTC+02:00 (CEST)
- INSEE/Postal code: 02340 /02430
- ^{1} French Land Register data, which excludes lakes, ponds, glaciers > 1 km^{2} (0.386 sq mi or 247 acres) and river estuaries.

Gauchy (French pronunciation: [ɡoʃi]) is a commune in the Aisne department in Hauts-de-France in northern France.

== Population ==
Historical population

Year	Pop.	±% p.a.
1793	169	—
1821	322	+2.33%
1846	351	+0.35%
1872	465	+1.09%
1901	569	+0.70%
1911	507	−1.15%
1921	574	+1.25%
1926	2,529	+34.53%
1931	3,078	+4.01%
1936	2,451	−4.45%
1946	2,672	+0.87%

Year	Pop.	±% p.a.
1954	3,112	+1.92%
1962	3,503	+1.49%
1968	4,218	+3.14%
1975	5,663	+4.30%
1982	5,612	−0.13%
1990	5,736	+0.27%
1999	5,621	−0.22%
2007	5,678	+0.13%
2012	5,356	−1.16%
2017	5,276	−0.30%
2023	5,183	−0.30%

Source: EHESS and INSEE (1968-2023)

== See also ==
- Communes of the Aisne department
