= Mesnil-Saint-Laurent =

- Commune
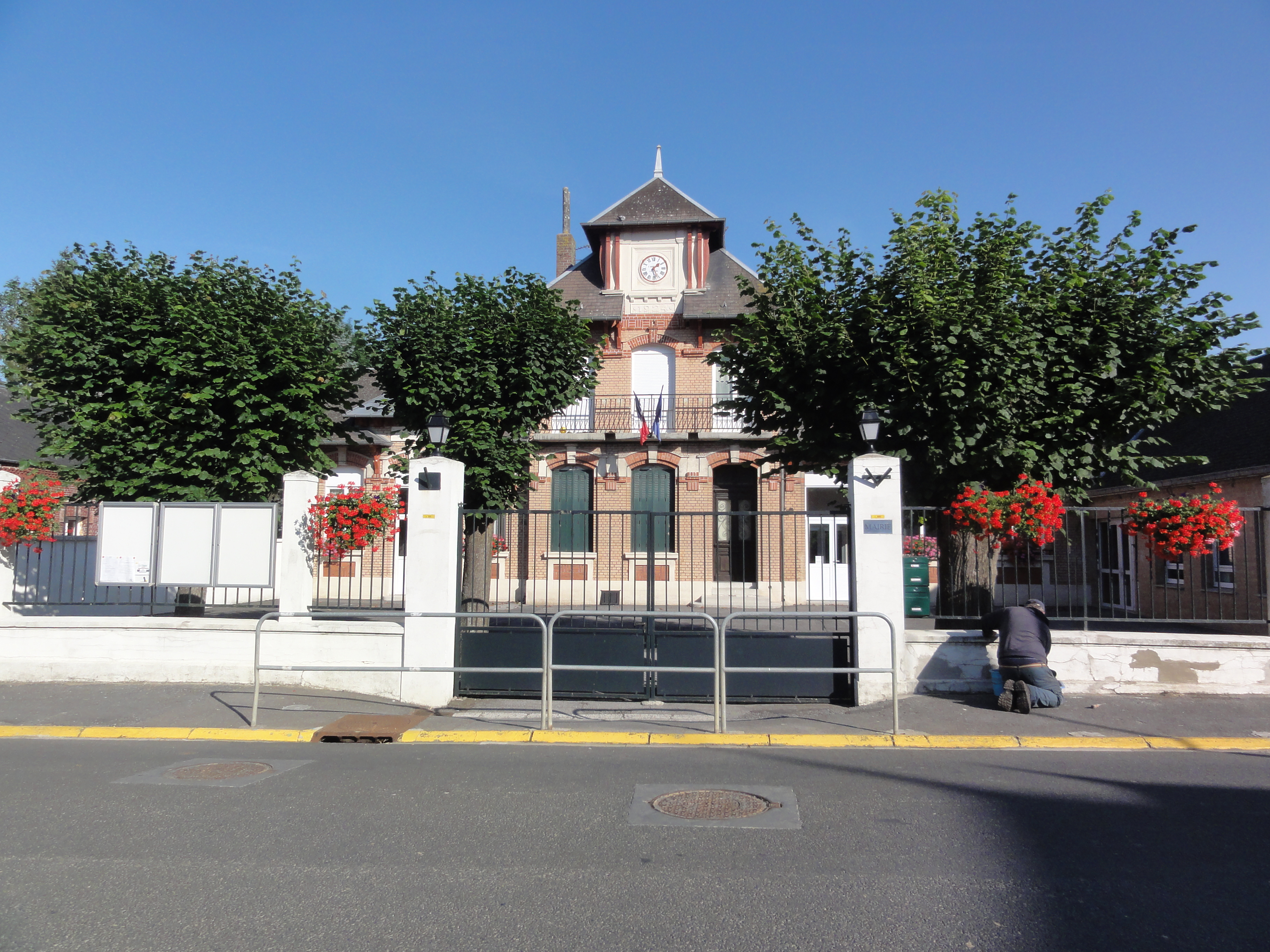
- The town hall of Mesnil-Saint-Laurent

- Coat of arms
- Location of Mesnil-Saint-Laurent
- Location within France Location within Hauts-de-France
- Coordinates: 49°49′49″N 3°21′20″E
- Country: France
- Region: Hauts-de-France
- Department: Aisne
- Arrondissement: Saint-Quentin
- Canton: Saint-Quentin-3
- Intercommunality: CA Saint-Quentinois

Government
  - Mayor (2026–32): Christian Moiret
- Area^{1}: 5.45 km^{2} (2.10 sq mi)
- Elevation: 121 m (397 ft)
- Highest elevation: 126 m (413 ft)
- Lowest elevation: 82 m (269 ft)
- Population (2023): 435
  - Density: 79.8/km^{2} (207/sq mi)
- Time zone: UTC+01:00 (CET)
  - Summer (DST): UTC+02:00 (CEST)
- INSEE/Postal code: 02481 /02720
- ^{1} French Land Register data, which excludes lakes, ponds, glaciers > 1 km^{2} (0.386 sq mi or 247 acres) and river estuaries.

Mesnil-Saint-Laurent is a commune in the Aisne department in Hauts-de-France in northern France.

== Population ==
Historical population
Year	Pop.	±% p.a.
1968	252	—
1975	299	+2.47%
1982	388	+3.79%
1990	430	+1.29%
1999	426	−0.10%
2007	443	+0.49%
2012	451	+0.36%
2017	476	+1.08%
2023	435	−1.49%
Source: INSEE

== See also ==
- Communes of the Aisne department
