= Ben Wicks =

Canadian cartoonist (1926–2000)

- Born: Alfred Wicks; October 1, 1926 London, England
- Died: September 10, 2000 (aged 73) Toronto, Ontario, Canada
- Area: Cartoonist
- Notable works: Wicks
- Spouse: Doreen Mary Wicks

Ben Wicks, CM (born Alfred Wicks; October 1, 1926 – September 10, 2000) was a British-born Canadian cartoonist, illustrator, journalist and author. His syndicated newspaper cartoon Wicks appeared in newspapers in Canada and the United States, and he was also known for his children's books and humanitarian work.

== Early life ==
Wicks was born into a working-class family in the East End of London. He learned to play the saxophone while serving in the British Army and later toured Europe as a musician.

Wicks and his wife, Doreen Wicks, immigrated to Canada in 1957. They initially settled in Calgary, where he worked at various jobs, including as a milkman, and later joined the Canadian Army as a musician. During this period, he studied cartooning and began submitting cartoons to magazines. One of his early successes was publication in The Saturday Evening Post.

== Cartooning career ==
In 1963, Wicks travelled to Toronto to explore opportunities as a cartoonist and met Toronto Telegram cartoonist Norman Drew. After subsequently moving to Toronto, Wicks began drawing The Outcasts for the Telegram. The cartoon was eventually syndicated to more than 50 newspapers.

After the Telegram ceased publication in 1971, Wicks's work was picked up by the Toronto Star. His daily cartoon, later titled Wicks, became widely syndicated. At its peak, it appeared in 84 Canadian newspapers and more than 100 newspapers in the United States.

Wicks also became a frequent guest on Canadian television and radio and hosted his own television program on the Canadian Broadcasting Corporation during the 1970s.

== Books and other work ==
Wicks wrote and illustrated a number of books and also illustrated the Katie and Orbie children's book series, written by his daughter Susan Wicks. The books were adapted into the animated television series Katie and Orbie in 1994 and were broadcast on Family Channel in Canada and PBS in the United States.

Canada Games also published a drawing-based board game associated with Wicks called Quick Pics with Ben Wicks, whose gameplay was similar to Pictionary.

Wicks opened a pub in Toronto's Cabbagetown neighbourhood called the Ben Wicks. The Parliament Street pub was later sold, although commemorative material associated with Wicks remained at the site.

== Humanitarian work ==
Wicks was involved in a number of humanitarian campaigns. He used his cartoons to draw attention to civilian suffering during the Biafran War and became involved with Oxfam. During the 1983–1985 famine in Ethiopia, he organized Cartoonists for Africa to raise money and public awareness. He also promoted children's literacy during the later part of his career.

In 1986, Wicks was appointed a Member of the Order of Canada.

In 1997, Wicks donated archival material to Ryerson University.

== Death and legacy ==
Wicks died of cancer in Toronto on September 10, 2000, at the age of 73.

From 2001 to 2010, Regional Maple Leaf Communications presented an annual Ben Wicks Award to emerging cartoonists.

In 2007, Wicks's children went to court seeking the return of 2,408 original drawings that had been left behind during a 1992 move. The family won the case, and the court ordered that the drawings be returned.

== Selected works ==
- Ben Wicks' Canada, McClelland and Stewart, Toronto, 1976, ISBN 0-7710-8983-X
- No Time to Wave Goodbye, Stoddart, Toronto, 1988, ISBN 0-7737-2215-7
- The Day They Took the Children, Stoddart, Toronto, 1989, ISBN 0-7737-2333-1
- Waiting for the All Clear, Bloomsbury, London, 1990, ISBN 0-7475-0667-1
- Katie and Orbie Save the Planet, 1991, illustrator, ISBN 1-5501-3322-5
- Dawn of the Promised Land: The Creation of Israel, Stoddart, 1997, ISBN 0-7737-3050-8
