= Kate Newmann =

Irish poet

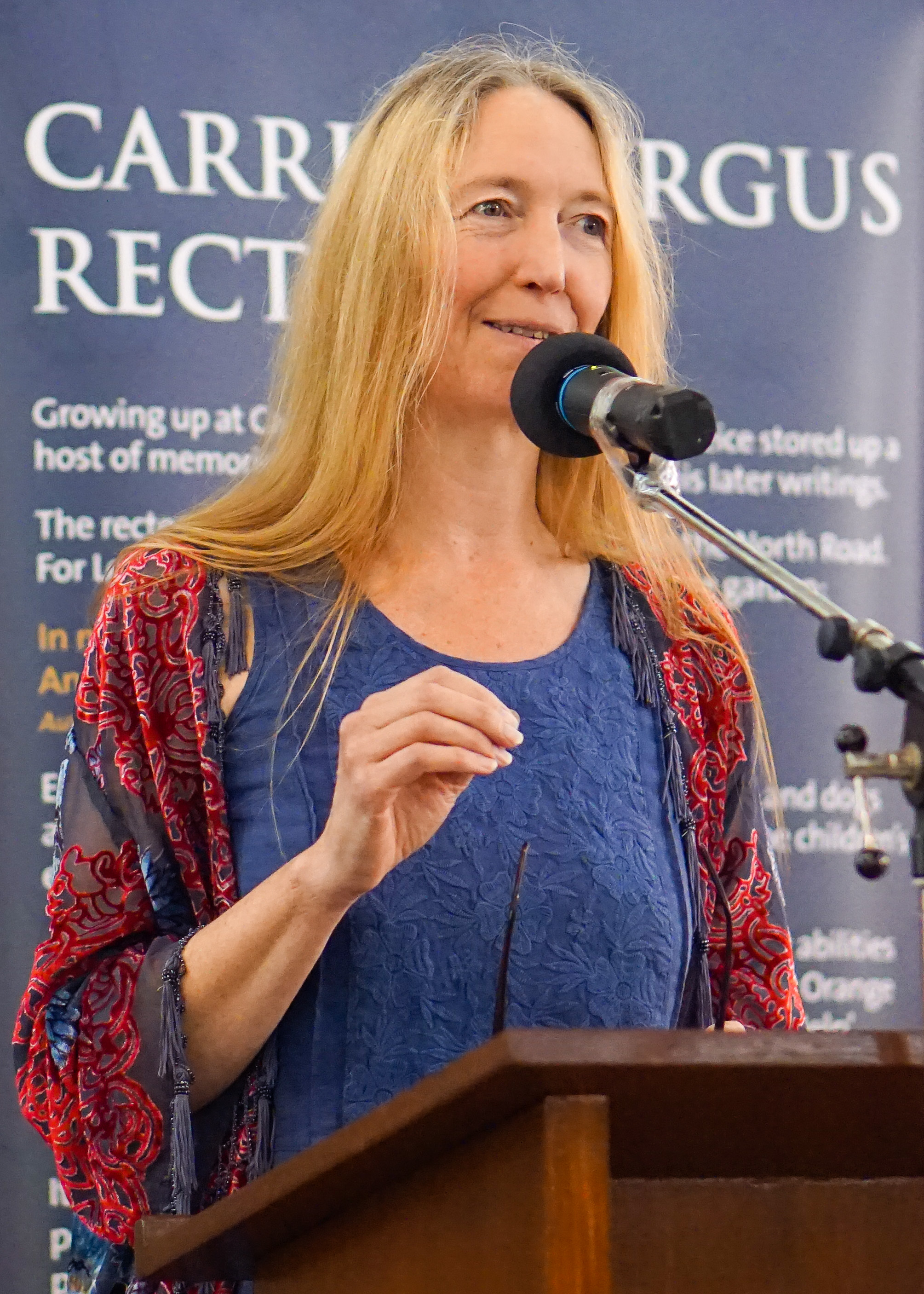
- Kate Newmann in 2014
- Born: 1965 (age 60–61); Dromore, County Down
- Occupation: Poet
- Writing career
- Genre: Poetry

Kate Newmann (born 1965) is an Irish poet and founder of the small poetry press Summer Palace Press.

== Life and work ==
Kate Newmann was born in 1965 in Dromore, County Down. She is the daughter of the poet Joan Newmann. Educated in Cambridge, an English graduate with an MA from King's College, Cambridge she went on to be a junior fellow at the Institute for Irish Studies, Queen's University Belfast. She was the editor and compiler of The Dictionary of Ulster Biography, published in 1993.

She is co-founder, with her mother of the Summer Palace Press, begun in 1999, and lives in Kilcar near Killybegs, Donegal.

== Awards ==
- William Allingham Poetry Award
- The Swansea Award
- The Listowel Festival single poem award.
- Roundyhouse Poetry Prize
- Irish Arts Council Bursary 2007 recipient
- 2008 Commended in the National Poetry Competition
- Patrick and Katherine Kavanagh Trust Fellowship, 2025

Review by John McAuliffe in the Irish Times:

Newmann knows her subjects must not be understood as an exception or aberration: the book's most effective poems are those which struggle into quandaries, linking the Holocaust to a world we recognise.[...] Grim is a challenging book, but there is nothing glib about the way it responds to its historical material.

== Published works ==
- The Dictionary of Ulster Biography (1993)
- Coming of Age(1995)
- Thin Ice (1999)
- The Blind Woman in The Blue House (2001)
- Belongings (2007)
- Grim (2015)
- I am a Horse (2011)
- How Well Did You Love?

== See also ==
Ulster History Circle
