= Doreen Avio =

Ghanaian journalist

Doreen Avio (born Doreen Akeebeh Avio on November 16, 1985, in Navrongo in the Upper East Region) is a Ghanaian entertainment writer, radio and television show host and a Master of Ceremonies who has mounted the stage of major international events. She is a campaigner against gender inequality in Ghana's creative industry, particularly in the network of Disc Jockeys (DJs)

In 2019, she was awarded the Best Achiever in Media (Radio) at the Feminine Ghana Achievers Awards and also the best TV Personality at the Nollywood Entertainment and Leadership Awards in 2019 at the United Kingdom

She was the host of the 2017 Miss Ghana Diaries, the MTN music Festival in 2018 and co-hosted Guinness' Black Shines Brightest campaign.
