= Tower Museum =

Local history museum in Northern Ireland

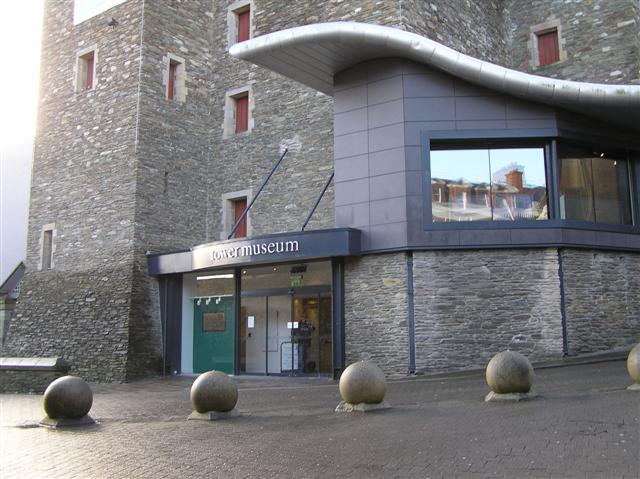
Front entrance of the museum.

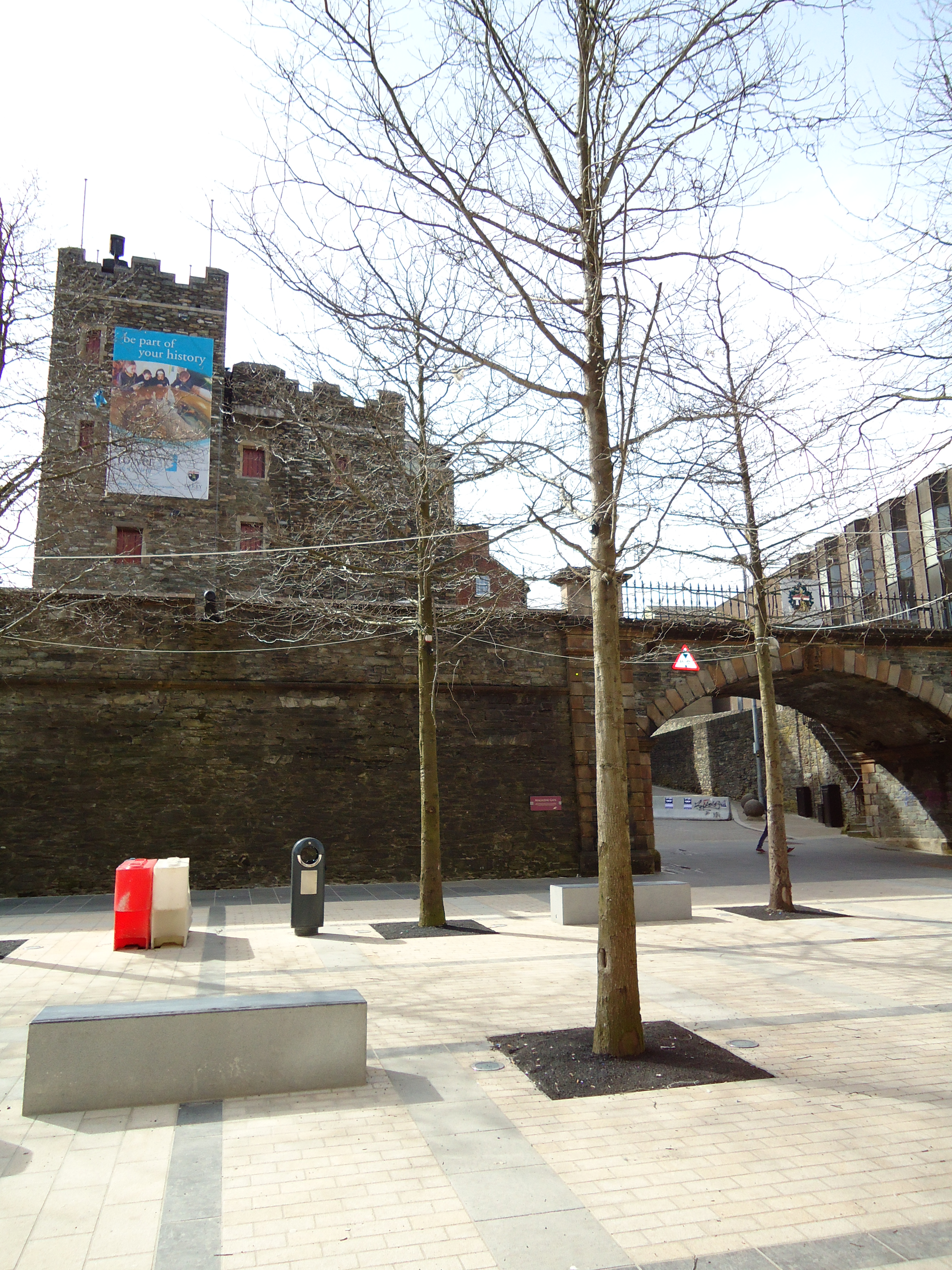
View of the museum and city wall.

The Tower Museum is a museum on local history in Derry, Northern Ireland.

== History ==
The museum opened in 1992 in the presence of Ian Paisley and John Hume. The President of the European Commission Jacques Delors was also invited though eventually pulled out. It was funded by the European Development Fund and the International Fund for Ireland. It was constructed as a public-private partnership and was considered by the Northern Ireland Office to be a flagship project to promote tourism. The local press deemed it as "magnificent".

The museum is located in Union Hall Place, within a historic tower just inside the city walls, near the Guildhall. The museum has two permanent exhibits; The Story of Derry which presents the history of Derry from its prehistoric origins to the present, and An Armada Shipwreck – La Trinidad Valencera which details the local shipwreck from the Spanish Armada. The Spanish Armada exhibits were split between the Tower Museum and Ulster Museum in Belfast. The Tower Museum is the home of the Mabel Colhoun collection. The top of the museum has an open air viewing facility, which provides views of the city centre and the River Foyle.

In 2021, a maquette of the Hands Across the Divide was purchased by the Derry and Strabane District Council and they chose to display it at the Tower Museum. The Museum also has temporary exhibits throughout the year. The Tower Museum's record attendance came in 2023 when it had an exhibit on the television programme Derry Girls.

== Closure ==
In 2025, work began on its replacement, the DNA Museum, and Tower Museum public access was reduced.

== Recognition ==
The Tower Museum has won a number of awards. It has a permanent exhibit that covers the history of the city.

== See also ==
- List of museums in Northern Ireland
