= Grugies =

- Commune
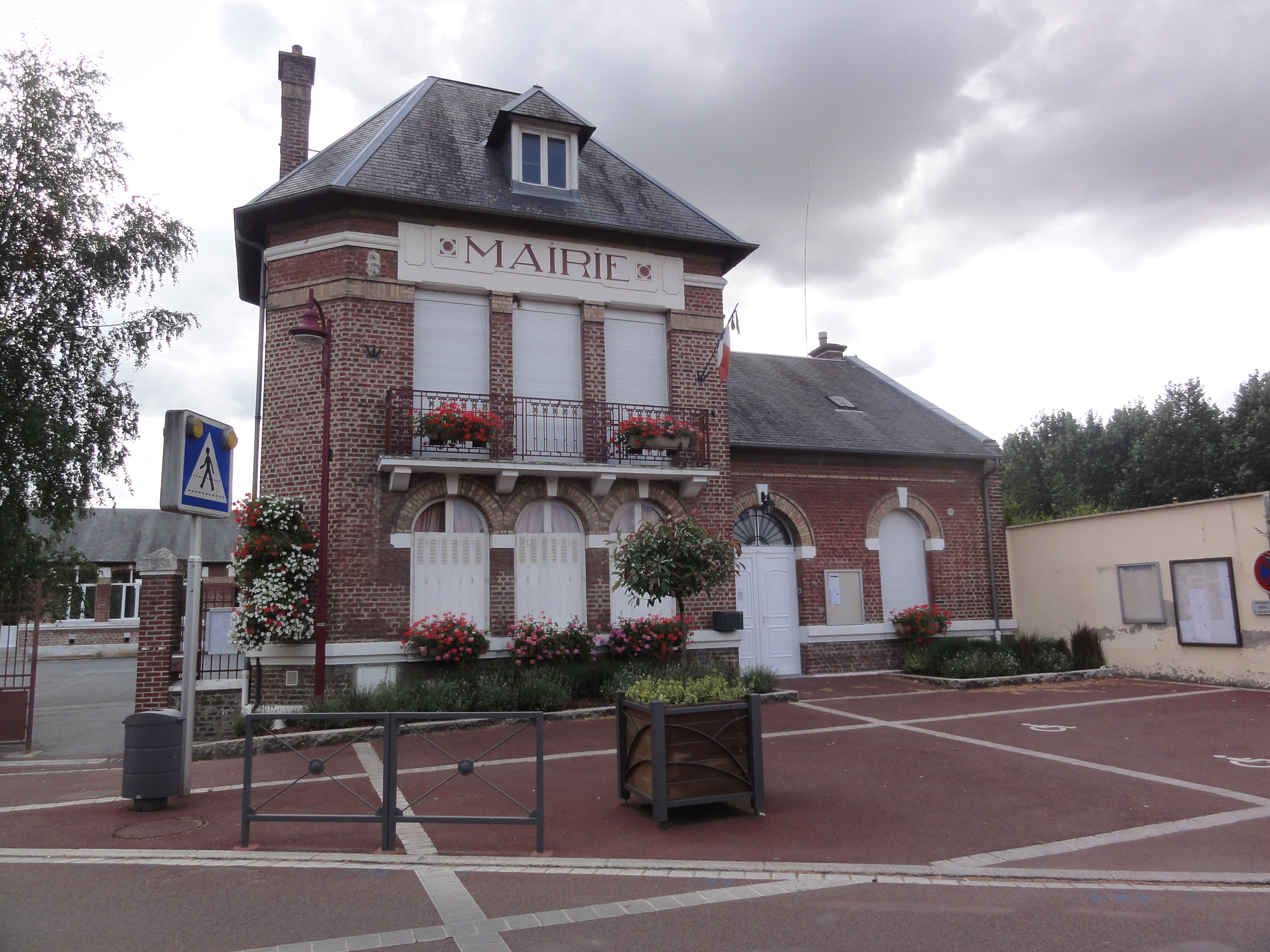
- The town hall of Grugies
- Location of Grugies
- Location within France Location within Hauts-de-France
- Coordinates: 49°48′50″N 3°16′01″E
- Country: France
- Region: Hauts-de-France
- Department: Aisne
- Arrondissement: Saint-Quentin
- Canton: Saint-Quentin-3
- Intercommunality: CA Saint-Quentinois

Government
  - Mayor (2026–32): Fany Fontaine
- Area^{1}: 5.08 km^{2} (1.96 sq mi)
- Elevation: 62 m (203 ft)
- Highest elevation: 111 m (364 ft)
- Lowest elevation: 68 m (223 ft)
- Population (2023): 1,280
  - Density: 252/km^{2} (653/sq mi)
- Time zone: UTC+01:00 (CET)
  - Summer (DST): UTC+02:00 (CEST)
- INSEE/Postal code: 02359 /02680
- ^{1} French Land Register data, which excludes lakes, ponds, glaciers > 1 km^{2} (0.386 sq mi or 247 acres) and river estuaries.

Grugies (French pronunciation: [ɡʁyʒi]) is a commune in the Aisne department in Hauts-de-France in northern France.

== Population ==
Historical population
Year	Pop.	±% p.a.
1968	747	—
1975	793	+0.86%
1982	815	+0.39%
1990	948	+1.91%
1999	906	−0.50%
2007	873	−0.46%
2012	1,162	+5.89%
2017	1,355	+3.12%
2023	1,280	−0.94%
Source: INSEE

== See also ==
- Communes of the Aisne department
