= Doreen Alhadeff =

American real estate agent

Doreen Alhadeff (born c. 1950) is an American real estate agent. In 2016, she became the first American Jew to be granted Spanish citizenship under the 2015 Spanish law that created a time window for Sephardic Jews, to reclaim Spanish citizenship. In 2022, Spain granted her the Order of Isabella the Catholic, "in honor of her demonstrated loyalty in furthering Spain's relations with the Americas," for her work helping other Sephardic Jews through the citizenship restoration process.

== Early life and education ==
Alhadeff was born Seattle, Washington She was a Spanish major at the University of Washington; she also studied at the University of Madrid and at New York University's program in Madrid. She currently lives in Seattle.

== Activism ==
Alhedeff's work in helping people acquire Spanish citizenship consisted not only of helping people with the application process, but of lobbying successfully for a waiver for people under 18 or over 70 of the requirement to pass an exam in modern Spanish. While this requirement was trivial for Latin Americans, most North American Sephardim spoke English and Ladino (Judaeo-Spanish), more akin to Old Spanish.

Alhadeff founded the Seattle Sephardic Network in 2013. Besides giving assistance to Sephardic Jews in reclaiming Spanish or Portuguese citizenship, the organization also organizes cultural programs and events. The U.S. named Alhadeff as ambassador to the Red de Juderías de España (literally "Network of Jewish Quarters of Spain").

== Personal life ==
Alhadeff's paternal grandmother Dora Levy arrived in Seattle in 1906 and was the first known Sephardic Jewish woman in Seattle's now 5000-strong Sephardic community, the third-largest Sephardic population of any U.S. city. Dora spoke about half a dozen languages and was able to communicate and help newcomers to settle in the community.

Alhadeff is a member of Congregation Ezra Bessaroth, a Sephardic congregation that maintains the liturgy and customs of the Mediterranean Island of Rhodes. By Alhadeff's own description, although she grew up in, and attends, this Orthodox Jewish congregation, she and her family "were never Orthodox." They observed the Jewish holidays, but their connection to Judaism was "much more cultural."

Alhadeff and her husband Joseph Alhadeff are married in 1973 and have two sons.
