= Doreen Main =

Scottish plant geneticist

Doreen (Dorrie) S. Main is a Scottish bioinformatics researcher and plant scientist specializing in genomics and plant genetics. She is a professor of bioinformatics in the Department of Horticulture at Washington State University.

== Education ==
Main is originally from Scotland. She earned a bachelor's degree in Science and Industrial Studies at Edinburgh Napier University, and went on to graduate study at the University of Strathclyde, where she earned a master's degree in Information Management before completing her Ph.D. in Bioscience and Biotechnology.

== Career ==
She moved to Clemson University in the US as a postdoctoral researcher, and continued on there as director of bioinformatics and assistant professor of genetics and biochemistry. In 2005 she moved to her present position at Washington State University. She has served two terms as interim chair of the Department of Horticulture since 2019.
