= Doreen Lindsay =

Canadian photographer

- Born: 1934 (age 91–92); London, Ontario
- Known for: Photography
- Spouse: Gabor Szilasi

Doreen Lindsay (1934) is a Canadian artist known for her photography.

== Early life and education ==
Lindsay received a certificate in Fine Arts, Instituto Allende, Mexico in 1957. from Sir George Williams University, Montreal, she earned a Bachelor of Fine Arts degree in 1965, followed by a master's degree in art education in 1969.

Lindsay married the photographer Gabor Szilasi (1965) whom she had encouraged and to whom she taught the basics of printing photography.

== Collections ==
Her work is included in the collections of the Musée national des beaux-arts du Québec the National Gallery of Canada, and the Library and Archives Canada.
