= Doreen Wicks =

British-born Canadian nurse and humanitarian

Doreen Mary Wicks, CM OOnt (née Curtis; 1935 – March 1, 2004) was a Canadian nurse, humanitarian and Citizenship Judge. Her husband was the cartoonist Ben Wicks.

Born in Bristol, England, she moved to Canada with her husband in 1957, settling in Calgary. In 1982, she founded Global Ed-Med Supplies (Canada) Inc. or Gems of Hope, a Canadian charity helping marginalized women in developing countries, and was the Executive Director. In 1989, the charity donated a series of medical shipments to Human Concern International's branch in Peshawar, following a plea by Ahmed Khadr.

In 1997, she was appointed a Citizenship Judge, and reappointed in 1998.

== Awards ==
In 1989, she was made a Member of the Order of Canada. Her husband was made a Member of the Order of Canada in 1986 making them one of the few married couples appointed to the Order at different times.

== Death ==
She died in Toronto in 2004, aged 68.
