= Doreen Corcoran =

Northern Irish historian

- Born: Doreen Luney; 12 July 1934; Carrickfergus, County Antrim, Northern Ireland
- Died: 3 August 2013 (aged 79)

Doreen Corcoran (12 July 1934 – 3 August 2013) was a Northern Irish local historian.

== Early life ==
Doreen Corcoran was born Doreen Luney on 12 July 1934 in Carrickfergus, County Antrim. Her parents were William and Roberta Luney (née Robinson). She was the eldest with two brothers and a sister. The family lived in Greenisland, County Antrim. She was educated at the local primary school, and attended the Methodist College Belfast from September 1944, winning prizes in history and English. When she sat the United Kingdom Civil Service Commission examinations in 1953, she got the highest results in Northern Ireland. Working in the civil service in London, she met and married John Xavier Wellington Patrick Corcoran (1926–1975), who was an archaeology PhD student of Irish heritage. As a student of T. G. E. Powell, he became a specialist on Irish megalithic monuments, and was a lecturer in the University of Glasgow from 1961. He died in May 1975.

== Historical work ==
Travelling with her husband to conferences and on digs, Corcoran developed wide interests in archaeology and history. She returned to live in Carrickfergus with her two daughters after the death of her husband. There she worked in the local library and in Hopefield School. Corcoran was a founding member of the Carrickfergus and District Historical Society and went on to serve in all of the honorary offices of the Society. She was made life president in 1996. She conducted historical walking tours of Carrickfergus, and published A tour of east Antrim in 1996 illustrated with photographs by W. A. Green from a collection held in the Ulster Folk and Transport Museum.

Corcoran joined the Federation for Ulster Local Studies in 1978, serving on the committee, and later as secretary and then chair from 1988 to 1990. From 1987 to 2000, she researched and compiled 26 editions of Local History Link, a biannual roundup of local historical society events. She was an earlier advocate for cross border projects between Northern Irish and Irish communities. Through her work, she created and maintained links between the Ulster Federation and the Federation of Local History Societies across the border in Ireland. The federations partnered for meetings and conferences, and occasionally trips to Europe that Corcoran was involved with at all levels. She published numerous articles in journals and newspapers, as well as appearing on television and radio. In 2008, she became honorary vice-president of the Ulster Federation.

She was invited to join the Ulster History Circle by James Hawthorne, going on to serve as chair from 1998 to 2009, organising and speaking at numerous plaque unveilings across Northern Ireland. From 1994 to 2000, she was a member of the Historic Buildings Council and the Historic Monuments Council. She was a member of the Ulster Archaeological Society, as well as a trustee for both the Ulster Historical Foundation and of the Ulster History Trust. For her contributions to Ulster history and heritage, she was awarded an MBE in 2009. Corcoran died on 3 August 2013.
