= Doreen Davies =

British radio producer

Doreen Mary Davies (13 January 1928 – 20 August 2020) was a British radio producer and broadcasting executive, who eventually rose to be head of BBC Radio 1.
