= Socialism in Canada =

Socialism has a long history as one of the primary political forces in Canada, along with conservatism and liberalism, particularly since the twentieth century. Socialism first gained momentum in Western Canada, with the Socialist Labor Party formed in 1898 in Vancouver, and the Socialist Party of British Columbia formed in 1901. The Socialist Party of Canada, founded in 1904, was the first Canadian-wide socialist party. The 1919 Winnipeg General Strike and the Great Depression, which lasted from approximately 1929 to 1939, are considered to have fueled the socialist movement in Canada.

Historically, Canada's most influential socialist party was the Co-operative Commonwealth Federation (CCF). In 1944, the Saskatchewan CCF formed the first nominally socialist government in Canada and held power until 1964. The New Democratic Party (NDP) was founded in 1961 as a merger of the CCF and the Canadian Labour Congress, with former Saskatchewan Premier Tommy Douglas as its leader. While the NDP has never won a federal election, its provincial affiliates have taken power in six of ten provinces. The preamble of the NDP's original constitution described it as a socialist party, but in 2013 the word was removed from the constitution.

== History ==
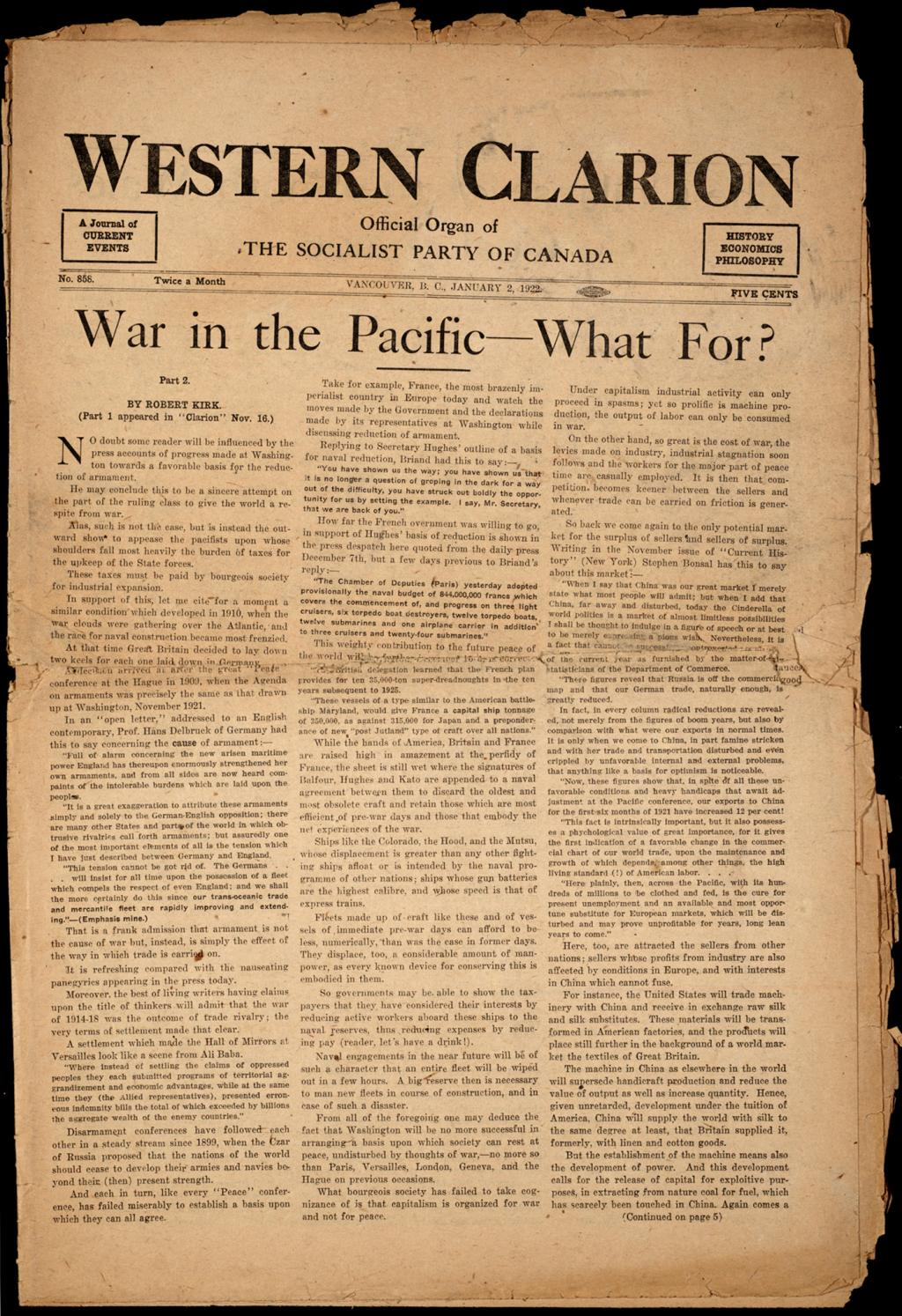
Western Clarion, official newspaper of the Socialist Party of Canada, 2 January 1922

=== Early 20th century ===
The Socialist Labor Party was Canada's first socialist party, formed in 1898 by Canadian supporters of the ideas of American socialist Daniel De Leon and the Socialist Labor Party of America. It became a national party in the 1930s and had its headquarters in Toronto. The party ran only a small number of candidates, all of whom placed last in their respective elections.

The Socialist Party of Canada (SPC) was founded in 1904 and was led by E. T. Kingsley. The SPC published the Western Clarion newspaper. The party was founded at the Socialist Party of British Columbia's 4th annual convention in December 1904. It elected MLAs in BC, Alberta, and Manitoba between 1904 and 1922. The SPC was also instrumental in setting up One Big Union in 1919. As a result of the Russian Revolution and the Winnipeg General Strike, a number of the SPC's supporters became attracted to Bolshevism and the ideas of Vladimir Lenin and Leon Trotsky and subsequently joined the Communist Party. The SPC disbanded in 1925. A new party bearing the Socialist Party name was resurrected in 1931 and has operated continuously since.

=== Communism ===
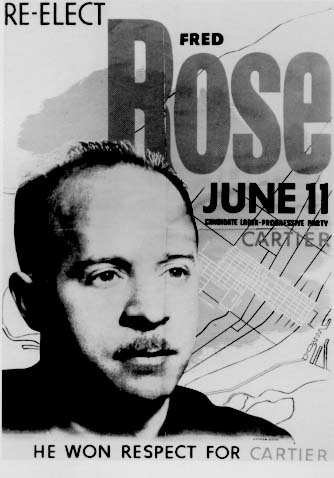
1945 election poster for Fred Rose, the first Communist MP

The Communist Party of Canada (CPC) was founded in 1921 and is the oldest active socialist party in Canada, and the second oldest active political party in the country. The party was founded in Guelph by a group of Marxist activists led by William Moriarty. During the early years of their existence, the party's membership faced persecution and arrest for their political activities. During the Great Depression, the CPC experienced a surge in popularity, becoming influential in various labour unions and having Fred Rose elected as a Member of Parliament. In 1935, communists gained notoriety for organizing the young inmates of Depression relief camps into the Relief Camp Workers' Union to resist the poor conditions of the camps, as well as a massive march of unemployed workers known as the On-to-Ottawa Trek. After the trek, the communists were instrumental in organizing over 1,500 Canadians to fight in the Spanish Civil War. Joined by volunteers of other political stripes, the Canadian contingent, known as the Mackenzie–Papineau Battalion, joined the International Brigades to fight for the elected left-wing government of the Second Spanish Republic against the fascist-supported insurgency of General Francisco Franco. Among Canadians in the conflict was Norman Bethune, a surgeon who would invent the world's first mobile medical unit. Bethune was later killed during the Second Sino-Japanese War while aiding the Chinese Communist Party.

By the end of World War II, in the context of the start of the Cold War, the CPC began to lose its momentum. Its only elected federal representative, Rose, was accused of being a Soviet spy as part of the Gouzenko Affair. Rose was expelled from parliament, imprisoned for four years, and then followed by the Royal Canadian Mounted Police (RCMP). Rose eventually moved to Poland with the intention of returning. However, the government revoked Rose's Canadian citizenship in 1957, preventing his return.

=== Democratic socialism ===
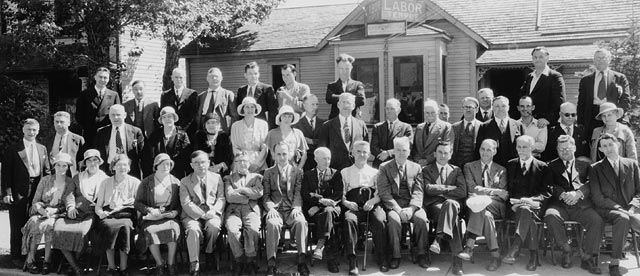
CCF founding meeting in Regina, 1933

The Co-operative Commonwealth Federation (CCF), a democratic socialist party from the Prairies with its origins in the Christian left and social gospel, became the most influential socialist party in Canada after its founding during the Great Depression. It was formed by the merger of several farmer and labour parties and gained support among farmers on the Prairies as well as from many labour unions.

The Saskatchewan CCF became the first socialist party to form government in Canada after the 1944 Saskatchewan election. Led by Tommy Douglas, the CCF governed Saskatchewan until 1964, and is noted for introducing universal healthcare in the province, the precursor to the Canadian system of universal healthcare.

The CCF proved unable to form government at the federal level, but influenced the policies of Mackenzie King's postwar government, including the adoption of old age security and unemployment insurance. In 1961, the CCF joined with the Canadian Labour Congress to form the social democratic New Democratic Party (NDP) under Douglas' leadership. Like the CCF, the NDP continually fell short of forming government, but influenced policy, particularly when holding the balance of power in minority governments, particularly with the Liberal Party in power. For example, the NDP was instrumental in the passage of universal healthcare under Lester Pearson's minority government and the creation of Petro Canada under Pierre Trudeau's minority government. The NDP formed the Official Opposition for the first time after the 2011 federal election on the strength of the "orange wave," or its breakthrough in and near sweep of seats in Quebec. The NDP has formed governments in Alberta, British Columbia, Yukon, Saskatchewan, Manitoba, Ontario, and Nova Scotia.

Quebec's sovereigntist Parti Québécois is considered to be social democratic.

=== Revolutionary socialism ===
Many socialists in Canada have attempted to organize outside the framework of parliamentary politics, to pursue conceptions of socialism that are more radical than the social democratic politics of either the CCF or the NDP.

Some of the radical socialist organizations operating in Canada today include Socialist Action (Canada), the International Socialists, Socialist Alternative, Spring, the Communist League (Canada), Autonomy & Solidarity, and the London Project for a Participatory Society.

== Socialist parties in Canada ==
=== Current parties ===
- The New Democratic Party (NDP) is a federal political party which officially adheres to social democracy. However, some factions of the party remain committed to democratic socialism, including the NDP Socialist Caucus and the New Democratic Youth of Canada. Moreover, the party's leader since 2026, Avi Lewis, was elected on a democratic socialist platform. The policies of the party's provincial and territorial branches have varied in the past from left-wing to third way. The provincial branches of the NDP are:
  - Yukon New Democratic Party (official opposition)
  - British Columbia New Democratic Party (official opposition)
  - Alberta New Democratic Party (official opposition)
  - Saskatchewan New Democratic Party (official opposition)
  - New Democratic Party of Manitoba (governing party)
  - Ontario New Democratic Party (official opposition)
  - Nova Scotia New Democratic Party (official opposition)
  - New Brunswick New Democratic Party (not represented in the legislature)
  - New Democratic Party of Prince Edward Island (not represented in the legislature)
  - New Democratic Party of Newfoundland and Labrador (third party)
- The Communist Party of Canada sees itself as "Canada's party of socialism." With its origins going back to 1921, the CPC is the second oldest existing political party in Canada after the Liberal Party. The Communist Party has active branches in British Columbia, Alberta, Saskatchewan, Manitoba, Ontario, and Quebec. The CPC also has a youth group, known as the Young Communist League of Canada.
- The Communist Party of Canada (Marxist–Leninist) was created in 1971 as a so-called Anti-Revisionist party supportive of Maoism and of Albanian leader Enver Hoxha.
- Québec Solidaire ("Solidarity Quebec") is Quebec's most popular left-wing party. QS promotes the causes of democratic socialism, such as environmentalism, feminism, Quebec Sovereignty, and alter-globalization.
- The Socialist Party of Canada (WSM), founded in 1931, is a companion party of the World Socialist Movement.
- The Revolutionary Communist Party, the Canadian section of the Trotskyist organization called the Revolutionary Communist International (RCI). They are anti-parliamentary and aim to organize workers and young people towards a revolutionary cause.

=== Historical parties ===
Historical leftist parties that have held seats in the House of Commons of Canada and provincial legislatures include:

- The Dominion Labour Party and the Canadian Labour Party, which together helped found the Co-operative Commonwealth Federation in 1932.
- The Ginger Group (1924–1932) was a group of radical MPs of the Progressive Party of Canada, the United Farmers, and Labour.
- The United Farmers were farmer advocacy groups tied to the Progressive Party. In Ontario, the United Farmers of Ontario governed from 1919 to 1924, while the United Farmers of Alberta governed Alberta from 1921 to 1935. The UFA later merged into the CCF.
- Socialist Party of Canada was a name used by two political parties. The first existed from 1905 to 1925 and was created by the Socialist Party of British Columbia; it played an important role in the creation of the CCF. The second has existed since 1931.
- The Labor-Progressive Party was the name used by the Communist Party of Canada from 1941 to 1959 while the Canadian government outlawed the CPC. The LPP elected a member of the House of Commons, and also elected representatives to the Legislative Assembly of Manitoba and the Legislative Assembly of Ontario.
- The Co-operative Commonwealth Federation (1932–1962), known as the CCF, was Canada's most popular left-wing party in the mid-twentieth century. The CCF was formed during the Great Depression by members of the House of Commons Ginger Group, the Progressive Party of Canada, the United Farmer parties in Alberta and Ontario, the Canadian and Dominion Labour Parties, and a social advocacy group known as the League for Social Reconstruction. The CCF went on to form one of Canada's most popular and historically significant provincial governments in the Canadian province of Saskatchewan under Tommy Douglas (1944–1964). Federally, the party never got past third place and in an attempt to broaden their support base the CCF merged with the Canadian Labour Congress to create the NDP.
- The Cape Breton Labour Party was a social democratic party from the province of Nova Scotia represented in the Nova Scotia legislature from 1981 to 1988 by former NDP member Paul MacEwan.
- The New Democratic Party of Quebec was the Quebec wing of the NDP. In 1989, the party ended relations with the federal NDP and in 1994 changed its name to the Parti de la Democratie Socialiste (PDS) or "Socialist Democratic Party". In 2002 PDS joined the Communist Party of Quebec and other far left, sovereigntist parties in an alliance known as the Union des forces progressistes (UFP). In 2006 the UFP became Quebec solidaire.

== See also ==
- Anarchism in Canada
- Conservatism in Canada
- Fascism in Canada
- History of Canada
- History of socialism
- Liberalism in Canada
- Monarchism in Canada
- Politics of Canada
- Republicanism in Canada
