= George Weston Wrigley =

Canadian journalist and social reformer

- Born: 24 June 1847; Wrigley Corners, near Galt, Canada West
- Died: 14 January 1907 (aged 59); Winnipeg, Manitoba, Canada
- Occupations: Teacher; journalist
- Political party: Canadian Socialist League
- Movement: Christian socialism
- Spouse: Edith Wrigley

George Weston Wrigley (1847–1907) was a Canadian journalist and social reformer. He was a believer in the Social Gospel and was an opponent of industrial capitalism, which he blamed for many social ills. He was the editor of several newspapers that promoted reform in the later part of the 19th century.

== Early years ==
George Weston Wrigley was born on 24 June 1847 in Wrigley Corners near Galt, Upper Canada. His parents were Sylvanus Wrigley and Isabella Stoddard. He was educated in local schools and became a teacher in Brant and Waterloo counties. He was promoted to school principal, working in London (Ontario) and Wallaceburg schools. Wrigley became a journalist in the early 1880s. He was editor in turn of the Wallaceburg Valley Record and the Drumbo Record. Wrigley's parents were Presbyterian, but his views evolved to a more liberal, Social Gospel position. Wrigley was Anglican.

His wife Sarah bore him three sons. At least one of them, G. Weston Wrigley, worked with him in his newspaper work.

Sarah Wrigley became a leader of the Woman's Christian Temperance Union.

== Canada Labour Courier ==
By the early 1880s Wrigley was attracted to journalism and his first venture was quite naturally in the educational field. George Wrigley founded the Canada Labour Courier in 1886 in St. Thomas, Ontario. The paper supported the Canadian branch of the Knights of Labor. This organization had over 250 labour assemblies in Ontario at the time. It believed that the working people should be organized, educated, and directed. It was idealistic and trade-unionist, but was also conservative and generally opposed to strikes. The Canada Labour Courier failed in June 1887. Wrigley was an organizer and speaker in many reform movements, but earned his living as a journalist. He wrote for the London Advertiser, the Toronto Globe, and the Toronto Daily Mail and Empire.

== Canada Farmers' Sun ==
In 1892 Wrigley founded the Canada Farmers' Sun in London, supporting the Ontario Patrons of Industry, a rapidly growing agrarian reform movement. The Patrons were not a political party, but had political goals. They wanted a smaller and simpler government, abolition of railway subsidies and reduced reciprocal tariffs. They also wanted laws against cartels and monopolies.

In 1893 Wrigley agreed to devote three pages of his paper to the Patrons in return for their financial assistance. In May 1894 the paper moved to offices in the Evening Star building in Toronto. In 1895 the Patrons bought a 50 per cent share of the paper, which claimed to have a circulation of 30,000. The paper gave extensive coverage to the Patrons, but also covered many other reform movements and proposals. It avoided religious controversy, but clearly took the Social Gospel position that the value of Christianity lay in practical deeds.

Wrigley thought the capitalist, industrial society with its monopolies and tariffs were unfair and immoral, far from the ethics presented in the Sermon on the Mount. Giving a personal but appealing view of history, he wrote, "When the act of Confederation was adopted it was supposed that Canada was being furnished with a proper form of government; that is, a government of the people, by the people, for the people. Instead of this we have a government of the people, by the representatives, for the classes who can pull strings." To counter the "interests" farmers and labour had to organize and unite. He wrote, "When capital finds one victim it gloats over the fallen foe, and immediately casts its meshes over the heads of new victims. When workingmen are defeated, farmers must fall with them and share their fate." Wrigley was in the centre of the negotiations to create a coalition of the Patrons and the Trades and Labor Congress of Canada.

The Patrons won 16 seats in the 1894 provincial elections in Ontario, but this proved to be a high point. In 1895–96 Wrigley published a paper named Brotherhood Era, which he also inserted as a supplement in the Sun. It was aimed at urban readers, and concentrated on the injustice of industrial capitalism, supporting causes such as the single tax, (Note: Wrigley, however, did not support the single-tax proposals himself.) the eight-hour day, and equal suffrage, and opposing militarism. By April 1896 the Sun was in financial difficulties, with declining circulation. Wrigley was replaced as editor by Goldwin Smith. In the 1896 federal elections internal dissensions appeared among the Patrons, who only won three seats. On he whole, farmers had not been won over to the radical ideals expressed in the Canada Farmers' Sun, and continued to support the traditional parties. Wrigley was a correspondent of the Canada Farmers' Sun until early in 1898, when his last ties were cut.

== Citizen and Country ==
In late 1897 Wrigley founded Citizen and Country, incorporating a sheet named Social Justice that had been founded in the 1870s. The newspaper gradually became openly socialist. Edith Wrigley (1879–1964), Wrigley's daughter-in-law wife, edited the women's column in Citizen and Country. She was also active in the Woman's Christian Temperance Union. In her column "The Kingdom of the Home" she expressed the maternal feminist position that love and purity, the values of the home, should also become the guiding principles of politics.

The Canadian Socialist League (CSL) was formed in Montreal in 1898 by former members of the Socialist Labor Party. Support for the league appeared about the same time in the summer of 1899 in Montreal and Toronto. In Ontario the CSL was organized by Wrigley and Thomas Phillips Thompson, both former Knights of Labor, in an effort to pull together the reform forces that had become fragmented after the Patrons of Industry were defeated in the 1896 federal election. Wrigley became organizing secretary of the CSL.

Wrigley dominated the league with his Christian socialism. He said socialism was applied Christianity. On 11 March 1899 he wrote in an editorial,

The multitude of social reformers in Canada are men and women who believe that the Church itself was the first Socialist body; that its Head and Founder was the first Socialist; that from Him we receive our inspiration as Social Reformers; and that unless we recognize His teachings and obey the laws of Brotherhood given to us by Him we cannot be true Socialists.

Although he smoked, Wrigley disapproved of smoking at socialist meetings since the "vile odour of smoke of cheap tobacco" discouraged women from attending. He wrote, "Not long ago an Italian lady comrade was criticized for not attending the Italian Branch meetings, the critic being one who had attended these meetings and probably helped to fill the hall with clouds of tobacco smoke ... The average smoker is about as selfish as a hog in a trough of hog swill." Wrigley approved of the Finnish locals, which were against smoking or drinking at their meetings since they wanted women and children to feel welcome to attend.

== Later career ==
In the summer of 1899 Wrigley visited British Columbia by way of the prairies, and found an active social reform movement in the west of Canada. He decided to move there. In 1901 the Socialist Party of British Columbia was formed, allied with the Socialist Party of America. Hermon F. Titus, editor of the Seattle Socialist, helped organize this more radical group. He said that Wrigley "stood for capitalistic thought, for compromise and for pasturage on both sides of the fence."

Richard Parmater Pettipiece had been publishing the Lardeau Eagle, a miners' journal that supported the Socialist League. In 1902 he bought an interest in the Citizen and Country. Starting in July 1902 the journal began appearing in Vancouver with Wrigley's help as the Canadian Socialist. The Canadian Socialist was aligned with the Canadian Socialist League. Wrigley's son, G. Weston Wrigley, had been taking an increasingly active role at the Citizen and Country and continued to help with the Canadian Socialist. (He was also active in the Proportional Representation Committee of Ontario, helping produce the book "Effective Voting - The Basis of Good Municipal Government" (Toronto, 1898).) In October 1902 Pettipiece renamed the paper the Western Socialist.

George Wrigley had moved to Vancouver Island by September 1902 where he helped organize the American Labor Union and worked for the Western Socialist. He drew a clear distinction between union activity and politics, writing in the Western Socialist of 28 February 1903, "Trades unions are purely economic organizations aiming to improve the economic conditions of the members here and now. As organizations they have no business in politics beyond teaching their members the necessity of voting for their class interests and the absurdity of the 'community of interests' between capital and labor". The paper merged with the Clarion of Nanaimo and the Strike Bulletin of the United Brotherhood of Railway Employees (UBRE) and appeared as the Western Clarion on 8 May 1903.

George Wrigley suffered a series of strokes in 1904. That year he was involved in the decision of the Ontario branch of the Canadian Socialist League to join the Socialist Party of Canada, which was established early in 1905. Wrigley was supported by Thomas Phillips Thompson in this effort. The family moved to Winnipeg, Manitoba, in September 1905, where a son was working. Wrigley died in Winnipeg on 14 January 1907, aged 59.
