= Results of the 1904 Canadian federal election =

1904 Canadian federal election

== Results by Province and Territory ==
=== British Columbia ===
Results in British Columbia
Party	Seats	Second	Third	Fourth	Votes	%	+/-
Liberals	7	0	0	0	12,458	49.47	
Conservative	0	6	0	0	9,781	38.84	
Socialist	0	0	3	0	1,794	7.12	
Unknown	0	0	2	1	1,151	4.57	
Total	7				25,184	100.0	

=== Manitoba ===
Results in Manitoba
Party	Seats	Second	Third	Votes	%	+/-
Liberals	7	3	0	23,909	49.68	
Conservative	3	5	0	20,119	41.81	
Independent	0	1	0	2,804	5.83	
Labour	0	0	1	1,290	2.68	
Total	10			48,122	100.0	

=== New Brunswick ===
Results in New Brunswick
Party	Seats	Second	Third	Votes	%	+/-
Liberals	7	6	0	37,158	51.04	
Conservative	5	6	0	30,541	41.95	
Liberal–Conservative	1	1	0	4,962	6.82	
Independent Liberal	0	0	1	138	0.19	
Total	13			72,799	100.0	

=== Northwest Territories ===
Results in Northwest Territories
Party	Seats	Second	Third	Votes	%	+/-
Liberals	7	3	0	27,173	58.22	
Conservative	2	7	0	17,612	37.73	
Liberal–Conservative	1	0	0	1,755	3.76	
Unknown	0	0	1	130	0.28	
Independent	0	0	1	6	0.01	
Total	10			46,676	100.0	

=== Nova Scotia ===
Results in Nova Scotia
Party	Seats	Second	Third	Votes	%	+/-
Liberals	18	0	0	54,873	52.94	
Conservative	0	16	3	46,151	44.53	
Independent	0	1	0	1,653	1.59	
Labour	0	0	1	869	0.84	
Independent Liberal	0	0	1	105	0.1	
Total	18			103,651	100.0	

=== Ontario ===
Results in Ontario
Party	Seats	Second	Third	Votes	%	+/-
Liberals	37	44	0	207,816	46.88	
Conservative	44	34	1	205,812	46.43	
Unknown	0	6	2	13,018	2.94	
Liberal–Conservative	3	0	0	9,020	2.03	
Independent Conservative	1	1	0	5,039	1.14	
Independent	1	0	0	2,486	0.56	
Independent Liberal	0	0	1	66	0.01	
Total	86			443,257	100.0	

=== Prince Edward Island ===
Results in Prince Edward Island
Party	Seats	Second	Third	Votes	%	+/-
Conservative	3	1	0	14,986	50.93	
Liberals	1	2	1	14,441	49.07	
Total	4			29,427	100.0	

=== Quebec ===
Results in Quebec
Party	Seats	Second	Third	Votes	%	+/-
Liberals	53	11	0	160,277	57.95	
Conservative	12	50	0	111,500	40.31	
Independent	0	1	1	3,256	1.18	
Nationalist	0	1	0	1,429	0.52	
Unknown	0	0	2	123	0.04	
Total	65			276,585	100.0	

=== Yukon ===
Results in Yukon
Party	Seats	Second	Votes	%	+/-
Conservative	1	0	2,113	58.56	
Liberals	0	1	1,495	41.44	
Total	1		3,608	100.0	
