= United Brotherhood =

United Brotherhood may refer to:

== Religious organizations ==
- Unitas Fratrum, the Moravian Church

== Labor organizations ==
- United Brotherhood of Carpenters and Joiners of England
- United Brotherhood of Carpenters and Joiners of America
- United Brotherhood of Railway Employees
- United Brotherhood of Teamsters
- United Brotherhood of Maintenance of Way Employees and Railway Shop Laborers
- United Brotherhood of Cement Workers
- United Brotherhood of Pulp and Sulphite Workers
- International United Brotherhood of Leather Workers on Horse Goods
- United Brotherhood of Welders, Cutters and Helpers of America

== See also ==
- Railroad brotherhoods
