= Results of the 1911 Canadian federal election =

1911 Canadian federal election

== Results by Province and Territory ==
=== Alberta ===
Results in Alberta
Party	Seats	Second	Third	Votes	%	+/-
Liberals	6	1		37,197	53.32	
Conservative	1	5		26,834	38.46	
Liberal–Conservative		1		2,841	4.07	
Independent			3	2,176	3.12	
Unknown			1	716	1.03	
Total	7			69,764	100.0	

=== British Columbia ===
Results in British Columbia
Party	Seats	Second	Third	Votes	%	+/-
Conservative	7			25,472	58.67	
Liberals		7		16,350	37.66	
Socialist			3	1,592	3.67	
Total	7			43,414	100.0	

=== Manitoba ===
Results in Manitoba
Party	Seats	Second	Third	Votes	%	+/-
Conservative	8	2		40,356	51.94	
Liberals	2	8		34,781	44.77	
Socialist			1	2,325	2.99	
Independent			1	234	0.3	
Total	10			77,696	100.0	

=== New Brunswick ===
Results in New Brunswick
Party	Seats	Second	Votes	%	+/-
Liberals	8	4	37,718	47.7	
Conservative	5	7	34,492	43.62	
Unknown		2	6,862	8.68	
Total	13		79,072	100.0	

=== Nova Scotia ===
Results in Nova Scotia
Party	Seats	Second	Third	Votes	%	+/-
Liberals	9	10		62,427	55.23	
Conservative	9	7	1	50,244	44.46	
Independent			2	351	0.31	
Total	18			113,022	100.0	

=== Ontario ===
Results in Ontario
Party	Seats	Second	Third	Fourth	Votes	%	+/-
Conservative	71	11			257,513	53.58	
Liberals	13	66	2		197,833	41.16	
Unknown		4	1		9,855	2.05	
Independent Conservative	1				7,194	1.5	
Liberal–Conservative	1				4,001	0.83	
Independent		1			2,281	0.47	
Nationalist Conservative		1			1,220	0.25	
Labour				1	463	0.1	
Socialist				1	298	0.06	
Total	86				480,658	100.0	

=== Prince Edward Island ===
Results in Prince Edward Island
Party	Seats	Second	Third	Votes	%	+/-
Conservative	2	2		14,638	51.12	
Liberals	2	1	1	13,998	48.88	
Total	4			28,636	100.0	

=== Quebec ===
Results in Quebec
Party	Seats	Second	Third	Fourth	Votes	%	+/-
Liberals	36	26	1		144,657	44.64	
Conservative	26	33			143,062	44.15	
Labour	1		1		11,638	3.59	
Unknown		2			8,424	2.6	
Independent Conservative	2				5,305	1.64	
Independent			2	1	3,903	1.2	
Nationalist		1			3,533	1.09	
Nationalist Conservative		1			3,179	0.98	
Socialist			1		359	0.11	
Total	65				324,060	100.0	

=== Saskatchewan ===
Results in Saskatchewan
Party	Seats	Second	Third	Votes	%	+/-
Liberals	9	1		52,914	59.44	
Conservative	1	9		34,700	38.98	
Independent			2	1,401	1.57	
Total	10			89,015	100.0	

=== Yukon ===
Results in Yukon
Party	Seats	Second	Votes	%	+/-
Conservative	1		1,285	60.79	
Liberals		1	829	39.21	
Total	1		2,114	100.0	
