= Results of the 1908 Canadian federal election =

1908 Canadian federal election

== Results by Province and Territory ==
=== Alberta ===
Results in Alberta
Party	Seats	Second	Third	Votes	%	+/-
Liberals	4	3		23,100	50.25	
Conservative	2	4		17,498	38.06	
Liberal–Conservative	1			2,935	6.38	
Independent			2	1,696	3.69	
Socialist			1	743	1.62	
Total	7			45,972	100.0	

=== British Columbia ===
Results in British Columbia
Party	Seats	Second	Third	Fourth	Votes	%	+/-
Conservative	5	1			17,503	46.84	
Liberals	2	5			13,412	35.89	
Independent			1	1	3,314	8.87	
Socialist			2		2,649	7.09	
Unknown			1		490	1.31	
Total	7				37,368	100.0	

=== Manitoba ===
Results in Manitoba
Party	Seats	Second	Third	Votes	%	+/-
Conservative	8	2		35,078	51.55	
Liberals	2	8		30,892	45.4	
Socialist			1	1,977	2.91	
Independent			1	100	0.15	
Total	10			68,047	100.0	

=== New Brunswick ===
Results in New Brunswick
Party	Seats	Second	Votes	%	+/-
Liberals	11	2	40,716	53.82	
Conservative	2	11	34,935	46.18	
Total	13		75,651	100.0	

=== Nova Scotia ===
Results in Nova Scotia
Party	Seats	Second	Third	Votes	%	+/-
Liberals	12	5	1	56,638	50.96	
Conservative	5	12		49,452	44.5	
Liberal–Conservative	1			5,048	4.54	
Total	18			111,138	100.0	

=== Ontario ===
Results in Ontario
Party	Seats	Second	Third	Votes	%	+/-
Conservative	46	35	1	227,956	49.31	
Liberals	37	42		207,578	44.9	
Independent	1	2	2	8,236	1.78	
Liberal–Conservative	1	1		6,750	1.46	
Unknown		2		6,264	1.35	
Labour		1	1	3,042	0.66	
Independent Conservative	1	1		1,772	0.38	
Socialist			1	702	0.15	
Total	86			462,300	100.0	

=== Prince Edward Island ===
Results in Prince Edward Island
Party	Seats	Second	Third	Votes	%	+/-
Liberals	3	1		14,496	50.36	
Conservative	1	2	1	14,286	49.64	
Total	4			28,782	100.0	

=== Quebec ===
Results in Quebec
Party	Seats	Second	Third	Votes	%	+/-
Liberals	52	12		150,200	53.05	
Conservative	12	47		111,744	39.47	
Labour	1			7,358	2.6	
Unknown		2		5,516	1.95	
Independent Liberal		2	2	5,104	1.8	
Independent		1	3	3,210	1.13	
Total	65			283,132	100.0	

=== Saskatchewan ===
Results in Saskatchewan
Party	Seats	Second	Third	Votes	%	+/-
Liberals	9	1		33,885	56.6	
Conservative	1	8		22,007	36.76	
Independent Conservative		1		3,542	5.92	
Independent			1	347	0.58	
Independent Liberal			1	87	0.15	
Total	10			59,868	100.0	

=== Yukon ===
Results in Yukon
Party	Seats	Second	Third	Fourth	Votes	%	+/-
Unknown		1	1		1,208	49.01	
Liberals	1				992	40.24	
Conservative				1	265	10.75	
Total	1				2,465	100.0	
