= Maternal feminism =

Combination of the concepts of maternalism and feminism

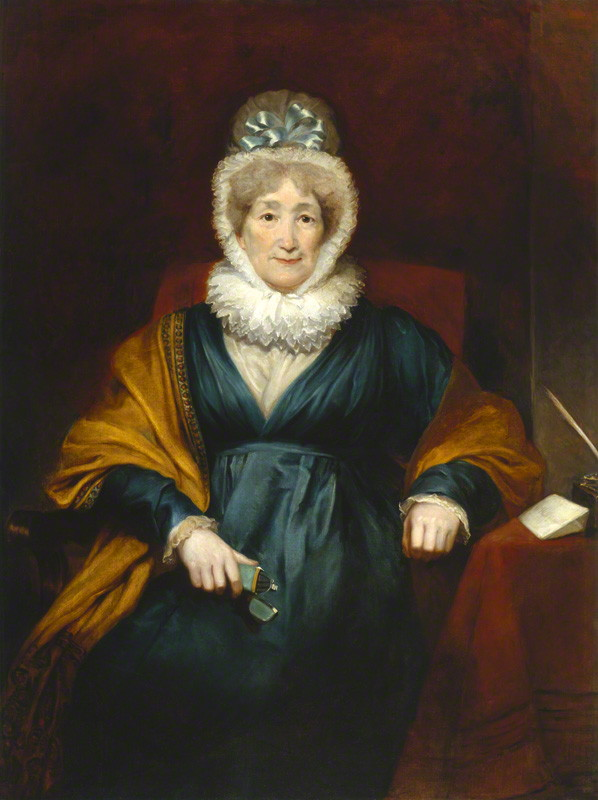
Hannah More (1745–1833), an early exponent of maternal feminism

Maternal feminism is the belief of many early feminists that women as mothers and caregivers had an important but distinctive role to play in society and in politics. It incorporates reform ideas from social feminism, and combines the concepts of maternalism and feminism. It was a widespread philosophy among well-to-do women in the British Empire, particularly Canada, from the late 19th century until after World War I (1914–18). The concept was attacked by later feminists as accepting the paternalist view of society and providing an excuse for inequality.

== Early years ==
Christina Hoff Sommers, a critic of late 20th century feminism, has defined maternal feminism as a "recognition that the sexes are equal but different." Sommers contrasts the "egalitarian feminism" of Mary Wollstonecraft (1759–1797) to the maternal feminism of Hannah More (1745–1833). Wollstonecraft thought, "men and women were essentially the same in their spirits and souls, deserving of the same rights." According to Sommers, "Hannah [More] met women where they were. She believed there was a feminine nature and that women were caring and nurturing, different from men but deserving of equality." More was very popular in her day, but if she is remembered now it is for accepting and rationalizing the patriarchal system of her day.

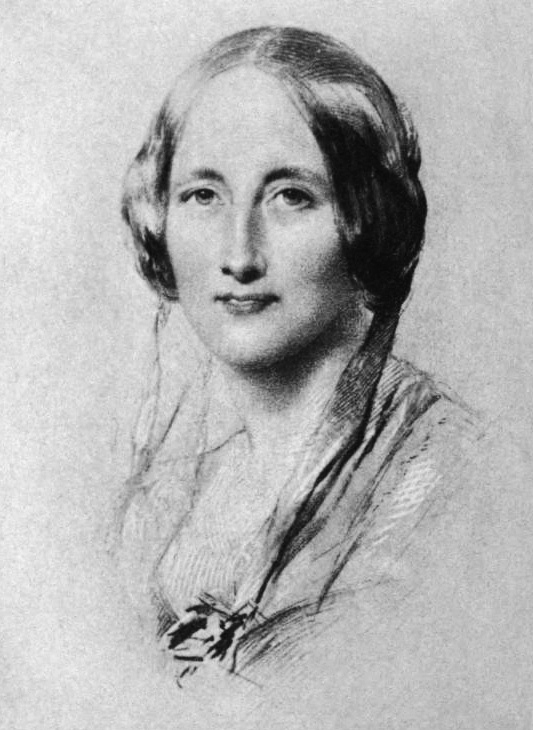
Elizabeth Gaskell (1810–1865)

The conservative English authors Frances Trollope (1779–1863) and Elizabeth Gaskell (1810–65) both thought that women should be better educated so they would be less dependent on men. Trollope thought that financially secure women should go beyond providing moral education to their children, and should express in public their maternal values, social concerns and caring outlook. Her novels repeatedly show how a young heroine can improve a corrupt society through her moral influence. To some early feminists, such as the novelist Fanny Fern (1811–72) and the temperance leader Letitia Youmans (1827–96), maternal feminism was simply a strategy through which women could achieve their goal of equal rights.

In the United States, women became active in social reform in the early 1830s, but were constrained by traditional concepts of maternal feminism. When the Female Moral Reform Society (FMRS) was founded in 1834 there was considerable criticism of the fact that respectable women were discussing prostitution. The protofeminism of this society was lost as it evolved into a charity running homes for reformed prostitutes. The Woman's Christian Temperance Union (WCTU), the largest women's organization in the US by the 1880s, provided an opportunity for women to participate in causes such as prison reform, labor conditions, education, purity and suffrage. However, the WCTU saw women purely as wives and mothers, accepting the constraints of maternal feminism.

== Related movements ==
Maternal feminism reached its peak at a time when the British Empire was still expanding fast, but new ideas about women's suffrage, temperance, pacifism and socialism were in the air. Talking of this period Veronica Strong-Boag (b. 1947) said, "Women themselves, like virtually everyone else in Canadian society, identified their sex with a maternal role. A re-invigorated motherhood, the natural occupation for virtually all women, could serve as a buttress against all the destabilizing elements in Canada."

The growth of maternal feminism at the expense of the new woman in Britain and her colonies may have been due in part to the rapid expansion of the British empire after 1870. The British birth rate seemed to be falling while the infant mortality rate was rising. There was concern about a shortage of Britons "to fill the empty spaces of the empire." To ensure an adequate supply of people of English descent, women were flooded with propaganda that urged them to become "mothers of the race" by having more children, a superior purpose that was embraced by many feminists. Racism and imperialism thus contributed to support for maternal feminism.

Edith Wrigley (1879–1964), wife of George Weston Wrigley (1847–1907), edited the women's column in Citizen and Country, a newspaper that supported the Canadian Socialist League (CSL). She was also active in the Woman's Christian Temperance Union. In her column "The Kingdom of the Home" Wrigley expressed the maternal feminist position that love and purity, the values of the home, should also become the guiding principles of politics. Margaret Haile ran in the 1902 provincial election for the CSL in North Toronto. She was said to be the first woman in the British Empire to compete in a political election. She also "still clung to the notion of the home as a traditional source of woman's power". Ruth Lestor became known as the first lady socialist lecturer in Canada during a speaking tour for the SPC in 1909–11. She sometimes used maternal feminist rhetoric when calling women to become socialist. This did not reflect her underlying belief in complete sexual equality.

In the 19th and early 20th centuries there were strong ties between maternal feminism and the suffrage and temperance movements, both of which aimed to improve the conditions of women and children at home and at work. There was also a natural link between pacifism and maternal feminism. Augusta Stowe-Gullen (1857–1943) said in 1915 that "when women have a voice in national and international affairs, war will cease forever." This became an increasingly hard position to support as World War I dragged on. Some who stayed true to maternal feminism and pacifism during the war were also socialist or communist, such as the Canadian Gertrude Richardson. Rose Henderson (1871–1937) was another Canadian socialist and peace activist who embraced maternal feminism. Their radicalism gave ammunition to opponents of feminism.

== Theory and practice ==
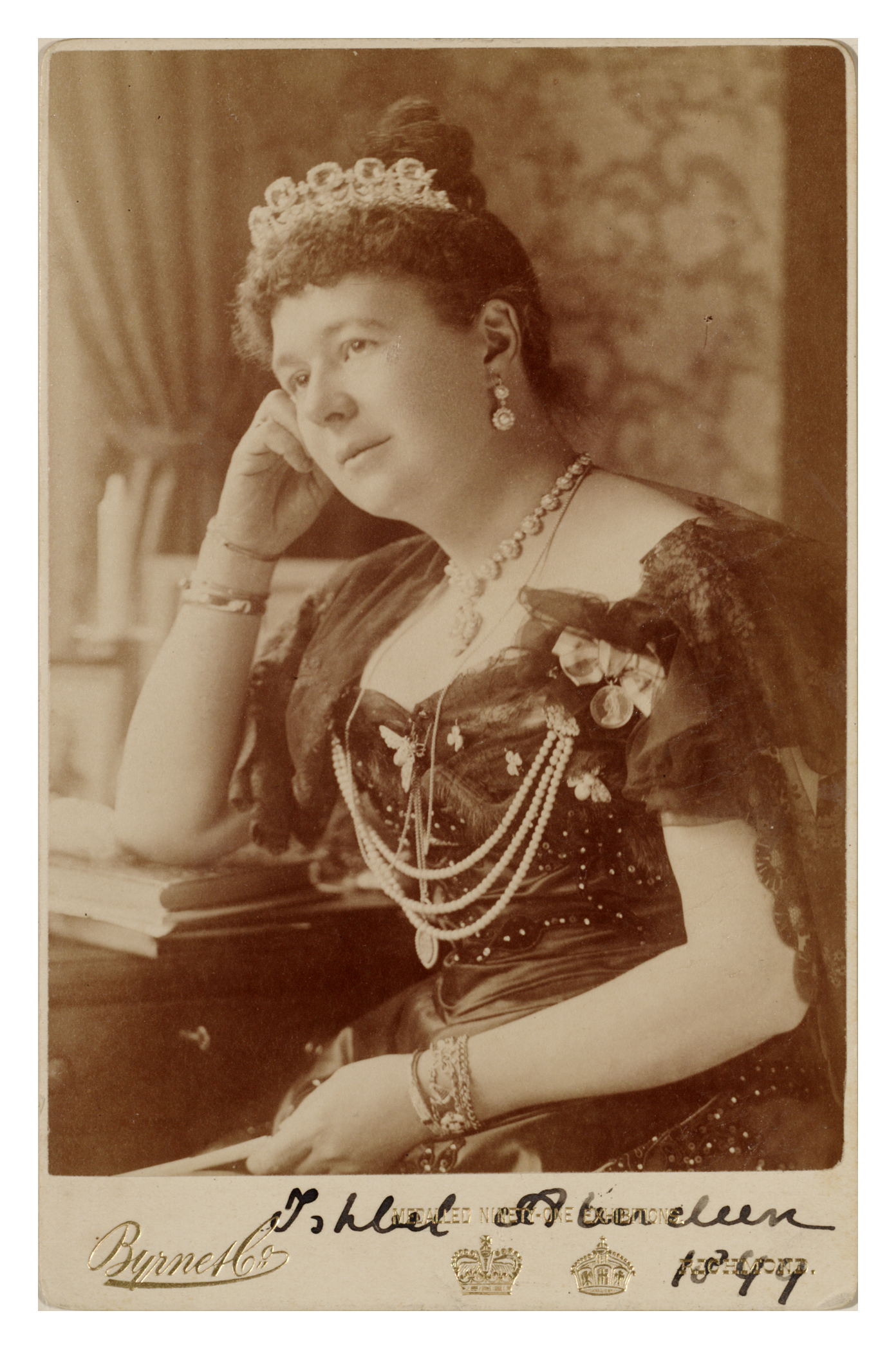
Lady Aberdeen, head of the National Council of Women of Canada

Maternal feminism combines the concepts of maternalism and feminism. Many of the maternalist reformers and organizations like the Elizabeth Fry Society and the Salvation Army did not identify themselves as feminist, and pursued strategies and objectives that were different from those of feminists. Maternalism appealed to bourgeois women interested in reforming the lower orders, and provided the excuse for intrusive surveillance of working-class women and girls. It was not in itself feminist in any way. There also were different types of feminist. The "new women" or "equal rights" feminists did not accept maternalism. But the acceptable language of maternalism was tactically convenient to feminists who were willing to accept being locked into activities surrounding the home and family in return for other freedoms.

The ideology of Maternal feminism incorporates ideas from social feminism and domestic feminism. Social feminists were more concerned with social reform than with women's rights, but felt that women should be able to play a public role in social reform due to their nature as women. Domestic feminism claimed that women should have more autonomy within the family. It did not go further since women were prohibited any form of participation in public life. Combining the two gives the concept that "women's special role as mother gives her the duty and the right to participate in the public sphere." Maternal feminists did not see maternalism as being limited to biological maternity. They extended it to social or spiritual motherhood, and saw no reason why a woman should not remain single and devote herself to a professional career or to social causes.

Ellen Key (1849–1926) of Sweden thought motherhood was women's "highest cultural task", and considered that mothers should not work away from home. She was an early advocate of female suffrage, and thought every woman should have complete freedom to follow her individuality. She viewed motherhood as more important than marriage, and so was seen by many feminists of the 1910s as a radical and supporter of sexual liberation.

In Germany there was fierce debate among feminists about how to handle prostitution, seen as the source of venereal diseases and thus a major health problem. Hanna Bieber-Böhm (1851–1910), Anna Pappritz (1861–1939) and Helene Stöcker (1869–1943) advocated different solutions. Bieber-Böhm favoured stronger legal action by the state against the clients of prostitutes. Pappritz and Stöcker were both opposed to state surveillance and control of prostitutes. Pappritz proposed moral education of young people and encouragement of abstinence outside marriage, while Stocker thought that giving women more sexual freedom would eliminate the demand for prostitution. The more nurturing approach of Pappritz may be seen as closest to maternal feminism.

In 1893 Lady Aberdeen (1857–1939), head of the National Council of Women of Canada (NCWC), said mothering was the "grand woman's mission". NCWC delegates pledged to "conserve the highest good of the family and state" but to remain "aloof from issues pertaining to women's rights." The maternal feminism ideology, with its assumption that all women had common interests, prompted many women of the upper and middle classes to look for ways to help poorer women through clubs, unions, settlement houses and so on. Women of the elite such as Elizabeth Cady Stanton (1815–1902) of America and Marguerite Durand (1864–1936) of France felt that with their better education and broader experience they had a natural duty to lead. Often they lacked empathy with the women they were trying to help, refused to cede control to these women and wanted to reform them as well as assist. Ellice Hopkins (1836–1904) exemplifies this attitude when calling in England in 1882 for "the greater utilization of the increasing culture of upper-class women to bring light and higher influence as well as brightness and beauty, to the 'dim populations' of our great factory towns, especially the toiling working women and mother.

Lucy Maud Montgomery (1874–1942), best known as author of Anne of Green Gables (1908), presented maternal feminist views in her books published in the period around World War I (1914-18). In Anne's secure world of Avonlea women make most of the decisions. Nellie McClung (1873–1951) of Manitoba, Canada, said "A woman's place is in the home; and out of it whenever she is called to guard those she loves and to improve conditions for them." In her 1915 book In Times Like These McClung wrote,

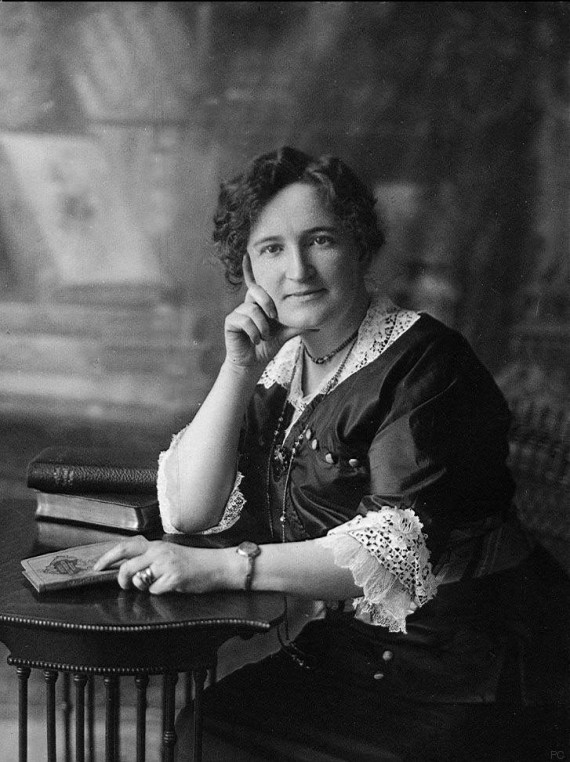
Nellie McClung (1873–1951) played a leading role in the maternal feminist movement in Canada.

Too long have the gentle ladies sat in their boudoirs looking at life in a mirror like the Lady of Shallot, while down below, in the street, the fight rages, and other women, and defenceless children, are getting the worst of it. But the cry is going up to the boudoir ladies to come down to help us, for the battle goes sorely; and many there are who are throwing aside the mirror and coming out to where the real things are. The world needs the work and help of the women, and the women must work, if the race will survive.

McClung wrote that "The woman's outlook on life is to save, to care for, to help. Men make wounds, and women bind them up." It was due to biological differences that women were morally superior to men and should have the vote. A modern feminist would see this as a reductive and biologically determinist view of gender, but at the time the concept did represent an advance towards giving women a greater and more meaningful role. In 1918 Canada gave women the right to vote, other than Indigenous women. Two years later Canadian women were given the right to run for election. However, the modern, urbanized "flappers" had little interest in the old-fashioned, moralistic causes of suffrage and temperance. The leaders of the maternal feminist movement were middle-aged and the maternal feminist movement was in decline.

There was still some progress. On 18 October 1929 Lord Sankey of the Privy Council overruled the Supreme Court of Canada and ruled that women were legally eligible to be appointed to the Senate of Canada. He said, "The exclusion of women from all public offices is a relic of days more barbarous than our". This was the culmination of a struggle led by judge Emily Murphy of Edmonton and four other prominent western women: Henrietta Edwards, Nellie McClung, Louise McKinney and Irene Parlby. The "Famous Five" were all advocates of maternal feminism, believing that women's distinctive biology suited them for a role in public life. With this ruling Canadian women were established as legal persons. A few days later the stock market crash led to the start of the Great Depression.

== Later analysis ==
Wayne Roberts noted in 1979 that the concept of "mother of the race" had replaced the more radical earlier feminist concept of "the new woman". The attempt to reconcile the domestic and maternal ideal with the push for equality handicapped the early feminist movement and limited the gains it made. The radical potential of the suffrage movement was crushed by "stultifying definitions of motherhood". Another criticism is that the exhortion to women to "mother the race" had racial undertones directed at new immigrants at the lowest level of the social hierarchy. There has been violent argument over whether maternal feminism in Germany led to Nazi-era coercive policies related to the family and reproduction. The historian Nancy F. Cott has proposed that maternal feminism would be better called "municipal housekeeping" or "civic maternalism", since by accepting existing sex roles it was not truly feminism.

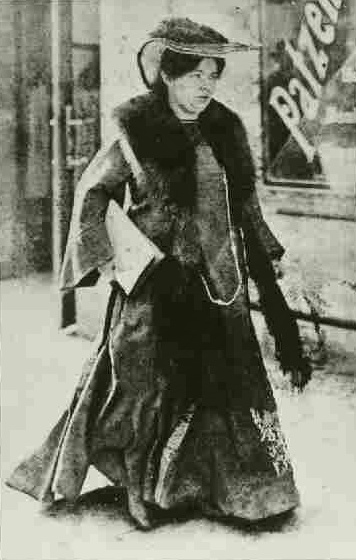
Helene Stöcker (1869–1943) was a sexual reformer who believed women should not strive to be like men

Other historians defend the movement as letting women maintain their female identity rather than become like men to bargain for their rights. As Helene Stöcker said "No, no, not to be a man or to want to be a man or to be mistaken for a man: how should that help us!". Naomi Black sees maternal feminism as inherently radical. Its proponents were "committed, whether they [knew] it or not, to a basic transformation of patriarchal structures and values."

The dismissive attitude typical of the 1970s has given way to a more understanding view of maternal feminism as a strategic adaptation to social attitudes of the time. Women's demands for reform were less threatening when expressed in maternal terms. The central role of evangelical Protestantism in the early feminist movement is better understood, and the view that early feminists were focused on suffrage has given way to an understanding of their interest in prohibition, eugenics, morality laws, financial security and protection of women and children.

== Recent years ==
The concept of maternal feminism is resilient. In January 1993 CBS debuted a "soft" drama for family viewing called Dr. Quinn, Medicine Woman about a woman doctor in Colorado Springs, Colorado, in the late 1860s. Despite poor reviews and an unpromising time slot, the show proved very successful. According to Bonnie J. Dow, the reason is Dr. Quinn's "integration of liberal feminist assumptions with a sentimentalized affirmation of motherhood." In the United States Sarah Ruddick argued in the 1980s for the existence of "maternal thinking" and Carol Gilligan wrote of women's "standard of relationship, an ethic of nurturance, responsibility, and care". They may represent a revival of maternal feminist concepts, which Hillary Clinton has perhaps sought to exploit in the political arena. Critics of Gilligan's revived version of maternal feminism say that to assume women are all essentially mothers, and that a male culture should be replaced in schools by a female culture, are both debatable in a democracy with diverse views about gender, sexuality and maternal roles.

The term has also been used in the different sense of feminism as it applies to mothers. Dr. Andrea O’Reilly of York University in Toronto said at a 2011 Women's Worlds conference in Ottawa, Canada, that feminist mothering must focus on things that are denied to women by patriarchal motherhood. Feminist mothers must take control of their lives and act according to their own beliefs rather than society's expectations.

== See also ==
- Conservative feminism
- Maternalism
- Natalism
- Anti-abortion movements
- Child tax credit
- Heteronormativity
- Tax on childlessness (Roman Jus trium liberorum, Romanian Decree 770) such as Bachelor tax
- Population decline
- Gender role

== Sources ==
- Anderson, Karrin Vasby; Sheeler, Kristina Horn (2005-08-23). Governing Codes: Gender, Metaphor, and Political Identity. Lexington Books. ISBN 978-0-7391-5570-7.
- Campbell, Peter (2010-11-02). Rose Henderson: A Woman for the People. MQUP. ISBN 978-0-7735-8116-6.
- Devereux, Cecily (2006-02-06). Growing a Race: Nellie L. McClung and the Fiction of Eugenic Feminism. McGill-Queen's Press - MQUP. ISBN 978-0-7735-7304-8.
- Diniejko, Dr Andrzej (2014). "Maternal feminism". Frances Trollope: a Maternal Feminist and Social Reformer.
- Dow, Bonnie J. (1996). "The Other Side of Postfeminism: Maternal Feminism in Dr. Quinn, Medicine Woman". Prime-time Feminism: Television, Media Culture, and the Women's Movement Since 1970. University of Pennsylvania Press. ISBN 0-8122-1554-0.
- Frezza, Bill (2014-06-09). "Studying the History of Feminism Might Save Feminists from Themselves". Forbes.
- Garrett, Heather L. (1999). "Feminizing Social Welfare: The Needlework Guild of Canada, 1892-1995". Célébrons Nos Réussites Féministes. University of Ottawa Press. ISBN 978-0-7766-0511-1.
- Goldrick-Jones, Amanda (2002-01-01). Men who Believe in Feminism. Greenwood Publishing Group. ISBN 978-0-275-96822-9.
- Hannah-Moffat, Kelly (2001). Punishment in Disguise: Penal Governance and Federal Imprisonment of Women in Canada. University of Toronto Press. ISBN 978-0-8020-8274-9.
- Hunt, Alan (1999-08-13). Governing Morals: A Social History of Moral Regulation. Cambridge University Press. ISBN 978-0-521-64689-5.
- LeGates, Marlene (2012-09-10). In Their Time: A History of Feminism in Western Society. Routledge. ISBN 978-1-136-77903-9.
- Levinson, David; Cookson, Peter; Sadovnik, Alan (2014-01-21). Education and Sociology: An Encyclopedia. Routledge. ISBN 978-1-135-57078-1.
- "Maternal Feminism". Manitoba Historical Society. 2009-08-27.
- Newton, Janice (1995-01-01). The Feminist Challenge to the Canadian Left, 1900-1918. McGill-Queen's Press - MQUP. ISBN 978-0-7735-1291-7.
- Pedersen, Diana Lynn (1996). Changing Women, Changing History: A Bibliography of the History of Women in Canada. McGill-Queen's Press - MQUP. ISBN 978-0-88629-280-5.
- Reisenwitz, Cathy (2013-06-14). "Christina Hoff Sommers' "Maternal Feminism": Same Old Sexism, New Packaging". Sex and the State.
- Rothwell, Erika (1999). "Knitting Up the World: L.M. Montgomery and Maternal Feminism in Canada". L.M. Montgomery and Canadian Culture. University of Toronto Press. ISBN 978-0-8020-4406-8.
- Sharpe, Robert J.; McMahon, Patricia I. (2008-04-12). The Persons Case: The Origins and Legacy of the Fight for Legal Personhood. University of Toronto Press. ISBN 978-1-4426-9234-3.
- Smith, Jill Suzanne (2014-02-28). Berlin Coquette: Prostitution and the New German Woman, 1890–1933. Cornell University Press. ISBN 978-0-8014-6970-1.
- Thomsen, Natasha (2009-01-01). Women's Rights. Infobase Publishing. ISBN 978-1-4381-0905-3.
- Urban, Annie (2011-07-11). "What is Maternal Feminism?". care2.com.
