= The Farmer's Sun =

Weekly periodical

- Type: Weekly newspaper
- Founder: George Weston Wrigley
- Founded: 1892
- Ceased publication: 1934
- Political alignment: Progressive
- Headquarters: London, Ontario

The Farmer's Sun (also known as the Canadian Farmer's Sun and The Weekly Sun at various times) was a progressive weekly periodical published in Ontario from 1892 until 1934. It was, at various times, the official organ of several successive political movements: the Patrons of Industry, the Farmers Association of Ontario, and the United Farmers of Ontario, and supporting the idea of a progressive farmers' political party.

== History ==
The newspaper was founded in London, Ontario in May 1892 by George Weston Wrigley, a long time publisher of labour newspapers. The paper supporting the Ontario Patrons of Industry, a rapidly growing agrarian reform movement. The Patrons were not a political party, but had political goals. They wanted a smaller and simpler government, abolition of railway subsidies and reduced reciprocal tariffs. They also wanted laws against cartels and monopolies.

In 1893, Wrigley agreed to devote three pages of his paper to the Patrons in return for their financial assistance. The publication described itself as “the official organ of the Patrons of Industry of Ontario and Quebec.” In May 1894, the paper moved to offices in the Evening Star building in Toronto. In 1895, the Patrons bought a 50% share of the paper, which claimed to have a circulation of 30,000. The paper gave extensive coverage to the Patrons, but also covered many other reform movements and proposals. It avoided religious controversy, but clearly took the Social Gospel position that the value of Christianity lay in practical deeds.

In 1895-96, Wrigley published a paper named Brotherhood Era, which he also inserted as a supplement in the Sun. It was aimed at urban readers, and concentrated on the injustice of industrial capitalism, supporting causes such as the single tax, the eight-hour day and equal suffrage, and opposing militarism. By April 1896, the Sun was in financial difficulties, with declining circulation. Wrigley was replaced as editor by Goldwin Smith. In the 1896 Federal elections internal dissensions appeared among the Patrons, who only won three seats.

With the decline of the party, the newspaper was sold to Goldwin Smith. Where Wrigley had used the paper to try to promote an alliance between farmers and labour, Smith aimed to turn the newspaper into "the voice of rural Ontario." He ceased publication of a supplement, The Brotherhood Era, aimed at industrial workers and expanded the Sun to a ten-page publication with the slogan “An Independent Journal For Farm and Home.”

The newspaper, now called The Weekly Sun, supported agrarianism and free trade and acted as the organ of the Farmers Association of Ontario until that organization dissolved in 1907. The newspaper had a circulation of 16,000 in 1909. Smith died in 1910 and the newspaper soon became the unofficial organ of the United Farmers of Ontario after its founding in 1914.

In 1919, the newspaper's board of directors agreed to sell the Sun to the UFO which published it under its publication wing, the Farmer's Publishing Company, and renamed the newspaper The Farmer's Sun, "the Official Organ of the United Farmers of Ontario." The paper soon increased its publication schedule to twice weekly. Around this time, Agnes Macphail began contributing writing to the Sun, including reminiscences about life in rural Ontario.

With the fragmentation of the UFO in 1922, during a crisis of the UFO-led provincial government in Ontario under Ernest C. Drury, circulation fell grew more conservative. Following the dissolution of a brief political alliance between the UFO and the Co-operative Commonwealth Federation of Ontario in 1934, the paper was sold to Graham Spry and Alan Plaunt who renamed it New Commonwealth and operated it as the organ of the League for Social Reconstruction and the Co-operative Commonwealth Federation (Ontario Section).

== Aftermath ==
In 1936, the UFO launched the Rural Co-operator as its new organ and to continue the tradition of the Sun. The newspaper, which was published twice a month, subsequently became the organ of the UFO's successor, the Ontario Federation of Agriculture. Rural Co-operator changed its name to Farm & Country in the 1960s and would continue publishing as a twice monthly tabloid until 1997 and then a glossy magazine until 1999 when the OFA's publishing arm, the Agricultural Publishing Company Ltd., went into receivership. A number of the magazine's former writers went on to found Better Farming magazine.
