= Socialist Party of British Columbia =

Provincial political party in Canada (1901–1935)

- Former provincial party
- Founded: 1901
- Dissolved: 1935
- Succeeded by: Co-Operative Commonwealth Federation (British Columbia Section)
- Headquarters: Vancouver
- Ideology: Socialism; Impossibilism

The Socialist Party of British Columbia (SPBC) was a provincial political party in British Columbia, Canada, from 1901 to 1935. In 1903, the SPBC won seats in the Legislative Assembly of British Columbia.

The editor of the SPBC newspaper, the Western Clarion, was E. T. Kingsley, a prominent Canadian socialist.

It merged with other groups in 1905 to form a national political party, the Socialist Party of Canada (SPC). In 1911, the Socialist Party of Canada (BC section) members joined the new Social Democratic Party of Canada, the earliest example of political party reform in British Columbia and Canada.

The Socialist Party of Canada in British Columbia joined the BC Co-operative Commonwealth Federation in 1933.

== History ==
=== Forerunners ===
In 1872, unification of labour began in Canada with the regionally popular Trade Unions Act, enacted by the Conservative Party of the first Canadian Parliament. The new act removed penalties for being a member of a union, which were capable of striking for improved employment, closing a company, and/or disrupting access to goods and services in Canada.

In 1898, the first Canadian Socialist League branch and headquarters opened in Montreal, Quebec. Over the next four years, over 60 branches of Canadian Socialist Leagues were opened in Canada. A new branch of the Socialist Labour Party, was formed in Vancouver, British Columbia. On 23 November 1899, a new socialist organization was formed in Vancouver:

"On Thursday, the 23rd, there was started on Mt. Pleasant an organization to be known as "The Vancouver Socialist Club". There was not a very large attendance but those who were there all fighters and mean business. The objects of the organization are to organize educate and agitate the cause of socialism, and in any matters of public interest the Vancouver Socialist Club propose to be heard from." (Note: Event article referenced from newspaper found with other newspapers (Vancouver, Toronto, Montreal and New York city newspapers) during demolition (recycling) of an unsafe log cabin-house, Okanagan Valley, (Zdralek Cove), Westbank, British Columbia, 11–14 December 1962.)

On 25 November 1899, The Province newspaper reported:

"Mr. I. Olcovick, president of the Seattle Socialist Trade Union Alliance, paid a flying visit to Mr. W. Maclain of this city on Saturday last. Mr. Olcovick was formerly a captain in the United States army, and it was his company of troops which refused to shoot down striking workmen during the famous railway strike of a few years ago. The soldiers were ordered to shoot by their senior officer, but on Capt. Olcovick’s orders they did not do so. He visited the Socialist organization in this city and was well pleased with the progress being made by the members. He left for Seattle yesterday morning."

On 9 June 1900, during the ninth BC general election, the first socialist candidates sought election without success: Labour and Socialist candidates finished last of twelve in the electoral district of Vancouver City.

=== Establishment ===
In 1901, the first use of the political party name "Socialist Party of British Columbia" occurred. The provincial Marxist movement at that date included just five socialist locals which divided their allegiances between the tiny Socialist Labor Party, the Canadian Socialist League, and the United Socialist Labor Party. In an effort to unify these scattered forces, a unity convention was held and the Socialist Party of British Columbia was formed. Provincial headquarters were established in the city of Vancouver.

There was a strong American influence with the new organization, reflected in the group's leading personnel and programme. Chief provincial organizer of the SPBC was Ernest Burns, formerly an activist in the Social Democratic Federation in Great Britain before moving to North America where he organized for the People's Party and the Socialist Party in Washington. The reform-oriented programme of the Socialist Party of America was adopted wholesale by the new Canadian group.

This new unity proved short-lived, as the comparatively moderate orientation of the SPBC proved insufficient for the revolutionary socialist local organization in Nanaimo, which quickly broke from the SPBC to form the Revolutionary Socialist Party of Canada. Pressure for a radicalisation of the party was brought to bear and in January 1902 a second annual convention of the SPBC was held which was attended by delegates from 14 local groups, including a delegate of the Nanaimo-based Revolutionary Socialist Party of Canada. The Socialist Party of America's programme was scrapped and a new document eliminating all "immediate demands" was adopted.

Unity negotiations followed this left turn for the organization and in November 1902 the SBBC and the Revolutionary Socialist Party were successfully reunited by a membership referendum vote. Organizational unity was followed by a unified provincial newspaper in May 1903 when the Western Clarion was formed via the three-way merger of the Revolutionary Socialist Party's Clarion, the Vancouver-based Western Socialist, and the Strike Bulletin of the United Brotherhood of Railway Employees.

=== Electoral success ===
The Socialist Party of British Columbia picked up a valuable adherent in 1903 when member of the provincial legislature James Hawthornthwaite switched his allegiance from the Lib-Lab alliance to the fledgling Socialist Party. Hawthornthwaite won re-election in his Nanaimo riding in October 1903 tenth general election, where he was joined in the legislature by Parker Williams, a former Welsh coal miner who had lived previously in Alberta and Washington state. The pair wound up holding the balance of power at the 1904 legislative session and were able to win legislative victories with respect to coal mine regulation, boiler inspections, and the 8-hour day.

From 30–31 December 1904, the Socialist Party of Canada began to unify provincial socialists to gain legislative assembly seats and sit in opposition to the national government in Ottawa. The fourth annual convention of the Socialist Party of British Columbia was held.

=== BC affiliate of the Socialist Party of Canada ===
On 19 February 1905, the first meeting of a national revolutionary Marxist organization in Canada was held, seven years after beginnings of a national agenda for the Socialist League in the province Quebec. The first Socialist Party of Canada was formed by the Dominion Executive Committee of the Socialist Party of Canada by merging the provincial Socialist Party of British Columbia and related groups representing socialists in the provinces of Manitoba and Ontario. The Revolutionary Socialist Party, with links to manifestos for a national state of workers (workers' state), gained popularity. Socialist Party gained support especially from employees of coal mines and railways, and with immigrants from non-English speaking Europe, notably in the region of Nanaimo, Vancouver Island. The two-year-old Western Clarion newspaper became part of socialist propaganda in Canada. With a circulation of four to ten thousand, it was published by E. T. Kingsley.

James Hawthornthwaite and Parker Williams sat for two years with opposition seats in the provincial legislature of BC as members of the SPC. Popularity of the SPC continued in BC until the beginnings of losses to a moderate socialist party in six years.

On 3 February 1907, the eleventh general election for the Legislative Assembly of British Columbia was held. Three Socialists were elected in a Regional District of Nanaimo electoral area and Grandforks (West Kootenay, central BC). They sat with thirteen Liberals as opposition to provincial government. The Socialist Party of Canada (BC section) split into revolutionary SPCBC and moderate Social Democratic Party of Canada.

On 25 November 1909, the twelfth general election was held. Two Socialists were elected from a Regional District of Nanaimo electoral area. They sat with two Liberals as opposition to 30 Conservatives of the provincial government.

=== Decade of the 1910s ===
In 1911, the Socialist Party of Canada (BC section) members joined the new Social Democratic Party of Canada, the earliest example of political party reform in British Columbia and Canada.

In the 1912 British Columbia general election, Parker Williams of the Socialist Party, representing Newcastle and John Thomas Wilmot Place, a Social Democrat, representing Nanaimo City, formed the opposition to 39 Conservatives and one Independent Conservative of the provincial government.

On 16 September 1912, the Vancouver Island Coal Strike began at Cumberland, on Vancouver Island.

On 1 May 1913, a Labor Day meeting began a general strike to shut down all Vancouver Island coal mining. Strike-breakers undertook operations against 3,500 miners, and there were incidents of destruction, violence, rioting, arrests. In July, Minister of Labour for province of British Columbia visited the mine strike on Vancouver Island. On 18 August, the Seaforth Highlanders of Canada were called out to aid civil power during the strike. They remained in Nanaimo till August 1914. A meeting of 1,200 people was held in Nanaimo.

This was the end of organized coal mine labor on Vancouver Island, as the union lost to owners and strikebreakers. Until World War I, United Mine Workers of America continued strike pay for Vancouver Island miners.

The Socialist Party lost one seat before the strike, which was not regained in next general election of British Columbia.

From 1914 to 1917, William Arthur Pritchard was the editor of the socialist and labour politics newspaper Western Clarion.

In the 1916 British Columbia general election, one independent socialist was elected: Parker Williams, representing Newcastle.

In January 1918, the British Columbia Federation of Labour forms the Federated Labour Party. Socialists join the Federated Labour Party in British Columbia. Later that year, the socialist newspaper, the Western Clarion was banned by the federal government.

From 15 May – 26 June 1919, Winnipeg General Strike took place in Winnipeg, Manitoba. On 17 June, eight (also published as ten) strike leaders were arrested and imprisoned, five were members of the Socialist Party of Canada, Winnipeg. The Winnipeg General Strike arose from increasing popularity of a revolutionary communist party, and decreasing popularity of a socialist party. The arrested SPC leaders change their goal to achieving representation of workers for nationally unified employee management named Labour instead of Socialist.

=== Decade of the 1920s ===
No Socialists were elected in the 1920 British Columbia general election or the 1924 British Columbia general election.

The Federated Labour Party was created in 1920 by the British Columbia Federation of Labour by absorbing the Social Democratic Party of Canada and part of the Socialist Party of Canada.

In 1921, the two-year-old One Big Union, a labour representation project of the Socialist Party of Canada, with over 40,000 members, was reduced by the departure of the more than 20,000 members of the lumber industry union (International Woodworkers of America) of British Columbia.

In 1925, SPC membership was declining, and the Western Clarion, which had been unbanned in 1920, was closed after 22 years of publishing socialist and labour news. The SPC was closed, and reduced to small discussion groups in a number of cities.

In 1926, the Independent Labour Party was founded as the combined Federated Labour Party and Canadian Labour Party (B.C. section) branches. In 1932, the Independent Labour Party in Vancouver, led by Ernest Winch, changed its name to the ILP (Socialist) and then, in June 1932 re-founded the Socialist Party of Canada (BC Section).

On 30 July (August 1), the SPCBC met to establish a national political agenda in western Canada. Socialist and labour party delegates included the SPCBC at the Western Labour Conference, in Calgary. Fourteen United Farmers of Alberta delegates were included in choosing a name for a new nationwide socialist-labour party, the Co-operative Commonwealth Federation. Delegates included nineteen jobless men and women of The Great Depression. The Socialist Party of Canada (BC Section) merged with the Co-operative Commonwealth Federation in 1933 to become the British Columbia section of the CCF. In August, the SPCBC and the CCF (BC) became associated CCF clubs. SPC members Ernest Winch and Harold Winch were elected to the British Columbia Legislative Assembly as CCF MLAs.

=== Merger with Co-operative Commonwealth Federation ===
In 1935, there was another merger of the Socialist Party of Canada with the Co-operative Commonwealth Federation, but it retained its own organization within the CCF for several years. The CCF eventually became the British Columbia New Democratic Party.

In 1936, SPC supporters dominated the BC CCF's provincial executive and played a crucial role in a split in the CCF that resulted in the expulsion of moderate CCF leader Robert Connell and the departure of four of seven CCF MLAs who formed the British Columbia Social Constructive Party.

In 1938, Harold Winch became the BC CCF leader. He held the position until 1953.

== Election results ==
Election	Seats			Votes			Legislative role	Notes
Election	Won	+/-	Rank	Received	%	+/-	Legislative role	Notes
1903	2 / 42 (5%)	n/a	3rd	4,787	7.96%	n/a	Third party	Conservative majority
1907	3 / 42 (7%)	▲1	3rd	5,603	8.87%	▲0.91	Third party	Conservative majority
1909	2 / 42 (5%)	▼1	2nd (Note: Tied with Liberals.)	11,665	11.50%	▲2.63	Third party	Conservative majority
1909	2 / 42 (5%)	▼1	2nd	11,665	11.50%	▲2.63	Official Opposition	Conservative majority
1909	2 / 42 (5%)	▼1	2nd	11,665	11.50%	▲2.63	Third party	Conservative majority
1912	1 / 42 (2%)	▼1	2nd (Note: Tied with Social Democratic Party.)	9,366	11.08%	▼0.42	Official Opposition	Conservative majority
1916	0 / 47 (0%)	▼1	n/a	2,106	1.17%	▼9.91	No seats	Liberal majority
1920	0 / 47 (0%)	0	n/a	12,386	3.50%	▲2.33	No seats	Liberal majority
1924	0 / 48 (0%)	0	n/a	4,364	1.26%	▼2.24	No seats	Liberal majority
1928	did not contest						No seats	Conservative majority
1933	0 / 47 (0%)	0	n/a	370	0.10%	n/a	No seats	Liberal majority

== See also ==
- List of Canadian socialist parties
- Socialism in Canada
