= Western Clarion =

Canadian socialist newspaper (1903–1925)

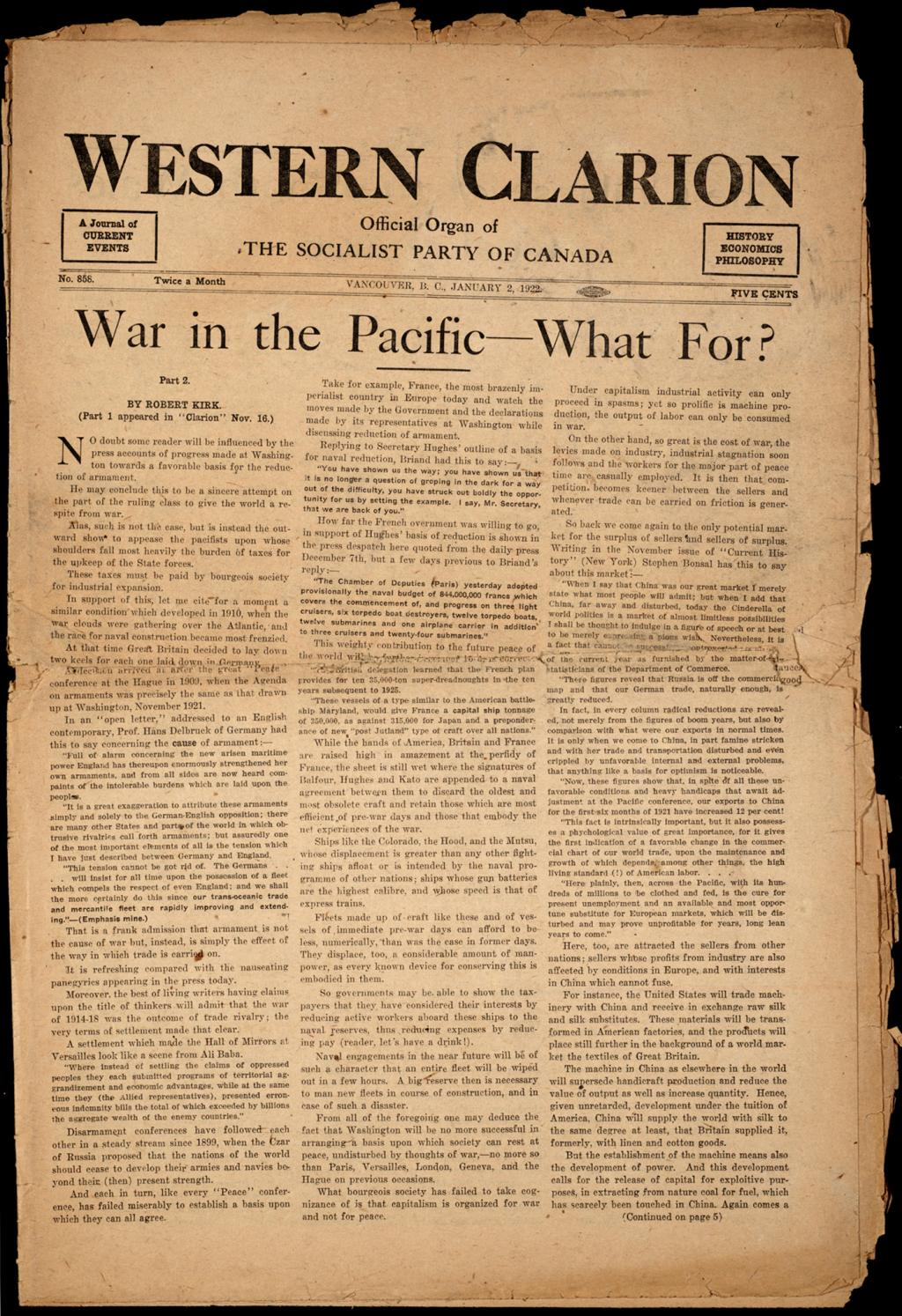
- 2 January 1922 cover
- Type: Weekly newspaper
- Founder: Richard Parmater Pettipiece
- Founded: 1903
- Ceased publication: 1925
- Political alignment: Socialist
- Language: English
- Headquarters: Vancouver
- Country: Canada
- ISSN: 1709-7568
- OCLC number: 53905043
- Website: https://open.library.ubc.ca/collections/bcnewspapers/wclarion

The Western Clarion was a newspaper launched in January 1903 that became the official organ of the Socialist Party of Canada (SPC). At one time it was the leading left-wing newspaper in Canada. It lost influence after 1910–11 when various groups broke away from the SPC. During World War I (1914–14) the Western Clarion was internationalist and denounced a war in which workers fought while others profited. Following the Russian Revolution it adopted a pro-Bolshevik stance, The paper was banned in 1918, but allowed to resume publication in 1920. Its circulation dwindled as SPC membership dwindled, and the last issue appeared in 1925.

== Origins ==
In 1902 Richard Parmater Pettipiece, who had been publishing the Lardeau Eagle, a miners' journal that supported the Socialist League, bought an interest in George Weston Wrigley's Citizen and Country. Starting in July 1902 the journal began appearing in Vancouver with Wrigley's help as the Canadian Socialist. The newspaper was aligned with the Canadian Socialist League. In October 1902 Pettipiece renamed the paper the Western Socialist. The paper merged with the Clarion of Nanaimo and the Strike Bulletin of the United Brotherhood of Railway Employees (UBRE) and appeared as the Western Clarion on 8 May 1903. The paper was named after the Clarion published by Robert Blatchford in England.

== Pre-war period: 1903–14 ==
The Western Clarion had a guaranteed circulation of 6,000 three days a week. Although privately owned the paper expressed the views of the Socialist Party of British Columbia, but gave coverage to controversies among Canadian socialist groups. The provincial executive of the SPBC controlled the Western Clarion by late 1903, and appointed E. T. Kingsley (1856–1929) editor. The newspaper became one of the most prominent left wing publications in Canada before World War I (1914–18).

In 1905 Kingsley was one of the founders of the Socialist Party of Canada (SPC). The Western Clarion became the SPC organ. According to Alex Paterson, when the SPC was in its prime Kingsley, "pretty well ran the Western Clarion and the Party." He was editor until 1908, and continue to finance the newspaper until 1912, going deeply into debt as a result. Donald Gorden McKenzie (1887–1963) was editor from 1908 to 1911. The SPC saw itself as the preeminent socialist party in the world. McKenzie said, only partly in jest, "since Marx died nobody was capable of throwing light on [economic] matters except the editor of the Clarion, whoever we may happen to be."

By 1910 the SPC was losing control of locals on the prairies, where eastern European immigrants resented the dominance of English speakers. The Social Democratic Party (SDP) began to be organized to represent these groups and the moderate British socialists. The SDP became a national party in December 1911. The SPC lost much of its membership outside British Columbia, and was weakened in its home province. The Western Clarion was published on an irregular schedule in the fall of 1911. On 2 December 1911 the Western Clarion reported that McKenzie had resigned as editor and party secretary. From November 1912 to March 1913 the Western Clarion ceased publication, other than in some space provided by the BC Federationist. In March 1913 J. H. Burrough, editor of the Clarion, wrote that the SPC as a whole was suffering from "the general malady of ‘laisser faire'".

== Women's issues ==
Bertha Merrill Burns, a supporter of feminism, prohibition and socialism, was the first woman to serve on the executive of the SPBC. In July 1903 she moved to Vancouver and became editor of the women's column in the Western Clarion. She discussed women's suffrage, religion, temperance, morality, prostitution, child care, women in paid work and at home. She used these themes to present socialism favourably to women, and to show the importance of the "women question" in socialism. Burn's column ended in 1903.

McKenzie said the "average woman may desire a hat or a husband of some other trifle, but it cannot truthfully be said she is pining away for lack of a vote. In 1908 he refused to start a new women's column. He said he would not "cater" to women, and that, "As a general rule, a woman who is a Socialist is a Socialist because some man is." He said "If the Clarion's 'Woman's Column' ever becomes like 'woman's columns' in some other Socialist papers, which seem to be written for human dressmakers and cooks, the poor Scotchman [McKenzie] will be turned loose with a meat-axe."

The Western Clarion said, "Capitalism has torn women from the home, thrust her into the economic field in competition with the opposite sex, grinds her life into profits and ultimately forces her to sell her body in order to live. Capitalism today is fast destroying the home, the palace, that we are told woman should exclusively occupy as her position in society." The basic message was that socialism would return women to their proper place as homemakers.

== World War I: 1914–18 ==
The party did not openly support World War I, but took an internationalist position. In the 24 October 1914 issue J. H. Burroughs published an editorial that expressed hope that Germany would soon be defeated. The editorial, titled "The Affirmation of German Culture", was written by E. T. Kingsley. He blamed the war on Germany's militaristic culture. This caused a storm of controversy, with a 4–1 vote by the Dominion Executive Committee to condemn the editorial. Burrough was replaced by William Arthur Pritchard as Party secretary and editor of the Western Clarion. The Western Clarion appeared weekly until 10 April 1915, then monthly. In an editorial titled "Attrition" in January 1916 Pritchard noted the loss of millions of lives that had occurred. He said that when governments said they would fight to the last man, they meant they would fight to the last worker. In March 1916 Jack Kavanagh wrote,

One of the most cherished delusions held by the workers resident in the British Empire, and one that is being rudely shattered, is that of the "right of free speech." As a matter of fact, this "right" disappears with alarming rapidity whenever free speech is contrary to the interests of the master class, whose interests are, at the present time, sheltered from the bitter winds of adverse criticism by the mantle of patriotism, which has always been in favor as a refuge by every pirate who desired his operations to remain unquestioned…the fact that a few millions of slaves are killed, disabled, or driven insane is but a side issue. Because of that, our so called "right" to free speech becomes restricted to speaking in favour of a continuation of the slaughter now in progress.

In July 1917 the Western Clarion protested the proposal to introduce conscription, saying "The International Working Class has but one REAL enemy, the International Capitalist Class." The October Revolution of 1917 led to a Bolshevik government in Russia. In January 1918 the Western Clarion reproduced an article by Leon Trotsky from another journal, and from then on often published articles by Russian revolutionaries. The chief press censor warned Chris Stephenson, editor of the Western Clarion, that his paper might be in violation of the censor's conduct guidelines. Military intelligence officers raided the Western Clarion's editorial offices in May 1918. Stephenson ignored the warning and continued to publish articles calling for revolution along the same lines as Russia. On 28 September 1918 a government order declared fourteen radical organizations outlawed. The newspaper was banned from publication.

== Last years: 1918–25 ==
A successor paper, the Red Flag, was published twice monthly from 18 December 1918 to 11 October 1919, when it was suppressed. The Indicator was published from 18 October 1919 until January 1920, when the ban on the Western Clarion was removed. On 15 January 1920 the Western Clarion reappeared, with a note that said, "When the Clarion was banned and after several attempts to get the ban lifted had failed, the Red Flag was issued. This name was under pressure, later changed to the Indicator which we have continued to publish as a weekly to this date. The Indicator is now discontinued."

In the 1920s the party declined in membership and activity. Jack Harrington and Chris Stephenson continued to present to SPC position in the Western Clarion. In the early 1920s the Western Clarion often discussed the weakness and lack of organization of the working classes of Canada and America. In 1924 John Amos (Jack) McDonald wrote from San Francisco expressed dismay that the Western Clarion no longer spoke for a revolutionary party, and just published a collection of views. The newspaper's circulation dropped steadily, and the issue of July–August 1925 was the last. Pritchard blamed the death of the paper on the reactionary and conservative mood of the day as exemplified by Benito Mussolini, the Palmer Raids, the Ku Klux Klan and the American Legion.

== See also ==
- Western Socialist (1933–1980)

== Sources ==
- Angus, Ian (2004). Canadian Bolsheviks: The Early Years of the Communist Party of Canada. Trafford Publishing. p. 10. ISBN 978-1-4120-3808-9.
- Campbell, Peter (2000-01-01). Canadian Marxists and the Search for a Third Way. McGill-Queen's Press - MQUP. ISBN 978-0-7735-6783-2.
- Hardt, Hanno; Brennen, Bonnie (1995). Newsworkers: Toward a History of the Rank and File. U of Minnesota Press. ISBN 978-0-8166-2706-6.
- McCartney, Dale Michael (2004). "A Crisis of Commitment: Socialist Internationalism in British Columbia during the Great War" (PDF). Simon Fraser University.
- McCormack, A. Ross (1991). Reformers, Rebels, and Revolutionaries: The Western Canadian Radical Movement 1899–1919. University of Toronto Press. ISBN 978-0-8020-7682-3.
- McKay, Ian (2008). Reasoning Otherwise: Leftists and the People's Enlightenment in Canada, 1890–1920. Between the Lines. ISBN 978-1-897071-49-6.
- Milne, J. M. (1973). "History of the Socialist Party of Canada" (PDF). World Socialist Movement.
- Newell, Peter E. (2008). The Impossibilists: A Brief Profile of the Socialist Party of Canada. London: Athena Press. ISBN 9781847483232.
- Newton, Janice (1995-01-01). The Feminist Challenge to the Canadian Left, 1900–1918. McGill-Queen's Press - MQUP. ISBN 978-0-7735-1291-7.
- Wade, Rex A. (2005-04-21). The Russian Revolution, 1917. Cambridge University Press. ISBN 978-0-521-84155-9.
