= Canadian Socialist League =

- Founded: 1898
- Dissolved: 1905
- Succeeded by: Socialist Party of Canada
- Headquarters: Toronto, Ontario, Canada
- Newspaper: Citizen and Country
- Ideology: Christian socialism

The Canadian Socialist League (CSL) was the first nationwide socialist organization founded in Canada. It originated in Montreal in 1898, but was strongest in Ontario and British Columbia. The leaders espoused a moderate socialism based on Christian reform principles. Members of the league formed provincial socialist parties. In 1905 these parties merged into the Socialist Party of Canada (SPC).

== Foundation ==
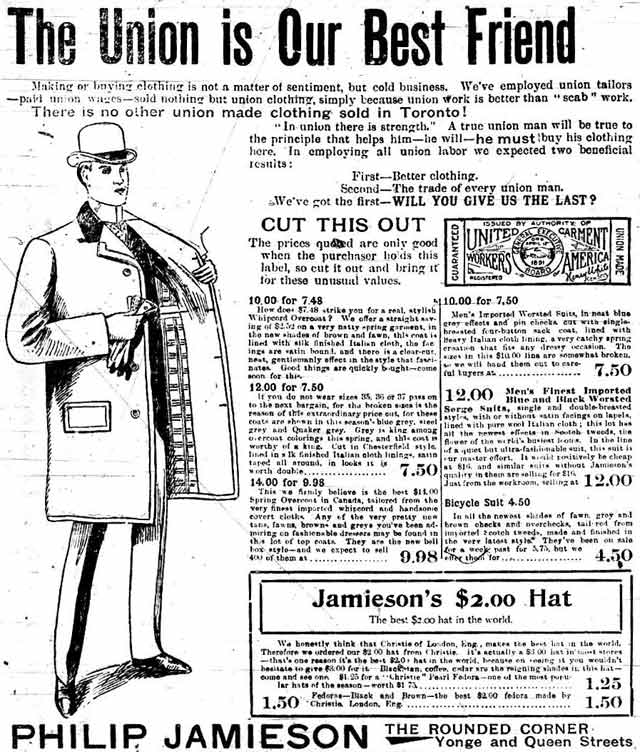
Advertisement in Citizen and Country (4 May 1900) from a tailor who proclaims his support for Trade Unionism

The Canadian Socialist League (CSL) was formed in Montreal in 1898 by former members of the Socialist Labor Party. The founders rejected the Labor party leadership of Daniel De Leon. Support for the league appeared about the same time in the summer of 1899 in Montreal and Toronto. In Ontario the CSL was organized by George Weston Wrigley and Thomas Phillips Thompson, both former Knights of Labor, in an effort to pull together the reform forces that had become fragmented after the Patrons of Industry were defeated in the 1896 federal election. The CSL had a local in Port Moody, British Columbia, by January 1900, which became the focus of its activities in that province. John M. Cameron, a former member of the Utopian Ruskin colony, was the organizer in British Columbia. A formal organizing convention for the Ontario Socialist League was held in Toronto in November 1901 to provide the base for the national organization.

Wrigley, editor of the CSL's organ Citizen and Country, dominated the league with his Christian socialism. The CSL leader said socialism was applied Christianity and "Christ was the first socialist." The league rejected the ideology of class struggle, and emphasized reform and public ownership. It has been described as a transitional group of Ruskinian romantics and moderate Christian socialists. Although Marxist-oriented socialists made the group more radical, the CSL was still wedded to reformist ideals. The CSL was broad and flexible, open to radicals, labourites, socialists, and women's rights activists. Leadership was mostly male and English-speaking. Women who were active in the organization were typically married and did not work for a living.

== Activities ==
The CSL was primarily concerned with educating the electorate about socialism, and was not a parliamentary party in the modern sense. It held meetings to stir up interest in socialism and to debate subjects such as the relationship between socialism and Christianity. Disputes soon erupted between Protestant ministers and Marxists. The minister Charles Sheldon of Topeka, Kansas, author of the best-selling novel In His Steps, was invited to Toronto to address the league and accepted the position of honorary president of the league's executive. In his writings Sheldon discussed social problems such as unemployment, poverty, racialism, alcohol, corruption and so on, always asking "What would Jesus do?"

Edith Wrigley, wife of the publisher George Wrigley, edited the women's column in the Citizen and Country. She was also active in the Woman's Christian Temperance Union (WCTU). In her short-lived column "The Kingdom of the Home" she discussed issues such as suffrage, charity, prohibition, prostitution and the servant problem. (The so-called "servant problem" was the problem that middle-class families had with cleaning, cooking, and especially entertaining at the level that was socially expected. It was too much work for any one person to do herself, but middle-class families, unlike wealthy families, could not afford to pay the wages necessary to attract and retain skilled household employees.) Her message was typical of maternal feminism, that love and purity, the values of the home sphere, should also guide politics. Other women activists in the CSL were Emily Stowe and Augusta Stowe-Gullen.

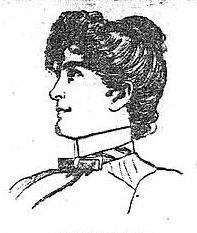
Margaret Haile, CSL candidate for North Toronto, from 1902 campaign material

In 1902 the CSL nominated Margaret Haile as its candidate for North Toronto in the 1902 provincial election. Haile was also active in the WCTU, and took a maternal feminist position. As a woman she was opposed by various factions, and an attempt was made to exclude her from the ballot. The Toiler, the labour paper, would not endorse her. She won only 81 votes in the election, but was hailed by Citizen and Country as the first woman to run in a political election in the British Empire.

== Provincial groups ==
In April 1900 the United Socialist Labor Party (USLP) was formed in British Columbia as a splinter group from the Socialist Labor Party (SLP). The first socialist convention was held in British Columbia in October 1900. The CSL cooperated with the USLP at this meeting, where the red flag flew over the hall during the sessions despite attempts by the police to have it hauled down. A provincial federation within the CSL was agreed but was not in fact established. In 1901 the Socialist Party of British Columbia was formed, allied with the Socialist Party of America. Hermon F. Titus, editor of the Seattle Socialist, helped organize this more radical group. He said that Wrigley "stood for capitalistic thought, for compromise and for pasturage on both sides of the fence."

By January 1902 there were more than sixty CSL branches in Canada, including New Brunswick, Ontario, Manitoba, British Columbia, and the Northwest Territories. The Ontario Socialist League, Socialist Party of Manitoba and Socialist Party of British Columbia had been formed by CSL members. In March 1902 John Cameron organized a CSL local in Winnipeg, recruiting from members of the labour party. In November 1902 the Socialist Party of Manitoba was formed. In 1902 James Hurst Hawthornthwaite, an independent labour candidate who was elected to the British Columbia legislature for the coal-mining constituency of Nanaimo, joined the Revolutionary Socialist Party of Canada. This party had split from the Socialist Party of British Columbia due to ideological differences. The Revolutionary Socialist Party proved short-lived. A series of organizational mergers and splits followed in British Columbia.

In 1902 Richard Parmater Pettipiece bought an interest in Citizen and Country, which he moved to Vancouver. With the help of Wrigley the paper began to appear in July 1902 as the Canadian Socialist. It was renamed to Western Socialist, then was merged with two other newspapers and appeared on 8 May 1903 as the Western Clarion. The Western Clarion had a guaranteed circulation of 6,000 three days a week. Although privately owned the paper expressed the views of the Socialist Party of British Columbia, but gave coverage to controversies among Canadian socialist groups.

== Socialist Party of Canada ==
In May 1903 there were discussions about merging the Socialist Parties of Ontario, Manitoba, and British Columbia into a national party, but the project was put off due to lack of money. At the end of December 1904 the SPBC held its fourth convention, where delegates were told the locals in Winnipeg, Toronto, and Fredericton, New Brunswick were interested in forming a Socialist Party of Canada (SPC). Wrigley and Thomson helped merge the CSL into the SPC. By 1905 all of the Canadian socialist organizations had come together in the SPC. The party was formed officially on 19 February 1905.

The SPC was the first socialist party in Canada to be a serious force in electoral politics. It was radical, advocated the overthrow of capitalism, and rejected the Second International. When the SPC became dominant, this was a step backward for women, since the men who dominated the SPC refused to support women's causes such as suffrage and fair wages. Ian McKay considers that the blend of ideas from Karl Marx and Herbert Spencer into the radical religious materialism of the Canadian Socialist League can be traced in successor socialist groups in Canada for the next twenty years.
