= League for Social Reconstruction =

Canadian socialist group

- Abbreviation: LSR
- Formation: February 23, 1932; 94 years ago
- Dissolved: 1942
- Type: Think tank
- Purpose: To bring centralized planning to Canada's economy, and its social programs.
- Location: Toronto/Montreal
- Region served: Canada
- Official language: English
- Main organ: Assembly
- Affiliations: Co-operative Commonwealth Federation

The League for Social Reconstruction (LSR) was a circle of Canadian socialists formed in 1932, in response to events such as World War I and the Great Depression, as well as increased industrialization and urbanization. The group advocated for social and economic reformation as well as political education, and esteemed 'rational moralism' as an ideology that could be utilized and applied to prevent suffering in Canada. The league aimed to act as an independent force influencing public policy reform in Canada during a tumultuous period. Working with both intellectuals and politicians, the league assisted in the creation of centralized social welfare and national assistance schemes. The LSR disbanded in 1942, during the Second World War.

== Political economy and the Great Depression ==
The Great Depression resulted in a protracted period of mass unemployment, and it was the impact unemployment had on Canadians that motivated the LSR into action. National unemployment peaked in the first half of 1933 at 32 percent; but 32 percent was only the average, in some towns unemployment reached nearly 50 percent. The LSR were roused, as they faced the ravages of unemployment in their classrooms, churches, and offices; "Everywhere hopelessness. A country without a purpose ... An industrious and intelligent people going to waste in idleness and despair."

For the LSR, the Depression was the inexorable result of laissez-faire philosophy. This philosophy had spread since the Act of Union 1840, which began a transition from power structures that favored aristocracy to structures that favored business. The responsible government arrived shortly after the union and shifted influence from the governor to ministers. Powers that had previously been focused on the governor, became divided among ministers. No meaningful administrative structures were implemented to ensure that ministers remained responsive to the public, and ministers aligned themselves with capitalists. Free market governance became the consort of free-market capitalization. Legislation regulating conflicts of interest did not exist, and politicians worked openly with business. One former prime minister made the marriage of business with politics strikingly clear when he stated "my politics are railroads." The developmental history of Canada's political economy was central in the analysis of the LSR, and they later observed that "[m]onopolies are not an unlucky accident in our economic system, they are our economic system."

Previous economic fluctuations had not created the need for federal unemployment programs, and policy and tradition dictated that assistance was a local issue, because traditionally it had been locally tractable. Under the British North America Act 1867 (BNA), the government received most revenue collection powers, and provinces became responsible for social relief, education, and health care. However, 60 years had passed since the BNA, and this was a different economy. The National Policy dramatically increased prairie populations, and when Depression hit, the prairies, in particular, could not manage social relief, and, along with other provinces, asked for federal aid. Federal politicians believed free markets would rebalance themselves, and refused assistance. Liberal Prime Minister William Lyon Mackenzie King refused to attempt relief, claiming it would endanger the national budget. Conservative Prime Minister Richard Bedford Bennett declared that provinces should reduce wasteful spending. Laissez-faire ideology underpinned the policies of Liberals and Conservatives alike. Provinces became disgruntled, relationships with Ottawa became strained, and so it was that the crisis of capitalism triggered a crisis of federalism. "Here was the proof that the [political economy] built by the businessman and the old party politician was defective. The men who had presided over the construction of a complex modern civilization apparently did not know how to keep it running smoothly."

== Moralism, intellectualism, and elitism: foundations of the LSR ==
In November 1930, the problems of political economy were the focus of discussion for a group of "radically minded [professors]", organized by the University of Toronto historian Frank Underhill. At the same time in Montreal, the legal scholar F. R. Scott was preparing a book examining the same problems. In August 1931, the two men met and discovered they had developed a similar analysis; instability and depression were born of a capitalistic political economy, and any permanent solution would be born of democratic socialism. Underhill proposed the formation of a research organization, styled after the British Fabians, modified to suit Canada. The organization's ideas would be spread in two ways; directly into the public mind through local associations and literature, and directly into government through an institution of intellectual elites that politicians could requisition to perform research and recommend policy. Scott agreed. Underhill also believed a socialist political party would shortly appear, and that there "should be a group of intellectuals that could provide the new party with a coherent platform." The men returned home, and Underhill established a group in Toronto while Scott did the same in Montreal.

These groups shared one important belief; that the objective study of social science yielded an inescapable conclusion: scientific socialism. Theirs was a scholarly disposition, and shared intellectualism aroused an elitist camaraderie. Educational distinction provided the group with a sense they were distinguished from the public and public servants; that amongst all reformists, they alone possessed the expertise necessary to develop corrective policies. The result was a highly principled and elitist political reformism, however, this reformism was not solely rationalistic in origin.

The twin inclinations of intellectual solidarity and moral solidarity motivated these academics. They were endowed not only with higher education, but also a belief in a higher purpose. Moralism was important to the group and had been engendered through lifelong religious association. Though not all members remained religious in adulthood, most had been influenced by religion since their youth. A partial survey of the league's leading members reveals the following; Frank Underhill: Flavelle scholar, raised a Presbyterian; F. R. Scott: Rhodes scholar, son of an archdeacon; Eugene Forsey: Rhodes scholar, son of a Methodist clergyman; Eric A. Havelock: respected economist, Christian Socialist; David Lewis: Rhodes scholar, a secular Jew, but deeply influenced by the Social Gospel and the Jewish Labour Movement. Artists who were among its early members included Jean Palardy and Jori Smith, both of Montreal.

Three important commonalities stood out among the LSR's founding members. Religion imbued an indelible morality; war and urbanization prompted sober reflection on suffering and reform, and modern education in the social sciences produced a propensity for rational analysis and a deterministic bent.

Scott and Underhill's groups exchanged drafts for a manifesto, attempting to strike a balance between pragmatism and radicalism. Their goal was to motivate all Canadians to critically examine Canada's political economy, and because the group did not want radicalism scaring potential members away, they opted to avoid the inclusion of the one word that best explained their politics: socialism. Drafts were exchanged for many months, and eventually, a meeting was scheduled in Toronto, for February 23, 1932. Seventy-five men and women attended the meeting, ratified the manifesto, and discussed the selection of a name. The Montreal group suggested the "League for Economic Democracy", however, the winning moniker came from the Torontonians, and when proceedings concluded the League for Social Reconstruction was born.

== Social planning: the CCF and the Royal Commission ==
Later in 1932, the socialist party Underhill predicted materialized as the CCF. The CCF were social democrats and held the same ideas as the LSR regarding state theory, and hence the CCF was the LSR's best option for access to parliament. The CCF was also the best option for another reason: J. S. Woodsworth, honorary president of the LSR, was also the leader of the CCF. Because the LSR had been established outside the political system, the question was how to structure the relationship between the league and the CCF on the stated goal of education, and it was not clear they would stay if the LSR became the organ of a political party. Woodsworth proposed a solution for members of the LSR who desired affiliation; CCF Clubs. Club membership brought affiliation, and LSR members could thus affiliate with the CCF independently of affiliation with the LSR. The LSR was thus able to move forward as an independent research organization.

To promote and improve their ideas, the league discussed political economy with intellectuals and politicians across the nation. The LSR believed that because the Depression was national, its solution would be national as well, and they found sympathetic analyses amongst the intellectual community. Intellectuals concerned with social reform began to contemplate national reform. Common ground between the LSR and intellectual elites provided a program for action. Intellectuals felt that they needed to convince Canadians that government should assume an interventionist role; financial and social policies should be implemented at the national level, and stability would flow top downwards. Such an arrangement was not however possible under the BNA, and accordingly, the constitution would require modification.

By the mid-1930s, many modern intellectuals found work in government, and political bodies began to seek advice from extra-parliamentary intellectuals. In 1935, extra-political intellectual elites were included in a national conference on Dominion-provincial relations, however, the conference's primary purpose was to stop the flow of federal money to provinces, which was not what intellectuals had in mind. The initiatives put into place after the conference proved unproductive, and the movement was transmuted into the Royal Commission on Dominion-Provincial Relations. The Commission was placed under the control of modern social scientists, including LSR member Frank Scott, and was instructed to provide recommendations for securing the economy and the federation. In 1940, the Commission reported that the Depression resulted from problems in the definition of the Canadian Dominion; the BNA had developed in the context of a wheat-timber-fish economy, and could not support Canada's mixed industrializing economy. Industrial growth had increased the complication of economic activity, but the political system had not made corresponding advancements. To solve the Depression, the taxation powers and fiscal responsibilities of the federal and provincial governments required readjustment. The government should control all unemployment insurance programs, assume all provincial debts, collect all income taxes, and make equalization payments to needy provinces.

Premiers met the Prime Minister in 1941 to discuss the recommendations, and with war raging in Europe, the Premiers agreed to the Commission's proposals. After the war, Prime Minister King was eager to preserve the government's new powers, and a separate agreement was reached with the provinces, making the Commission's recommendations into a permanent policy. Politicians of all stripes were eager to mitigate against the economic and social problems experienced after World War One, and acceded to the implementation of central planning measures. Reflecting on the Commission, historian Doug Owram noted that the report "was not so much the product of the public hearings as ... of the intellectual network of the 1930s... Indeed, the results of the study had been conceived even before its appointment." The report itself became a vehicle for sharing data in such a fashion that it supported the conclusions of the intellectuals who wrote it, with an eye towards converting its readers into advocates of centralization.

The ideas of the LSR proved instrumental in introducing successful social planning measures into government, however disenchantment with socialism had grown as World War Two approached, and the LSR itself was reduced to the point of dissolution. With CCF related activities expanding, the league finally disbanded in 1942. In the mid-1940s two members of the LSR held prominent positions within the CCF: Frank Scott became the National Chairman, and Professor George M. A. Grube became the president of the Ontario CCF.

== Publications ==
The LSR made its views known through the magazine New Commonwealth (formerly the Farmer's Sun, publication of the United Farmers of Ontario until purchased by Graham Spry). The group further contributed to Canada's political and intellectual fields with two books, Social Planning for Canada (1935) and Democracy Needs Socialism (1938). Canadian Forum was saved from bankruptcy by the LSR, which was acquired in the journal in 1936 and continued its publication. With these texts, social and economic change policies were popularized.

== See also ==
- Douglas–Coldwell Foundation
- New Democratic Party
- Social democracy
