= United Brotherhood of Railway Employees =

Former trade union of the United States

- Merged into: Industrial Workers of the World
- Founded: 1898 (Canada); 1901 (America)
- Dissolved: 1905
- Location: Canada
- Members: Railway workers
- Key people: William Gault (Canada); George Estes (US)
- Affiliations: American Labor Union

The United Brotherhood of Railway Employees (UBRE) was an industrial labor union established in Canada in 1898, and a separate union established in Oregon in 1901. The two combined in 1902. The union signed up lesser-skilled railway clerks and laborers, but had the ambition of representing all railway workers regardless of trade. The Canadian Pacific Railway (CPR) was determined to break the UBRE and provoked a major strike in Vancouver in 1903. The CPR used strikebreakers, spies and secret police to break the strike. The crafts brotherhoods of engineers, conductors, firemen and brakemen would not support the UBRE. The strike failed, and the UBRE disintegrated over the next year.

== Canadian union ==
The last local of the American Railway Union (ARU) in Winnipeg dissolved in 1897. The UBRE was formed in Winnipeg in September 1898, presumably to fill the gap. At first, membership was limited to a small number of fairly skilled Canadian Pacific Railway (CPR) workers without a union, including yardmen, bridgemen and some classes of track repairer. It was not recognized by the CPR and had no contract with the railway. The UBRE was low profile in its early years, but in 1901 they started to organize the low-paid CPR freight handlers and clerks in Winnipeg. The new activism may have been the result of the appointment of William Gault as the new Master of the union. The UBRE affiliated with the Winnipeg Trades Council at the end of 1901. The goal was to organize all railway employees into one union, regardless of their skill, so that as William Gault said they would be "not brothers in name only, but brothers indeed."

== American union ==
=== Establishment ===
Early in 1900, the Southern Pacific Railroad had established a company relief department which had taken automatic deductions from the wages of the Southern Pacific's employees, causing great discontent. Representatives of the various job categories on the Southern Pacific held a series of meetings which had chosen delegates to attend a general meeting at San Francisco early in April of that year. George Estes, of Roseburg, Oregon, was chosen as the chairman of this railway general grievance committee, which served as the direct forerunner of the UBRE.

In December 1900, a strike of the Order of Railroad Telegraphers, involving 800 employees of the Santa Fe Railroad, erupted. The Santa Fe, lines of which closely paralleled the Southern Pacific in California, was abandoned by other railway craft brotherhoods in its effort to win redress; this disaffection, combined with the ongoing organizing efforts of the employees of the Southern Pacific, inspired the formation of a new railway union encompassing members from all railway job classifications. The organization was launched at a January 1901 meeting of eight railway workers representing the various crafts. A provisional constitution and bylaws were prepared for the new union, to be called the United Brotherhood of Railway Employees (UBRE), and George Estes was elected as the union's first president.

=== Development ===
George Estes in 1903.

Estes' UBRE was founded to create a union that would "bring all classes of actual railway employees in closer contact with each other, for their mutual benefit and improvement." It proposed to take a moderate approach to dealing with employers, and to avoid any political affiliation. A similar union had been formed in San Francisco, the Railway Employees Amalgamated Association. The two unions combined with headquarters in San Francisco, using the UBRE name.

The UBRE tried to meet a need for representation for the less skilled railway workers. The running trades – engineers, brakemen, firemen, and conductors – were represented by crafts brotherhoods. They were well paid, and the railways gave them good treatment because of the responsibility of their jobs. The less skilled laborers, track maintenance crews and freight handlers had worse conditions and no representation.

The UBRE tried unsuccessfully to take over the organization of the Order of Railroad Telegraphers (ORT) on the Southern Pacific. Estes was expelled from the ORT as a result.

Early in 1902, the UBRE applied to the American Federation of Labor (AF of L) for a charter, but was refused on the grounds that the UBRE would compete with the existing railway brotherhoods.

After the AF of L rebuttal, the UBRE moved to the left and start to negotiate with the American Labor Union (ALU), a recently founded rival to the AFL associated with the Socialist Party of America. The UBRE did not formally become an ALU affiliate until April 1903.

The ALU and the UBRE were threatening to businesses because workers were organized by industry rather than skill. One union could close down a company.

Estes told an audience in Winnipeg that the UBRE "has been designed to meet the needs of the hour; ... it meets concentration and consolidation of the part of capital, with the same policy for labor and nothing short of this will protect you."

Gompers told the Trades and Labour Congress (TLC) he viewed the UBRE as "inimical to the interests of the working people everywhere.

== Merger ==
The Canadian and American unions combined, and on 25 April 1902 the Winnipeg-based UBRE became Division #70 of the American UBRE. In late April 1902 two UBRE members had been dismissed by the CPR, allegedly for union activity, and William Gault was also threatened with dismissal unless he cut his ties with the union. Instead he resigned from the CPR and accepted the position of UBRE vice-president for Canada. In May 1902 The Voice, a labor newspaper in Winnipeg, optimistically said that the new union would "foster education and dispel ignorance, raise wages and lower expenses, shorten hours and lengthen life, increase independence and decrease dependence." The UBRE gradually established new locals in Canada during 1902. They were founded in turn in Toronto, Vancouver, Calgary, Revelstoke and Nelson.

== 1902 strike ==
In May 1902 the machinists of the Canadian National Railway went on strike in Winnipeg for higher wages and union recognition. They failed to get support from the other railway crafts unions. Estes arrived in Winnipeg on 9 June 1902, and at a public meeting two days later announced that the UBRE was going to launch a drive to organize on the CNR, and "carry through the movement for higher wages which was recently begun by the machinists of the road." The UBRE went on strike against the CNR on 30 June 1902, with about 220 employees including wipers, switchmen, trackmen, freight handlers, clerks and cleaning staff – almost all the employees other than the conductors, engineers, firemen and brakemen who operated the trains. The CNR brought in strikebreakers, but now had to deal with the brotherhoods, who had held back from supporting the UBRE but were now threatening to strike.

The outcome was an agreement on 15 July 1902 in which the brotherhoods gained recognition from the CNR, while the UBRE strikers were left without jobs. At the September 1902 annual convention of the Dominion Trades and Labour Congress (TLC) the UBRE delegates from Manitoba bitterly denounced the leaders of the brotherhoods, but did not gain support from the TLC. The effect of the strike and the TLC response was to increase dissatisfaction with the TLC and craft unions and assist expansion of the UBRE and ALU in western Canada. On 1 August 1902 the Winnipeg Trades and Labour Council voted 35 to 5 to place the CNR on its "unfair" list. The strike was not formally ended until a settlement was reached on 24 January 1903, but the CNR refused to recognize the UBRE.

== 1903 strike ==
By the start of 1903 the UBRE had not managed to achieve its goal of representing all crafts, and was limited to trades such as clerks, freight handlers, laborers and store workers who were not covered by any of the craft unions. The CPR vowed to "spend a million dollars to kill the UBRE". The connection between the UBRE and the Western Federation of Miners (WFM), both ALU affiliates, was another issue for the CPR, since industrial action by the WFM was preventing the CPR from realizing the full value of its investment in branch lines serving the mines. The CPR managed to subvert Harold V. Poore, the main organizer of the UBRE, with a combination of bribery and blackmail. From January to April 1903, when he died of scarlet fever, Poore gave the CPR copies of all the UBRE's confidential correspondence.

The CPR provoked a UBRE strike on 27 February 1903 by the unfair dismissal of a clerk. Even before the strike started, the CPR had imported strike breakers from central Canada, and later brought in strike breakers from the United States without any objection by the immigration officials. 154 employees were affected, mostly clerks. The CPR refused to negotiate and announced that all the strikers had been fired for leaving work without notice. The UBRE called out CPR freight handlers at the Vancouver docks. Other groups walked out in sympathy or refused to handle CPR freight, including longshoremen, CPR ship crews, telegraph messengers and teamsters. The UBRE called out its members in Nelson and Revelstoke. On 9 March 1903 forty five CPR employees went on strike in Calgary, asking for recognition of the UBRE. The strike spread to Winnipeg. In the end about 1,000 western CPR employees were on strike. Efforts by the Vancouver Board of Trade to end the strike were rejected by CPR. On 11 March 1903 the Western Federation of Miners went on strike at the Dunsmuir coal mines on Vancouver Island. The UBRE claimed the strike was in solidarity. The real motive of the coal strike was to gain recognition of the WFM and to stop dismissals of miners for belonging to a union.

The craft brotherhoods refused to support the UBRE, forced members who had struck in sympathy to return to work, and instructed their other members to remain one the job. Joseph Watson, head of the Vancouver boilermakers local, ordered his members not to join sympathy strikes and agitated against the UBRE, ALU and socialists in the press and in public meetings. The president of the Boilermakers' Union in the US said any members who went on strike in sympathy with the UBRE would be thrown out of the union. The socialist journalist George Weston Wrigley claimed that some of the crafts union members "scabbed" on the striking Freight Handlers and Office Employees. The CPR continued to run trains during the strike, distributed a pamphlet that called the UBRE a "dishonest and traitorous organization", and called its leaders "a set of revolutionists."

In mid-April Frank Rogers, a well-known labor leader, was shot during an argument between strikers and CPR agents, and later died. The brotherhoods did not send representatives to his funeral procession. After Rogers' death two men were arrested. One was tried, and he was acquitted. Pro-labor observers said the trial was a farce. The UBRE's Strike Bulletin merged with the Clarion of Nanaimo and the Western Socialist published by Richard Parmater Pettipiece, and appeared as the Western Clarion on 8 May 1903. Pettipiece wrote of the CPR's use of spies and secret police that, "nowhere else in the British Empire would such a condition be possible, and it has seldom been equalled anywhere in the long and painful history of the tragedy of labor." George Estes was arrested in Victoria on a flimsy charge of inciting the crew of a steamship to disrupt mail service, and was held for three weeks before the charges were dropped.

By late May the UBRE leadership had accepted they could not win the strike. A confidential agreement was reached on 12 June 1903. The CPR refused to allow its clerks to be unionized on the grounds that they had access to confidential information. The CPR agreed to pay wages they had owed to strikers before the strike began, and to stop legal proceedings against the strikers. The CPR would not guarantee re-employment, and would not recognize the UBRE. In a confidential note the CPR said it would fire any UBRE members, but did not in fact take this step. On 27 June 1903 a majority of strikers agreed to accept the CPR terms and the UBRE declared the strike ended. 600 members of several different unions had walked out in support of the UBRE freight handlers and clerks, in British Columbia's "first great sympathy strike". The sympathy strike had cost 38,075 striker days. Another outcome of the strike was the formation of the Employer's Association of Vancouver, founded in May 1903 with the purpose of presenting a united front by employers against future industrial action.

== Later events ==
In April 1903 a royal commission was set up to investigate the crisis, composed of B.C. Chief Justice Gordon Hunter, the Reverend E.S. Rowe and William Lyon Mackenzie King as secretary.

The commission detected a conspiracy against the B.C. economy directed by foreign agitators. The commission's report said that the UBRE, ALU and Western Federation of Miners were foreign, socialist organizations out to destroy the legitimate and responsible craft unions and damage the western economy.

The commission recommended that unions be incorporated and held liable for damages. Anyone other than a British subject who incited or led a strike could be jailed. Boycotts, "unfair" lists and "scab" lists should be outlawed.

The Calgary Bond of Brotherhood, a socialist newspaper, said in a 1903 year-end review that most strikers had been blacklisted. It said "the brotherhood is completely destroyed in Canada with the exception of the division in Winnipeg.

The office of Canadian vice-president was dropped in May 1904 at the UBRE biennial convention in San Francisco. The organization also decided at that time to relocate its headquarters from San Francisco to Chicago, a more central location, and George Estes was re-elected President of the organization.

The UBRE had lost most its US members by the end of 1904. At the start of 1905 the only remaining UBRE local in Canada was that in Winnipeg. The Industrial Workers of the World (IWW) held its founding convention in June 1905, at which it reported that the UBRE had just 2,087 members.

George Estes did not attend the IWW convention, and seems to have left the labor movement.

== Sources ==
- Caragata, Warren (1979-01-01). Alberta Labour: A Heritage Untold. James Lorimer & Company. ISBN 978-0-88862-264-8.
- Leier, Mark (2013-09-05). Rebel Life (2nd ed.): The Life and Times of Robert Gosden, Revolutionary, Mystic, Labour Spy. New Star Books. ISBN 978-1-55420-058-0.
- McCormack, A. Ross (1991). Reformers, Rebels, and Revolutionaries: The Western Canadian Radical Movement 1899-1919. University of Toronto Press. ISBN 978-0-8020-7682-3.
- McDonald, Robert A.J. (2011-11-01). Making Vancouver: Class, Status, and Social Boundaries, 1863-1913. UBC Press. ISBN 978-0-7748-4227-3.
- Milne, J. M. (1973). "History of the Socialist Party of Canada" (PDF). World Socialist Movement.
- Tuck, J. Hugh (1983). "The United Brotherhood of Railway Employees in western Canada, 1898-1905". Labour / Le Travail. 11. doi:10.2307/25140201. JSTOR 25140201.
