= Socialist Party of Canada =

Political party in Canada (1904–1925)

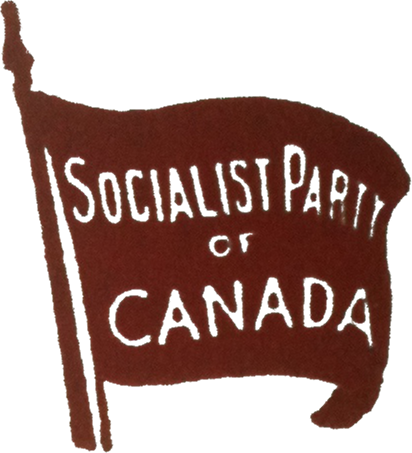
- Abbreviation: SPC
- Leader: E.T. Kingsley
- Founder: E.T. Kingsley
- Founded: 1904
- Dissolved: 1925
- Merger of: Socialist Party of British Columbia, Socialist Party of Ontario, Socialist Party of Manitoba, Canadian Socialist League
- Headquarters: Victoria, British Columbia
- Newspaper: Western Clarion (1903–1918, 1920–1925), The Red Flag (1919)
- Ideology: Socialism; Classical Marxism; Impossibilism
- International affiliation: World Socialist Movement
- Colours: Red

The Socialist Party of Canada (SPC) was a political party that existed from 1904 to 1925, led by E. T. Kingsley. It published the newspaper, Western Clarion. SPC members were elected as MLAs in BC, Alberta and Manitoba, prior to 1930.

== History ==
=== Establishment ===
The Socialist Party of Canada was founded at the Socialist Party of British Columbia's fourth annual convention on December 30–31, 1904. Delegates at the convention were urged to consider organizing the nucleus of a federal party, noting the acceptance of the platform with socialist parties and organizations in other provinces. Socialist organizations quickly approved the party formation, and the new party executive met for the first time on February 19, 1905.

The party, which had a revolutionary Marxist orientation, called for the overturn of the capitalist system through militant political action. Given this goal, compromise through trade unionism and limited political reforms was rejected.

=== Party manifesto and membership ===
The party's manifesto, which went through five editions by 1920, was its most influential and widely read publication. The manifesto traced the history of class struggle and the exploitation of labour, concluding that:

Out of these conditions has arisen the Socialist Party of Canada, the nucleus of the revolt of the slaves of Canada against capitalism. Its policy is to educate the slaves of Canada to an understanding of their position and organize them for concerted political action, to the end that they may wrest the powers of State from the hands of capital, and use them to strip the master class of its property rights in the means of production and to make these the collective property of the producers.

The SPC platform similarly called for socialization of the means of production:

Therefore, we call upon all workers to organise under the banner of the Socialist Party of Canada with the object of conquering the public powers, for the purpose of setting up and enforcing the economic program of the working class as follows:

1. The transformation, as rapidly as possible, of capitalist property in the means of wealth production (natural resources, factories, mills, railroads, etc.) into the collective property of the working class.

2. The organisation and management of industry by the working class.

3. The establishment, as speedily as possible, of production for use instead of production for profit.

The SPC was structured as a network of local organizations, each conducting education and propaganda in their respective communities. Provincial-level executives coordinated these activities in British Columbia, Alberta, Ontario, Manitoba, and the Maritimes. The governing Dominion Executive Committee was headquartered in British Columbia and consisted almost entirely of BC residents.

Although a national convention was never held, E.T. Kingsley was regarded as the movement's leader until about 1912. The foremost exponent of Impossibilism, Kingsley called for a social revolution to redistribute wealth through political organization, education, and propaganda.

While the party's platform was Marxist, its membership was diverse. Besides Marxists, there were social democrats, militant trade unionists, and left-leaning federations of Ukrainians, Finns, Letts, and Jews. Ultimately, the varying factions did not coalesce and schisms occurred, including such breakaway formations as the Social Democratic Party of Canada and the Socialist Party of North America.

Nevertheless, the SPC was Canada's third largest political party until the outbreak of the First World War. It also enjoyed some success at the provincial electoral level, with SPC deputies and elected members sponsoring legislation that addressed health, safety and other worker concerns.

=== Provincial electoral participation ===
The SPC was strongest in British Columbia where it won seats in the province's legislature from 1903 to 1912. In the provincial election of 1907, the SPC garnered over 5,000 votes. The apex was the 1909 election, when it collected more than 11,000 votes — about 22 percent of the total votes cast in the seats contested and 11 percent overall. The SPC elected two in 1909 – James Hurst Hawthornthwaite and Parker Williams.

During the 1903–1912 period, the leadership of the Vancouver Trades and Labor Council consisted of committed SPC members who also played a role in stymying efforts to establish a rival labour party. However, the party went into decline after disappointing federal election results in 1911 and the resignation of provincial house leader Hawthornthwaite, over his involvement in land speculation. The one SPC MLA elected in the 1912 election, Parker Williams, defected to the Liberal Party in 1914.

In 1909, SPC member Charlie O'Brien was elected to the Alberta legislature. A speech on socialism he gave in the Legislature was transcribed and published as The Proletarian in Politics (1910). In the 1913 election, incumbent SPC MLA Charlie O'Brien and SPC members Alf Budden (author of "The Slave of the Farm"), Joe Knight, H.R. Burge, and Thomas Smith ran as candidates, all unsuccessfully. In the 1917 Alberta provincial campaign, Joe Knight, J. Reid, G. Paton, S.R. Keeling and H. Thomas ran as SPC candidates. None of them were elected.

In Manitoba, the Manitoba branch of the SPC was initially a rival to Winnipeg's reform labour groups. It may also have been responsible for the defeat of centrist labour candidate Fred Dixon in the election of 1910. The resulting backlash from trade unions weakened the SPC for years. In 1920, SPC activist George Armstrong was elected by Winnipeg voters to serve in the Legislative Assembly of Manitoba. However, he was defeated in 1922 due in part to opposition from Communist Party politicians.

=== World War I and its aftermath ===
Cover of a Socialist Party of Canada pamphlet published during World War I due to the federal government's ban of the US publisher, Charles H. Kerr & Co.

The SPC paid a heavy price for its opposition to Canadian entry into the world war including harassment and intimidation from government authorities. Individual members were also targeted, including Ginger Goodwin, who died at the hands of police in 1918 while evading conscription.

In the fall of 1918 Western Clarion was banned by the federal government. On January 11, 1919, a new publication called The Red Flag was launched by the SPC to work around the proscription of its predecessor. The first issue noted the state's interference with the postal service and its censorship of party correspondence:

The official organ has been suppressed... Leaflets mailed have been confiscated and complaints ignored. Almost every letter which arrives at this office bears unmistakable signs of having been opened, though no censorship mark to that effect is on them. All such letters are unduly delayed, being some four, five and six weeks in the mails before delivery....

Moreover, letters and parcels which we have dispatched have failed to reach their destination. The mail of individual party members also suffers from the same despicable secret censorship. Our protests and complaints to heads of departments result only in officially equivocal and evasive replies.

The ban was lifted in 1920.

In the wake of the Russian Revolution and the Winnipeg General Strike, a number of the SPC's supporters became attracted to Bolshevism and the ideas of Lenin and Trotsky. Others gravitated toward an evolutionary or gradualist socialist position.

SPC members, notably George Armstrong and William Pritchard, were among the strike leaders put on trial following the Winnipeg confrontation.

In 1919, SPC members, including Pritchard, were instrumental in founding One Big Union in Canada.

In 1920, a split occurred when many of the party's members left to join the Federated Labour Party, which had been formed by the British Columbia Federation of Labour. Others joined the labour and independent labour parties that were being formed across the country.

In 1921, most of the Marxist SPC members left to join the Workers Party, which was the public face of the nascent Communist Party of Canada.

In 1925, the Socialist Party of Canada formally disbanded. Many of the remaining members joined the Independent Labour Party.

== Federal election results from 1904 to 1926 ==
=== General elections ===
Year	SPC Candidates	Votes	Popular vote
1904 federal election	3	1,794	0.18%
1908 federal election	5	6,071	0.52%
1911 federal election	6	4,574	0.35%
1921 federal election	1	3,094	0.10%
1925 federal election	1	1,888	0.06%
1926 federal election	1	672	0.02%

== SPC Publications ==
- Socialism, Revolution and Internationalism. Gabriel Deville. 1893/1907. Also published in the SPC's Red Flag series, no. 1.
- Platform 1904 (Weinrich, Social Protest from the Left in Canada 1870–1970 A Bibliography. no. 346)
- Toronto municipal elections 1906, Manifesto 1906 (Weinrich, Social Protest from the Left in Canada 1870–1970 A Bibliography. no. 367)
- Manifesto Toronto municipal elections 1907 1907 (Weinrich 386)
- Ontario provincial elections June 8, 1908, Manifesto of Toronto local. 1906 (Weinrich 404)
- Manifesto Toronto municipal elections Jam. 1 1909 1909 (Weinrich 421)
- Manifesto of the Socialist Party of Canada. 1st edition, 1910. 4th edition, 1916. 5th edition, 1920.
- Constitution and Bylaws of the Socialist Party of Canada. 1910.
- The Proletarian in Politics-- – the Socialist position as defended by C.M. O'Brien, MLA in the Alberta Legislature. Charlie O'Brien. 1910.
- The Struggle for Existence. Gerald Desmond. 1911.
- Socialism and Unionism. Donald G. McKenzie. 1911.
- What is Socialism? W. E. Hardenburg. 1912.
- The Way to Power. J. B. Osborne. 1913.
- Wage Worker and Farmer. J. Pilkington. 1914.
- The Slave of the Farm. Alf Budden. 1910? and 1914/1918.
- Economic Causes of War. Peter T. Leckie, reprinted from The Western Clarion, March–November, 1920.
- Declaration of principles c1920 (Weinrich 872)
- Platform and constitution, and brief sketch of the evolution of society 1920 (Weinrich 874)
- Manifesto and declaration of principles, municipal campaign 1932 (Vancouver) 1932 (Weinrich 1472)
- The industrial union – the revolutionary weapon c1934 (Weinrich 1661)
- The Socialist manifesto (Winnipeg) 1944 (Weinrich 2820)
- series of leaflets – The socialist (no. 1); The capitalist (no. 2); The worker (no. 3); Class struggle (no. 4); Depression (no. 5); Politics (no. 6); Wages (no. 7); World worth while (no. 8); Charity (no. 9); 1952; reissued 1958–59 (Weinrich 3653–3662)
- Free! The best of everything you may want, need or desire... (Victoria) 1963 (Weinrich 4385)

== Bibliography ==
- Angus, Ian. 2006. "A Party of A New Type: The Socialist Party of Canada and the Birth of Canadian Communism." Marxism: A Socialist Annual 4: 66–74.
- Campbell, Peter. 1992. "'Making Socialists': Bill Pritchard, the Socialist Party of Canada, and the Third International." Labour/Le Travail 30: 45–63.
- Campbell, Peter. 2000. Canadian Marxists and the Search for a Third Way. McGill-Queen's University Press.
- Campbell, Peter. 2021. "Let Us Rise: Dialectical Thinking, the Commodification of Labour Power, and the Legacy of the Socialist Party of Canada." Labour/Le Travail 87: 93–120.
- Frank, David, and Nolan Reilly. 1979. "The Emergence of the Socialist Movement in the Maritimes, 1899–1916." Labour/Le Travail 4: 85–92, 94–113.
- Friesen, Gerald. 1976. "'Yours in Revolt': The Socialist Party of Canada and the Western Canadian Labour Movement." Labour/Le Travail 1: 139–57.
- Kawecki, Adam T. 1980. Canadian Socialism and the Origin of the Communist Party of Canada, 1900–1922. MA thesis. McMaster University.
- Malhotra, Ravi, and Benjamin Islett. 2021. Able to Lead: Disablement, Radicalism, and the Political Life of E.T. Kingsley. UBC Press.
- Martynowich, Orest T. 1977. "The Ukrainian Socialist Movement in Canada." Journal of Ukrainian Studies 1: no. 1, 27–44 (Part 1); 2: no. 1, 22–31 (Part 2).
- McCormack, A. Ross. 1977. Reformers, Rebels and Revolutionaries: The Western Canadian Radical Movement 1899–1919. University of Toronto Press.
- McKay, Ian. 2008. Reasoning Otherwise: Leftists and the People's Enlightenment in Canada,1890–1920. Between the Lines.
- Milne, J.M. (Jim). 1973. "History of the Socialist Party of Canada.". Socialist History Project. 39 pages.
- Newell, Peter E. 2008. The Impossibilists: A Brief Profile of the Socialist Party of Canada. Athena Press.
- Robin, Martin. 1968. Radical Politics and Canadian Labour. Queen's University, Industrial Relations Centre.
- Troop, George R. 1922. Socialism in Canada. MA thesis. McGill University.
