= Edith Hancox =

- Born: Edith Eliza Gales Angell; August 8, 1874; Calne, Wiltshire, England
- Died: June 3, 1954 (aged 79); Winnipeg, Manitoba, Canada
- Years active: 1918–1928
- Spouses: William Henry Chamberlain (m. 1900; died 1912) William John Hancox (m. 1913)
- Children: 3

Edith Hancox (1874–1954) was a British-born Canadian socialist feminist and journalist. She was a prominent figure in the 1919 Winnipeg general strike.

== Early life ==
Edith Eliza Gales Angell was born on August 8, 1874, in Calne in Wiltshire, England. Her eighteen-year-old unmarried mother, Eliza Angell, was a domestic servant. Her father, Norman Gales, abandoned both Edith and her mother. When Edith was four, Eliza married. Edith worked as a child servant until December 1900, when she married William Henry Chamberlain. Edith bore two sons, Harry and Arthur.

The family moved to Canada in May 1904, Edith as a soldier for the Salvation Army. Edith and William operated a boarding house near the Central Freighthouse until May 1910 when the duo opened a second-hand furniture store. William Chamberlain died in 1912 after a nine-month battle with cancer. Now a single mother of two, Edith began taking in boarders, including William John Hancox (1881–1955), originally from Essex. She married Hancox in April 1913, giving birth to their daughter Jeannie in January 1915.

== Activism and politics ==
Though Hancox originally arrived in Canada working with the Salvation Army, she quickly became critical of their movement. Shortly after the 1918 formation of the Labor Church, Hancox began attending sermons on gender equality and worker emancipation, eventually preaching critiques of the capitalist patriarchy at church sermons.

Under the guidance of Helen Armstrong, Hancox formed the Weston and Booklands branch of the Women's Labour League. Between 1918 and 1928, Hancox wrote at least 40 letters and articles including for the OBU Bulletin and the Communist Worker. Her writings and speeches often used the language of first wave maternal feminism.

Beginning with her first speech on June 1, 1919, Hancox addressed pro-strike crowds at several times at Victoria Park that summer. She was the only woman known to have addressed pro-strike crowds at there. During the general strike, Hancox continued her involvement with the Labor Church. In the aftermath of "bloody Saturday," Hancox and her four-year-old daughter, Jeannie, presented a petition demanding the release of the eight strike leaders to Edward VIII at the Manitoba Legislature on September 10. Bail was granted to the leaders that evening.

In the fall of 1919, Hancox ran unsuccessfully for the city school board. In 1921, then-mayor Edward Parnell offered Hancox a seat on the Winnipeg Joint Committee on Unemployment. In 1921, she was elected secretary of the Winnipeg Central Council of the Unemployed. Hancox was an active member of One Big Union (OBU) until June 1922, when she stepped down to join the Worker's Party. She ran unsuccessfully city council in Ward Two with the Workers’ Party in 1923. She placed last out of eight candidates.

As a delegate for the Women's Labour League, Hancox participated in the 1924 pan-left Labor Women's Social and Economic Conference. She fought to emancipate women workers and, with other women's labour activists, forced the city of Winnipeg to offer a female-only relief office every winter for the entirety of the postwar depression.

== Personal life ==
After 1928, Hancox largely disappeared from the public record. In September 1929, while dealing with increasing health issues, she defaulted on her mortgage, losing her business and home, which had also served as her organizing base. Hancox died on June 3, 1954, at age 79 in Winnipeg.
