= 1916 Hamilton machinists' strike =

Hamilton machinists' strike
- Date: June 12 – July 22, 1916
- Location: Hamilton, Ontario, Canada
- Goals: Reduced working hours and improved wages
- Methods: Striking

The 1916 Hamilton machinists' strike was a labour dispute in Hamilton, Ontario, Canada involving between 1,500 and 2,000 workers employed in the manufacturing of munitions and other materials for World War I. It began on June 12 and involved those employed at all of the major manufacturers, including the National Steel Car Company, the Steel Company of Canada, Dominion Steel Foundry, Canadian Westinghouse Electric & Manufacturing Company, Fensom Elevators. Involving members of the International Association of Machinists, Amalgamated Society of Engineers, and unorganized workers, it ended in defeat for Hamilton's machinists.

== Context ==
Industrial production in Hamilton and across Canada was relatively low prior to the outbreak of World War I, with many factories in the city running at reduced capacity or shut down entirely. However, the beginning of the war and the recognition by governments that the conflict would not end quickly, Canadian industrialists like Joseph Flavelle received massive government contracts to produce munitions for the war effort. The Trades and Labor Congress of Canada endorsed the war at its 1914 convention and prominent union leaders such as TLC president James C. Watters and Tom Moore lobbied the government of Prime Minister Robert Borden for the creation of a permanent Fair Wage Board. Such a board would have set wage-rates and conditions in war-related industries. Borden, Flavelle, and other government officials ignored the TLC's lobbying and declined to establish a mechanism for settling disputes during the war. Workers in war industries faced long hours, dangerous working conditions, and a rapidly increasing cost of living.

Though the war led to an overall decline in union membership across Canada but not in Hamilton, which was a major hub of munitions production. Canadian membership in the US-based International Association of Machinists rose during this period from 4,654 in 1914 to 7,108 in 1916. Despite behind the scenes pledges from trade union leaders that workers would not go on strike, rank-and-file machinists struck on several occasions. In late 1915, machinists in Toronto won an increase in their wages without going on strike. These improvements included a 50-hour work week and increased wages across the board.

To win improvements similar to those won in nearby Toronto, 400 workers employed by the Steel Company of Canada went on strike in mid-February 1916. However, the strike was unsuccessful and the workers were forced to return to the company by the end of the month without improvements. Vocal IAM members also faced discrimination from employers. In April, IAM local 414 sent notice to city munitions manufacturers that the union sought the same pay and hours as Toronto as well as the closed shop. Hamilton's branch of The Canadian Manufacturers' Association was united in opposition to this proposal.

== Strike ==
In April, a royal commission sided with labour and encouraged the adoption of a nine-hour work day and increases in wages for machinists. However, employers steadfastly opposed this measure and, on June 12, between 1,500 and 2,000 Hamilton machinists went on strike. It was the largest labour dispute in the city's history. Soon after the strike began, workers in Toronto expressed solidarity with Hamilton's strikers and pledged a general strike if a 50-hour work week was not guaranteed to all workers in both cities. However, IAM officials assured the public, including employers, that no such strike would take place. By the second week of the strike, government officials began demanding the censorship of news about the strike, including a total ban on newspaper coverage. This was intended to prevent similar walkouts across the country. Many strikers left Hamilton for Toronto, where improved conditions had already been won. During the strike's 5th week, ASE members voted to return to work, charging that IAM's membership had deserted the strike. In actuality, ASE was a branch of a union headquartered in the United Kingdom and its leadership had pledged not to strike during the war. By July 22, all but 100 machinists had either found work elsewhere or returned to their previous positions.

== Impact ==
Despite formally winning the strike, Imperial Munitions Board chairman Joseph Flavelle noted that munitions manufacturers "suffered severely," primarily because many machinists had left the city to work elsewhere and thereby dramatically reduced their labour supply. However, this did not lead to an increase in living conditions for those who stayed behind, which remained far below those found elsewhere in the region. Overall, the failed strike led to a decline in organized labour in the city, with the open shop being the default position of employers. Likewise, workers elsewhere in Canada protested, such as during the 1919 Winnipeg General Strike, Hamilton's workers did not join in their protests.
