= Claude Jodoin =

Canadian trade unionist and politician

Claude Jodoin OC
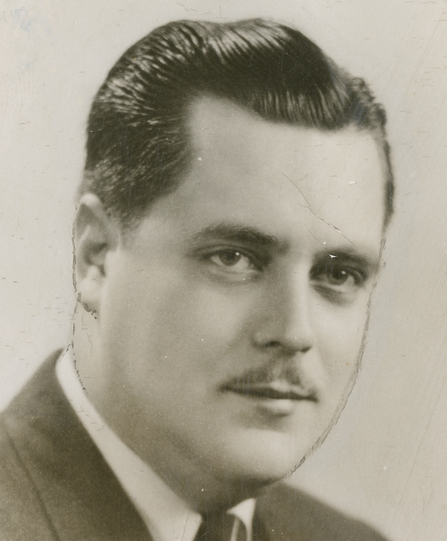

President of the Canadian Labour Congress
- In office 1956–1968
- Preceded by: none
- Succeeded by: Donald MacDonald
- Constituency: Canada

President of Trades and Labour Congress of Canada
- In office 1954–1956
- Preceded by: Percy Bengough
- Succeeded by: none

Member of the Legislative Assembly of Quebec
- In office 23 March 1942 – 1944
- Preceded by: Joseph-Romeo Toupin (Liberal Party)
- Succeeded by: Omar Côté (Union Nationale Party)
- Constituency: Montréal–Saint-Jacques

Personal details
- Born: May 25, 1913 Montreal, Quebec, Canada
- Died: March 3, 1975 (aged 61) Ottawa, Ontario, Canada
- Party: Quebec Liberal Party/New Democratic Party
- Spouse: Lilly Jodoin (née Cooke)
- Occupation: Trade Unionist/Politician

Claude Jodoin OC (May 25, 1913 – March 1, 1975) was a Canadian trade unionist and politician. He served as the first president of the Canadian Labour Congress from 1956 to 1966.

== Background ==
Born in the Montreal suburb of Westmount, Jodoin was educated at Brebeuf College. In 1937 he became an organizer for the International Ladies Garment Workers Union serving as a Canadian manager of the union from 1947 to 1951.

== Political career ==
From 1940 to 1942 and again from 1947 to 1954 he served as an alderman on Montreal City Council. He was elected in the 23 March 1942 by-election to the National Assembly of Quebec, as a member of the Quebec Liberal Party, representing the Montréal–Saint-Jacques electoral district. He lost his seat in 1944 and was defeated in an attempt to regain a seat in the Legislature as an independent candidate in 1948. He had been leader of the Young Liberals of Canada in 1939. He was offered a seat in the Senate of Canada by Prime Minister Louis St. Laurent in 1956 but turned it down.

Despite his earlier involvement with the Liberal Party, Jodoin supported the decision by the Canadian Labour Congress to work with the Co-operative Commonwealth Federation to found the New Democratic Party in 1961. Speaking in 1960, he said "The Congress, and I as its president, believe that the need for a new party is greater today than it was even a year and a half ago. Speaking to the NDP's founding convention, Jodoin said "A labour movement that is without interest in political matters is a labour movement that is evading one of the most fundamental responsibilities."

== Union activism ==
From 1944, Jodoin served as the first chair of the Trade and Labour Council of Canada's National Standing Committee on Racial Discrimination.

Jodoin had served as president of the Montreal Trades and Labour Council and became president of the Trades and Labour Congress of Canada in 1954. He led the TLC in unity talks with the Canadian Congress of Labour that lead to their merger, creating the Canadian Labour Congress (CLC). In 1956, the year the CLC formally came into existence, he became its founding president. He won election five times as the Labour Congress' president, the last in 1966. In May 1967, he suffered a debilitating stroke, that forced him to step-down from day-to-day duties as the president. He would never recover from the stroke, and spent the rest of his years in an Ottawa hospital. Despite his disability, and as a sign of respect, he remained as president, though in title only, until his term was over. Donald MacDonald became the acting president until he was elected to the position at the CLC's 1968 convention.

== Honours ==
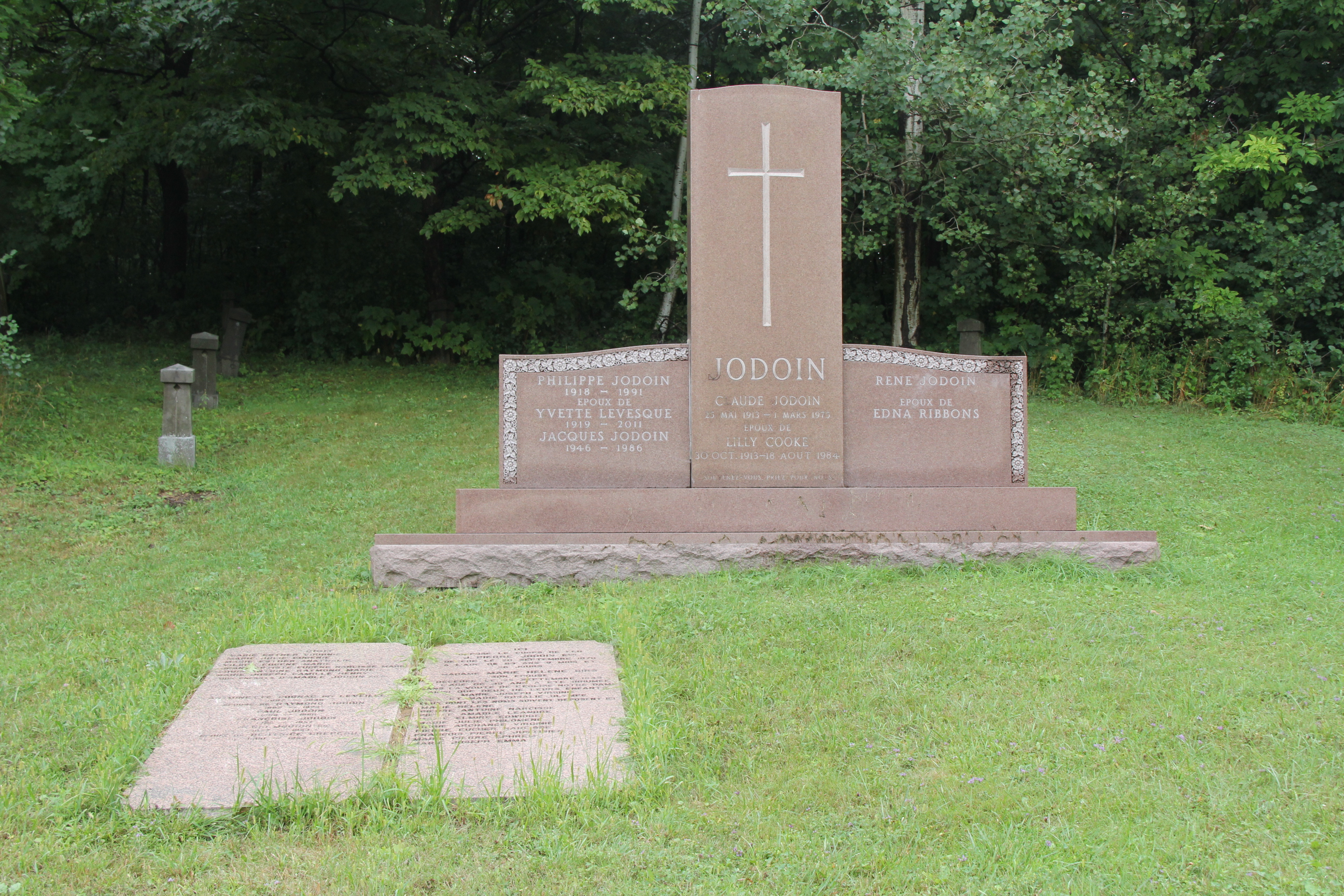
Jodoin's tombstone in Notre Dame des Neiges Cemetery.

Near the end of his life, Jodoin received many awards in recognition for his union and political work. Most of the major honours came in 1967, when he was appointed to the Order of Canada in its inaugural year, and the Centennial Medal that marked Canada's 100th birthday. That same year, he received an honorary doctorate of law from the University of New Brunswick. In 1972, he was named to the Labor Hall of Honor. On 1 March 1975, Jodoin finally succumbed to the medical complications brought on by his stroke. He was buried in Montreal three days later in Notre-Dame-des-Neiges cemetery.

National Assembly of Quebec
Preceded by Joseph-Roméo Toupin	Member of the National Assembly for Montréal–Saint-Jacques; 1942–1944	Succeeded by Omer Côté
Trade union offices
New office	President of the Canadian Labour Congress; 1956–1968	Succeeded by Donald MacDonald
