= Stand! (film) =

- Directed by: Robert Adetuyi
- Written by: Danny Schur; Rick Chafe
- Based on: Strike! by Danny Schur
- Produced by: Danny Schur; Jeff Peeler
- Starring: Marshall Williams; Laura Slade Wiggins; Lisa Bell; Gregg Henry; Hayley Sales
- Cinematography: Roy H. Wagner
- Edited by: Ron Wiseman
- Music by: Danny Schur
- Production companies: Boomtalk Musical Production; Frantic Films
- Release date: November 29, 2019
- Running time: 110 minutes
- Country: Canada
- Language: English
- Budget: CA$7 million

Stand! is a 2019 Canadian musical film set during the 1919 Winnipeg general strike that occurred in Winnipeg, Manitoba, Canada. Directed by Robert Adetuyi and written by Danny Schur and Rick Chafe, it is based on the 2005 stage musical Strike! by Schur. The film stars Marshall Williams, Laura Slade Wiggins, Lisa Bell, and Gregg Henry.

== Premise ==
An immigrant Romeo and Juliet in 1919 battle for love and a better future during a time of social upheaval.

== Cast ==
- Marshall Williams - Stefan Sokolowski
- Laura Slade Wiggins - Rebecca Almazoff
- Lisa Bell - Emma Jones
- Gregg Henry - Mike Sokolowski
- Hayley Sales - Helen Armstrong
- Paul Essiembre - A.J. Anderson
- Tristan Carlucci - Moishe Almazoff
- Gabriel Daniels - Gabriel
- Ryan Ash - Davey
- Blake Taylor - Senator Robertson
- Robin Ruel - Susan Robertson
- Boris Gulyarin - Aleksei

== Production ==
In 2005, Danny Schur produced the stage musical Strike! set during the events of the Winnipeg General Strike. Approaching the 100th anniversary of the strike, a movie version was developed by Schur and Rick Chafe. It was originally intended to be shot in 2016, with Samantha Barks attached to play Rebecca Almazoff and Joseph Novak to direct. Both had to be replaced as the production was delayed. The final production was filmed entirely in Winnipeg in August and September 2018. Most of the cast were local Winnipeg actors, including Marshall Williams, who had previously starred on the Glee television series.

== Release ==
The movie was premiered at the Royal Cinema in Toronto on September 9, 2019, during the 2019 Toronto International Film Festival, although not as an in-festival film. The movie was released in selected theatres across Canada on November 29, 2019.

== Reception ==
Critic Randall King of the Winnipeg Free Press rated it three out of five stars, saying the musical play "hit incisive notes" but had been turned into "a conventional, contemporary Hollywood movie, geared not to the cineaste but to the wide-open movie marketplace." He was disappointed that Adetuyi, who had previously worked on dance-centric films, had "eschewed choreography." The Globe and Mail described Stand! as a "spirited new Canadian movie musical" that features "a well-crafted score plus Broadway-worthy tunes that stick in your head." Reviewer Neil Weisensel singled out the performances by Gregg Henry, Marshall Williams, Laura Slade Wiggins, Hayley Sales, Lisa Bell, and Paul Essiembre. Noting the parallels between the world of 1919 and the present, he wrote that "it's heartening to see a film that is actually about something, made by people who are expert storytellers." He gave the film three and a half out of four stars.
