= Pat Sullivan (trade unionist) =

John Allan "Pat" Sullivan (born 19 June 1893) was an Irish-born Canadian trade unionist.

Born in Carrick-on-Shannon, Sullivan emigrated to Canada in 1926, with his family. In Canada, he found work as a cook on a ship on the Great Lakes. He joined the union of seamen, which collaborated with the shipping companies. Disappointed by the union's approach, in 1935, Sullivan founded a rival union, the National Seamen's Union, which by 1938 was known as the Canadian Seaman's Union (CSU), and had about 5,000 members. That year, he led the union in a successful strike.

After initially affiliated his union to the All-Canadian Congress of Labour, in 1938, Sullivan moved it to the more international Trades and Labor Congress of Canada (TLC). He had joined the Communist Party of Canada in 1936, and when he was elected as a vice president of the TLC, he was the first communist to hold such a post, something which prompted the resignation of TLC secretary-treasurer Arthur D'Aoust. Sullivan later rose to become secretary-treasurer himself.

In 1940, Sullivan was interned, officially due to sabotage of the war effort. His trial took place in 1941, and largely focused on his trade union activities, rather than his political affiliation. He was released the following year, but had to report regularly to the police until the end of World War II.

In 1945, he attended the World Trade Union Conference in London alongside many renowned trade unionists.

In 1947, Sullivan left the Communist Party, denouncing its influence in the union movement. He also resigned from the TLC, and from the Canadian Seamen's Union, founding a rival Canadian Lake Seamen's Union, which in 1949 merged into the Seafarer's International Union. The CSU claimed that he had been in secret talks with shipowners, and that Sullivan had resigned when given an ultimatum by other unions leaders, to stop this activity. In 1955, Sullivan published a memoir, Red Sails on the Great Lakes.

Trade union offices
Preceded by Union founded	President of the Canadian Seamen's Union; 1935–1947	Succeeded by Harry Davis
Preceded by Arthur D'Aoust	Secretary-Treasurer of the Trades and Labor Congress of Canada; 1943–1947	Succeeded by John W. Buckley
