= William Arthur Pritchard =

William Arthur (Bill) Pritchard
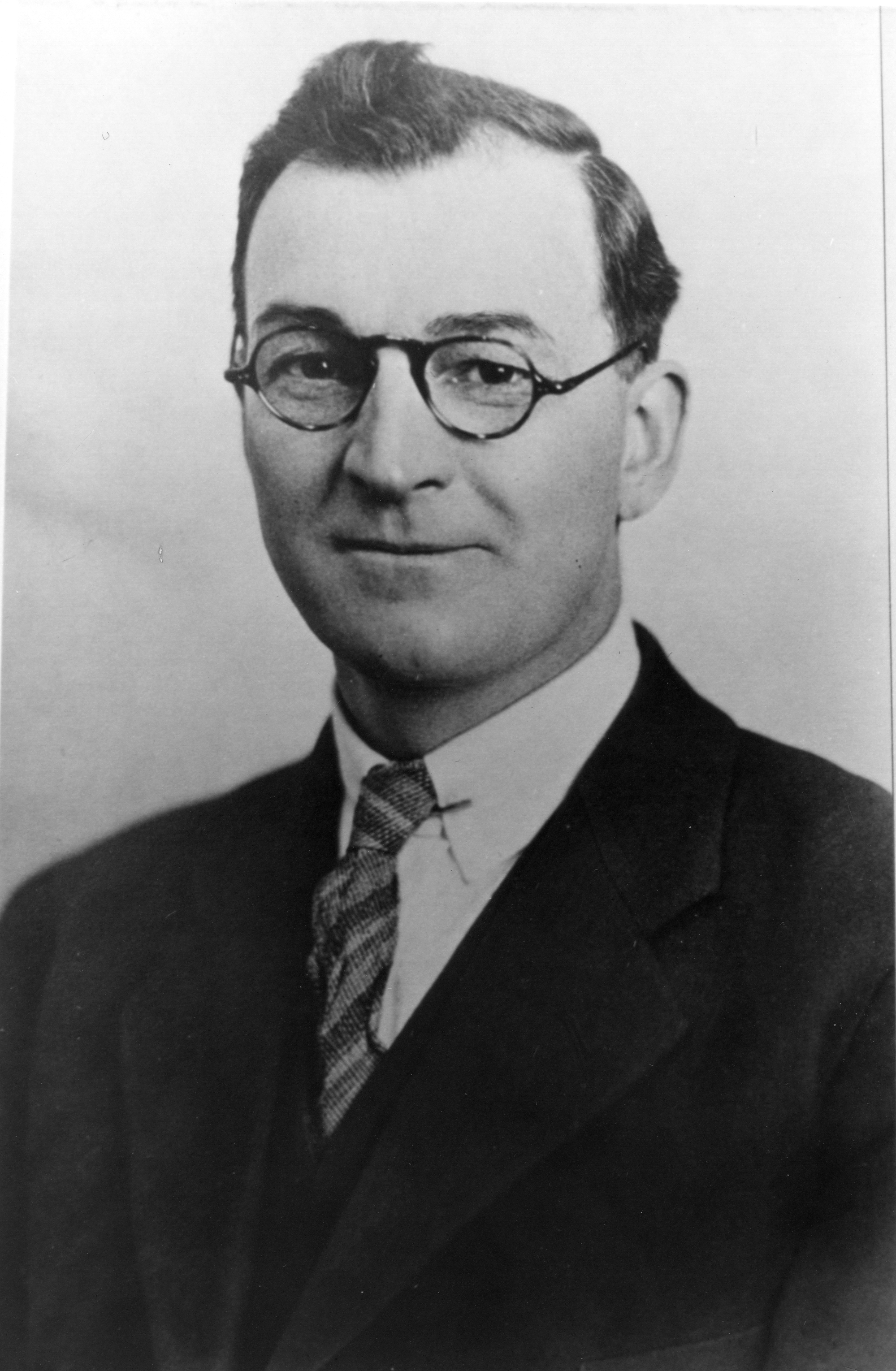
- Pritchard in 1932
- Born: April 3, 1888; Salford, England
- Died: October 23, 1981 (aged 93); Los Angeles, California
- Occupations: Labour activist, organizer, editor, journalist, politician
- Other political affiliations: Socialist Party of Canada (1905-1925); CCF (1933-1938)

William Arthur (Bill) Pritchard (April 3, 1888 – October 23, 1981) was a Canadian Marxist labour activist, organizer, editor, journalist, and politician. A major figure in the One Big Union movement, he also was one of the defendants in the 1920 sedition trial of leaders of the 1919 Winnipeg General Strike. Pritchard later was elected reeve (mayor) of Burnaby, British Columbia during the Great Depression and played an instrumental role in founding the BC Co-operative Commonwealth Federation.

== Biography ==
=== Early years ===
Born in Salford, England, Pritchard attended school in Swinton. His Welsh-born father, James Pritchard, emigrated to British Columbia in 1900 when Bill was 12 years old. While working as a miner on Vancouver Island, James Pritchard became a socialist activist. In 1902, he left the reformist Socialist Party of British Columbia to help found the short-lived Revolutionary Socialist Party of Canada before joining the broader movement again as a founding member of the Socialist Party of Canada (SPC) in January 1905.

Meanwhile in England the Pritchard family's financial situation remained precarious. Bill Pritchard's schooling came to an end shortly before his 13th birthday when he was apprenticed to a Lancashire building contractor so that he might help support his family while learning the construction trades. Pritchard attended night school over the next seven years at two technical institutes where he gained formal training including typing, shorthand, and some German.

In 1911 Pritchard's father returned home from Canada for a short visit. The 23-year-old decided to join his father on the return trip, sailing with him across the ocean before traversing the breadth of Canada by rail to the Pacific coast. The pair arrived in Vancouver on May 19, 1911, and immediately went to meet with party leader E. T. Kingsley at the office of Western Clarion, the SPC's weekly newspaper. Two days later Bill Pritchard attended his first socialist meeting and before the month was out, he was admitted as a card-carrying member of the SPC. In 1913 he and fellow SPC activist Eleanor (Hanson) married.

=== World War I and its aftermath ===
Over the next decade, Pritchard became a central figure in the early twentieth-century Canadian socialist movement. D.C. Masters, in his book on the Winnipeg General Strike, wrote:

Pritchard was distinctly a man of parts: a fine athlete, a musician of ability who organized juvenile orchestras and male voice choirs, an omnivorous reader who, at the age of eleven, had read Josephus and Gibbon. A Marxian socialist, he was a brilliant thinker and his native Welsh fire made him a most eloquent speaker.

From 1914-17, Pritchard edited Western Clarion and contributed articles from 1911-19. He was active in the British Columbia labour movement and travelled as an SPC speaker and organizer. All of this played out against a backdrop of mounting labour unrest and increasingly heavy-handed state repression.

He was the SPC candidate in Comox in the 1916 provincial election but was unsuccessful. He was the SPC candidate in Vancouver Centre in the 1917 federal election but was unsuccessful.

In 1919 Pritchard spoke at the Western Labour Conference that led to the founding of the One Big Union movement. The convention also delegated Pritchard to report on the Winnipeg confrontation that was then underway.

Although Pritchard did not stay in the city long, he nonetheless was targeted by state authorities and, with six other strike leaders, was put on trial and convicted on trumped-up charges of seditious conspiracy in 1920. His address to the jury, which he delivered without notes over two days, is considered a landmark in Canadian socialist and labour history. While he was serving his one-year sentence at Stony Mountain Federal Penitentiary, Eleanor Pritchard, his SPC activist wife, ran as a candidate in the 1920 Manitoba election.

=== Later political career ===
Pritchard's later career in electoral politics began after the SPC dissolved in 1925.

In 1926, he ran as an Independent Labour candidate in the federal constituency of New Westminster, promising workers and farmers a war on poverty in contrast to the personal partisanship of Arthur Meighen and Mackenzie King. He was defeated, but did win certain polls—such as the railway worker community of Port Mann.

A concentration of labour voters in North Burnaby, where Pritchard had settled in 1922, was identified and effectively used by him in his subsequent campaigns for municipal office. Elected to Burnaby council in 1928, he gained the confidence of North Ward voters by advocating planned community development. He then gambled, successfully, on a bid for reeve, just as the Depression arrived in the winter of 1929–30.

==== Reeve of Burnaby, 1930-32 ====
Pritchard soon emerged as a champion of local relief issues vis-à-vis senior governments, and was rewarded by a landslide majority (66 per cent) in his last municipal race (January 1932). On his watch, Burnaby gained unprecedented profile as a laboratory, real or imagined, of socialist innovation.

In the face of the economic hardship, Pritchard took a number of steps as reeve to ameliorate the plight of both the unemployed and homeowners who had lost their homes because they could not pay their taxes. He also took steps to encourage local self-sufficiency, notably by supporting the Army of the Common Good, a self-help organization that was a harbinger of the credit union movement in British Columbia.

Finally, in the autumn of 1932, the Burnaby council, after lengthy debate, symbolically repudiated its municipal debt (through defaulting on a $25 bond payment) to protest the inaction of the provincial and federal governments. The insolvency triggered the province's intervention, which replaced the council with an appointed commissioner who ran the municipality's affairs for the next decade.

While reeve, Pritchard also held executive positions in municipal bodies at the provincial and national levels, and made efforts to resolve the 1931 Barnet Millworkers' strike.

==== Provincial politics ====
Pritchard was deeply involved with the Reconstruction Party (a branch of the League for Social Reconstruction) as well as the formation of the Co-operative Commonwealth Federation in British Columbia. He was a CCF candidate in the 1933 BC election. He founded the CCF party newspaper, The Commonwealth, and was its editor from 1933 to 1936.

However, in 1936 he became embroiled in the conflict between Robert Connell, a Christian social democrat, and Ernest Winch, a Marxist, over the future direction of the CCF and its relationship with the Communist Party. Pritchard, whose socialism had become gradualist rather than revolutionary, took Connell's side in the affair. He joined an exodus to form the British Columbia Social Constructive Party, which fielded candidates in the 1937 provincial election. Pritchard and John Price ran for the Constructive Party in the two-seat Vancouver East district. None of the Constructive candidates were elected.

After the death of his daughter Eleanor in 1938 (an apparent suicide), Pritchard moved to Los Angeles, California.

He was active in the World Socialist Party of the United States. In the early 1970s, he wrote more than 45 papers (a number of them co-authored with Bill Miller) that analyzed world politics and capitalism from a Marxist perspective. He also published the pamphlet, Socialism: A Simple Exposition.

In 1975, he received a civic award from the City of Burnaby.

Bill Pritchard died on October 23, 1981.
