= All Canadian =

All Canadian may refer to:

- All-Canadian Congress of Labour, Canadian national labour confederation
- Cwench All Canadian Games, a pair of annual all-star basketball games featuring the top senior Canadian high school girls & boys respectively
- U Sports Football All-Canadian Team, best Canadian football players in U Sports at Canadian universities
