= One Big Union (Canada) =

Trade union

- National Industrial Union of the Dominion of Canada
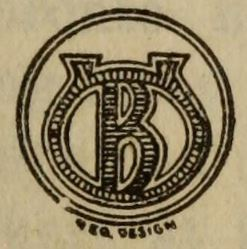
- Federation merger: Canadian Labour Congress
- Founded: March 13, 1919
- Dissolved: 1956
- Headquarters: Winnipeg
- Location: Canada
- Members: 70,000 (1919)
- Key people: Robert B. Russell; Roger Ernest Bray
- Affiliations: Socialist Party of Canada

The One Big Union (OBU) was a left-wing industrial union based primarily in Western Canada. It was launched formally in Calgary on June 4, 1919, as a replacement for the then-outlawed Industrial Workers of the World, to carry on the drive toward revolutionary industrial unionism. Initially the OBU experienced a spectacular upsurge, then lost most of its members within a few years. It finally merged with the Canadian Labour Congress in 1956.

== Background ==
Towards the end of World War I, labour activism in Western Canada became more radical. Western Canadian radicals protested the management of the Trades and Labour Congress of Canada (TLC), the American Federation of Labor (AFL) and the governments in power. Western unions were represented by only 45 of 400 delegates at the September 1918 TLC convention. The other delegates easily defeated the western delegates' resolutions to condemn Canada's efforts for World War I. And they elected conservative Tom Moore to replace long-serving socialist TLC president James Watters.

The federal state clamped down on radical publications and organizations, outlawing 14 organizations including the Industrial Workers of the World (IWW). But labour activists and socialists, especially in western Canada, were determined not to allow the vision of a new society to die and established a new organization that carried as its credo the old IWW motto, "Workers of the World, Unite!."

Western TLC unionists met annually in what became known as the Western Labor Conferences. The 1919 event was held in Calgary on March 13, prior to the annual national TLC congress. The 1919 WLC conference was dominated by members of the Socialist Party of Canada, who favored secession from the TLC. The majority at the conference voted to form a new "revolutionary industrial union" separate from the AFL/TLC, to be initiated officially at a convention scheduled for June 11. The conference also approved resolutions condemning the Canadian government's practices during the war and expressing solidarity with Bolsheviks in Russia and the Spartacist League in Germany. It was also decided to poll Canadian workers on a general strike.

== Rise ==
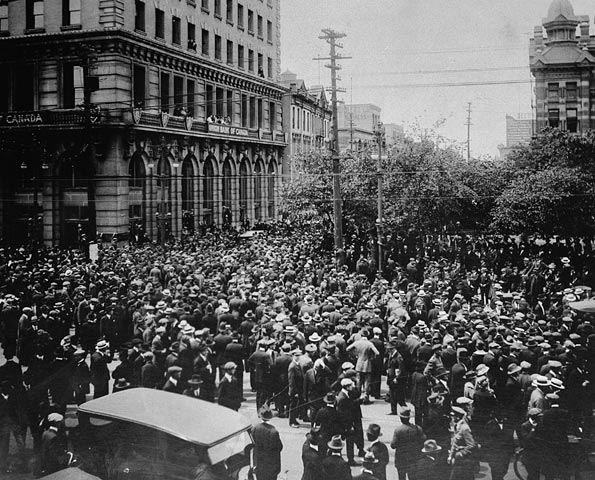
Crowd gathered outside old City Hall during the Winnipeg General Strike, June 21, 1919

While its statements underlined the need for revolutionary direct action, its record was one of practical pursuit of incremental advances and participation in jobsite actions, sometimes led by others. And at that it was effective.

The general strike that began in Winnipeg on May 15 was in large part inspired by the One Big Union's ideals. A number of OBU leaders, including Robert B. Russell, were arrested in conjunction with the strike; Russell was sentenced to two years' imprisonment. Edmonton, Calgary, Drumheller and Vancouver began their own general strikes, spurred on by Winnipeg. Many of the leaders of these strikes, such as Edmonton's Joe Knight, Calgary's Mrs. Jean MacWilliams, and Amherst's Frank Burke, were OBU activists. A.S Wells, leader of the BC Federation of Labour at the time, was a founding member of the OBU. Becky Buhay was a leading member as well.

The AFL and the TLC resisted the secession, by what would soon become the OBU. OBU members and OBU unions were expelled from most local trades councils. Nonetheless, thousands of workers resigned the AFL and the TLC and joined the OBU. These included loggers, hard rock miners, coal miners, longshoremen, construction workers, metalworkers, shop craft workers, etc. The One Big Union organized by industry rather than by trade, in response to a de-emphasis of craftsmanship (Taylorism) and the burgeoning demand for unskilled labour. The OBU's anti-capitalist policy was evident by its constitution's pre-amble:

The O.B.U. ... seeks to organize the wage worker not according to craft but according to industry; according to class and class needs; and calls upon all workers irrespective of nationality, sex, or craft to organize into a workers' organization, so that they may be enabled to more successfully carry on the every day fight over wages, hours of work, etc. and prepare themselves for the day when production for profit shall be replaced by production of use.

It recognized its prospective membership as "all those who by useful work of hand or brain, feed, clothe, or shelter; or contribute towards the health, comfort and education of the human race."

By late 1919 the OBU's membership was 70,000, mostly in western Canada. In Edmonton, unionized carpenters, United Mine Workers, and members of the International Association of Machinists joined the OBU, although this decision caused their expulsion from the local trades council. In Winnipeg a vote taken by the Trades and Labor Council went 8841 to 705 in favor of the OBU.

The OBU had a significant presence in Nova Scotia, organizing coal workers during the Cape Breton Labour War, and received support from nearly all of Amherst's workers.

In 1920 Angus McDonald, a carpenter and proponent of revolutionary industrial unionism, was elected in Temiskaming (northern Ontario) as an Independent. He was a supporter of the One Big Union. He was re-elected in 1921. The riding was abolished prior to the 1925 election.

Although devoted to revolutionary industrial unionism, its activists did participate in elections. R.B. Russell and Vancouver's W.A. Pritchard ran in the 1921 federal election. P.M. Christophers was elected in Alberta largely by OBU coalminers. One Big Union supporters Hannah Gale and A.G. Broatch were elected in Calgary over traditional trade union candidates John Rae and Walter Smitten. (Calgary used proportional representation in its elections so voters had clear choices.)

== Fall ==
The union's maximum was attained during late 1919 or early 1920. Due to persecution by employers, the media, government and even other unions, membership decreased. Employers refused to bargain with the OBU's representatives, and OBU organizers were beaten, kidnapped and dismissed from coalfields.

District 18 (Alberta) of the United Mine Workers were forced by federal law out of the OBU. A court case to prevent the Canadian National Railway discriminating against OBU activists (Young vs. CNR) was quashed by the Privy Council in 1927.

By 1921, the OBU had only approximately 5,000 members and by 1927 only 1,600, almost all in Winnipeg. By 1922, most of the union's income came from a lottery that ran in the weekly OBU bulletin. At the time lotteries were illegal in Canada, but it took the authorities years to prosecute OBU for its lottery. The bulletin had a large circulation because of the lottery; even businessmen bought it for the lottery coupons.

Within a few years many OBU adherents switched to the Communist Party or, like J.B. MacLachlan, went to the Workers Unity League.

During the late 1920s the OBU briefly joined the All-Canadian Congress of Labour, made up of industrial unions. It considered joining the Canadian Congress of Labour during World War II, but by then nearly all of its members were employees of the Winnipeg Transit System. In 1956, the One Big Union, consisting of 24,000 members, merged with the Canadian Labour Congress.

== See also ==
Timeline of labor issues and events in Canada
