= Strike! =

Strike! may refer to:

- Strike! (comic book), a comic book series published 1987-1988.
- Strike! (1998 film)
- Strike! (musical), a 2005 musical play
- Strike! (album), a 2009 album by The Baseballs
