= Royal Commission on Industrial Relations =

- Also known as: Mathers Commission
- Commissioners: Thomas Graham Mathers (Chair); Robert Smeaton White; Charles Robert Harrison; Frank Pauzé; Tom Moore; J.W. Bruce; Carl Riordon
- Inquiry period: 22 March 1919 – 29 June 1919
- Authorized: Order in Council P.C. 670

The Royal Commission on Industrial Relations of 1919, otherwise known as the Mathers Commission, was chaired by Thomas Graham Mathers and examined Canada's industrial relations. The Commission was originally titled Commission to Inquire Into and Report Upon Industrial Relations in Canada. The Commission released its findings in July 1919, after the Commissioners visited 28 cities from 26 April to 16 June, hearing from 486 witnesses from British Columbia in the West to Nova Scotia in the East. In order to collect evidence the Commission advertised their arrival in the newspapers of the 28 industrial centres visited. The witnesses included representatives of employees and employers. Many groups prepared statements in advance for their respected collective views.

Although the Commission is considered to be a legislative failure, it nevertheless remains valuable for its account of the rise of militancy in the Canadian labour movement following the First World War.
