= Women's Labour League (Canada) =

Members of the Winnipeg WLL preparing bundles to support Nova Scotia miners in c. 1925

Women's Labour Leagues (WLL) were loosely-affiliated organizations which began appearing across Canada shortly prior to World War I, inspired by the British Women's Labour League. The leagues supported women in the workforce, and, more generally, the labour movement.

The best known WLL was probably Helen Armstrong's Winnipeg organization, which supported labour actions by women workers during World War I and was highly visible during the Winnipeg General Strike of 1919. Other prominent WLLs included those in Cape Breton which, in the 1920s, energetically supported striking miners and their families.

In 1924, Florence Custance and the Communist Party of Canada (CPC) established the Federation of Women's Labour Leagues, and under her leadership the number of leagues had grown to 37 by 1927. The federation's bid to affiliate with the Trades and Labor Congress was rejected, ostensibly because "a separate organization of women would ultimately weaken the working class movement", but more likely because of its association with the CPC.

In 1930, many of the WLLs merged into the CPC's Workers Unity League, but a handful of WLLs persisted into the 1940s.
