= Canadian Seamen's Union =

Trade union

The Canadian Seaman's Union was a trade union in Canada which organized among sailors. Affiliated with the Trades and Labor Congress of Canada, it was established in 1936 and gained prominence during World War II. After the war, it was red-baited and crushed by opposition from the Canadian government, shipping companies, and the Seafarers' International Union.

== Presidents ==
1935: Pat Sullivan
1947: Harry Davis
