= Canadian Labour Revolt =

1918–1925 labour conflict

- Part of the aftermath of World War I and the Revolutions of 1917–1923
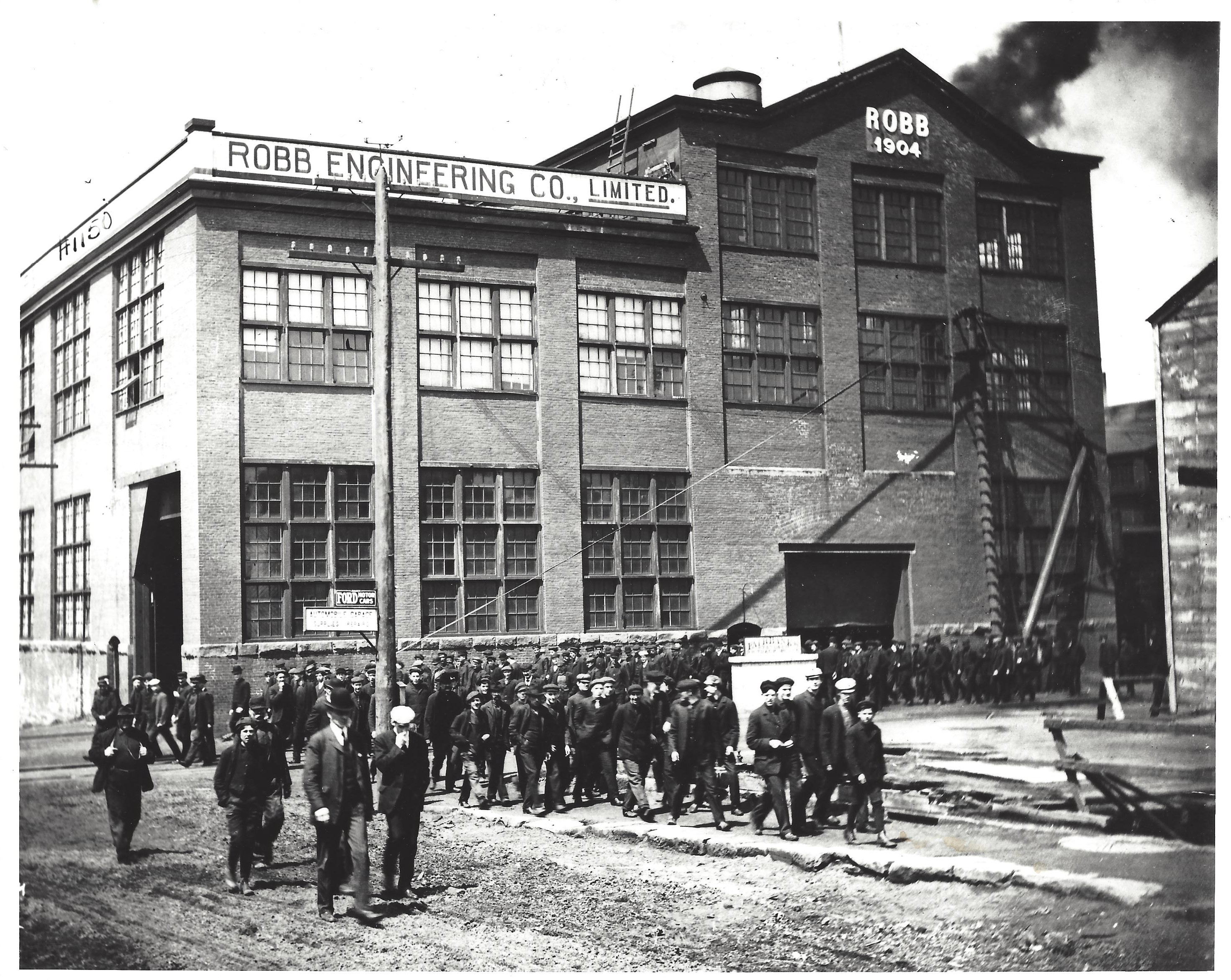
- Machine shop workers walk out during the Amherst general strike
- Date: 2 August 1918 – 11 June 1925 (6 years, 313 days)
- Location: Canada
- Result: Canadian government victory

Parties
Various local unions; One Big Union (from 1919); Communist Party (from 1921)	Dominion of Canada; Royal Canadian Mounted Police

Lead figures
Robert B. Russell; Roger Ernest Bray; Frank Burkeb; J. B. McLachlan; A. E. Smith	Robert Borden; Arthur Meighen

The Canadian Labour Revolt was a loosely connected series of strikes, riots, and labour conflicts that took place across Canada between 1918 and 1925, largely organized by the One Big Union (OBU).

It was caused by a variety of factors including rising costs of living, unemployment, intensity of work, the unwillingness of employers to recognize unions, and the ongoing international revolution. The One Big Union aimed to overthrow capitalism and the Canadian state and replace it with a socialist system based on worker control of industry and a democratic system with representation based on workplace instead of residential location.

Inspired by the Bolshevik Revolution in Russia and the Spartacist uprising in Germany, labour unions in Canada grew increasingly militant. The revolt commenced with the Vancouver general strike on 2 August 1918. The general strike was violently suppressed by the military, and union offices were ransacked. Victor Midgley, the leader of the strike, was thrown out of a window, and forced to kiss the British flag. The suppression of the strike enraged the labour movement, with many labour leaders and union locals calling for revolution against the Canadian government. At the September 1918 national conference of the Trades and Labor Congress of Canada (TLC), the umbrella organization to which Canadian unions belonged, A. S. Wells, leader of the BC Federation of Labour said "we will have to have our industrial organization similar to that which has proven of such benefit in Russia." The growing radicalism was denounced by the TLC.

In March 1919, radical unions left the TLC and formed the One Big Union. The OBU organized over 100 general strikes by 1925, the most prominent being the Winnipeg general strike. Italian revolutionary Antonio Gramsci proclaimed that in Canada, "Industrial strikes have taken on the overt character of a bid to install a Soviet regime". The Labour Revolt ended in 1925 with the defeat of the steel and mine workers at the Battle of Waterford Lake on June 11, 1925.

== Background ==
In the aftermath of WWI, Canada suffered from severe inflation. The cost of living increased by 48% between 1916 and 1918, increasing to 128% by 1920. Rent, fuel, and food all saw their prices increase significantly. Many who had been working in war time industries such as munitions became unemployed. Additionally, industries such as clothing and metalworking began implementing technology to streamline jobs. This made work more repetitive, intensive and rendered skills like craftsmanship redundant. A report conducted by the federal government found industrial workers suffered from poor working conditions, increasing working hours, and low wages. Child labour still persisted, and the condition of female workers was significantly worse than their male counterparts.

The Russian Revolution contributed to the increasing unrest within the Canadian working class, inflaming tensions between them and their employers. Organizations such as the Socialist Party of Canada and the Industrial Workers of the World saw significant increases of popularity, attracting many to the ideas of syndicalism, socialism, and communism.

Within the Canadian labour movement, there were increasing divisions regarding the purpose of labour unions. The socialist or 'radical' faction believed that overthrowing capitalism and establishing workers' control industry with production for use should be the ultimate goal. This lead the socialists to favour industrial unionism, which organized all workers into the same union regardless of occupation, craft, or skill level. The radical faction was also supportive of the Bolshevik Revolution, which alienated them from the Canadian government and sections of the middle class who were otherwise sympathetic of the labour movement. The moderate faction, which made up a majority of the Trades and Labour Congress leadership argued that the purpose of unionism should be to negotiate only for material gains such as working hours and wages. The moderates favoured craft unionism, which organized workers based on their trade. The moderate faction was significantly influenced by Samual Gompers and the American Federation of Labour, to which the TLC was affiliated. The ongoing allied intervention against the Bolshevik Revolution further embellished this divide. The radical faction demanded the 6000 Canadian soldiers deployed to fight the Russian communists be recalled, where as the moderates were silent on the issue.

== 1918 strike movement ==
=== Calgary ===
Between 1916 and 1918, Calgary, Alberta's union density increased by 35%, making it the 8th most unionized city in the country. Industrial unionism over took craft unionism in the city, with the Building Trades Council, the Carpenters District Council, and the CPR Federated Trades Council becoming some of the largest of the city's 44 unions. Within the Calgary Trades and Labor Council (ETLC), socialists began to amass significant power. Socialist Andrew Broatch became leader of the machinist local, and was elected to the city council. In 1917, R.L Tallon was elected leader of the Railway Employees Department's 4th Division, representing over 50,000 workers across Alberta. Alex Ross won a seat to Alberta's legislative assembly.

In September 1918, R.L Tallon's Railway Employee's union failed to reach a collective bargaining agreement with Canadian Pacific Railway. Against the directive of the Trades and Labour Congress of Canada, the Railway workers went on strike on 5 October 1918. The newly created strike committee called on 21 union locals to join in on the strike, of which 19 voted to participate. Machinists, pipe-fitters, blacksmiths, boilermakers, carmen, and electricians downed tools and walked out on their jobs. On 19 October, workers returned streetcars to the depots, crippling public transit.

The strike enjoyed wide support among WWI veterans. Private George Palmer addressed a mass meeting of the Calgary Great War Veterans’ Association on 2 November 1918:

“Are we going to permit a few greed-sodden drones, men who know not nor ever did know the meaning of the words patriotism and sacrifice to have the ruling of our lives? No! A thousand times no! It’s the rotten corrupt system that allows men to accumulate millions while others starve.”

The strike was ultimately successful, with the railway workers receiving the concessions they demanded.

=== Edmonton ===
The militancy of the Edmonton labour movement grew significantly in 1918. On 19 January 1918, Edmonton city council appointed a fire chief who was outside the Firefighter's union and hostile to its existence. This led to firefighters holding a strike vote on 1 February and then going on strike. With the solidarity of the firemen and wide support among Edmonton citizens, the ETLC and other city unions, a vote was held among unionists about conducting a general strike in defence of the firemen's demands. A plebiscite was held on March 4, 1918 to allow the voters to weigh in, and a majority voted to back the firefighters. With the support of Labour Party aldermen on the Edmonton city council, the strike ended with success on 6 March.

In October 1918, the Edmonton Trades and Labour Council voted for a general sympathy strike with striking postal workers and the ongoing railway strike. Edmonton Grand Trunk Railway machinist E.J. Thompson stated:

"We're the producers and we ain't getting what we produce."

The threat of a sympathy strike was enough for the postal workers' strike to end in victory, and contributed to the success of the railway strike.

== 1919 Radicals split the Trades and Labour Congress of Canada, form OBU ==
On March 13, 1919, the Western Labour Conference was held in Calgary. In this meeting of delegates from Canada's five western-most provinces, unions belonging to the radical faction of the labour movement split from the Trades and Labour Congress of Canada, forming the One Big Union.

Alberta sent the largest number of delegates at 89, British Columbia sent the second at 85, Manitoba sent 46, Saskatchewan sent 17, and Ontario sent two. This made up a majority of labour unions in all cases except for Ontario. Unions from western Canada were significantly more radical than those in the East, and believed the Eastern unions were impeding the progress of the labour movement. The Western Labour Conference voted on and passed numerous resolutions that had been voted down at the national conference of the Trades and Labour Congress in Quebec during September of the previous year. The unions attending the conference voted to leave the TLC and form the One Big Union. The resolutions passed by the conference became the One Big Union's programme. The One Big Union was explicitly socialist and influenced by Marxist ideas. Some of its beliefs and aspirations were echoes of the then-outlawed Industrial Workers of the World.

The One Big Union's programme called for:

- A 6-hour work day and four day work week with no loss in pay
- All Canadian workers to be organized within the same union
- A "Dictatorship of the Proletariat", a form of government where the working class has complete power. Representation would be based on workplace instead of on electoral district or riding.
- Workers' control of industry through the labour unions.
- Nationalization of the all enterprises.
- The withdrawal of all Canadian troops in Russia and solidarity with the Bolshevik Revolution and other communist uprisings.
- The release of all political prisoners.
- Elimination of the free market and the establishment of a planned economy with production for use instead of production for profit.
- Advancement of all demands through general strikes.

The One Big Union was immediately denounced by most media outlets and the remaining unions within the TLC for trying to start a Bolshevik Revolution in Canada.

== 1919 One Big Union risings ==
Strikes: May, June, and July 1919
Province	Number of strikes	Number of workers involved	Duration in striker days
Nova Scotia	11	3,461	85,135
New Brunswick	6	128	631
Quebec	57	25,988	395,285
Ontario	90	34,544	632,409
Manitoba	6	21,756	817,686
Saskatchewan	9	2,041	31,833
Alberta	9	9,271	304,967
British Columbia	23	17,234	305,360
Total	210	114,423	2,573,306

=== Vancouver General Strike ===
Said to be the longest-lasting of the strikes held in sympathy with the Winnipeg general strike.

=== Amherst general strike ===
On May 19, less than a week into the Winnipeg strike, workers organized in the Amherst branch of the One Big Union closed down the city for a general strike. The One Big Union covered nearly all of Amherst's workers, including engineers, autoworkers, mechanics, railway car builders, cotton mill workers, and shoe manufactures. The leader of the Amherst OBU, Frank Burke, allowed any worker to join the union regardless of their workplaces union status, and he replaced dues with a one time one dollar fee upon entry.

Within one day of the strike, Robb Engineering negotiated with striking workers, agreeing to wage increases and limited worker self management in return for the engineers coming back to work. The remaining workers continued to strike for an additional three weeks before the towns employers agreed to recognize the union, engage in annual collective bargaining, and a nine-hour day with no reduction in pay.

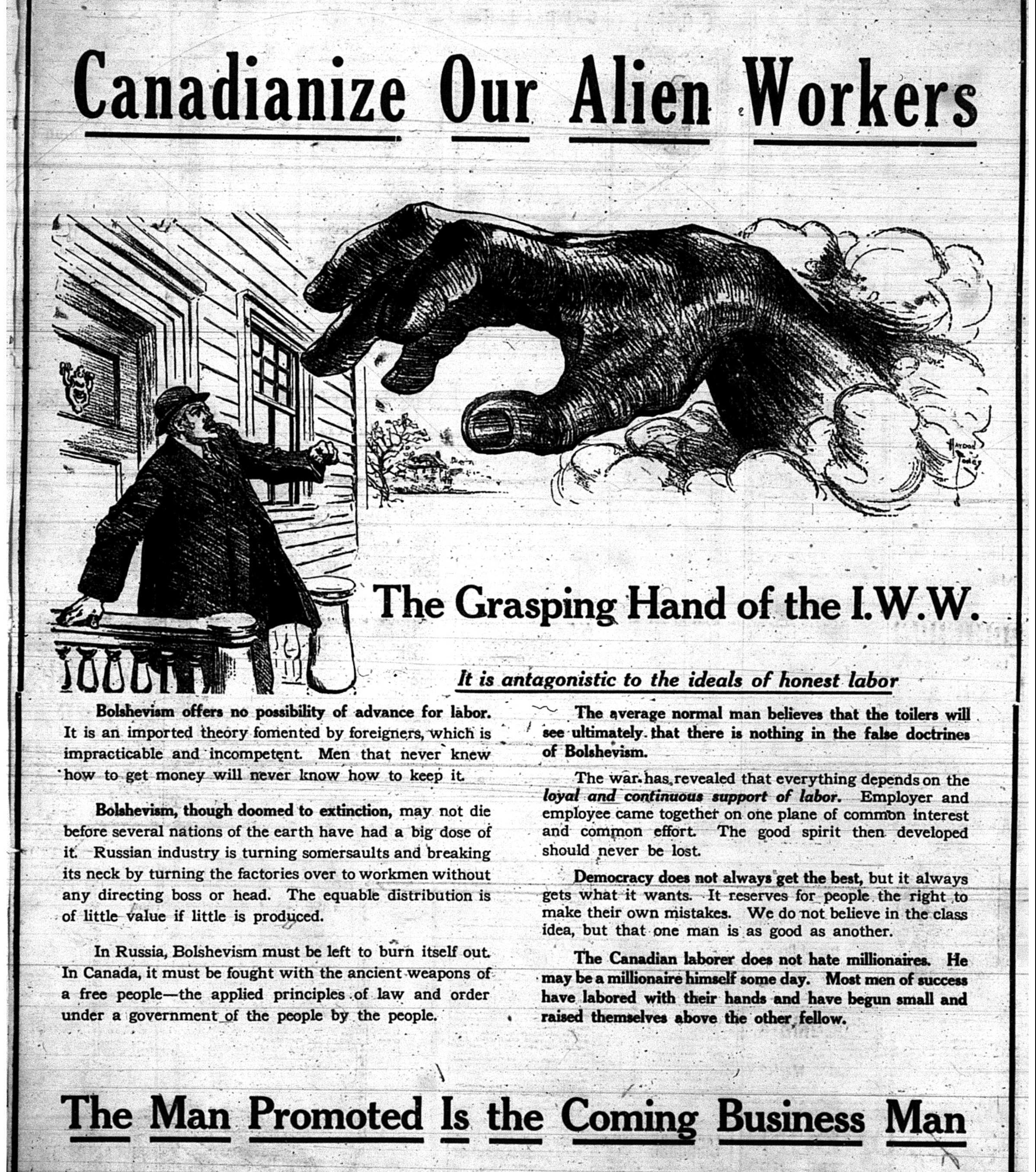
Calgary Herald headline during the general strike

=== Brandon general strike ===
Brandon, Manitoba, voted on 20 May to begin a general strike that costed over 10,000 striker days- one of the highest per-capita rates in the country. The Brandon general strike was the longest and most cohesive general strike in the 1919 wave. The strike began with telephone operators and railway workers walking off the job, but within a week 450 workers, nearly the entire working population of the tiny locality, was on strike. The small town was completely divided; the Brandon Sun, local law enforcement, and the business community on one side, and the Brandon Trades and Labour Council, together with the People's Church led by A. E. Smith on the other. When 350 strikers, including 36 WWI veterans marched through Brandon's streets, the city council called in the Royal Canadian Mounted Police.

After the Winnipeg general strike was suppressed, the Brandon Trades and Labour Council appealed to the rest of the country to continue the general strike, but were unsuccessful. In 1920, Smith was elected to the Manitoba Legislature as a member of the Dominion Labour Party.

=== Calgary general strike ===
On 25 May, Calgary, Alberta workers from 24 unions voted for a general strike. The Calgary general strike is the largest labour dispute in the city's history, costing 31,700 striker days and lasting four weeks. As the strike progressed, more unions voted to participate including bricklayers, masons, and plasterers. Japanese immigrants who had been hired as scabs walked off the job as well. A strike committee was formed for co-ordination. The committee organized marches through the city on multiple occasions, accompanied by striking marching band members who would play The Internationale and other socialist anthems. Dances, lunches, and fundraisers were organized by the committee, raising thousands of dollars in today's money. Women also played a large role in the strike, playing a large role in organizing the strike committee. Housewives as well as female workers participated. Calgary's Mrs. Jean MacWilliams, who had organized laundry workers, asked rhetorically, "Are we in favour of a bloody revolution? Why, any kind of revolution would be better than conditions as they are now!" As in other cities, the Royal Canadian Mounted Police suppressed the strike. Police famously confiscated and destroyed every book bound in red leather, leading to an incident where mounties accidentally burnt dozens bibles.

The strike was called off on June 25, after the events of Bloody Saturday, but not after earning shorter hours and higher wages for mechanists, moulders and other metal workers.

=== Edmonton general strike ===
Edmonton, Alberta began a general strike on 26 May, after a 1,676-506 pro-strike vote. 34 of Edmonton's 38 unions participated, led by Socialist Party militant and carpenters' union leader Joseph Knight and Industrial Workers of the World member Carl Berg. The strike's strongest supporters were rail car workers, mechanists, railroad shop workers, miners, construction workers, and civil servants. Like in Calgary, the workers organized a strike committee, though the role of this committee was much larger. Under the leadership of Carl Berg, subcommittees were organized for numerous matters including health, safety, and communications. The strike committee put the trains, water supply, and electricity under workers' control. Power was cut off from rich communities, and water was only supplied to hospitals and working class communities.

Teamsters, taxi drivers, carpenters, bricklayers and masons, boilermakers, plumbers, painters, railway carmen, yardmen, freight handlers, machinists, express messengers, steam shovel operators, metal workers, rail maintenance workers, railway clerks, and blacksmiths were all still on strike. Chinese immigrant workers also participated, making the strike multiracial- which was a notable fact in Canada's predominantly white labour movement. The workers congregated in the town square regularly to hear speeches form labour leaders such as Sarah Knight. These meetings were often dispersed violently. The Socialist Party of Canada office was raided and sacked by the RCMP. The general strike lasted for 1 month and cost 24,000 striker days.

=== Toronto general strike ===
On May 26, Toronto, Ontario joined the growing wave of general strikes after a 2:1 vote The core demand of the 19,000 striking workers was an 8 hour working day. The strike was less violent than the previous strike in Vancouver and the ongoing Winnipeg general strike, with only one recorded incident of violence when police were deployed at the Massey-Harris factory to disperse picketers that were opposing the firing of striking workers. The striking workers reached a compromise with employers on May 29, accepting a 48-hour week with a 40-hour guarantee, overtime pay, seniority benefits, and a formal grievance procedure. Many workers including machinists, longshoreman, meat-packing workers, and garment workers continued to strike through June and July, resulting in significant gains in almost all cases. Between May and July 1919, over 34,000 workers struck in Ontario, costing companies 632,409 striker days.

=== Victoria general strike ===
Victoria, British Columbia's workers were divided on whether or not to participate in the Labour Revolt. Although the Victoria Trades and Labor Council declared "One Big Union is the Ideal to be aimed at, the final aim being the workers as a class arrayed against the common enemy", many unions in the city were still dedicated to craft unionism. On 1 June, the Victoria section of the OBU declared a general strike.

Participating in the strike were longshoreman, shipyard workers, mechanists, painters, caulkers and teamsters. Notably, teachers also went on strike, making the Victoria general strike the first teacher's strike in the British Empire. Non-unionized crew members aboard steamships and steel mill workers also walked off the job in support of the strike. On 15 June, the 1,400 strong carpenters union joined the strike, followed by boiler makes on the 21st and metalworkers on the 23rd. Civil servants, electricians, street car workers, and postal workers, who were supportive of craft unionism, opposed the strike.

The Victoria general strike cost 28,000 strikers days and involved well over 5,000 workers.

=== Alberta Coal Strike ===
Following the defeat of the general strikes, 6,500 coal miners organized with the OBU continued to strike into the summer across Alberta. Using J.B McLachlan's tactic of the '100% strike', the miners successfully included maintenance workers and fire bosses in the strike. What had started as a general strike became a pitched battle for the recognition of the OBU by the mining industry.

The Royal Canadian Mounted Police were deployed to protect the mining companies from striking coal miners, and gave the mining companies permission to hire goon squads to break the strike. On 11 August through 1 September, goon squads were paid $10/day (the equivalent of $150 today) and given free alcohol in return for suppressing the strike. The goons patrolled the streets with brass knuckles and crow bars, beating striking miners. Five goons broke into strike leader John Sullivan's house and attempted to physically assault him, but were unsuccessful due to an armed miner intervening. The miner was later arrested because the firearm was illegally owned, the only arrest on either side during the strike.

== Montreal agitation and wild-cat strikes ==
Montreal was Canada's economic centre. It was the country's commercial, industrial and financial hub at the time of the labour revolt. It was also the site of severe civil strife and labour conflicts. In December 1918, 1,500 public sector workers including firefighters, sanitary engineers, and water-workers went on strike. The city administration responded by instituting Taylorism, cutting the workforce, and enlisting business leaders to suppress the strike. Local businesses hired scabs to work in place of the strikers and hired union busters from the Thiel Detective Service. These actions caused a major riot in working class districts; 300 false fire alarms were set off, scabs were violently assaulted, and sent Thiel operatives to the hospital. The efforts of the union were ultimately successful, and the city of Montreal was forced to negotiate with them.

In April, 1919, workers at numerous stores and warehouses refused to receive goods delivered by scabs working for the Dominion Express Company, and then forcefully dispersed guards protecting scabs during a labour dispute at Montreal Light, Heat and Power Company. Shortly after, 4,000 teamsters went on a wild cat strike. The teamsters took over the streets, knocking over cars delivering goods and unloading the cargo onto the street. The Montreal Trades and Labour Council (MTLC) denounced the teamsters' tactics, revealing a divide between rank and file workers, who favoured a more radical approach, and salaried union officials, who were more moderate.

In May 1919, the shipyard workers pressed the MTLC to call a general strike in support of the ones held elsewhere in Canada. The MTLC leadership refused to put the general strike motion to a vote. 12,000 workers from various industries, including shipping and garment making, went on a wildcat strike with 15,000 workers threatening to do the same. The strike prompted a harsh response from both the MTLC and industry, including the Harbour Commission and Canadian Pacific Railway. Between May and July 1919, over 22,000 workers struck in the city of Montreal.

The growth and combativeness of radical labour in Montreal lead to the Catholic Church increases efforts to form a Catholic labour movement, increasing funds, press and personnel to Catholic unions.

== Cape Breton labour wars 1922-1925 ==
The Nova Scotia coalfields, especially on Cape Breton Island, were an important site of class conflict in the early 1920s. In early 1922, the British Empire Steel Corporation (or "BESCO") in Nova Scotia reduced the wages of coal miners by one-third. The workers, organized as District 26 of the United Mine Workers of America had gained official recognition during the 1919 strike wave. Led by J.B. McLachlan, they responded by reducing production by one-third, and by the end of the summer about half of the wage reduction was withdrawn. Smaller strikes took place on a local level during this period over issues of workplace management, supervision, and safety. In 1923, steel workers in Cape Breton struck for the recognition of their union. In support of the steel workers, Cape Breton coal miners went on strike as well. Provincial police were deployed to forcefully disperse the workers, who had congregated to picket the steel plant gates in Whitney Pier. Two labour leaders were arrested, including McLachlan. McLachlan was removed from office by the UMWA and also convicted of seditious libel. The Communist Party of Canada, which McLachlan had joined at the end of 1922, denounced the suppression of the strike. Annie Buller, one of the party's founders and most influential spokesmen traveled to Cape Breton where she assisted the workers in organizing.

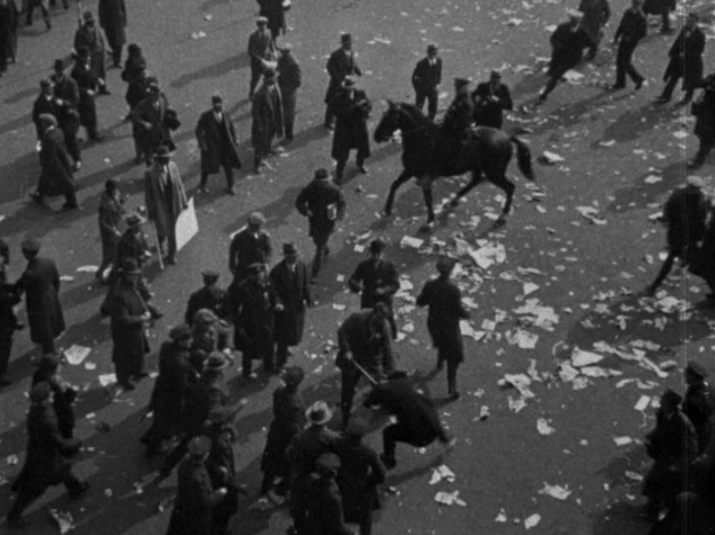
Royal Canadian Mounted Police dispersing striking workers

Over the next two years, the coal miners would strike on and off, culminating in 1925 when BESCO refused to negotiate a new contract with the union and reduced working days. Starting in March 1925, 12,000 miners went on strike. BESCO responded by cutting off the workers' access to company stores.

On June 11, 1925, the as many as 2,000 miners marched on the local power plant at Waterford Lake in an attempt to seize control of it. They were met by company police. When the company police opened fire on the workers. three were injured and coal miner William Davis was killed. The miners then rushed the police, forcing them to retreat. The miners seized control of the power plant, with the cooperation of the 30 power plant workers. The miners also began "liberating" company stores in the coalfields and distributing goods. What became known as the Battle of Waterford Lake ended when 2000 Canadian army soldiers dispersed the miners and restored BESCO's control.

After a royal commission reported in 1926, BESCO was forced to recognize the coal miners' union and negotiate through collective bargaining with the UMWA.

== Outcome ==
The labour revolt failed to become a nationwide general strike that ushered in a co-operative commonwealth, as the OBU had hoped. The One Big Union faced severe repression, being restricted when Prime Minister Arthur Meighen extended the wartime ban on political and labour groups, Section 19. Due to its radical nature, most employers refused to negotiate with the OBU, leading many workers to abandon it for more moderate unions. Their conflict with the more powerful Trades and Labour Congress of Canada and the affiliated American Federation of Labor further weakened the OBU.

Many organizers of the Labour Revolt went on to play large roles in Canada's socialist and labour movement. George Armstrong, one of the organizers of the Winnipeg general strike, was elected to the Manitoba Legislature as a member of the Socialist Party of Canada. Strike leaders Roger Ernest Bray and J.S. Woodsworth (who was elected as Labour MP in 1921) went on found the Co-operative Commonwealth Federation party. J.B McLachlan became leader of the Workers' Unity League, the largest and most active labour union during the Great Depression and a direct affiliate of the Communist Party of Canada.

== See also ==
- List of incidents of civil unrest in Canada
