= Western Labor Conference =

Convention

The Western Labor Conference was a radical Canadian labour convention held March 13-15, 1919, in Calgary. It is known for being the convention at which One Big Union was formally proposed.

Two hundred and thirty-nine delegates from five Canadian provinces attended the event. Alberta sent the largest number of delegates at 89, British Columbia sent 85, Manitoba sent 46, Saskatchewan sent 17, and Ontario sent 2. The British Columbia Federation of Labour, which was viewed as the most militant of any of the attending groups of delegates, proposed several resolutions. They included a six-hour work day, the end of Allied interference in Russia, severance of ties to international unions outside of Canada, the end of the political imprisonment of Canadian citizens, and the acknowledgement of the impediment of labour movements under the capitalist economic system. If these demands were not met by the Canadian government by June 1, 1919, the newly formed One Big Union would call for a general strike. The resolutions concluded with a solidarity greeting addressed to the Russian Bolsheviks and the German Spartacus League. However, they met with opposition from other conference delegates. The more moderate delegates then proposed the idea of polling all registered Canadian trade unionists on the decision to establish One Big Union as well as exiting from the Trades and Labour Congress of Canada and the American Federation of Labor. The motion was defeated. In its place, the conference agreed to form a committee that would familiarize Canadian workers with the concept of One Big Union. The committee consisted of R.J. Johns, W.A. Pritchard, J. Knight, J. Naylor, and V.R. Midgley. The undercover Mountie Frank Zaneth attended as a delegate.
