= Strike! (musical) =

Musical depicting the 1919 Winnipeg General Strike in Canada

- Written by: Danny Schur and Rick Chafe
- Music by: Danny Schur
- Lyrics by: Danny Schur
- Subject: Mike Sokolowski and the 1919 Winnipeg General Strike

Premiere
- Date: May 2005
- Place: Rainbow Stage, Winnipeg, Manitoba
- strikemusical.com/

Strike! is a 2005 historical stage musical depicting the Winnipeg General Strike. It has been adapted into a Canadian Broadcasting Corporation radio production, a 17-minute short film, and the full-length feature film Stand!.

== Content ==
Strike! focuses on Mike Sokolowski, a Ukrainian immigrant from Galicia who was killed by Royal North-West Mounted Police on "Bloody Saturday", 21 June 1919. The account of his life is heavily fictionalized, and is character is composited with another Ukrainian-Canadian labourer. Sokolowski begins the play as an anti-Semite who loathes so-called Jewish Bolshevism, but learns better due in part to a romantic sub-plot involving his godson Stefan (originally Myron) and his Jewish neighbour Rebecca.

== Performances and adaptations ==
After two private workshops in 2003, a public outdoor "preview" of Strike! was performed at Old Market Square in Winnipeg on 15 May 2004. In May 2005, the full play was premiered at Rainbow Stage in Winnipeg's Kildonan Park as an independent production. The next fall, a revamped version premiered at Saskatoon's Persephone Theatre.

On 15 May 2007, a special performance at Winnipeg's Burton Cummings Theatre was recorded for national broadcast on CBC Radio. The theatre was chosen in part because it had been used as a meeting-place for labour activists prior to the 1919 strike. The radio adaptation was broadcast on Labour Day, 3 September 2007. In May 2009, an outdoor, street spectacle version of the musical premiered in front of Winnipeg City Hall—the site of the original events that inspired the musical. Summer productions of the full-scale musical were held at the Canwest Centre for the Performing Arts in July/August 2009 and 2010. The Edmonton premiere of the musical occurred on 24 April 2013 in conjunction with Workshop West Theatre, at the Timms Centre for the Performing Arts.

=== Adaptations ===
An interactive script/CD book based on Strike! was released by Playwrights Canada Press on 10 December 2007.

Mike's Bloody Saturday, a documentary film about the events that inspired the musical (i.e., the controversy surrounding the death of Mike Sokolowski), premiered on 7 October 2011, and was written, produced, and directed by Danny Schur—the composer/producer/co-writer of Strike!.

A 17-minute film adaptation of Strike! was produced in 2007, and was meant to solicit interest in producing a feature film—which came to be with the 2019 film Stand!.

== Financing ==
Strike! was primarily financed by a limited partnership of investors from across Canada, with a mix of arts grants and donations from Canadian labour unions.

== Cast and crew ==
Strike! was created by Danny Schur, who wrote the music and lyrics and co-wrote the text with Rick Chafe.

Character	Cast			
Character	Original (2005, Winnipeg)	Winnipeg (excl. original)	Radio (2007)	Edmonton (2013)
Mike Sokolowski	Jay Brazeau	Cory Wojcik	Jeff Skinner	Frederick Zbryski
Rebecca Almazoff	Catherine Wreford	Erin McGrath	Adrienne Merrell	Ellie Heath
Stefan Dudar	Marc Devigne	Jeremy Walmsley	Marc Devigne	Scott Shpeley
Moishe Almazoff	David Friedman	Simon Miron		Ryan Parker
Senator Gideon Robertson	Christopher Ryan	Steven Ratzlaff	Kevin Aichele	Stephen Sparks
O'Reilly	Carson Nattrass	Tom Keenan		Chris W. Cook
Emma the Maid	Sharon Bajer	Andrea Del Campo		Kendra Connor
Captain McDougall	Jon Ted Wynne	Arne McPherson		Troy O'Donnell
James Ashdown	Stan Lesk			Paul Morgan Donald
Susan Ashdown	Melanie Whyte	Melanie Whyte		Annette Loiselle
Carmichael	Kevin Aichele	Derek Leenhouts		Cole Humeny
Other	Jeremy Koz as The Union Rep; Matt Kippen as the Meeting Leader / Wallace; Stacey Nattrass as The Immigrant Woman; Brenda Gorlick as Mrs. Olynyk; Ilena Zaramba as a Telephone Operator; Cherise Kotelniski as a Telephone Operator; Dana Horrox as The Suffragette; Taras Luchak as Bronfman / McCready; Jeff Kohut as a Veteran / Special; Tyson Wiebe as a Veteran / Special	Kevin McIntyre as A.J. Andrews		

== Sources ==
- Vancouver Sun: Strike! works for radio special, 27 August 2007
- The Ukrainian Weekly (Ottawa): Ukrainian Canadian's musical dramatizes Winnipeg General Strike, 5 June 2005
- Winnipeg Labour Council website: STRIKE New Musical Celebrates the Winnipeg Strike of 1919, 12 May 2005
- National Union of Public and General Sector Employees website: New musical celebrates the Winnipeg Strike of 1919, 10 April 2005
