= Tom Moore (trade unionist) =

Canadian carpenter and trade unionist

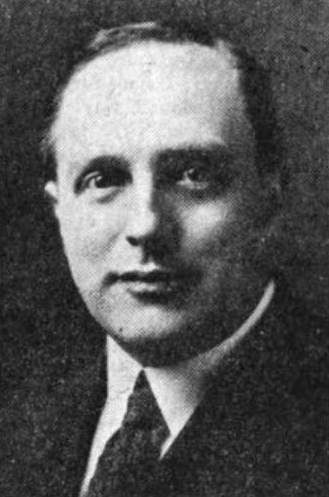
- Moore c. 1927

President of the Trades and Labor Congress of Canada
- In office 1918–1935
- Preceded by: James C. Watters
- Succeeded by: Paddy Draper
- In office 1938–1943
- Preceded by: Paddy Draper
- Succeeded by: Percy Bengough

Personal details
- Born: 1878 Leeds, West Yorkshire, England
- Died: 6 July 1943 (aged 64)
- Occupation: Carpenter and trade unionist

Tom Moore (1878 – 6 July 1943) was an Anglo-Canadian carpenter and trade unionist from Ontario.

== Biography ==
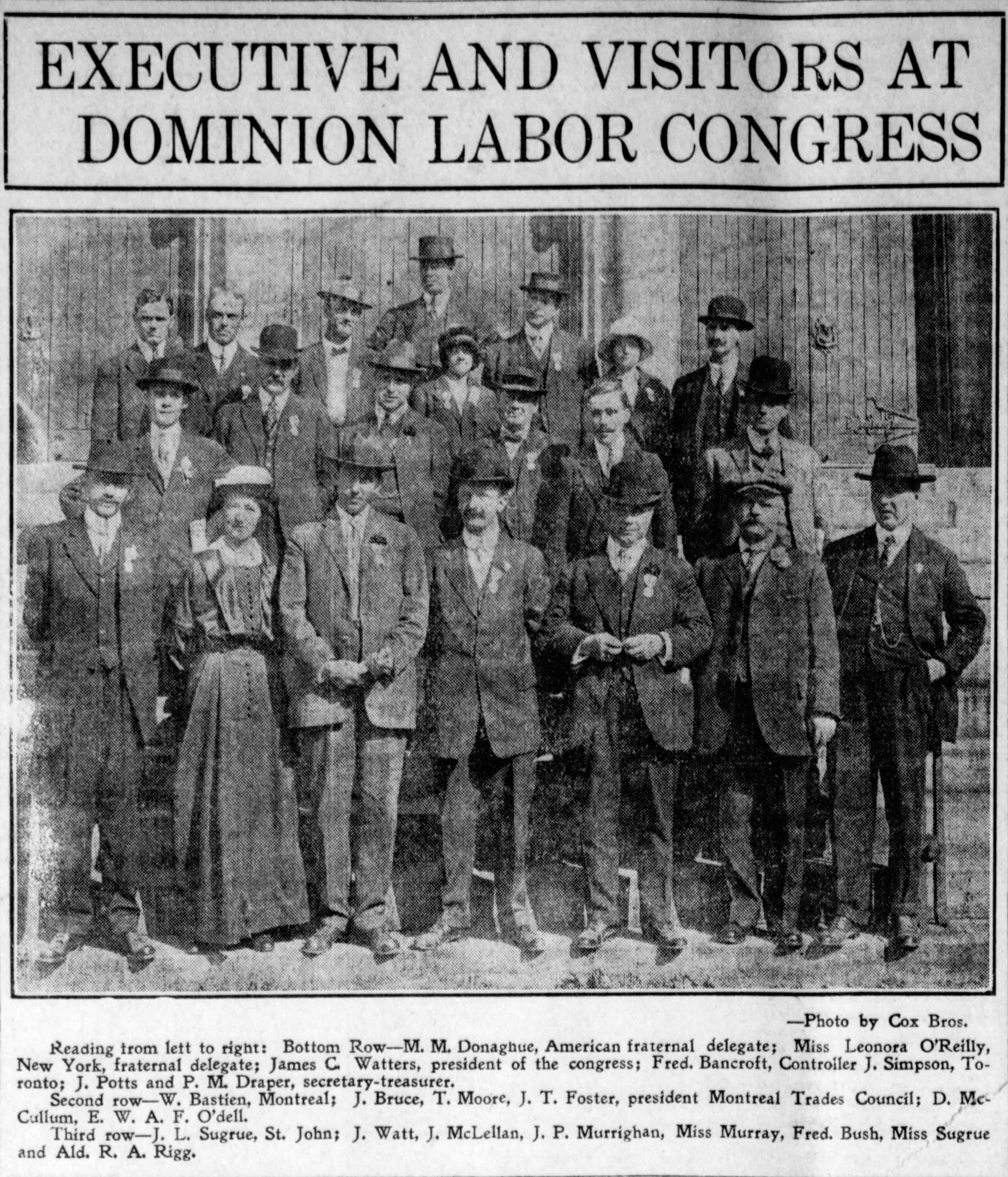
Moore (middle row, third from left) at the Dominion Labor Congress, 1914

Moore was born in Leeds, West Yorkshire, England. He emigrated to Canada in 1909 at the age of 31 and settled in Niagara Falls, Ontario. He was active in the United Brotherhood of Carpenters and Joiners of America at both the local and regional level, including working as an organizer for Eastern Canada from 1911 to 1918. In 1919, he served on the Royal Commission on Industrial Relations (Mathers Commission). In 1920, Moore was elected president of the American Federation of Labor-affiliated Trades and Labor Congress of Canada, a position he held until 1935. In 1938, he was re-elected to the position, which he held until 1943. He opposed radical unionism, including the One Big Union movement.

He was later a delegate to the International Labour Organization.
