= Donald MacDonald (Nova Scotia politician) =

Canadian politician (1909–1986)

Donald MacDonald OC
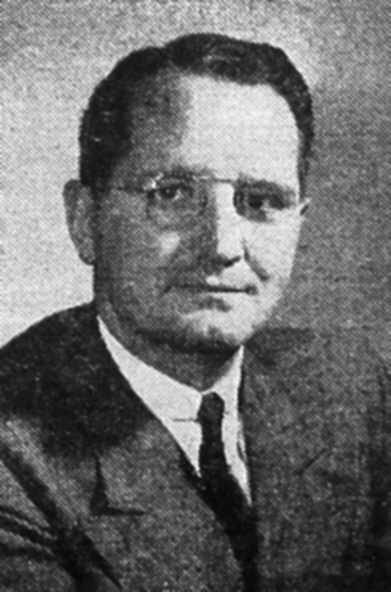
- MacDonald c. 1954

2nd President of the Canadian Labour Congress
- In office 1967–1974
- Preceded by: Claude Jodoin
- Succeeded by: Joe Morris

1st Secretary-Treasurer of the Canadian Labour Congress
- In office 1956–1967
- President: Claude Jodoin
- Preceded by: Federation founded
- Succeeded by: William Dodge

Secretary-Treasurer of the Canadian Congress of Labour
- In office 1951–1956
- Preceded by: Pat Conroy
- Succeeded by: Federation merged

1st Leader of the Nova Scotia Co-operative Commonwealth Federation
- In office 1941–1945
- Preceded by: new party
- Succeeded by: Russell Cunningham

Member of the Legislative Assembly
- In office 28 October 1941 – 23 October 1945
- Preceded by: George M. Morrison
- Succeeded by: John Smith MacIvor
- Constituency: Cape Breton South
- Majority: 62 votes

Personal details
- Born: 12 September 1909 Halifax, Nova Scotia, Canada
- Died: 25 September 1986 (aged 77) Ottawa, Ontario, Canada
- Party: Co-operative Commonwealth Federation
- Spouse: Gertrude MacDonald
- Children: 1
- Education: St. Francis Xavier University
- Occupation: Trade Unionist/Politician

Donald MacDonald OC (12 September 1909 – 25 September 1986) was a Canadian social democratic politician and trade unionist who led the Nova Scotia Co-operative Commonwealth Federation and was elected as a member of the Nova Scotia House of Assembly in 1941. In 1968 he was elected President of the Canadian Labour Congress (CLC).

== Early life ==
He was born in Halifax on 12 September 1909. His family moved to Sydney, Nova Scotia, on Cape Breton Island when he was still a boy. By age 17, he was working at the coal piers at the Sydney Steel Plant. His education included graduating from Sydney Academy High School and attending St. Francis Xavier University (St. F.X.).

== Early union experience ==
At the age of 21, Donald MacDonald became the president of the United Mine Workers (UMW) Local 4560. He worked at the pier throughout the 1930s.

== CCF MLA ==
After the UMW strike of 1940, MacDonald wanted labour to have an active voice in the provincial legislature. He served on the Nova Scotia Co-operative Commonwealth Federation's (CCF) governing board known as the provincial council from 1940 until 1951. In 1941, he then ran for and won the CCF's nomination for the provincial electoral district (riding) of Cape Breton South. He won the 1941 provincial election by a mere 62 votes over Liberal incumbent MLA George Mackay Morrison. Being one of three CCF candidates elected, he became the leader of the CCF party in the Nova Scotia Assembly until 1945.

He ran for re-election in 1945, and gained 440 votes over his previous total but due to gerrymandering lost a close election to Liberal John Smith MacIvor. The CCF lost Cape Breton South, but still retained two seats on the island and in the House of Assembly. His successor as party leader, Russell Cunningham was elected in Cape Breton East in the 1945 election, making up for the loss of Cape Breton South.

== Canadian Congress of Labour ==
In 1942, he joined the organizing staff of the Canadian Congress of Labour (CCL). After his 1945 loss in the Cape Breton South riding, he became the regional director of the Maritime Provinces. In 1951, he became the CCL's secretary-treasurer and chief executive officer. He was very much a part of the organizational force that created the Canada Labour Congress in 1956.

== President of the CLC ==
He was elected secretary-treasurer at the 1956 founding convention of the CLC. In 1967, during Canada's Centennial Year, MacDonald was appointed acting president of the CLC in September, due to Claude Jodoin being incapacitated by illness. The position formally became his when he was elected president in a 1968 convention. He served three two year terms and resigned in 1974.

During this period, he became the first non-European to be elected president of the International Confederation of Free Trade Unions. He retired in 1974.

Donald MacDonald was recognized for his contribution to Canada's business and political life. On 22 December 1972 he was appointed an Officer of the Order of Canada. His other honours include: the Canadian Centennial Medal; the Order of Merit of the Federal Republic of Germany.

After a long battle with cancer, MacDonald died in a hospital, in the nation's capital, Ottawa, on 25 September 1986.

Nova Scotia House of Assembly
Preceded by George M. Morrison	Member of the Legislative Assembly for Cape Breton South; 1941–1945	Succeeded by John Smith MacIvor
Party political offices
New political party	Leader of the Nova Scotia; Co-operative Commonwealth Federation; 1941–1945	Succeeded by Russell Cunningham
Trade union offices
Preceded by Pat Conroy	Secretary-Treasurer of the Canadian Congress of Labour; 1951–1956	Succeeded by Federation merged
Preceded by Claude Jodoin	President of the Canadian Labour Congress; 1967–1974	Succeeded by Joe Morris
Preceded by Bruno Storti	President of the International Confederation of Free Trade Unions; 1972–1975	Succeeded by P. P. Narayanan
