= Canadian Brotherhood of Railway Employees =

Canadian industrial union

The Canadian Brotherhood of Railway Employees and Other Transport Workers was an industrial union of railway workers in Canada. It was formed on October 12, 1908, in Moncton, New Brunswick. The organization was led by its president Aaron Mosher from its establishment until 1952. The union was an opponent of larger railway worker unions based in the United States. It was a founding member of the Canadian Congress of Labour and ally of the Co-operative Commonwealth Federation (CCF).

== Racism ==
The union's constitution explicitly banned non-white workers from membership from 1908 until 1919. Because of this, Black Canadian sleeping car porters organized the Canadian affiliate of the all-Black Brotherhood of Sleeping Car Porters in 1917. While Sleeping Car Porters were allowed to join the CBRE in 1919, Black workers were segregated into their own locals and forced into lower-paid jobs. The Sleeping Car Porters eventually left in 1939 and affiliated with the U.S. based and Black-led Brotherhood of Sleeping Car Porters. Asian Canadian workers, especially Chinese, were also barred from the union.

== See also ==
- Racism in Canada
