= Pat Conroy (trade unionist) =

Scottish-Canadian trade unionist (1900–1988)

Pat Conroy (1900–1988) was a Scottish-Canadian trade unionist. Born in Baillieston, Scotland, he began work at the age of 13 as a miner in Great Britain and joined the Miners' Federation of Great Britain. In 1919, he emigrated to Canada and settled in Drumheller, Alberta. He was a founding leader of the Canadian Congress of Labour. In 1949, he helped establish the International Confederation of Free Trade Unions. Following a dispute with other leaders, Conroy resigned in 1951. He died on 8 April 1988.

Trade union offices
Preceded by Federation founded	Secretary-Treasurer of the Canadian Congress of Labour; 1941–1951	Succeeded by Donald MacDonald
