= Waterford Lake =

Lake in Nova Scotia, Canada

- Location within Nova Scotia
- Location: New Waterford, Nova Scotia, Canada
- Coordinates: 46°14′20.36″N 60°7′29.68″W

Waterford Lake is the main water supply for New Waterford, Nova Scotia, Canada.

It was the scene of the beginning of the "battle of New Waterford" during the coal mine strikes of 1925 that occurred as part of the 1920s-era Cape Breton labour Wars.
