= Gideon Robertson =

Canadian politician

The Honourable Gideon Decker Robertson PC
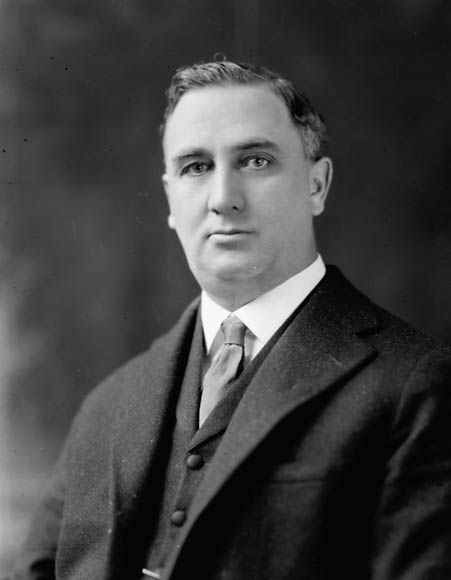

Canadian Senator from Ontario
- In office January 20, 1917 – August 25, 1933
- Appointed by: Robert Borden

Personal details
- Born: August 26, 1874 Welland County, Ontario, Canada
- Died: August 25, 1933 (aged 58) Ottawa, Ontario, Canada
- Party: Conservative
- Cabinet: Minister Without Portfolio (1917–1918); Minister of Labour (1918–1921 & 1930–1932)

Gideon Decker Robertson, PC (August 26, 1874 – August 25, 1933) was a Canadian Senator and Canadian Cabinet minister.

== Background ==
Robertson was a telegrapher by profession and had links with conservatives in the labour movement. In January 1917, he was appointed to the Senate as a Conservative as a means of bringing in labour representation during the First World War. When Prime Minister Sir Robert Borden formed a Unionist government in October as a means of creating a national government for the war effort, he included Robertson in the cabinet, making him minister without portfolio despite not having a seat in the House of Commons, to represent organised labour.

== Political career ==
On November 8, 1918, Robertson became Minister of Labour.

He held this portfolio in 1919 during the Winnipeg General Strike. At the beginning of the strike Robertson and Minister of Interior Arthur Meighen went to the city to meet the "Citizens' Committee of 1000" which had been formed by local businessmen and professionals in opposition to the strike. He refused to meet the Central Strike Committee to hear their demands.

Robertson ordered federal government employees to return to work or lose their jobs.

On June 17, he ordered the arrest of the twelve principal strike leaders, including J. S. Woodsworth. Robertson also supported the government's decision to send in the Royal North-West Mounted Police to crush the strike in an action that became known as "Bloody Saturday".

Robertson earned the longstanding enmity of the left and labour movement for his role in the strike. Despite his background, most of the working class did not consider him a legitimate representative of workers.

Robertson retained his position as labour minister when Arthur Meighen became Prime Minister of Canada until the government's defeat in the 1921 federal election.

Robertson returned to government when R. B. Bennett's Conservatives won the 1930 election, and again became Minister of Labour, but remained unpopular with his constituents.

When visiting Winnipeg in 1932, six thousand workers met him at the railway station with the slogan: "A Faker Comes to Town." He stepped down as Labour minister in February and died in Ottawa the next year, two weeks after being paralyzed by a stroke.
