= Rick Chafe =

Canadian playwright

Rick Chafe is a Canadian playwright from Winnipeg, Manitoba. He is most noted for his play The Secret Mask, which was a shortlisted finalist for the Governor General's Award for English-language drama at the 2014 Governor General's Awards.

His other plays have included Zac and Speth, The Last Man and Woman on Earth, Marriage: A Demolition in Two Acts, adaptations of Homer's The Odyssey and Leon Rooke's Shakespeare's Dog, and a collaboration with Danny Schur on the musical Strike!.
