= All-Canadian Congress of Labour =

20th-century trade union centre

- Abbreviation: ACCL
- Merged into: Canadian Congress of Labour
- Formation: 1926
- Dissolved: 1940
- Type: Trade union centre
- Location: Canada
- President: Aaron Mosher
- Secessions: Workers' Unity League

The All-Canadian Congress of Labour (ACCL) was a Canadian national labour confederation, which existed from 1926 to 1940.

It was founded in 1926 as a rival to the Trades and Labour Congress. It was headed by Aaron Mosher. It included remnants of the One Big Union and had over 40,000 members. The ACCL was opposed to American interference in the Canadian labour movement. In 1929, the communist unions left the ACCL and formed the Workers' Unity League. In 1940, the ACCL merged with Canadian sections of the Congress of Industrial Organizations to form the Canadian Congress of Labour.
