= Urbain Lafontaine =

Canadian labour movement leader

Urbain Lafontaine (1845 – 19 January 1913) was a typographer, trade union leader, newspaper owner, and municipal official from Quebec. He was one of the leading figures of the labour movement in Quebec in the late nineteenth and early twentieth centuries.

Born in Trois-Rivières, Canada East, he trained as a typographer as a youth before moving to New York City. He returned to Canada in 1866 and defended Ontario during the Fenian raids. After settling in Montreal, he helped organized the Union Typographique Jacques-Cartier, which was the Montreal branch of the International Typographical Union. He and Olivier-David Benoît co-founded the first French-speaking branch of the Knights of Labor in Montreal in 1883. From 1891 to 1893, he served as president of the Union Typographique Jacques-Cartier. In 1892, he was elected workman (president) of the local assembly of the Knights of Labor.
