= Canadian Congress of Labour =

20th-century trade union centre

- Abbreviation: CCL
- Predecessor: All-Canadian Congress of Labour; Congress of Industrial Organizations
- Merged into: Canadian Labour Congress
- Formation: 1940
- Dissolved: 1956
- Type: Trade union centre
- Location: Canada
- Members: 100,000–250,000
- President: Aaron Mosher
- Secretary-treasurers: Pat Conroy; Donald MacDonald
- Affiliations: Co-operative Commonwealth Federation

The Canadian Congress of Labour (CCL; French: Congrès canadien du travail) was an industrial workers' union federation in Canada. Affiliated with the United States–based Congress of Industrial Organizations (CIO). It was founded in 1940 and merged with Trades and Labour Congress of Canada (TLC) to form the Canadian Labour Congress (CLC) in 1956.

== Founding ==
In 1939, the Congress of Industrial Organizations (CIO) supporters were expelled from the TLC, due to the demands of the American Federation of Labor (AFL). This split had to do with the CIO unionizing industrial trades, and the AFL organizing craft trades. The expelled unions included the Steel Workers Organizing Committee, now called the United Steelworkers (USW); United Auto Workers of America, now Unifor; and the United Mine Workers of America (UMWA). They negotiated with the All-Canadian Congress of Labour and founded the Canadian Congress of Labour in 1940 to rival the TLC. At its founding, it had 100,000 members, and grew to 250,000 by 1943.

The Congress' founding executive included Aaron Mosher (Canadian Brotherhood of Railway Employees), Silby Barrett, Sol Spivak, and Charles Millard (Steelworkers). They were all members of the social democratic Co-operative Commonwealth Federation (CCF) political party. They were united in the belief that labour should be involved in politics.

In 1981 a postage stamp, depicting Mosher flanked by two railway workers, was issued to commemorate the centenary of Mosher's birth.

== Leadership ==
=== Presidents ===
1940: Aaron Mosher

=== Secretary-Treasurers ===
1941: Pat Conroy
1951: Donald MacDonald
