= James C. Watters =

Canadian coal miner and trade unionist

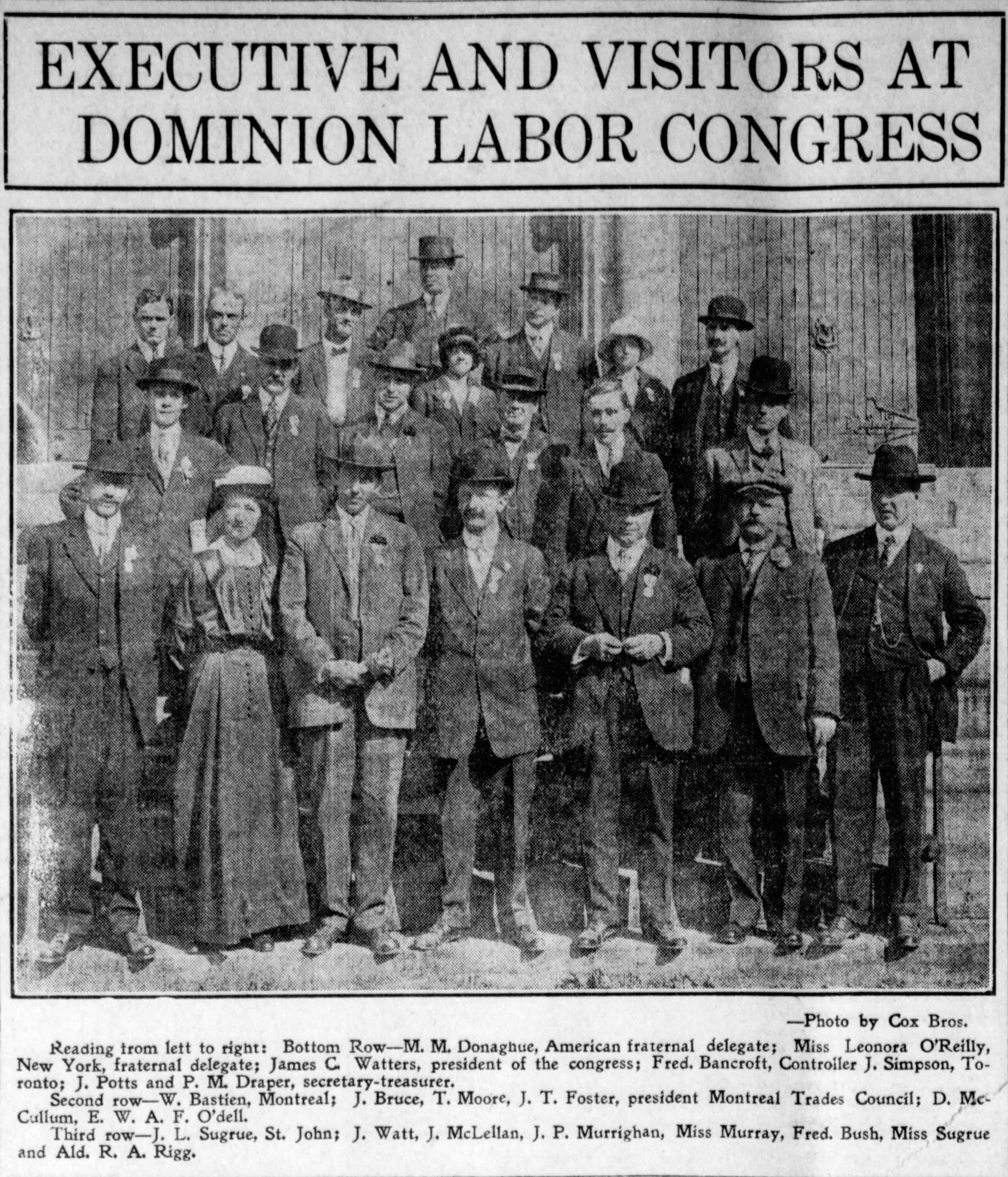
- Watters (front row, third from left) at the Dominion Labor Congress, 1914

President of the Trades and Labor Congress of Canada
- In office 1911–1918
- Preceded by: William Glockling
- Succeeded by: Tom Moore

Personal details
- Born: 1869 Edinburgh, Scotland
- Died: 1947 (aged 77–78)
- Occupation: Coal miner, trade unionist

James C. Watters (1869-1947) was a Scottish-Canadian coal miner and trade union leader.

== Life ==
Born in Edinburgh, Watters emigrated to Canada, eventually ending up in British Columbia. In that province, he worked as a coal miner and, in 1910, was elected founding president of the BC Federation of Labour. A year later, he was elected president of the Trades and Labor Congress of Canada, a position he held until losing re-election in 1918.
