= Aaron Mosher =

Canadian trade unionist (1881–1959)

Aaron Roland Mosher CBE (May 10, 1881 – September 26, 1959) was a Canadian labour leader and trade unionist. In 1908, he became founding president of the Canadian Brotherhood of Railway Employees, a position he held until 1952.

The policies of the CBRE under Mosher led to the formation of the Canadian affiliate of the all-black Brotherhood of Sleeping Car Porters.

For his work during World War II, he was made a Commander in the Order of the British Empire. In 1981, commemorating the centenary of his birth, a postage stamp was issued depicting Mosher flanked by two railway workers.

== See also ==
- Black Canadians
