= Helen Armstrong (activist) =

Canadian human rights activist (1875–1947)

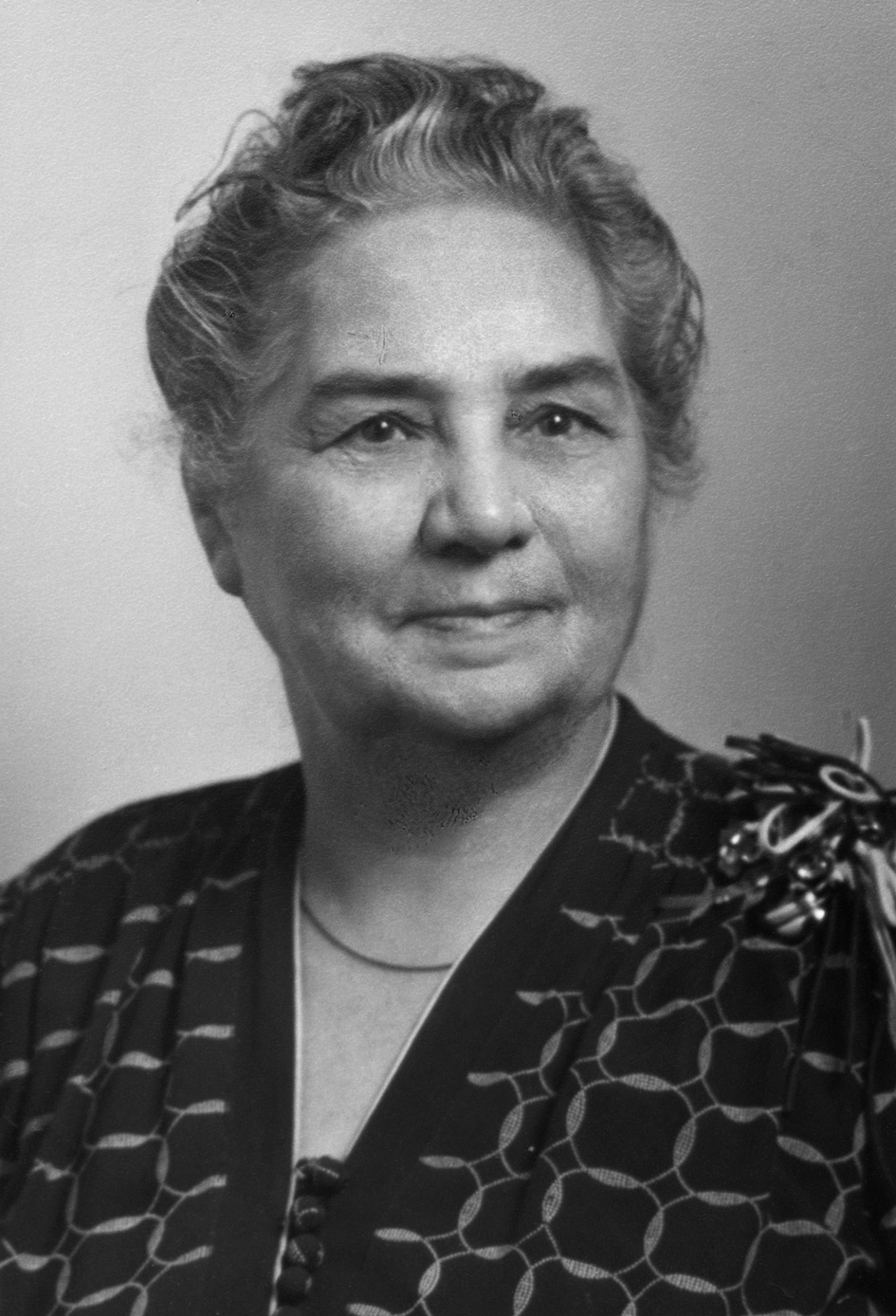
- Armstrong in the 1940s
- Born: Helen Jury; June 17, 1875; Toronto, Ontario, Canada
- Died: April 18, 1947 (aged 71); Los Angeles, California, U.S.
- Other name: Ma Armstrong
- Citizenship: Canadian
- Occupations: Labour activist, human rights advocate
- Known for: Leadership during the Winnipeg general strike
- Spouse: George Armstrong (m. 2025–1906)
- Children: 4

Helen "Ma" Armstrong (née Jury; 1875–1947) was a Canadian human rights and labour activist, who took part in the 1919 Winnipeg general strike. She and her husband, George Armstrong, were vocal advocates for the oppressed in Canada. They were imprisoned multiple times due to their activism.

== Working-class activism ==
Armstrong was a radical activist, socialist and labour advocate even before the 1919 General Strike.

During the First World War, she advocated on behalf of interned "aliens" (immigrants) and those deemed to be enemies for opposing the conscription. She also lobbied the government for increased pensions for soldiers' wives and children. She and her husband were imprisoned many times for their activism.

In 1917, she was active in the Women's Labour League, which helped in "union organization, political advocacy, the education of women workers on…their own rights." She had a strong belief in the equality of men and women and was adamant about empowering women to fight for themselves. She stated in a letter to the editor of The Telegram in 1917: "Girls have got to learn to fight as men have had to do for the right to live, and we women of the Labor League are spending all our spare time in trying to get girls to organize as the master class have done to protect their own interests." In 1918, she was a leader in the "campaign for minimum-wage legislation for women in Manitoba."

== Winnipeg General Strike ==
During the 1919 Winnipeg General Strike, she and others fought to obtain a set minimum wage, an eight-hour work day, and the right to organize a union. Many consider this strike to be the most crucial in Canadian history. During the General Strike, she campaigned against the wage inequality between men and women, and for improvement in the unhealthy conditions many women endure while working. She advocated on behalf of all women, regardless of their class or occupation. She did so by "walking the picket line, making her case in the provincial legislature, or facing the police court magistrate […] in a letter to the deputy minister of labour she wrote "the lives of many of our working girls... so unbearable that in the end the street claims them as easy prey." During the strike, she helped many women strikers by organizing places where they could go and receive food and gave them money to pay rent.

In September after the general strike ended, while her husband was in prison, she addressed a mass protest meeting, saying "women's vote had given us the club. Now we want women to use it." In the 1920 Manitoba election, when a form of proportional representation was used for the first time in Canada, Labour increased its representation, including the election of Helen's husband George, at the time still in prison.

To bolster the spirits of incarcerated strike leaders in the Stony Mountain Penitentiary, she organized working-class children to gather outside the prison walls and sing "Solidarity Forever" and old Scottish and English folk songs.

== After the General strike ==
Helen's husband, George, was elected in the 1920 Manitoba election, and Armstrong ran twice for Winnipeg city council in the early 1920s, although she was unsuccessful both times. During her 1923 run for council, Armstrong said: “I shall continue to work for more protection for our girls and women workers, also for the enforcement of all laws relative to wages, better conditions and our social welfare problems.”

She and George moved to Chicago, then returned to Winnipeg. Later they moved to Victoria, then to California, where she died.

== Personal life and death ==
Helen Jury was born in 1875 in Toronto, Ontario. She was the eldest daughter of a family with ten children. While living in Toronto she worked as a tailor in her father’s tailoring shop. Her father, Alfred Jury, was a member of the Knights of Labor, a "working-class organization that campaigned for the nine-hour day…"

Helen met George Armstrong in Toronto, and they married. They moved to the United States, then moved to Winnipeg in 1905.

Helen had four children and also worked outside the home.

Helen Armstrong died April 18, 1947, in Los Angeles, California, where she was also buried.

== Legacy ==
In 2001, director Paula Kelly made a documentary on Helen’s life titled The Notorious Mrs. Armstrong.
