= Trades and Labor Congress of Canada =

- Abbreviation: TLC
- Federation merger: Canadian Labour Congress
- Founded: 1883
- Dissolved: 1956
- Headquarters: Toronto
- Location: Canada
- Members: 200,000+ (1924)

The Trades and Labor Congress of Canada was a Canada-wide central federation of trade unions active from 1883/1886 to 1956. It was founded at the initiative of the Toronto Trades and Labour Council and the Knights of Labor. It was the third attempt at a national labour federation to be formed in Canada: it succeeded the Canadian Labour Union which existed from 1873 to 1877 and the Canadian Labour Congress which held only one conference in 1881.

In December 1883, the Toronto Trades and Labor Council, under its president Charles March, convened roughly 50 delegates from various Toronto workers' organizations to discuss forming a Canadian union central; the meeting attracted mainly Toronto unionists, with no one attending from outside Ontario. It adopted policies which denounced government supported immigration, the Salvation Army for its alleged efforts to bring London's poor to Canada; it opposed any Asian immigration, called for female factory inspectors to protect women workers, a single tax system, government only issued currency (Banks issued money at this time), the end of child labour, and the use of convict labour. This first meeting did not establish a permanent organizational structure; that took shape only at the second assembly, in 1886.

== History ==
The Toronto Trades and Labour Council began in 1881, and similar citywide coordinating bodies were soon formed in Montreal, Vancouver, Brantford, Ottawa and other cities. They banded together in 1886 as The Trades and Labour Congress of Canada. At first it primarily represented Ontario and Quebec, but it gained national reach over the following decade by establishing provincial legislative committees to lobby provincial governments, in Manitoba (1896), British Columbia (1896), and New Brunswick (1899). It helped resolve jurisdictional disputes among its member unions. It used lobbying to secure wage and protective legislation, workmen's compensation, sanitary regulation of workshops, and the eight-hour day. Although few members were factory workers, it helped lobby for factory acts in Ontario, Quebec, Manitoba and Nova Scotia. It supported the Liberal Party move in 1900 to create the federal Department of Labour, with a system of negotiations to settle Labour disputes. It was challenged by the American-based American Federation of Labor led by Samuel Gompers, who sought to unite the movements in Canada and the U.S. In 1902 Gompers effectively took control of the Congress. Gompers's policies tended to ignore the particularities of the Canadian labour force, especially the French-Canadian separatism in Quebec, the political impulses in the Prairies, and the left-wing socialism of the coal miners in Nova Scotia.

The Trades and Labor Congress of Canada also agitated against immigrant workers, especially the Chinese, who were seen as unsavory pawns used by capitalists to lower wages and undermine unions.

=== Principles ===
The TLC developed a 'Platform of Principles' comprising 16 points. Added to its first adopted policies were:

- free compulsory education,
- an eight-hour work day and a six-day work week,
- government inspection of industry,
- minimum living wage,
- public ownership of railways, telegraphs, waterworks, lighting,
- abolition of the Senate,
- use of union label,
- abolition of property qualifications to vote,
- arbitration,
- proportional representation and the use of referendums.

In 1906, following debate between reform and socialist factions within the Congress, the TLC endorsed the creation of an independent workers' political party; TLC leaders including Ralph Smith and Alphonse Verville subsequently ran for public office. In 1913 the vote for women was added as a 17th principle.

=== 1900–1929 ===
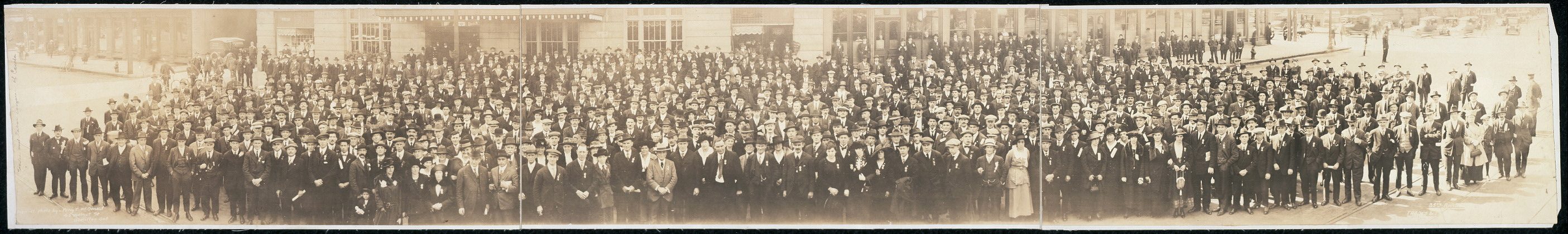
Thirty-fifth annual meeting of the Trades and Labour Congress, Hamilton, 1919.

By 1900 the TLC had become the country's first truly national body. As the Knights of Labor declined in number unions representing skilled trades workers came to dominate the TLC. By the 1890s Samuel Gompers in the U.S. was planning an international federation of labour, starting with the expansion of AFL affiliates in Canada, especially Ontario. He helped the Trades and Labour Congress with money and organizers, and by 1902. At the 1902 TLC conference in Berlin (Kitchener), Ontario, under the influence of the American Federation of Labor (AFL) and its unions in Canada, the Knights along with the purely Canadian unions were banned from membership. Twenty-three unions were expelled in total; they promptly formed a rival body, the National Trades and Labor Congress, which was reorganized as the Canadian Federation of Labour in 1908. The AFL came to dominate the Canadian union movement, although there were also radical unions in British Columbia and Catholic ones in Quebec.

Under President James Watters (1911–18), the TLC was initially opposed to the First World War but reversed its position as their members rushed to the patriotic call of the federal government and the British Empire.

While long-lived, the TLC underwent a number of splits and challenges as the labour movement developed. In the twentieth century the TLC faced rivals on the left in the form of syndicalist or socialist movements such as the Industrial Workers of the World and the One Big Union. In failing to respond to the demands of the mostly western workers who wanted more radical actions in the years following World War I, the TLC lost their confidence. They broke away from their AFL/TLC unions and formed the One Big Union following the Winnipeg General Strike in 1919. By 1924, despite these losses, TLC membership had risen to more than 200,000, though the broader slowdown in unionization between 1920 and 1924 cost the Congress roughly 50,000 members over that period.

=== 1930–1956 ===
The leadership of Canadian labour was challenged at the start of the Great Depression with the establishment of the Workers' Unity League (1929–1936). In 1935 unions that wanted to organize unskilled workers in the new mass industries of automobile, steel and rubber broke with the AFL and formed the Congress of Industrial Organizations (CIO). The latter's strategy of industrial unionism was a direct challenge to the TLC (and AFL's) craft unionism.

Interest in the CIO was sparked in Canada when in 1937 more than 4,000 workers at General Motors in Oshawa joined the United Automobile Workers, a CIO union, and fought a strike for union recognition. In 1939, CIO supporters were expelled from the TLC and joined with the national All-Canadian Congress of Labour to form the rival Canadian Congress of Labour (CCL) in 1940. The TLC continued to be the voice of skilled trades workers in the country.

As the Cold War and the rise of anti-Communism led to purges of leftists from unions in the United States, both the TLC and the CCL undertook similar campaigns against Communist-led affiliates in Canada. On June 3, 1949, the TLC suspended the Communist-led Canadian Seamen's Union (CSU), after the AFL and 14 of the TLC's own international-union affiliates threatened to secede unless the CSU was expelled; the suspension followed an unsuccessful CSU strike earlier that year, and the union was formally disaffiliated in 1950. The TLC similarly suspended the United Fishermen and Allied Workers Union for alleged Communist leadership in the 1950s. Just as these purges culminated in the creation of the AFL–CIO in 1955 in the United States, the parallel process in Canada led to the merger of the TLC and the CCL in 1956 to create the modern Canadian Labour Congress.

== Leadership ==
=== Presidents ===
1886: Charles March
1888: John T. Carey
1890: Urbain Lafontaine
1892:
1896: David Carey
1898: Ralph Smith
1902: John A. Flett
1904: Alphonse Verville
1909: William Glockling
1911: James C. Watters
1918: Tom Moore
1935: Paddy Draper
1938: Tom Moore
1943: Percy Bengough
1954: Claude Jodoin

=== Secretary-Treasurers ===
1886: David Hastings
1888: George W. Dower
1900: Paddy Draper
1935: Robert J. Tallon
1940: Arthur D'Aoust
1943: Pat Sullivan
1947: John W. Buckley
1949: Gordon G. Cushing
