= Percy Bengough =

Percy Bengough (1883-10 August 1972) was an English-Canadian machinist and trade union leader. Born in 1883 in London, England, Bengough emigrated to Canada in 1905. Employed as a machinist, he was active in trade unions, including the Amalgamated Society of Engineers and, beginning in 1916, the International Association of Machinists.

From 1921 to 1942, Bengough served as secretary of the secretary of the Vancouver Trades and Labor Council. In 1931, he was elected vice president of Trades and Labor Congress of Canada before being elected TLC president from 1943 to 1954. In 1956, he successfully supported the merge of the TLC and its former competitor, the Canadian Labour Congress. In 1949, he was one of the founders of the anti-communist International Confederation of Free Trade Unions and served on its served executive board.

In politics, he was a moderate with close ties to the Liberal Party of Canada. He also supported the creation of Canadian unions rather than the more common process of Canadian unions affiliating with an existing union based in the United States.
