= Winnipeg general strike =

1919 strike in Canada

Winnipeg General Strike
- Part of the Canadian Labour Revolt
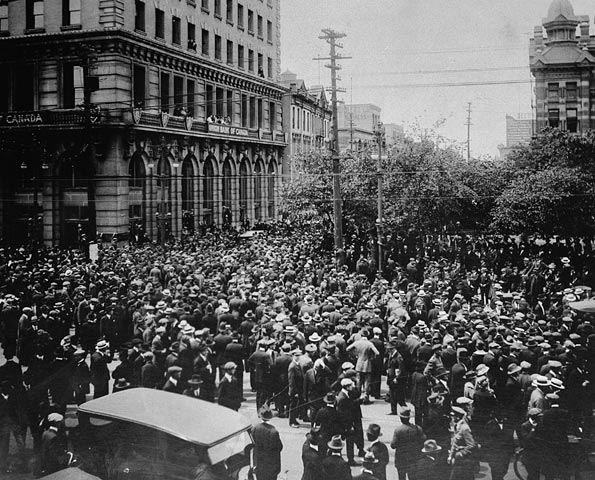
- Crowd gathered outside old City Hall during the Winnipeg general strike, June 21, 1919
- Date: May 15 – June 26, 1919
- Location: Winnipeg; 49°53′04″N 97°08′47″W
- Methods: Strikes, protests, demonstrations

Parties
Winnipeg Trades and Labour Council	Citizens' Committee of One Thousand; Royal North-West Mounted Police

Lead figures
J. S. Woodsworth; George Armstrong; Roger Ernest Bray; Abraham Albert Heaps; William Ivens; Robert B. Russell; John Queen	Arthur Meighen (Acting Minister of Justice); Gideon Robertson (Minister of Labour); Charles F. Gray (Mayor of Winnipeg); A. J. Andrews

Casualties
- Deaths: 2
- Injuries: 30
- Arrested: 94

The Winnipeg General Strike of 1919 was one of the most dramatic and influential strikes in Canadian history. For six weeks, May 15 to June 26, more than 30,000 strikers brought economic activity to a standstill in Winnipeg, Manitoba, which at the time was Canada's third largest city.

In the short term, the strike ended in arrests and bloodshed. Over time it contributed to the development of a stronger labour movement and the tradition of social democratic politics in Canada. Winnipeg itself would see decline over the remainder of the twentieth century as both the east and west coasts had less need of its transport networks.

== Causes of the strike ==
Newsreel footage of the Winnipeg general strike of 1919

There were many background causes for the strike, most of them related to the prevailing social inequalities and the impoverished condition of the city's working class. The economic instability following the First World War increased frustration among workers across Canada. Wages were low, prices were rising, employment was unstable, immigrants faced discrimination, housing and health conditions were poor. Many workers believed that their wages had not kept pace with the rapidly rising cost of living. Labour unions played an important role in organizing workers and advocating for collective bargaining rights. In addition, there was resentment of the enormous profits enjoyed by employers during the war. Soldiers returning from the war were determined to see improved social conditions and opportunities after their harrowing experiences overseas. These economic and social pressures created widespread dissatisfaction among workers in Winnipeg. As a result, support for organized labour movements continued to grow in the city. The strike reflected broader social tensions that were developing in industrial cities across North America during the early twentieth century. Many returning soldiers expected better economic opportunities after the war, which increased frustration when these expectations were not met. Most workers did not have union representation, but many were influenced by the hope of achieving greater economic security through unions.

Many workers were also influenced by socialist ideas voiced by local reformers, radicals and revolutionaries. These attracted greater interest, especially among the large population of immigrants from Eastern Europe, after the Russian Revolution of 1917. A meeting of western labour delegates in Calgary in March 1919 adopted numerous radical resolutions, including support for a five-day week and a six-hour day. They also called for the establishment of a new union centre, the One Big Union, to promote class solidarity by uniting workers from all trades and industries in one organization. The idea that the OBU instigated the general strike is misleading, as the OBU was not formed until June 1919. However, the "one big union" idea contributed to the atmosphere of unrest. Similar volatile conditions existed elsewhere in Canada, and in other countries around the world, at the end of World War I, but the combination of circumstances in Winnipeg proved to be explosive.

The most immediate cause of the strike involved support for collective bargaining in the metal trades and building trades, where workers were attempting to negotiate contracts through their trades councils. When the Metal Trades Council and the Building Trades Council had both failed to secure contracts with employers by the end of April, they went on strike, the building trades on May 1 and the metal trades on May 2. Shortly afterwards, the situation was discussed at meetings of the Winnipeg Trades and Labour Council, the umbrella body for the city's unions. The Labour Council decided to call on their 12,000 affiliated members to vote on a proposal for a general strike. On a smaller scale, this tactic had achieved success for striking city workers a year earlier in 1918. Preliminary results of the vote among the Labour Council's member unions were announced on May 13. The outcome showed overwhelming support for a general strike, 8,667 to 645. Ernest Robinson, secretary of the Labour Council, issued a statement that "every organization but one has voted in favour of the general strike" and that "all public utilities will be tied-up in order to enforce the principle of collective bargaining". A Strike Committee was established, with delegates elected by the city's unions. The leadership included both moderate trade unionists, such as James Winning, a bricklayer who was president of the Trades and Labour Council, and socialists such as R. B. Russell, a machinist who favoured the OBU.

== 1919 general strike ==
=== Organization ===
At 11 am on Thursday, May 15, 1919, virtually the entire working population of Winnipeg went on strike. Around 30,000 workers in the public and private sectors walked off their jobs, and the city experienced a sudden cessation of many activities. The Strike Committee requested the police force, who had voted in favour of the strike, to remain on duty. Workers at the city waterworks also remained on the job to provide service at reduced pressure. Union membership had increased substantially during the spring of 1919, but most of the people who came out in support of the general strike were not union members. For instance, the first to leave work, at 7:00 a.m., were the telephone operators, the "hello girls" at the city telephone exchanges, who were not at this time union members. Also on the first day of the strike, the major organizations of returned soldiers announced their support and were active throughout the six weeks of the strike.

In the early days of the strike, according to historian David Bercuson, "The atmosphere was almost festive, the belief in ultimate victory strong." Participants assembled in city parks to listen to speakers report on the progress of the strike and discuss the many related social reform issues of the time. To ensure that strikers were kept informed of developments, the Strike Committee also published a daily Strike Bulletin. This newspaper urged the strikers to remain peaceable: "The only thing the workers have to do to win this strike is to do nothing. Just eat, sleep, play, love, laugh, and look at the sun ... Our fight consists of doing no fighting."

Women leaders played an important part in the strike. Women activists helped organize support networks and encouraged solidarity among striking workers. They encouraged female workers to go on strike, encouraged strikers in their strike efforts and built solidarity among strikers. Helen "Ma" Armstrong was one of two women on the Strike Committee. She encouraged young working women to join the strike and often spoke on street corners and at public meetings and was arrested multiple times. The Women's Labour League raised money to help women workers pay rent. Women also set up a kitchen where hundreds of meals were served every day. On June 12 a "ladies day" was held at Victoria Park, where women occupied seats of honour to hear a speech by J.S. Woodsworth promoting the emancipation of women and need for equality of the genders.

Negotiations between members of the Strike Committee, Winnipeg City Council and local businesses produced an arrangement to continue milk and bread deliveries. To make it clear that the delivery men were not strikebreakers, a small poster was printed for display on their wagons reading "PERMITTED BY AUTHORITY OF STRIKE COMMITTEE." Although management had suggested the cards, some said they showed the Strike Committee was trying to take control of the city.

=== Opposition ===
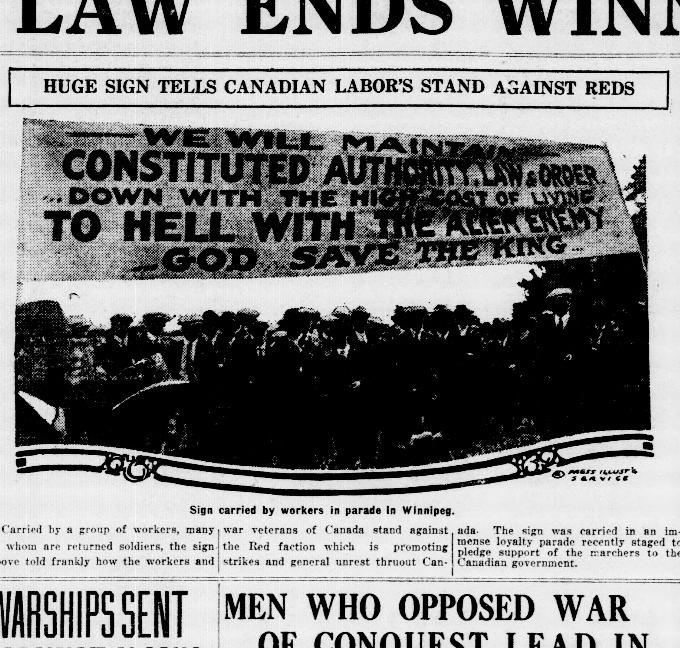
Anti-strike banner used in loyalist veterans parade during the 1919 Winnipeg general strike

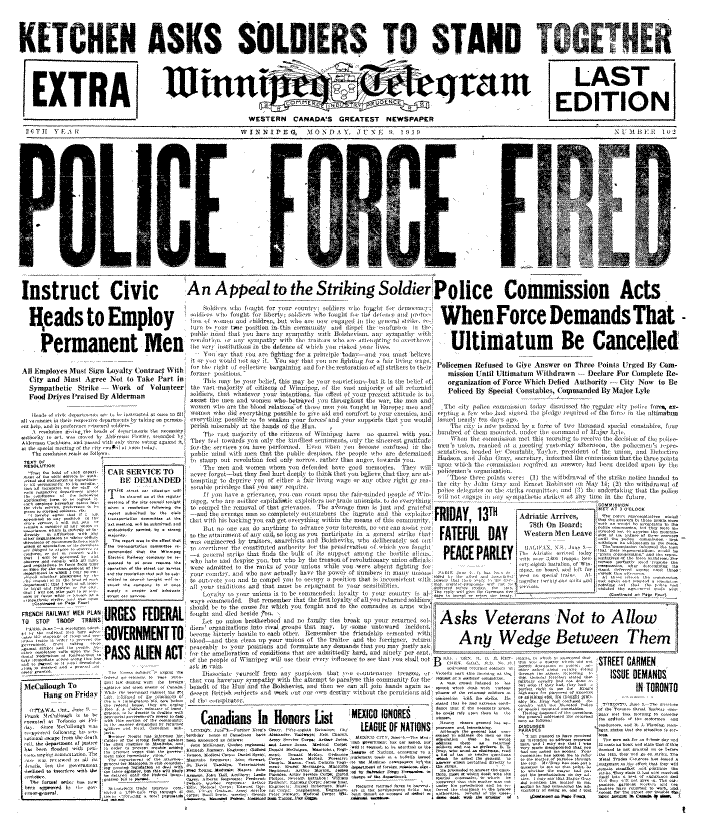
Winnipeg Telegram Front Cover June 9, 1919

Opposition to the strike was led by a group of local businessmen and professionals who described themselves as the Citizens' Committee of One Thousand. From their headquarters in the Board of Trade building, they encouraged employers not to give in to the strikers and attempted to stir up resentment of "alien" immigrants, who, they charged, were the principal leaders of the strike. They also put pressure on governments to take action against the strike. They published a newspaper, The Winnipeg Citizen, that claimed that "the so-called general strike is in reality revolution – or a daring attempt to overthrow the present industrial and governmental system."

At the end of the first week of the strike, two federal cabinet ministers arrived in Winnipeg to assess the situation, acting Minister of Justice Arthur Meighen and Minister of Labour Gideon Robertson. They refused to meet with the Strike Committee, but consulted with the Citizens' Committee, who greatly influenced their conclusions. Meighen issued a statement that the strike was "a cloak for something far deeper—an effort to 'overturn' the proper authority". Robertson reported back to Ottawa that "the motive behind this strike undoubtedly was the overthrow of Constitutional Government." They warned striking postal workers, who were federal employees, to return to work or lose their jobs. At this time, they also authorized the local government to use the armed forces and the Royal Northwest Mounted Police as needed. In preparation for arrests, at the beginning of June, and on the advice of one of the leaders of the Citizens' Committee, A.J. Andrews, the federal government amended the Immigration Act to allow for the deportation without trial of any British citizens not born in Canada who were charged with seditious activity.

The municipal government also took action. As large numbers of veterans were holding marches in the streets in support of the strike, on June 5 Mayor Charles F. Gray announced a ban on public demonstrations. On June 9 the city also dismissed almost the entire police force for refusing to sign a pledge promising to neither belong to a union nor participate in a sympathetic strike. With the assistance of the Citizens' Committee, the city police were replaced with a large body of untrained but better paid special constables who patrolled the streets with clubs. Within hours, one of the special constables, World War I Victoria-Cross-recipient Frederick Coppins, charged his horse into a group of strikers and was dragged off his horse and severely beaten. This led to claims that he was attacked by "enemy ruffians".

The local newspapers, the Winnipeg Free Press and Winnipeg Tribune, had lost the majority of their employees due to the strike, but once they were able to resume publication, they took a decidedly anti-strike stance. The Winnipeg Free Press called the strikers "bohunks", "aliens", and "anarchists" and ran cartoons depicting radicals throwing bombs. These anti-strike views influenced the opinions of some Winnipeg residents and contributed to the deepening atmosphere of crisis.

A plan to offer a modified form of collective bargaining to the Metal Trades Council was in the works at the middle of the month, but any efforts at compromise were ended by a series of arrests on charges of seditious conspiracy. In the early morning hours of June 17, the RNWMP apprehended several prominent leaders of the strike, including George Armstrong, Roger Bray, Abraham Heaps, William Ivens, R.B. Russell and city councillor John Queen. In addition, union organizer Bill Pritchard was arrested in Calgary on his way home from Winnipeg to Vancouver. R. J. Johns, of Winnipeg, was in Montreal and not arrested at this time. With the exception of Armstrong, who was Canadian-born, they were all British immigrants.

Several other foreign-born socialists, including Sam Blumenberg, Max Charitonoff and Solomon Almazoff were also arrested.Oscar Schoppelrei (sometimes spelled Schappellri), an American-born Canadian resident and WWI veteran of German ethnic origin, was also arrested.

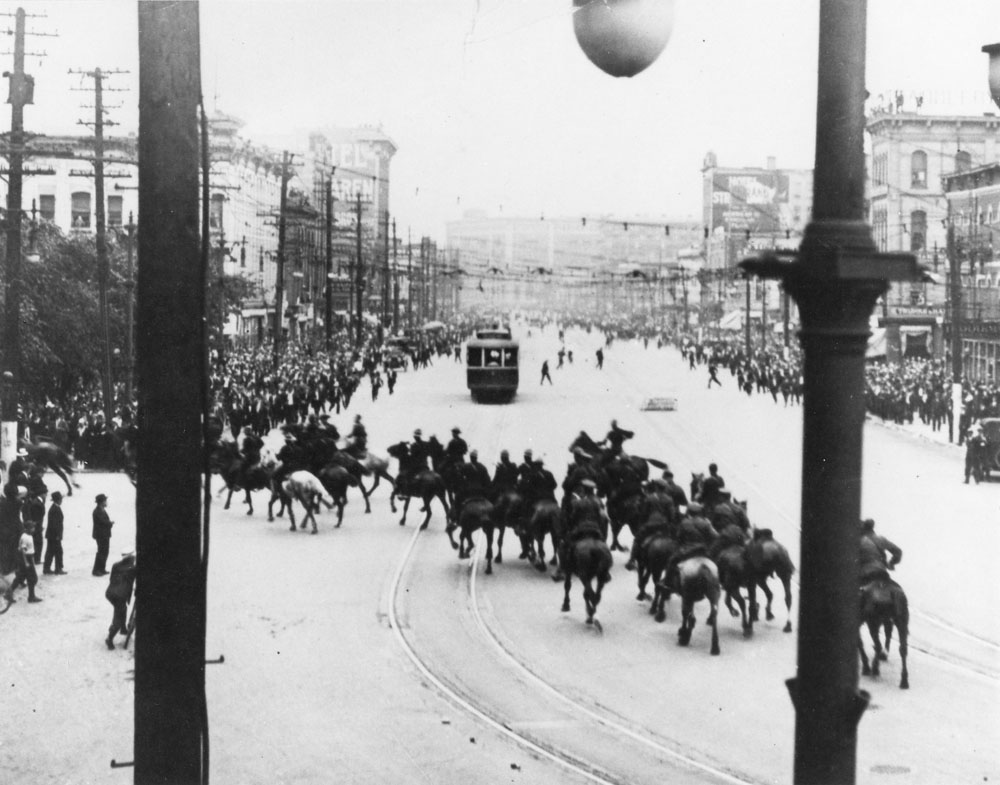
RNWMP action in Winnipeg during the strike

=== Bloody Saturday ===
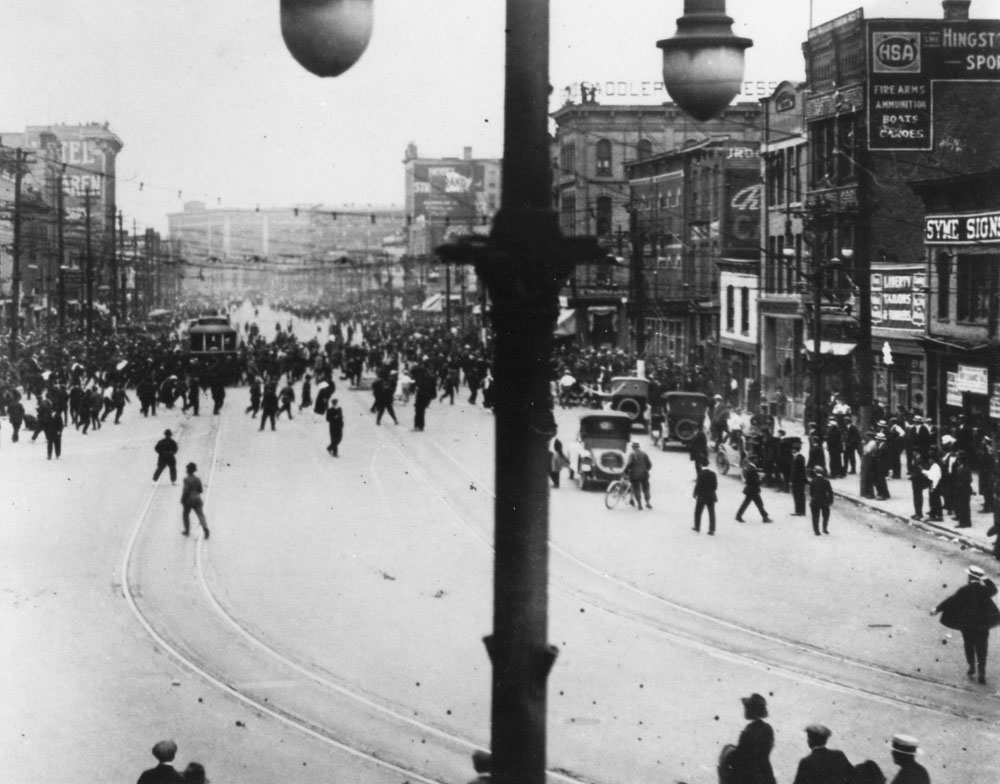
Winnipeg general strike turns into a riot.

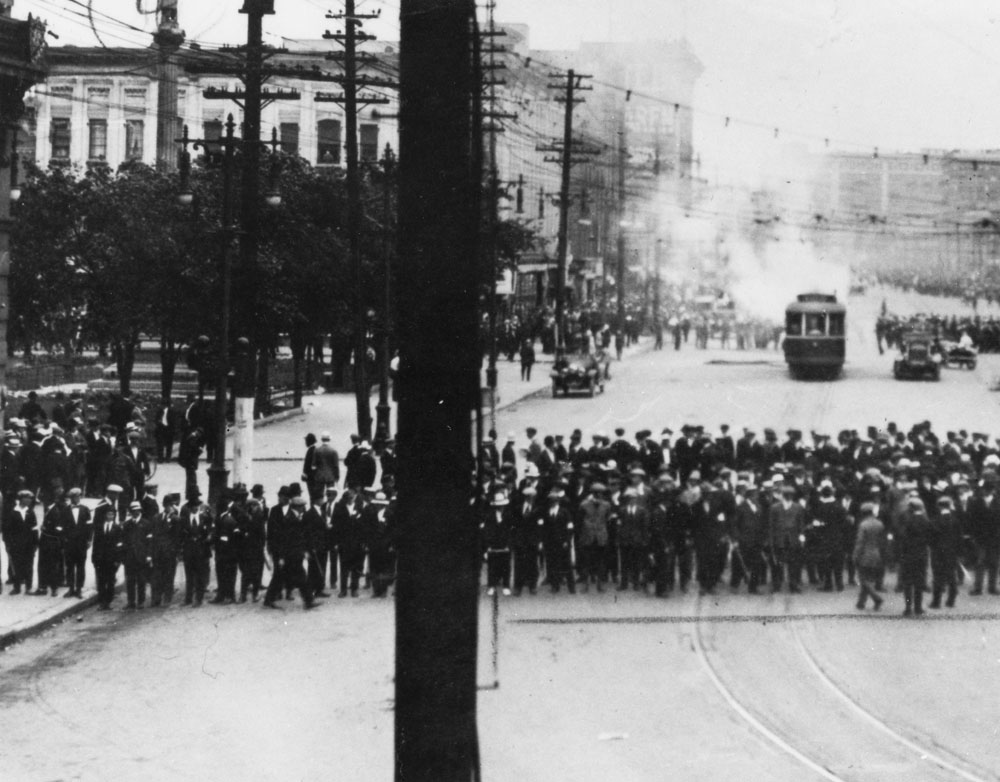
Crowds on the street

The climax of the strike came a few days later, on Saturday, June 21, which was soon known as Bloody Saturday. To protest against the arrest of the strike leaders, the returned soldiers had announced a demonstration in the form of a "silent parade" on Main Street for Saturday afternoon. Crowds assembled in the thousands in the streets around City Hall. When the soldiers refused to call off the demonstration, Mayor Gray requested assistance from the RNWMP, who entered into the crowds on horseback, wielding clubs in an attempt to disperse the assembly. A streetcar operated by a strikebreaker attempted to travel south on Main Street towards Portage Avenue but was stopped and tipped off the tracks and briefly set on fire.

After the Mayor read the Riot Act, the Mounties entered the fray again, this time discharging their .45 revolvers in three separate volleys. About 120 shots were fired. One man, Mike Sokolowski, was killed on the spot. Another, Steve Szczerbanowicz, died later from his wounds. Hospitals reported about 30 injuries, mainly from police gunfire. Friends and family tended others with injuries. The crowds were chased into side streets and broken up. The "specials" arrested some 80 people, and military patrols took over the downtown area.

When the Strike Bulletin published its account of Bloody Saturday, police arrested its editor, Fred J. Dixon. J.S. Woodsworth replaced him and was soon arrested and charged with seditious libel. Police stopped further publication of the newspaper. The offending articles were headed with titles such as "Kaiserism in Canada" and "The British Way". The charges against Woodsworth included his quotation of a verse from the Bible, "Woe unto them that decree unrighteous decrees." .

These events broke the confidence of the Strike Committee. On June 25, they announced the end of the strike for 11:00 a.m. the next day. After six weeks, the strikers drifted back to their jobs. Many were blacklisted or otherwise punished for participating in the strike.

=== Role in the labour revolt ===
In May and June 1919, general strikes broke out in as many as thirty other cities, from Amherst, Nova Scotia, to Victoria, British Columbia. Some of these strikes were protests against local conditions; some were in solidarity with the Winnipeg strikers; some arose from both causes.

== Aftermath ==
=== "State trials" and deportations ===
Eight of the strike leaders were brought to trial for seditious conspiracy - Heaps, Armstrong, Bray, Ivens, Johns, Pritchard, Russell and Queen. The evidence against them focused less on their actions than on their socialist ideas, which were seen as the root cause of the unrest that led to the general strike. Under arrangements accepted (and paid for) by the federal government, Andrews and other "legal gentlemen" who were active in the Citizens' Committee during the strike conducted the prosecution.

The largely rural juries selected for the trials found guilty seven of the accused (Armstrong, Bray, Ivens, Johns, Pritchard, Russell and Queen). Most were sentenced to one year imprisonment. Russell was sentenced to two years. Bray was convicted on a lesser charge and was sentenced to six months. John Farnell, who had replaced Bray after his arrest as leader of pro-strike returned soldiers, was sentenced to nine months in prison. He was released three months early, due to his wife's illness. Heaps conducted his own defence and a jury acquitted him on all charges. Dixon, who was charged with seditious libel, delivered a strong defence of the right to free speech as an essential element of the British tradition. After forty hours of deliberation, the largely urban jury acquitted him. This result caused the prosecution to abandon the prosecution against Woodsworth.

J. B. McLachlan, a prominent labour organizer in Cape Breton, observed the clampdown in Winnipeg and protested the Immigration Act amendments brought in to allow the summary deportation of all British- and foreign-born immigrants accused of sedition. In the case of the "foreigners" arrested on June 17, there were no criminal proceedings. The attempt to deport Almazoff failed, and Charitonoff appealed successfully against a deportation order. Blumenberg and Schoppelrei were deported on technical grounds related to their original entry into the country. Blumenberg went to the U.S., organizing workers in the Duluth area and running for municipal office there on the socialist platform.

During the trial, a large protest demonstration was held on September 2 in which 7000 attended. At that time, J.B. McLachlan called for a general strike to demand the renewal of bail for the arrested strike leaders. On 1 May 1920 he organized a one-day “holiday” to protest against the convictions.

=== Political impact ===
A provincial royal commission headed by H.A. Robson investigated the strike. The report deplored sympathetic strikes but concluded that the Winnipeg strike was not a criminal conspiracy by foreigners and stated that "if Capital does not provide enough to assure Labour a contented existence ... then the Government might find it necessary to step in and let the state do these things at the expense of Capital."

The impact of the strike was evident in subsequent elections. Labour had elected some representatives prior to the strike but the number significantly increased afterwards at all three levels of government. Partly this was due to the adoption of proportional representation (STV) to elect Winnipeg city councillors and MLAs.

While awaiting trial, Queen was re-elected to the Winnipeg City council. While serving out their sentences in prison, Armstrong, Ivens and Queen were elected to the Manitoba legislature in the 1920 provincial election. Queen later served seven terms as mayor of Winnipeg. Seymour Farmer had supported the strike and later served as MLA 1922–1949.

However, for a period of 25 years after the general strike, the business-supported Citizens League never lost dominance in city hall. And the polarity of the general strike was transmuted to city politics for that entire period, at least on the issues of social welfare and working conditions. In part to calm the waters, Winnipeg adopted single transferable voting to elects its city councillors, and at the same time STV was adopted for election of Winnipeg MLAs as well.

Woodsworth was elected as a Labour Member of Parliament for the Winnipeg Centre riding in 1921 and was repeatedly re-elected to the House of Commons until his death in 1942. In 1932 he helped found and became leader of the Co-operative Commonwealth Federation, a forerunner of the New Democratic Party. That party was elected to provincial government in Saskatchewan in 1944, governing from 1944 to 1961 and as the NDP, in Manitoba 1969–77 and in BC 1972–1975. Heaps was elected as the Labour Member of Parliament for Winnipeg North in 1925 and re-elected until 1940.

=== Impact on unions ===
Organized labour built on the legacy of the strike to strengthen the union movement and to pursue formal collective bargaining rights. The One Big Union flourished briefly, achieving its greatest popularity in 1920. This was followed by the rise of new industrial unions in the 1930s. The renewed poverty and insecurity of the Great Depression led to a long period of labour militancy across Canada in the 1940s, when union membership increased substantially. By the end of that decade, a formal industrial relations regime was established in Canadian law that provided some security for unions and their members but also threatened to limit the scope of their activity. Historians often consider the Winnipeg General Strike an important turning point in the development of labour rights in Canada.

== Historiography ==
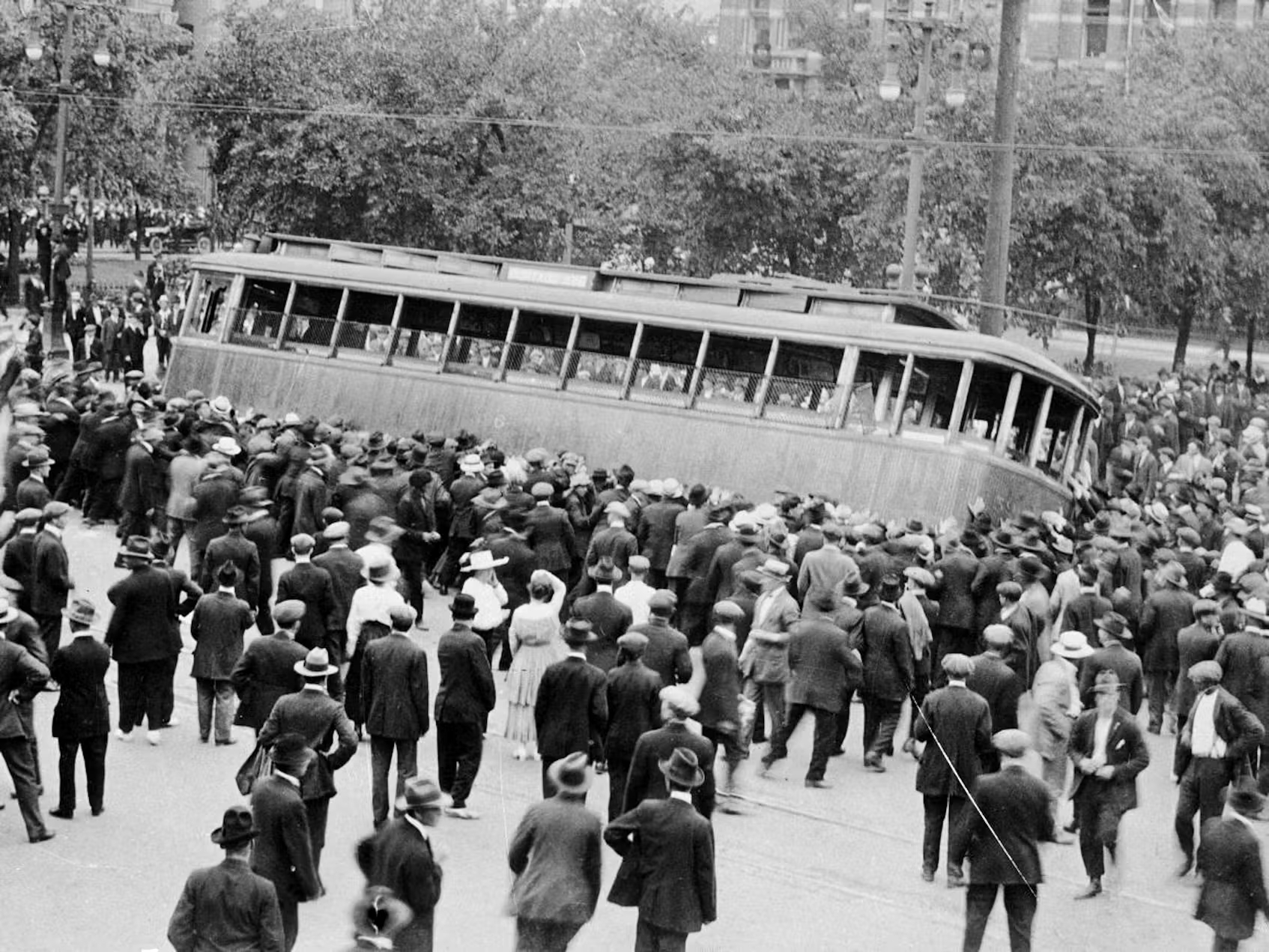
Partially overturned streetcar during the strike

Discussion of the Winnipeg General Strike often begins with whether it was a conspiracy to overthrow the government or a fight for union recognition and a living wage. Given the scale of the strike and its political impact, it was difficult to consider it only an ordinary collective bargaining dispute. This led some historians to study local labour relations in detail, while others examined the nature of labour reform and radical activism in western Canada. Churches, immigrants, women, soldiers, and municipal politics have also been the subject of study. The "red scare" promoted by business and government spokesmen attracted attention, as did the legal manoeuvres that led to the arrest and conviction of prominent strike supporters on charges of sedition.

While some historians regarded the strike as a western labour revolt rooted in unique conditions in western Canada, others have pointed to widespread labour unrest across Canada, both in 1919 itself and also during the years from 1917 to 1925. Recent accounts of the strike have also noted that most strikers were not union members, suggesting that the events might be described as an urban rebellion against the failings of the capitalist social order as it existed at the end of World War I.

== Commemorations in popular culture ==
Shortly after the strike, two novels, Ralph Connor's To Him that Hath (Toronto, 1921) and Douglas Durkin's The Magpie (Toronto, 1923), explored some of the labour and social themes raised by the strike. Fox, a 1991 novel by author Margaret Sweatman, is a work of historical fiction about the events leading up to and following the strike. In 2019, Fernwood Publishing released Papergirl, a young adult novel by Melinda McCracken about a girl who distributes the strikers' newspaper. In the same year, 1919 A Graphic History of the Winnipeg General Strike was published by the Graphic History Collective.

Among remembrances of this event in Canadian popular culture are the songs "In Winnipeg" by musician Mike Ford, included in the album Canada Needs You Volume Two, and "Winnipeg 1919" by songwriter Joe Jencks. In 2005, Danny Schur created a musical called Strike! based on the event. A film version called Stand! premiered on September 10, 2019 and received favourable reviews. Many of the famous photographs of the strike were by Winnipeg photographer L. B. Foote. In Winnipeg, there are several memorials and monuments commemorating the strike.

== See also ==
- List of incidents of civil unrest in Canada
- 1918 Vancouver general strike
- 1919 Seattle General Strike
- 1935 On-to-Ottawa Trek
