= Vancouver riot =

Vancouver riot may refer to any of several riots in Vancouver, British Columbia, Canada, including:

- 1886 Vancouver anti-Chinese riots
- 1907 Vancouver anti-Asian riots, anti-immigration riots
- 1918 Vancouver general strike
- Battle of Ballantyne Pier, a 1935 riot during a dockers' strike
- Bloody Sunday (1938), the conclusion of a sit-down strike by unemployed men
- 1966 Vancouver Grey Cup riot
- Gastown riots, 1971 riots following a police attack on a peaceful smoke-in protest
- 1994 Vancouver Stanley Cup riot, following the Vancouver Canucks' loss to the New York Rangers
- 2011 Vancouver Stanley Cup riot, following the Vancouver Canucks' loss to the Boston Bruins
