= Toronto riot =

Toronto riot may refer to:

- 1855 Toronto Circus Riot
- 1875 Jubilee riots
- 1918 Toronto anti-Greek riot
- 1933 Christie Pits riot
- 1981 Operation Soap
- 1992 Yonge Street riot
- 2010 G20 Toronto summit protests
- Riot Fest, a music festival held in Toronto, 2013–2015
