= 1966 Vancouver Grey Cup riot =

1966 riot in downtown Vancouver, Canada, following a Canadian Football game

- Date: November 25, 1966
- Location: Downtown Vancouver
- Deaths: 0
- Injuries: 37
- Charges: 436

The 1966 Vancouver Grey Cup riot was a riot following the Grey Cup parade before the 54th Grey Cup on the evening of Friday November 25, 1966 in Vancouver, British Columbia, Canada. It led to over 400 arrests.

== See also ==
- List of incidents of civil unrest in Canada
- 1994 Vancouver Stanley Cup riot
- 2011 Vancouver Stanley Cup riot
