= 411 Seniors Centre =

Coordinates: 49.282°N 123.1135°W

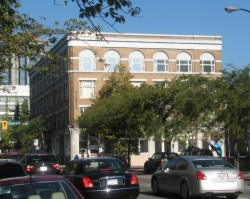
The Old Building: 411 Seniors at 411 Dunsmuir St.

The 411 Seniors Centre is a registered society, located at 3502 Fraser St Vancouver, British Columbia. It specializes in programs for moderate to low income seniors in the Vancouver area.

== History ==
In 2012, 411 Seniors Centre relocated to Terminal Avenue in Vancouver. The 411 Seniors Centre Society owned and operated the 4 storey tall building at Dunsmuir and Homer Streets from 2006 to 2012. The Vancouver Trades and Labour Council erected this building in 1910 from union members' contributions. The building has had a long list of occupants and the provincial government took over its ownership in 1921.

411 Seniors itself began in 1947 when seniors programs occupied the first two floors, and the society itself was constituted in 1972.

411 Seniors is best known for its income tax and information referral advocacy programs and services. It has been known for initiating and actively supporting multicultural and LGBT programming for older adults in the Lower Mainland. It offers recreational leisure opportunities for seniors.

== See also ==
- 1918 Vancouver general strike - events that included this building when it was a Labour Temple
- List of heritage buildings in Vancouver
- List of old Canadian buildings
