= Smoke-in =

Protest in favor of cannabis rights

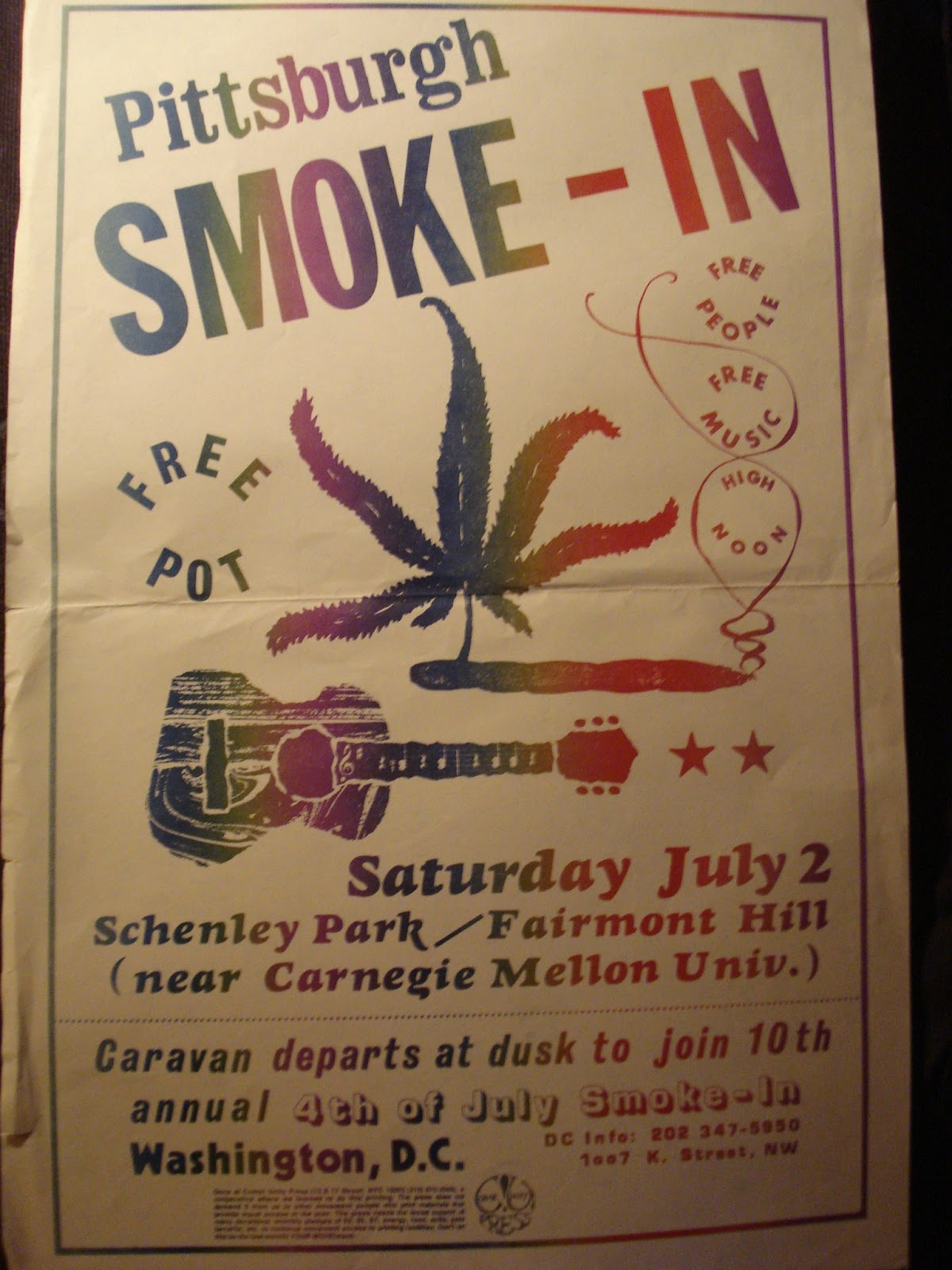
Poster advertising Yippie-sponsored Pittsburgh Smoke-In, Schenley Park, July 2, 1977

A smoke-in is a demonstration advocating the rights of cannabis consumers and a protest for the legalization of cannabis.

The Youth International Party (YIP) organized "smoke-ins" across North America through the 1970s and into the 1980s. The first YIP smoke-in was attended by 25,000 in Washington, D.C., on July 4, 1970. There was a culture clash when many of the hippie protesters strolled en masse into the nearby "Honor America Day" festivities with Billy Graham and Bob Hope.

On August 7, 1971, a Yippie smoke-in in Vancouver was attacked by police, resulting in the Gastown Riot, one of the most famous protests in Canadian history.

The annual July 4 Yippie smoke-in in Washington, D.C., became a counterculture tradition. Other smoke-ins as protests for cannabis law reform have been held in the 1960s in London; and through the 1990s at least at the U.S. Capitol, and in and around Austin, Texas.

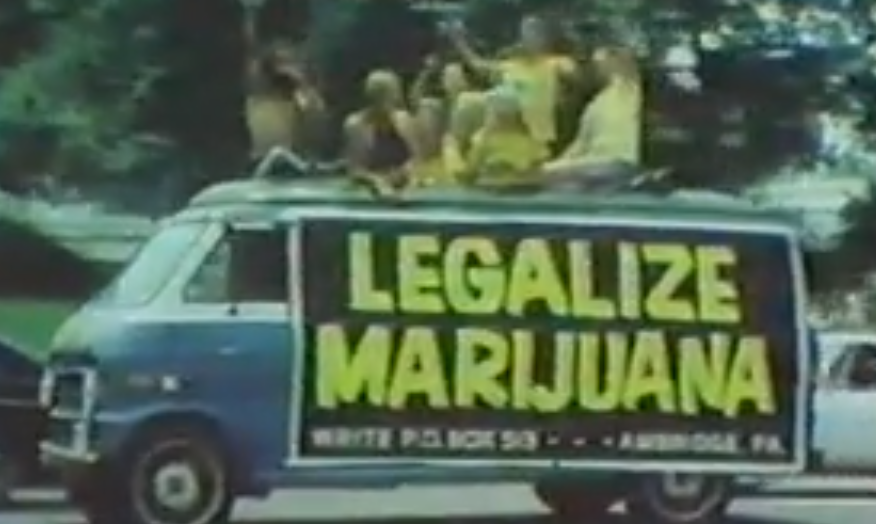
Yippie van makes a few passes by the July 4th Smoke-In, Lafayette Park, Washington, D.C., 1977.

== See also ==
- 420 (cannabis culture)
