= List of incidents of civil unrest in Canada =

This is a list of major incidents of civil disorder that have occurred in Canada. This list includes events that occurred prior to Canadian Confederation in 1867, as well as events that occurred in territories that were not part of Canada at the time that they occurred, such as the Newfoundland Colony and later Dominion of Newfoundland.

== 18th century ==
Year	Incident	Location
1753	Lunenburg Rebellion	Lunenburg, Nova Scotia
1784	Shelburne riots	Shelburne, Nova Scotia

== 19th century ==
Year(s)	Incident	Location
1826	Types Riot	York, Upper Canada
1835–1845	Shiners' War	Bytown, Upper Canada
1837	Upper Canada Rebellion	Upper Canada
1837–1838	Lower Canada Rebellion	Lower Canada
1837–1838	Rebellions of 1837–1838	Lower Canada and Upper Canada
1838	Patriot War	Canada–United States border
1842–1844	Welland Canal Riot	Welland Canal area, Upper Canada
1847	1847 Woodstock riot	Woodstock, New Brunswick
1849	Burning of the Parliament Buildings in Montreal	Montreal, Lower Canada
1849	Stony Monday Riot	Bytown, Upper Canada
1853	Gavazzi Riots	Montreal and Quebec City, Lower Canada
1855	Toronto circus riot	Toronto, Canada West
1861	1861 Newfoundland general election rioting	Harbour Grace, Newfoundland
1863	Oil Springs riot	Sarnia, Upper Canada
1869–1870	Red River Rebellion	Red River Colony
1875	Louis Mailloux Affair	Caraquet, New Brunswick
1875	Jubilee riots	Toronto, Ontario
1875	Montreal anti-vaccination riot	Montreal, Quebec
1883	The Harbour Grace Affray	Harbour Grace, Newfoundland Colony
1885	North-West Rebellion	Present-day Alberta and Saskatchewan
1885	Montreal anti-vaccine riot	Montreal, Quebec

== 20th century ==
Year(s)	Incident	Location
1903	1903 Consolidated Lake Superior riot	Sault Ste. Marie, Ontario
1907	Pacific Coast race riots of 1907	Vancouver, British Columbia
1914	1914 Saint John street railway strike	Saint John, New Brunswick
1916	Battle of the Hatpins	Ottawa, Ontario
1917	Conscription Crisis of 1917	Quebec
1918	1918 Toronto anti-Greek riot	Toronto, Ontario
1918	1918 Vancouver general strike	Vancouver, British Columbia
1918–1925	Canadian Labour Revolt	nationwide
1919	Winnipeg general strike	Winnipeg, Manitoba
1931	Estevan riot	Estevan, Saskatchewan
1932	1932 Colonial Building riot (Note: Newfoundland was not yet part of Canada and instead was a separate Dominion of the British Empire)	St. John's, Dominion of Newfoundland
1932	Edmonton Hunger March. A march by 10,000 workers and farmers dispersed by club-wielding mounted policemen.	Edmonton, Alberta
1933	Christie Pits riot	Toronto, Ontario
1934	Days of Shame	Montreal, Quebec
1934	Battle at Old Market Square	Winnipeg, Manitoba
1935	Battle of Ballantyne Pier	Vancouver, British Columbia
1935	Regina Riot, culmination of the On-to-Ottawa Trek	Regina, Saskatchewan
1938	Bloody Sunday	Vancouver, British Columbia
1942	Battle of Bowmanville by German POWs	Bowmanville POW camp, Ontario
1944	Terrace mutiny by soldiers unwilling to go overseas	Terrace, British Columbia
1945	Halifax riot by sailors and soldiers on VE-Day.	Dartmouth and Halifax, Nova Scotia
1949	Asbestos strike	Asbestos, Quebec
1955	Richard Riot	Montreal, Quebec
1958	Newfoundland Loggers' Strike	Newfoundland
1966	1966 Vancouver Grey Cup riot	Vancouver, British Columbia
1969	Sir George Williams affair	Montreal, Quebec
1969	Murray-Hill riot	Montreal, Quebec
1970	October Crisis	Greater Montreal, Quebec
1971	1971 Kingston Penitentiary riot	Kingston, Ontario
1971	Gastown riots	Vancouver, British Columbia
1981	Cape Breton coal strike of 1981	Cape Breton Island, Nova Scotia
1987	Edmonton Celebration of Stanley Cup win. Celebration on Jasper Avenue turned into a riot. Dozens arrested.	Edmonton, Alberta
1987	On December 10, Toronto Libraries staged a one-day suspension of service against Bill C-54 (anti-pornography legislation)	Toronto
1988–1989	Temagami Blockade of 1988–1989 (concerning the Temagami Land Caution). Blockades were a chapter in 103-year-long fight for local First Nation control of Lake Temagami area, which ended partially successfully in 1995.	Temagami, Ontario
1989–1990	Mohawk Civil War	Akwesasne, Ontario and Quebec
1990	Oka Crisis	Oka, Kahnawake, Kanesatake, Quebec
1992	Yonge Street riot	Toronto, Ontario
1994	1994 Vancouver Stanley Cup riot	Vancouver, British Columbia

== 21st century ==
Year	Incident	Location
2001	Edmonton Canada Day riot. Crowds broke shop windows, threw rocks at police officers, overturned mail boxes and park benches, and kicked in phone booths.	Edmonton, Alberta
2002	Concordia University Netanyahu riot	Montreal, Quebec
2006	Edmonton Stanley Cup Playoff run. Perhaps as many as 50,000 youths gathered on Whyte Avenue on different nights. Mischief, vandalism, open fires on the street, nudity.	Edmonton, Alberta
2006	2006 Grand Manan riot	Grand Manan, New Brunswick
2010	2010 G20 Toronto summit protests	Toronto, Ontario
2011	2011 Vancouver Stanley Cup riot	Vancouver, British Columbia
2012	2012 Quebec student protests	Quebec
2014	HMP chapel riot	St. John's, Newfoundland and Labrador
2020	2020 Canadian pipeline and railway protests	Wetʼsuwetʼen First Nation territory, BC
2022	Canada convoy protest	nationwide

== See also ==
- Emergencies Act
- List of conflicts in North America
- List of excessive force police incidents in Canada
- List of riots
- List of strikes in Canada
