= Oil Springs riot =

1863 race riot in Ontario

Oil Springs Riot
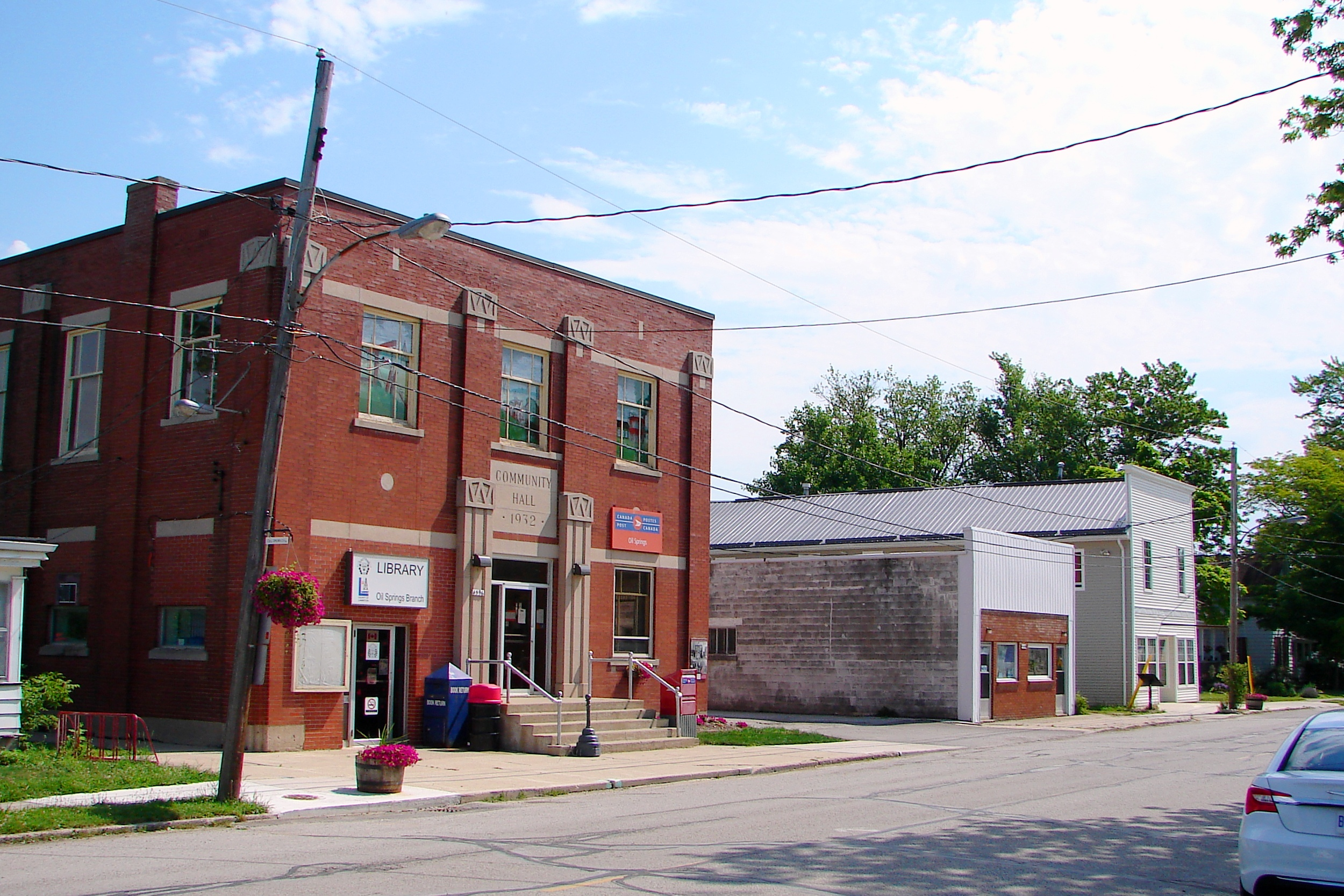
- Location in Oil Springs
- Date: Saturday March 14, 1863
- Location: What is now Centre St in Lambton County, Ontario; 42.776°N 82.116°W
- Injuries: Several reported injured
- Property damage: Homes and possessions of Black inhabitants
- Arrests: 9 arrested
- Convicted: John R. Lavins
- Sentence: 2 years in prison, forfeit of property

On March 14, 1863, a race riot broke out in Oil Springs, located on what is now known as Centre Street in Sarnia-Lambton County, Ontario. The race riot consisted of 80-100 white Americans coming together and burning down the homes of black Canadians on what is now Centre Street, causing them to flee to safety in the woods The reason behind the race riot was in large part due to white labourer's being outraged by black labourer's willingness to work for lower wages.

== Background ==
Sarnia-Lambton is the birthplace of Canada's Petrochemical Industry and is the site of North America's first commercial oil well after the discovery of oil in Oil Springs in 1857. The oil boom of Oil Springs was in full swing and wells popped up across Enniskillen. Oil speculators were getting rich. Drilling wells, harvesting oil and transporting it took much time, muscle and resources.

Black persons were not the only ones to immigrate to the area. Oil Springs had also become home to Irish, Scottish, English, and American immigrants. As one might expect, residents of Oil Springs mostly worked in the oil industry. Some were investors, speculators or related industry business owners, but most were labourers.

Canada historically has compared itself as a safe haven for freedom seekers trying to flee from slavery in the United States. A strong sense of negrophobia existed all throughout Canada leading to a variety of discriminatory practices by White people. it also led to the displacement of blacks from black settlements across the country, in such places like Africville, Priceville, and Queen's Bush.

=== Tensions Rising Prior to Oil Springs Riot ===
A few weeks before the riot, the Lambton County Archives make note of the Detroit riot taking place in response to the emancipation of slavery that went into effect a couple months prior in January. The climax was reached when one of the dusky laborers shoved Mrs. Justin Bradley, the wife of the proprietor of the Royal George, a well-known east-end boarding house, off the sidewalk.”

== Abolition of Slavery in the U.S ==
In January of 1863, U.S. President Lincoln issued the Emancipation Proclamation. The Proclamation freed enslaved persons in the States, and threatened the power structures of white society. Riots occurred across the States in 1863 as tensions rose, and Canada was not immune. Just weeks before the riot at Oil Springs.

The emancipation of slavery in Canada birthed a community of white Americans that rejected the idea of the black community being on equal footing as whites and as a result left America for Canada. The chief actors in this riot, it is said, are the same group of white Americans, who actually forswore their allegiance as soldiers initially, and eventually left for Canada, because they did not believe in fighting to put the coloured race on a footing of equality.

== Aftermath ==
No black people remained in Oil Springs after the riot. It is also unclear where the black people ended up after fleeing. Papers in both Canada and the States condemned the rioters. The Sarnia Observer called the riot a “disgraceful incident” and the Montreal Commercial Advertiser called for the government to punish rioters. The Douglass Monthly, a black periodical in the States, published articles about the riot, as did the Detroit Free Press.

Several constables were quickly appointed to arrest "the more active of the rioters." By the following Monday nine men were in custody. But some escaped, leaving four to face a justice of the peace who ordered them held in jail in Sarnia. On the way there, another two "managed to slip off their handcuffs and to make good their escape,"

Of the four people that were captured for the riot, court records identify one of the parties involved. The riot of Oil Springs in 1863 did not escape the judicial system. One individual, John Lavins (or Lavius) from Lambton County was sent to jail for his crimes. Judge Charles Robinson at the Quarter Sessions of June 11, 1863, sentenced John R. Lavins for Felony and was received at Provincial Penitentiary of Upper Canada (today known as Kingston Penitentiary) on June 25, 1863. His term of sentence was 2 years, and he was discharged on June 10, 1865. His prison intake number is 5853, he was 37 years old and a widower from Ireland.

== See also ==
- List of incidents of civil unrest in Canada
