= Christie Pits riot =

1933 race riot in Canada

Christie Pits Riot
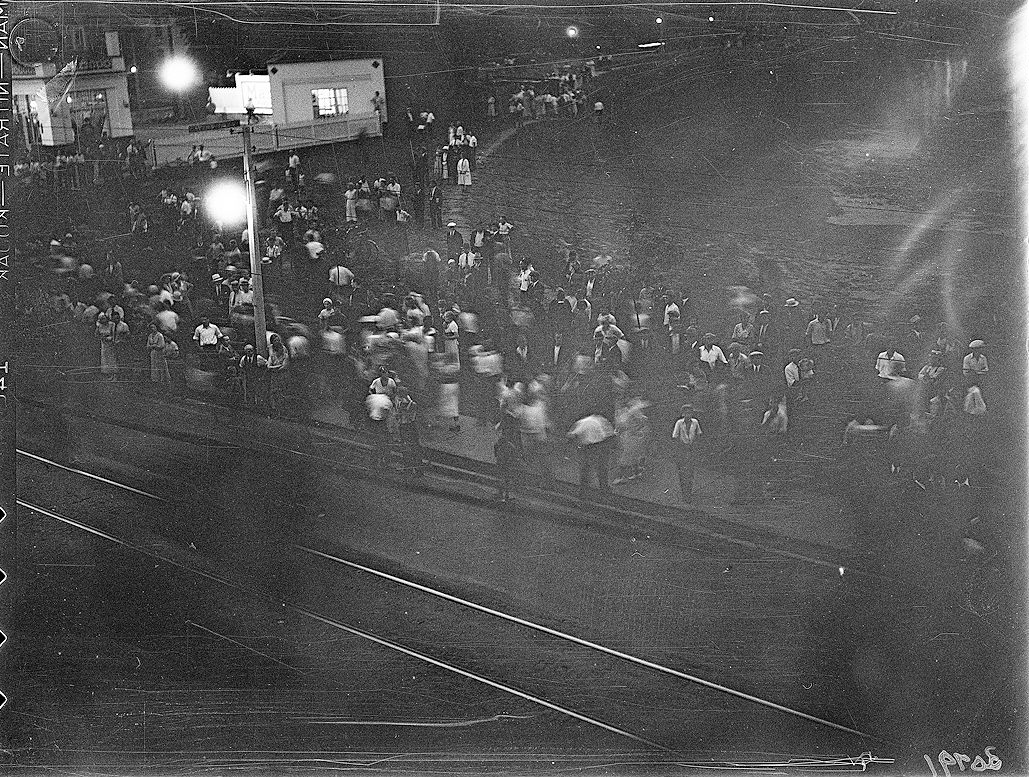
- The only known photograph of the Christie Pits riot with people shown
- Date: 16 August 1933
- Location: Christie Pits, Toronto, Ontario, Canada; 43°39′53″N 79°25′15″W
- Caused by: Displays of swastika banners; resentment of Jewish families in The Beaches

Parties
"Swastika Club" members and supporters	Local Jewish and Italian residents and supporters	Toronto police
- Location within Ontario

The Christie Pits riot occurred on 16 August 1933 at the Christie Pits (Willowvale Park) playground in Toronto, Ontario, Canada. The riot took place in the context of the Great Depression, antisemitism, "Swastika Clubs" and parades and resentment of "foreigners" in Toronto, and the rise of Adolf Hitler and the Nazis in Germany in 1933.

== Background ==
The riot occurred in the midst of the Great Depression and six months after Adolf Hitler took power in Germany. The Toronto papers, including the Toronto Telegram and the Toronto Daily Star, as well as the Yiddish journal, Der Yiddisher Zhurnal, reported on how Jews were being dismissed from professions in Germany, including lawyers, professors, and teachers, as well as incidents of violence against them. Thus to Jews, the swastika represented degradation and physical violence against Jews, and was inflammatory.

At that time, the Jewish community in Toronto was predominantly poor, working-class migrants. Jewish families and youths in particular would therefore cool off during the hot summer months by staying in town and going to the predominantly Anglo Beaches area to swim. This resulted in complaints and resentment from some local residents. Some of the locals formed a "Swastika Club", which openly displayed the Nazi symbol to express their displeasure and make Jews feel unwanted. On August 1, 1933, the Swastika Club became the subject of an editorial in Toronto's Jewish Standard, which prompted multiple protests from local Jewish residents. On August 2, mass protests of young Jewish Canadians occurred at The Beaches, that were met by counter-protests from the members of Swastika Club. The leaders of the Swastika Club initially insisted that the swastika had nothing to do with Hitler. They said they merely wanted to keep the Beach clean. This resulted in a tug of war between city officials and Jewish leaders, who tried to have the Swastika Club disband voluntarily, and the Swastika Club leadership, which pushed for legal action. By August 14, the situation reached a stalemate, with the leadership of Toronto Swastika Club participating in the Kitchener Swastika Club meeting, where an openly antisemitic agenda was pursued.

== The riot ==
The riot, which lasted six hours, broke out after a quarter-final baseball game at Christie Pits between two local clubs: Harbord Playground, consisting predominantly of Jewish and Italian players, and St. Peter's, a baseball team sponsored by St. Peter's Church, a Catholic church at Bathurst and Bloor.

The night of the riot was the second game between Harbord and St. Peter's. Two nights earlier, at the first game of the series, a swastika had been displayed. Police were warned in writing that there could be trouble at the second game, but those warnings were ignored. After the final out of the second game, Pit Gang members displayed a blanket with a large swastika painted on it. A number of Jewish boys and young men who had heard about the previous Swastika incident rushed the Swastika sign to destroy it, supporters of both sides (including Italians who supported the Jews) from the surrounding area joined in, and a fight started.

The Toronto Daily Star described the event the next day:

While groups of Jewish and Gentile youths wielded fists and clubs in a series of violent scraps for possession of a white flag bearing a swastika symbol at Willowvale Park last night, a crowd of more than 10,000 citizens, excited by cries of 'Heil Hitler' became suddenly a disorderly mob and surged wildly about the park and surrounding streets, trying to gain a view of the actual combatants, which soon developed in violence and intensity of racial feeling into one of the worst free-for-alls ever seen in the city. Scores were injured, many requiring medical and hospital attention ... Heads were opened, eyes blackened and bodies thumped and battered as literally dozens of persons, young or old, many of them non-combatant spectators, were injured more or less seriously by a variety of ugly weapons in the hands of wild-eyed and irresponsible young hoodlums, both Jewish and Gentile.

=== Aftermath ===
There was criticism of the police for not being ready to intervene, as they had been during previous potential problems in the Beach area. After the riot, Mayor Stewart warned against displaying the swastika and there were no further riots.

The riot revealed the xenophobic attitudes toward Jews and other non-Anglo immigrants (such as Italian immigrants) among some Anglo Canadians. Jews represented the largest minority in Toronto in 1933 and were thus a target of xenophobic residents. The event had some parallels to the 1875 Jubilee riots, an outbreak of Protestant–Catholic sectarian violence in Toronto and Anti-Greek Riots which previously occurred in the city in 1918.

== Legacy ==
Some sources have interpreted The Tragically Hip's 1999 single "Bobcaygeon" as alluding to the riots, as the song's lyrics contain the words "riot" and "Aryan". This has been disputed, as the song is set in a contemporary context rather than the 1930s, and the words do not appear in close conjunction; however, the same verse contains a reference to The Men They Couldn't Hang, who wrote "Ghosts of Cable Street", a song about the anti-fascist Battle of Cable Street riot in London in 1936. Their lyricism often combined separated historical events in the same song. “50 Mission Cap” has a similar historical twist.

In August 2008, a Heritage Toronto plaque was presented to commemorate the 75th anniversary of the riot.

The incident was depicted in two graphic novels, Christie Pits by Jamie Michaels and illustrated by Doug Fedrau in 2019 and The Good Fight by Ted Staunton and Josh Rosen (ill.) in 2021.

A Christie Pits documentary, directed by Sean Cisterna, was released in 2023 about the riot.

In November 2026, a group of Italian Canadian Business and Community leaders, including Steven Del Duca, Vaughan Mayor, and Frank Scarpitti, Mayor of Markham, Steve Pellegrini, Mayor of King, and Steven Lecce, Member of Provincial Parliament, released a statement condemning antisemitism and referencing the Christie Pits riot.

== See also ==
- List of incidents of civil unrest in Canada
- History of the Jews in Toronto
- Antisemitism in Canada
- Battle at Old Market Square
