= 1918 Vancouver general strike =

Worker protests in Vancouver, Canada

- Part of the Canadian Labour Revolt
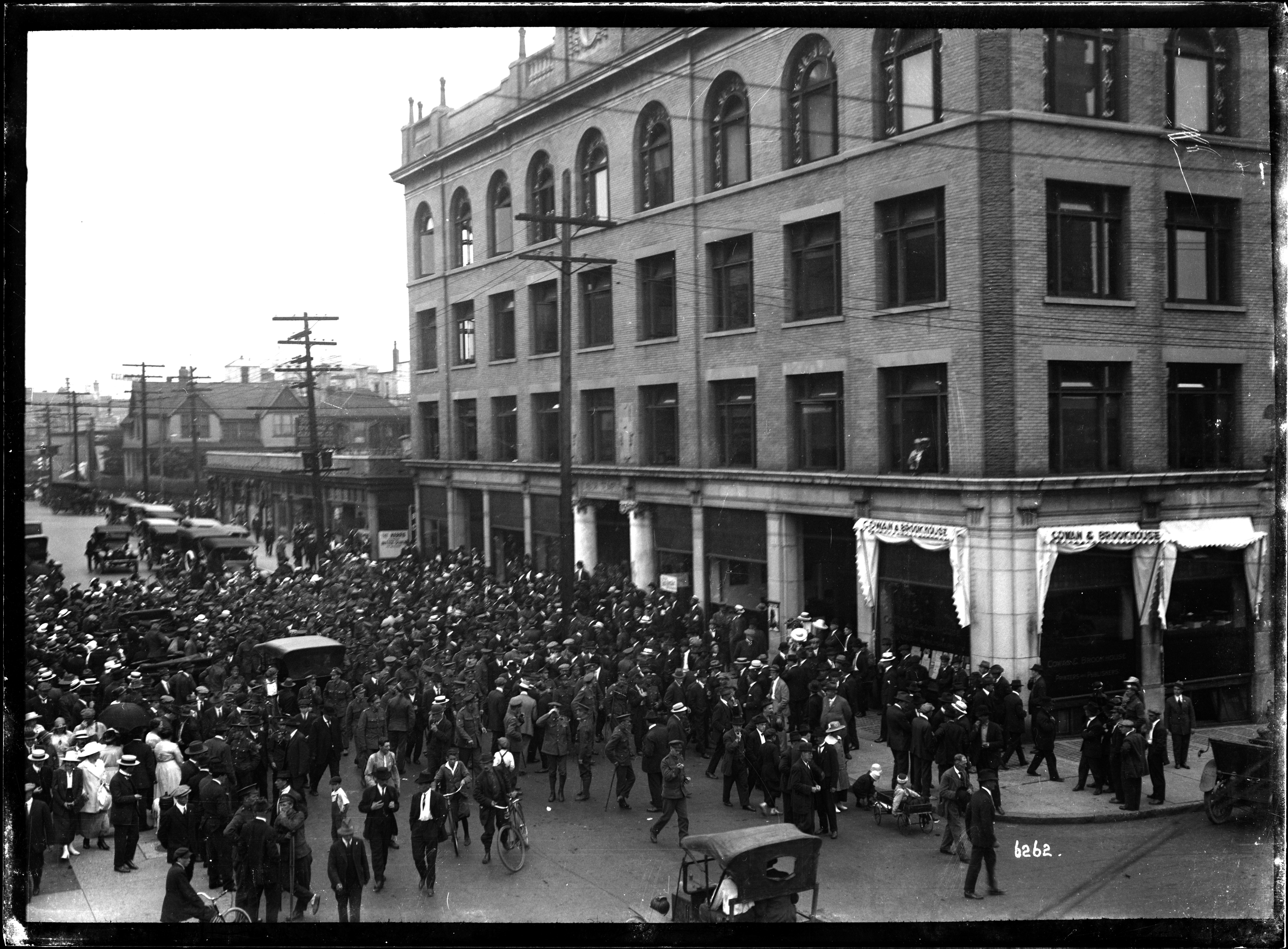
- Vancouver Labour Temple being raided during the strike
- Date: 2-3 August, 1918
- Location: Vancouver, British Columbia; 49°15′39″N 123°06′50″W
- Result: Attacks on Labour Temple and Longshoremen's Hall; Resignation and subsequent re-election of strike leaders

The 1918 Vancouver general strike was a general strike that took place in response to the death of Albert "Ginger" Goodwin on 2 August 1918. It was the first general strike in the history of British Columbia and a pivotal event in the Canadian Labour Revolt, which would unfold over the following years.

== Background ==
=== First World War ===
In 1912, Canada experienced an economic depression, leading to mass unemployment, a decrease in the unionized workforce, and reduced wages for remaining workers. Wartime inflation caused real incomes to drop, particularly in 1917, and Vancouver shipbuilders experienced a labour shortage due to conscription.

The war also brought difficulties for radicals. The government banned radical organizations, censored their press organs, and banned strikes and lockouts. However, many radicals were encouraged by the Bolshevik Revolution in Russia, which they believed showed that a socialist revolution was possible in Canada.

=== Anti-Conscription Movement ===
By the outbreak of World War I, the pacifist movement, which had initially been supported by various religious groups—including the Quakers, Mennonites, Hutterites, and Doukhobors—had become an important part of Canadian radical ideology. The pacifist movement blended Christian beliefs and practices with radical Marxist and Labourite traditions.

In August 1917, Parliament passed the Military Service Act (MSA), which required all men from 20 to 45 to serve in the Canadian military. French Canadians strongly opposed the act due to economic concerns and ascendant nationalism, leading to riots in Quebec City. However, conscientious objection was most prominent in British Columbia, where the British Columbia Federation of Labour released a manifesto calling for the repeal of the MSA as well as an end to the capitalist system.

Among the conscientious objectors was Albert "Ginger" Goodwin, a coal miner and labour activist active in Cumberland, British Columbia. Goodwin opposed the war, viewing it as a competition between capitalists, and was initially exempted from service due to his poor health. However, he was promptly re-examined and declared fit for service. After several failed appeals, Goodwin fled to Comox Lake along with several other draft evaders, where he successfully hid from the authorities until July.

However, on 27 July, 1918, Goodwin was discovered and shot by the Royal Canadian Mounted Police, causing outrage amongst labour leaders. Soon after Goodwin’s shooting, the Metal Trades Council (MTC) and Vancouver Trades and Labour Council (VTLC) called for a 24-hour general strike to take place on 2 August at noon.

== Strike ==
5,600 workers left their jobs at noon: approximately one-third of the unionized labour force. Shipyard workers, longshoremen, garment workers, and electrical workers all participated in the strike. The press was critical of the strikers, with the Vancouver Sun claiming that "every man who lays off, in obedience to the infamous recommendation of extremists without honor or conscience, will stain himself with something that can hardly be distinguished from deliberate treason". Many critics accused the strikers of being either Bolsheviks or German sympathizers.

Veterans were also incensed, with Great War Veterans Association Secretary A. E. Lees threatening the strikers with violence. The veterans followed through on their threat on the evening of 2 August, when they mobilized to storm the Labour Temple at 411 Dunsmuir Street (the present-day 411 Seniors Centre). Three hundred men ransacked the offices of the VTLC. After attempting to throw VTLC secretary Victor Midgely out of a window, the veterans forced him and a longshoreman to kiss the Union Jack. A woman working in the office was also badly bruised when she moved to prevent Midgely from being thrown out of the window. Prominent suffragette and VTLC member Helena Gutteridge was present at the scene.

On the morning of 3 August, the veterans attacked the Longshoremen’s Hall, demanding that union leaders leave the province until the end of the war. The longshoremen fought the rioting veterans off using chair legs as makeshift weapons. The confrontation ended when Vancouver mayor Robert Henry Otley Gale convinced the veterans to form a committee to negotiate with the longshoremen. The rioters then moved on to the Cambie Street grounds and the workers eventually returned to their jobs.

== Aftermath and legacy ==
Several of the strike's critics alleged that its leaders had acted without the blessing of the rank and file. Those leaders—including Ernie Winch, Jack Kavanah, George Thomas, William Pritchard, Joe Naylor, and Victor Midgely—contested this claim by pointing to the vote by VTLC delegates that supported the strike 117 to 1. After the strike, all of its leaders resigned in a gamble to show the extent of the workers' support. Nearly all were re-elected to their positions, demonstrating widespread approval for the general strike amongst organized workers.

The strike-call was province-wide, but it was only in the city of Vancouver that it reached general strike proportions. Numerous other strikes took place in the city that year, and the general strike was as much a show of labour strength as it was a political protest over Goodwin's death. At the time, the strike was controversial. Some saw Goodwin as a martyr for the labour movement while others saw the strike as a betrayal of Canadian ideals.

Although only 24 hours in duration, the strike was an important marker in the Canadian Labour Revolt, which peaked with the Winnipeg General Strike the following year. A 1919 Vancouver strike in sympathy with Winnipeg is still the longest general strike in Canadian history.

== See also ==
- List of incidents of civil unrest in Canada
