= Jubilee riots =

1875 religious riots in Toronto, Canada

The Jubilee riots of 1875 were an outbreak of Protestant-Catholic sectarian violence in Toronto. The riots happened during a series of Catholic religious pilgrimages related to the Jubilee year declared by Pope Pius IX.

The first riot occurred on September 26, during a pilgrims' march to the bishop's palace at St. Michael's Cathedral. The parade had been advertised in the Irish Canadian newspaper, which led a group of opponents to petition Mayor Francis Henry Medcalf to have the event banned. It proceeded, however, with a pledge from the Catholic clergy that it would remain "quiet, peaceful, and Christian". Stone throwing between pilgrims and onlookers started at Spadina Avenue and Queen Street and spread to several nearby streets. There were reports of shots being fired on Simcoe Street. The police attempted to separate the pilgrims and their attackers, but were briefly overwhelmed before charging the rioters with batons and seizing several firearms.

Commentary following the riots was divided. Editorials in the Mail criticized those who attacked the pilgrims as having started the riot but questioned the wisdom and tact of the Catholic organizers of the parade for the route chosen and for advertising it in the Irish Canadian. The Globe defended the pilgrims as law-abiding. The Leader suggested that asking members of Catholic societies to line the streets to watch the parade was asking for trouble. The Toronto Orange Lodge demanded that similar future marches be suppressed. A tense public meeting was held where the city fathers implored the Catholics not to march again.

A second riot broke out on October 3. Stone throwing began at McGill Square and was soon accompanied by pistol fire. This led to a full-pitched battle between pilgrims and anti-processionists, which spilled out into multiple locations. Many were hurt, with rioters being beaten back by police. Cavalry, under the command of the mayor himself, was brought up to defend the pilgrims.

Following the second riot, the press roundly condemned the anti-processionists, and praised the authorities. They were especially keen to point out that while the mob may have been Protestant, the mayor and troops that had defended Catholics' right to worship were also largely Protestant. An offshoot of the Orange Order called the Young Britons was accused of incitement by witnesses and in editorials by the Toronto Globe.

== See also ==
- List of incidents of civil unrest in Canada
- Christie Pits riot (1933)
- Anti-Greek Riots in Toronto (1918)
