= Battle at Old Market Square =

1934 protest in Winnipeg, Manitoba

- Date: 5 June 1934
- Location: Winnipeg, Manitoba, Canada
- Result: Police intervention: Canadian Nationalist Party loses support

Parties
Canadian Nationalist Party	Various anti-fascist groups	Winnipeg Police Service

Number
75 to 100	500 counter protesters	

Casualties and losses
20 wounded 7 arrested		

The Battle at Old Market Square was an anti-fascist protest on 5 June 1934 in Winnipeg, Manitoba, Canada.

Members of the Canadian Nationalist Party (CNP) planned a rally at the Old Market Square, in Winnipeg's Exchange District. An estimated 75 to 100 sympathizers of Adolf Hitler and Benito Mussolini gathered there. The event was "a public provocation aimed at the organized labor movement, Jews, and minority communities". Five hundred protesters from various anti-fascist groups converged on the rally. At least 20 CNP members were injured, and police arrested seven as they suppressed the confrontation.

The battle "demonstrated the successful and deeply rooted popular resistance to fascist provocations" in Winnipeg. After that, the CNP held no further public meetings. The effect was lasting: "no fascist group in the city would ever find itself in a position to mount such public campaigns of discrimination".

== See also ==
- List of incidents of civil unrest in Canada
