= Yonge Street riot =

Civil disturbance in Toronto

The Yonge Street riot was a civil disturbance that occurred in Toronto, Ontario, Canada, on the night of May 4, 1992. It stemmed from a protest held against police brutality on two black men - Rodney King in the U.S. and Raymond Lawrence in Toronto. Some present engaged in looting and wilful damage.

== Events ==
Originally, the protest was focused on the police beating of Rodney King, as the officers that beat King had recently been acquitted. However, a young Black man named Raymond Lawrence was killed in Toronto on May 2 by two officers of the Peel Regional Police. Accordingly, the protest grew to encompass Lawrence's killing as well.

The protest began at the United States consulate on University Avenue, and then moved to the intersection of Yonge and Bloor Streets, and by then had turned into a violent looting of and damage to local shops. It was led by the Black Action Defence Committee. Witnesses noted that many engaged in looting and violence were white skinheads.

== Aftermath ==
Following the disturbance, according to a contemporaneous report in the Toronto Star, Ontario premier Bob Rae called for "reforms" in the "education and justice systems". Rae tasked Stephen Lewis with drafting a report to analyze the causes of the disturbance. Alexander and Glaze summarize Lewis's conclusions as follows: "[w]hile the LAPD trial verdict, and the May 2 Toronto police shooting death … acted as catalysts, the root causes of black unrest were simmering frustration over police mistreatment, discrimination in employment and housing, and a school system dominated by Eurocentric curricula."

== See also ==
- List of incidents of civil unrest in Canada

== Sources ==
- Walkom, Thomas Lawrence (1994). Rae Days. Toronto: Key Porter Books. ISBN 1-55013-598-8. OCLC 30669140.
