= Helena Gutteridge =

Canadian Labour Activist (1879–1960)

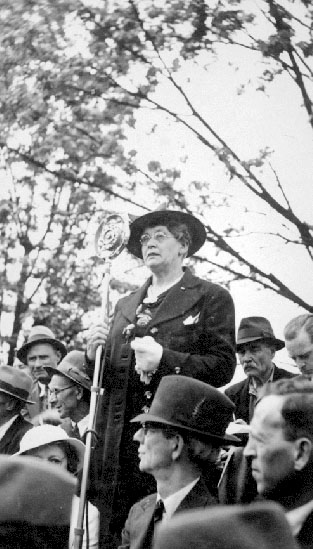
- Helena Gutteridge addressing demonstrators during the Post Office sit-down strike, Vancouver. 1938.

Vancouver city councillor
- In office 1937–1940

Personal details
- Born: April 8, 1879 London, England
- Died: October 1, 1960 (aged 81) Vancouver, British Columbia, Canada
- Party: Co-operative Commonwealth Federation
- Spouse: Oliver Fearn (m. 1919–1928)
- Occupation: Tailor, Labour Activist, Suffragist, City councillor of Vancouver

Helena Gutteridge (8 April 1879 – 1 October 1960) was a British-born Canadian feminist, suffragist, trade unionist and the first female city councillor in Vancouver, British Columbia, Canada.

She was recognized for being a pioneer, pushing for women's rights during a time when gender equality was not yet a prominent social movement. A leading advocate for women’s rights in British Columbia, she campaigned for voting rights, fair wages, and equal employment for women, and for social reforms during the early decades of the twentieth century.

== Early life and background ==
She was born in Victorian England in Battersea, London, to Charles Henry Gutteridge and his wife Sophia Richardson.

They had their first daughter Emily in 1877 and their second daughter Helena Rose (known as Nell to her family) on 8 April 1879. The couple eventually had four more children.

At the time of her birth, a smallpox outbreak was underway and 64 cases of smallpox had already been reported. By the third year of the rapidly spreading disease, a critical epidemic had developed throughout the country.

Gutteridge lost a brother at the age of two months from whooping cough. A lack of sanitation and hygiene measures marked her childhood.

Her father was born in 1854 in the Hampshire village of Micheldever, situated an hour away from London. He was from a family of blacksmiths and perpetuated the tradition by taking over his own father's forge. At the age of twenty, he left Micheldever and went to London to find work. He then married the daughter of a labourer, Sophia Richardson, in 1876. Sophia, Gutteridge's mother, was born in 1858 in Marylebone district, London. They both settled in the Wandsworth area of Battersea, and Charles found work with the local blacksmith.

Charles found work as a labourer in Chelsea, and the family moved from Battersea. However, at this time Chelsea was being redeveloped, and a new class of people living in the suburbs and working in the city was buying and reconstructing the area. The family was a victim of gentrification and had to move further from the centre every two to three years, to give way to fashionable boutiques or professional offices.

The Cadogan family comprised the main landlords in Chelsea and directed most investment companies in the destruction and reconstruction of the city. Charles found employment in the reconstruction industry. Her childhood was defined by their constant relocation due to the radical transformation of Chelsea. The family was continuously on the move to escape the wreckers.

== Education ==
Until the age of 13, Gutteridge attended the Holy Trinity Church School where she learned basic reading, writing, arithmetics, history and poetry. Students were constantly reminded that they were indebted to the Cadogan Family for their education. As such, the idea of class difference became ingrained from a young age. The consequence of class difference further manifested in her life when she had to stop attending school because education was only accessible to the privileged class which could afford private schools. Besides class difference, gender discrimination also denied her access to further education. For a working-class family in London in the late 1890s, education was not a priority for girls and her family decided to fund the education of their sons instead of daughters. This decision planted the seed of feminism in young Gutteridge and marked her lifelong commitment to change the prejudices and unfair treatments that women face.

To continue pursuing an education, Gutteridge left home at the age of 14 and gradually lost touch with her family. She began supporting herself while attending Regent Street Polytechnic School and the Royal Sanitary Institute. At the Royal Sanitary Institute, she received a South Kensington Department of Education certificate in teaching and sanitary science, which equipped her with relevant and necessary knowledge and skills to manage the political scene of Vancouver when she became a city councillor in 1937.

To support herself while continuing to receive an education, Gutteridge worked as an apprentice in a draper's shop, where she started off by running errands and gradually moved up to high positions such as sewer, cutter, fitter. Eventually, she became a tailor at the John Lewis establishment on Oxford street, which was a notable position for a woman in the 1880s. The shop provided food and room for its workers.

Three to four people were accommodated in every room, and no personal items were allowed. Furthermore, it was forbidden to get married while working there. This living system allowed the employer to not pay decent wages to its employees. Despite working twelve hours every weekday and half a day on Saturday for an extremely low wage, she understood that economic independence was critical for her to receive equal treatment and to continue attending school. Her experience then also informed her later decision to fight for equal wages between men and women in British Columbia.

Gutteridge completely lost contact with her family, except for her sister Emily. It was mainly her nephew Thomas Charles Gutteridge who recalled family life as he was sent to live with his grandparents.

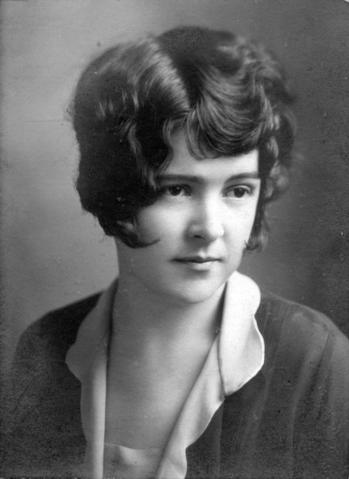
Helena Gutteridge in 1911

From 1893 to 1911, while working as a tailor in London to support herself and to fund her education, she was also actively engaged with the female suffrage movement in the United Kingdom. She joined the Women's Social and Political Union (WSPU), which provided her with ample political experiences and skills that laid the foundation of her political career. In September 1911, Gutteridge set sail for the westernmost part of Canada. She immediately became actively involved in the female suffrage movement in Vancouver and spent most of her time there helping women who faced economic hardships.

== Personal life ==
At forty years old, Gutteridge married Oliver Fearn, a twenty-six-year-old poultry farmer, in October 1919. The couple settled outside of Vancouver, in a rural community named Mount Lehman. The area was deprived of electricity and running water. Commerce was primarily conducted with paddle-wheel steamboats, but she did not experience social isolation. She was looking for calm and peace and spent her days taking care of the farm between 1921 and 1931. She enjoyed the sense of a nuclear family found in this community. She grew fond of the community and found valuable relationships among the families of farmers surrounding her.

Even in this rural situation, she was engaged in women's rights and its surrounding issues within society. She even founded a branch of the women's institute in Mount Lehman. Gutteridge was involved in the literary and debate society of the region. She enjoyed this community life and hard physical work. The couple did not have any children. Ollie committed adultery with Rose Dennison, a widow with four children. During this era, social standards and legislation served men more advantageously. As a result, Gutteridge was humiliated and blamed for not being good enough as a wife to keep her husband loyal. She did not ask for a divorce, but Oliver petitioned to annul his marriage, saying he did not want to commit bigamy. Gutteridge didn't mind the humiliation, and the divorce was granted in 1928. She took care of the farm for a few more years before heading back to Vancouver in 1932.

== Career ==
=== Political career ===
==== Suffrage Movement in London, England ====
Gutteridge began her lifelong involvement in politics and social reforms with the Women's Suffrage Movement in the United Kingdom and her engagement with the Women's Social and Political Union (WSPU). The WSPU was a progressive women-only organization that campaigned for female suffrage. A main theme that resonated through their activities was "Votes for Women".

Through the WSPU, she received ample guidance and training on making persuasive and emotive public speeches. She was also widely recognized within the organization for her leadership potential and managerial skills. Throughout 1910, the sight of Gutteridge making public speeches and staging massive processions together with other militant suffragists, such as Marie Brackenbury, became frequent scenes on the streets of London. Furthermore, she learned public speaking and techniques of activism from militant suffragists such as Emmeline Pankhurst.

The suffrage movement by the WSPU had widespread international influence and repercussions. A member of a sub-division of WSPU told the then Canadian Prime Minister Robert Borden that "We are not a national association, but an Imperial one…And these members in Canada have asked us to help them and to instruct them... We have members who have emigrated there." British suffragists sought to validate their domestic movement by incorporating the enfranchisement of women living in the greater imperial territory.

As part of the WSPU's effort to vitalize the suffrage movement in Canada, Gutteridge was sent to the westernmost region of Canada. On 8 September 1911, she boarded the Empress of Ireland and set sail for Quebec. Upon her arrival, she continued her journey towards British Columbia via the Canadian Pacific Railway. What was intended to be a short stay eventually turned out to be a lifelong commitment to achieve gender equality in British Columbia

==== Suffrage Movement in British Columbia, Canada ====
The central vessels of the suffrage movement in British Columbia from 1910 to 1917 included the Women's Temperance Union, the National Council of Women, the University Women's Club and the BC Political Equality League. Out of all pro-suffrage political organizations, the Political Equality League, an organization that focused on achieving female suffrage, gained the most momentum among working middle-class women initially. Efforts at securing women's access to the ballot by the Political Equality League at this stage, however, were generally ineffective. To rekindle the suffrage movement, the league then branched out into smaller and more action-oriented organizations such as the British Columbia Women Suffrage League, the Women's Freedom Union and the Equal Franchise Association. Out of the three new branches, the Women Suffrage League founded by Gutteridge turned out to be the most successful.

Gutteridge sought to revitalize the suffrage movement in British Columbia by founding the Women Suffrage League, and Pioneer Political Equality. The Pioneer Political Equality held frequent evening meetings for working women in the Labour Temple in downtown Vancouver, and the Women Suffrage League eventually successfully secured the right to vote for white women across British Columbia in 1917. Suffrage was not extended to women of Asian and Indian descent until after the end of the Second World War. She further contributed to the suffrage movement by supporting women through co-founding the Women's Employment League and the Carvell Hall Cooperative Settlement to provide employment and shelter to women in need.

Furthermore, while working to mitigate feminist issues in the labour movement, she also served as a columnist for the British Columbia Federationist and women's correspondent for the Labour Gazette under the federal Department of Labour.

==== Economic Security, Equal Pay and Union Movement ====
Besides pursuing feminist goals, Gutteridge also focused on union actions and equal pay for female workers. She saw female suffrage, unionism and economic independence as interconnected movements. Upon realizing the stark disparity between the wages of men and women across British Columbia in 1912, she joined the local Tailors' Union and later became the first female member, then treasurer and secretary of the Vancouver Trades and Labour Council between 1913 and 1921. She aimed to represent women in a male-dominated milieu through trade unions and uniting feminist and labour organizations. Her arrival in Vancouver provided local female union movements with a timely leadership. She was involved in the formation of the Laundry Workers' Union and later the Vancouver Laundry Workers' Strike in 1918.

For Gutteridge, establishing economic equality was an essential premise to achieve political equality and genuine gender parity. She remarked that "[t]he economic value of the ballot is one of the strongest arguments in favour of votes for women" and "[t]he political organization of women and the organization of women into trade unions, although two separate and independent movements, are nevertheless supplementary and necessary to each other, if the economic freedom of women is to be obtained."

Economic conditions were especially harsh for women in British Columbia after a prolonged period of recession in 1912. Not only were women often the first employees to be laid off, they received significantly less wage than men and qualified for fewer government benefits. To ease the economic burden that women in Vancouver faced during this period for time, she organized a toy-making co-operative while pressuring the provincial government to provide more assistance for women.

The toy-making co-operative officially opened in October 1914, when Christmas was just around the corner. The festive season created a demand for toys and an economic opportunity for the co-operative. By 9 November, 60 girls and women were making dolls and toys for a daily wage of $3.50. By the time Christmas arrived, the co-operative started to additionally include cooking and dressmaking as part of their services. More than 150 women were employed by the co-operative before 1914 came to an end. Located at 1027 Robson Street in Vancouver, the site of the co-operative also housed unemployed women with its unused rooms.

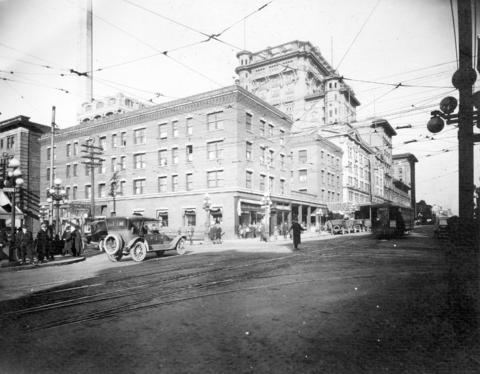
View of the west side of the 700 Block of Granville Street

The toy-making co-operative eventually ceased to operate in February 1915, after providing jobs for nearly 500 women in Vancouver and helping 700 women to obtain meal tickets. At the peak of its operation, the co-operative expanded in scale to include a retail outlet at 700 Granville Street. Regardless of its short lifespan, the co-operative was a remarkable achievement as it solved the immediate economic hardships that many women in Vancouver faced.

Gutteridge continued to fight for economic security and equality for women by campaigning for the inclusion of equal pay for women and men in the constitution of the Vancouver Trades and Labor Council (VTLC). In 1917, she organized the Minimum Wage League, an organization that successfully obtained the Minimum Wage Bill for Women in 1918.

==== Co-operative Commonwealth Federation ====
On 1 August 1932, the Co-Operative Commonwealth Federation (CCF) was founded in Calgary, Alberta. The CCF was a political coalition of progressive farmer, socialist and labour groups that campaigned for economic reforms to address the widespread repercussions of the Great Depression. Integration with American and European economies resulted in Canada being one of the worst hit economies with the collapse of global finance.

In the same year, Gutteridge returned to Vancouver after splitting with Oliver Fearn. A modest estimate of the total number of unemployed persons in Vancouver by June 1932 stood at 77,428. Impoverishment, shortage of appropriate city infrastructures and a surge in the number of unemployed and homeless persons prompted a political response to the severe economic condition across Canada.

The CCF's solution focused on economic reforms. The socialist outlook of the CCF's Regina Manifesto aligned with her political and economic convictions. Together with many other progressive women such as Dorothy Steeves, Elizabeth Kerr, Frances Moren, Gutteridge plunged into the movement and continued to work tirelessly to advance the goals of the CCF until 1942.

She started her engagement with the CCF with subscription campaigns for The Commonwealth, an official newspaper of the CCF. In 1933, she became a campaign worker during the provincial election. She was often found speaking in an overcrowded living room to an audience eager to learn about the new socialist movement. The CCF's election campaign quickly picked up momentum. Seven of its members were elected into office across British Columbia and the CCF officially became the opposition party to the newly elected Liberal Party.

Besides taking part in election campaigns, Gutteridge spent most of her early years in the CCF focusing on addressing unemployment through economic reforms. She worked with other party leaders like Harold Winch, Ernest Winch, Mildred Fahrni and Sarah Colley, eventually setting up the CCF Unemployment Conference in 1934 to tackle the social problem. The conference mainly sought to organize the unemployed population and to gain more financial relief from the provincial government. The conference, however, was largely unsuccessful in establishing itself as the fundamental vessel in the restructuring of the provincial economy. Gutteridge eventually left the conference in the fall of 1935 to join the Planning Commission of the CCF, where she became one of the key drivers behind the design of a new socialist society.

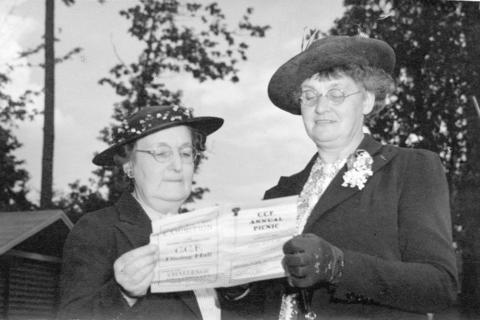
Mrs. Susie Lane Clark and Alderwoman Helena Gutteridge examining a C.C.F. annual picnic brochure

Throughout her time at the CCF, Gutteridge was not only a party leader, but also a devoted socialist who sought to reform British Columbia's economy. She wrote: "The CCF is not a party in the conventional sense, but a part of a worldwide movement of forward-thinking men and women who can visualize a world in which co-operative effort will replace the present cut-throat competition, and in which security and plenty will replace poverty and insecurity."

==== Election into City Council ====
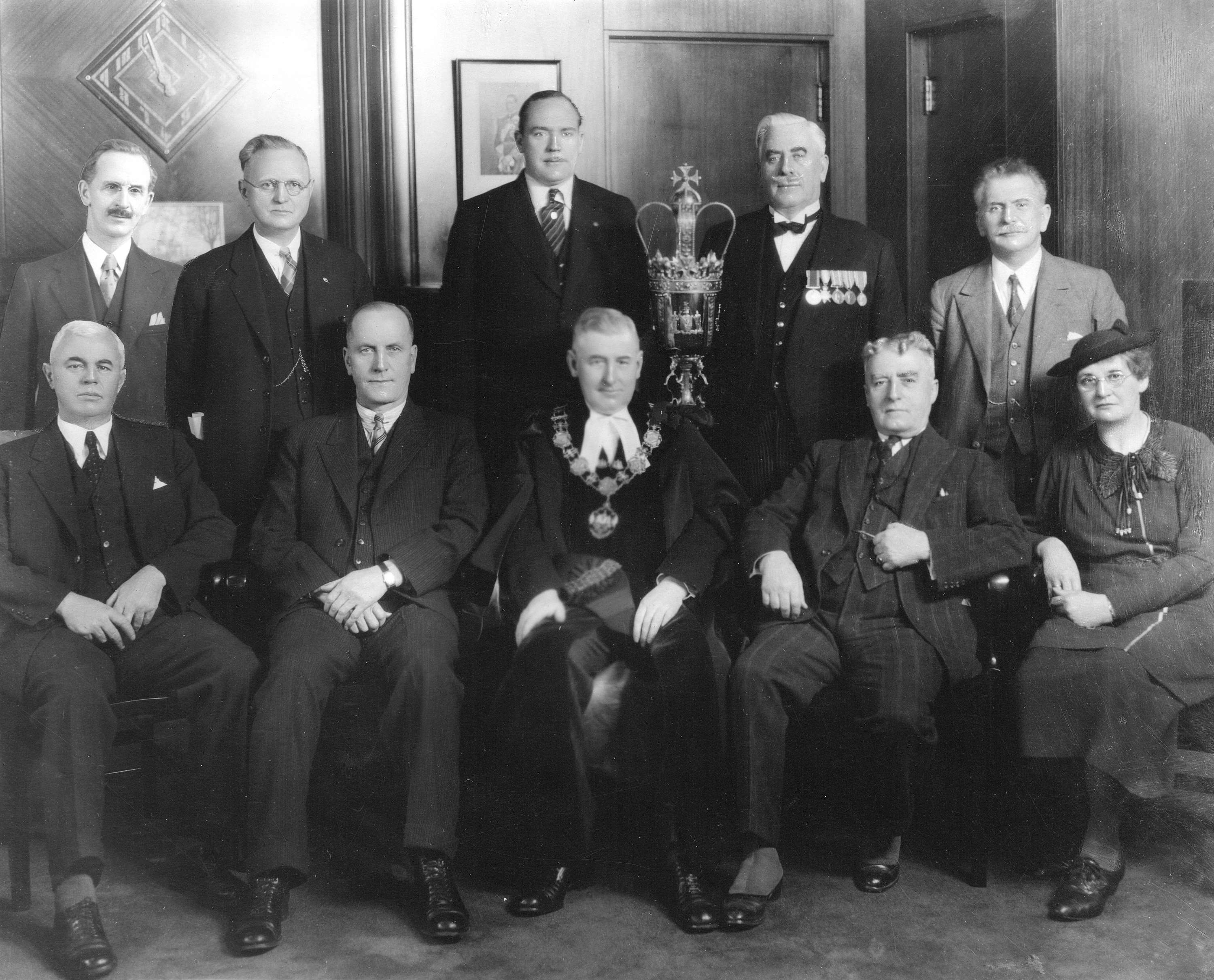
Members of the Vancouver city council, including Helena Gutteridge

In 1937, Gutteridge became the first woman elected to Vancouver City Council. During her time in office, she continued to defend women's rights. She vehemently protested against a proposal that requires employers to not hire married women with a working husband in order to reduce the unemployment rate in Vancouver. She also objected discriminatory policies based on race, and supported the extension of suffrage to racial minorities who have been a resident of British Columbia for at least 12 months.

One of her most remarkable achievements during her two and half years in office is fuelling a social housing movement in British Columbia. Throughout the 1930s, Vancouver started to experience shortage of affordable housing due to a sharp decrease in the number of new sites constructed. She believed that government-subsidized housing was the most effective solution to Vancouver's housing dilemma. The other city councillors, however, were reluctant to further increase the government's financial burden. Apart from the economic debris of the Great Depression, the city also had to first fund a housing program for returned soldiers and take over the mortgages of homeowners who could no longer afford their mortgages.

Despite facing strong objections to her proposal, Gutteridge succeeded in forming the Housing Committee which specialized in forming a detailed housing plan for Vancouver. She also served as the Chair of Vancouver's Town Planning and Parks Committee, primarily focusing on government subsidized social housing. Even though a government-sponsored housing policy did not materialize during her time in office, she set a strong foundation for British Columbia's social housing policies that were later implemented in the 1950s.

==== Fading out from the political scene ====
The CCF was defeated in December 1939 during the provincial by-election, after both Gutteridge and her running mate Alfred Hurry were defeated. Some blamed her defeat on her blatant refusal to let the city of Vancouver pay for the visit of King George VI and Queen Elizabeth. She remarked that "We shouldn't be responsible for putting on a circus from which others benefit. Let the people benefit by the show pay for it." Despite being a monarchist at heart, she believed that the city should be spending on the poor, the hungry and the unemployed instead of entertaining the royal couple. Gutteridge ran for re-election again in 1940 and 1941, both times without success.

With no more council responsibilities, Gutteridge diverted all her attention and energy to the CCF by chairing the Organization Committee and serving as the provincial executive of the party until her decision to move to Lemon Creek in 1942 to work as a social worker.

=== Social work career ===
Following the surprise Japanese attack on Pearl Harbor in December 1941, Canada declared war on Japan. The most gravely implicated group within Canada due to this development was Japanese Canadians. Anti-Japanese sentiments rapidly heightened across British Columbia. and many threatened to riot if the Japanese population was not removed from the coast. The federal government did little to dispel this unfounded fear of internal invasion by Japanese Canadians.

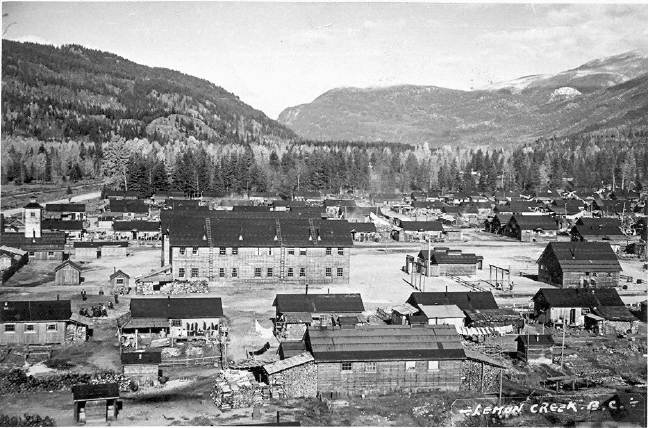
The Lemon Creek Internment Camp, 1944–1945

On 16 January 1942, the Canadian government invoked the War Measures Act and created 'protected areas' where Japanese nationals and Japanese Canadians are forbidden to enter. About 21,000 Japanese nationals & Japanese Canadians were forcefully expelled from their homes and relocated to Lemon Creek.

Gutteridge took up the position as a welfare worker in Lemon Creek for the Japanese population. At this point of time in 1942, she was no longer part of the nucleus decision-making circle in the CCF and she needed to make a living through other means. As such, she welcomed the opportunity to offer humanitarian service to the Japanese population.

Gutteridge worked as a social worker in Lemon Creek from 1942 to the spring of 1945. She was remembered by many residents of Lemon Creek, as she dealt with the day-to-day problems that family faced and was genuinely committed to improving their standard and quality of living.

== Legacy ==
In 2017, Parliamentary Secretary to the President of the Treasury Board and Member of Parliament for Vancouver Quadra, Joyce Murray, commemorated Gutteridge . On behalf of the Canadian federal government and the Minister of Environment and Climate Change, Catherine Mckenna, Murray declared Gutteridge as a national historic person at Vancouver City Hall, serving Gutteridge's legacy with a Historic Sites and Monuments Board of Canada plaque.

"I am proud to honour Helena Gutteridge as a national historic person. She was a visionary reformer who represented female workers in a male-dominated trade union milieu, helped organize unions for women, and built bridges between feminist and labour organizations. As we celebrate the 150th anniversary of our great nation, it is important for all of us to learn more about the people, places and events that have shaped our rich cultural and natural history." – Joyce Murray, Parliamentary Secretary to the President of the Treasury Board and Member of Parliament for Vancouver Quadra.

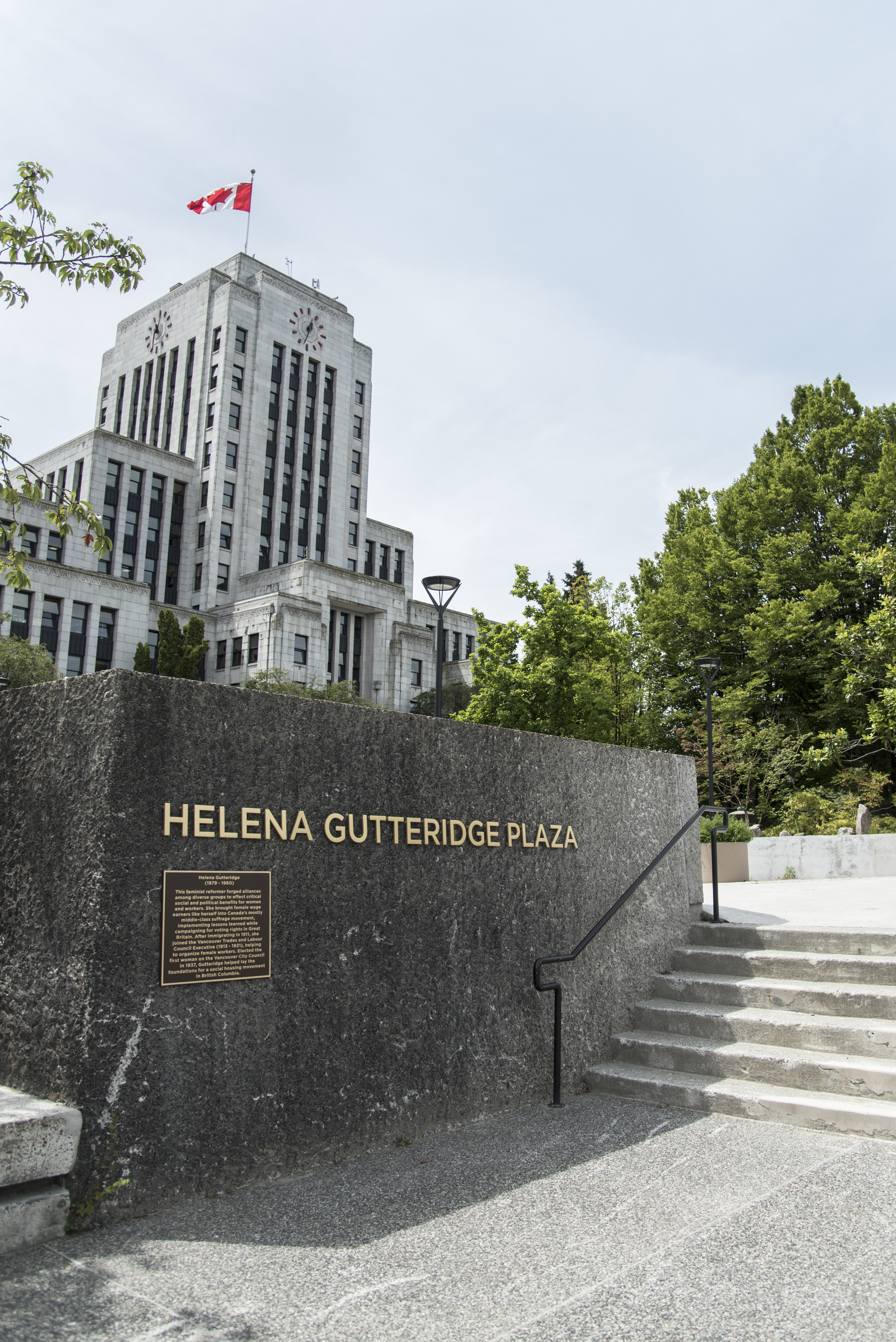
Helena Gutteridge Plaza

"I'm honoured to celebrate the life and legacy of Helena Gutteridge, the first woman elected to Vancouver City Council. Helena's work as a tireless advocate for women's issues laid important groundwork for issues still very relevant to Vancouver today: gender equality, equal pay, homelessness and the need for safe, affordable housing for all. Today's celebration in Helena's memory is an important reminder to keep working toward social and political change for more equality, diversity and inclusion." – His Worship Gregor Robertson Mayor, City of Vancouver.

Her progressive visions and her relentless drive to fight for women's rights were honoured with the Helena Gutteridge Plaza on International Women's Day in 2018. The plaza was named to commemorate her achievements throughout her political career and to celebrate her commitment to securing women's suffrage in British Columbia. On March 8, International Women's Day, city dignitaries and community leaders revealed the plaza sign that recognizes her contribution to the city of Vancouver.

The mayor, Gregor Robertson, commented on the opening day of the plaza that "Today is not just about honouring Helena Rose Gutteridge and her struggle for justice and equality, but it is about setting our intention going forward because her work, unfortunately, is continuing and has a long way to go."

Elizabeth Ball, a then city councillor, said that Gutteridge's political achievements and commitment were inspiring to her and any woman who joins the city council because of her push-back against prejudices and her willingness to work for a diverse population. Ball studied Gutteridge's background of when she was planning to set foot in politics.

The plaza is located at Yukon Street and 11th Avenue on the north side of the City Hall, overlooking Vancouver's skyline. The plaza is a public space that holds community activities and events for residents to enjoy and connect with one another. Residents can use the space in the plaza to organize events or activities by obtaining a special event permit from the City.

== Retirement ==
In 1947, Gutteridge moved into the house of Hilda and Denny Kristiansen at 1220 Barclay Street in Vancouver and lived there for the rest of her life. During her retirement years, she remained invested in the advancement of women's rights and she continued to be politically active. She became a member of the CCF Provincial Council for Women and later a member of Women's International League for Peace and Freedom. In 1957, at the age of 78, she was still chairing occasional meetings at the Town Planning Commission in the city of Vancouver.

== Illnesses and death ==
Gutteridge died of pancreatic cancer at age 79 on October 1, 1960, in Vancouver, British Columbia, Canada.

Her memorial service was held at the chapel of Mount Pleasant Funeral Home.

== See also ==
- Andrea Reimer
- Mary Ellen Smith
- Emmeline Pankhurst
- Women's Suffrage in Canada
- Women's Suffrage in the United Kingdom
- History of the minimum wage
