= Gastown riots =

1971 riot in Vancouver, Canada

Coordinates: 49°17′00″N 123°6′15″W

The Gastown riot, known also in the plural as Gastown riots, also known as "the Battle of Maple Tree Square", occurred in Vancouver, British Columbia, Canada, on August 7, 1971. Following weeks of arrests by undercover drug squad members in Vancouver as part of a special police operation directed by City hall, police broke up a protest smoke-in in the Gastown neighbourhood. The smoke-in was organized by the Youth International Party (Vancouver Yippies) against the use of undercover agents and in favour of the legalization of marijuana. Of around two thousand protesters, 79 were arrested and 38 were charged.

Police were accused of heavy-handed tactics including indiscriminate beatings with their newly-issued riot batons. They also used horseback charges on crowds of onlookers and tourists.

A commission of inquiry into the incident was headed by Supreme Court Justice Thomas Dohm. The Inquiry cited the Yippies as instigators of the Smoke-In, calling them "intelligent and dangerous individuals", but was highly critical of the police's conduct and described the incident as a police riot.

The Gastown riots are commemorated in a two-story-high 2009 photo mural called Abbott & Cordova, August 7, 1971 by local artist Stan Douglas, installed in the atrium of the redeveloped Woodward's complex in the Downtown Eastside neighbourhood.

== See also ==
- List of incidents of civil unrest in Canada
