= Bloody Sunday (1938) =

1938 strike suppression in Vancouver, Canada

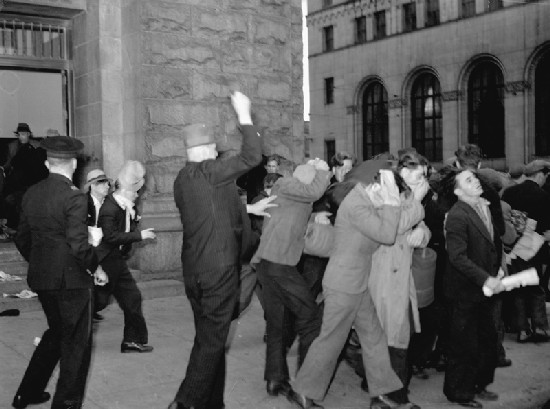
- A plainclothes Mountie clubbing protesters leaving the post office
- Date: 19 June 1938
- Location: Vancouver, British Columbia, Canada
- Caused by: Unemployment; The Great Depression; Cutting of financial support for relief camps
- Result: No concessions given

Parties
Relief Project Workers' Union	Royal Canadian Mounted Police

Lead figures
Steve Brodie	

Casualties
- Injuries: 100 injured (43 hospitalized)

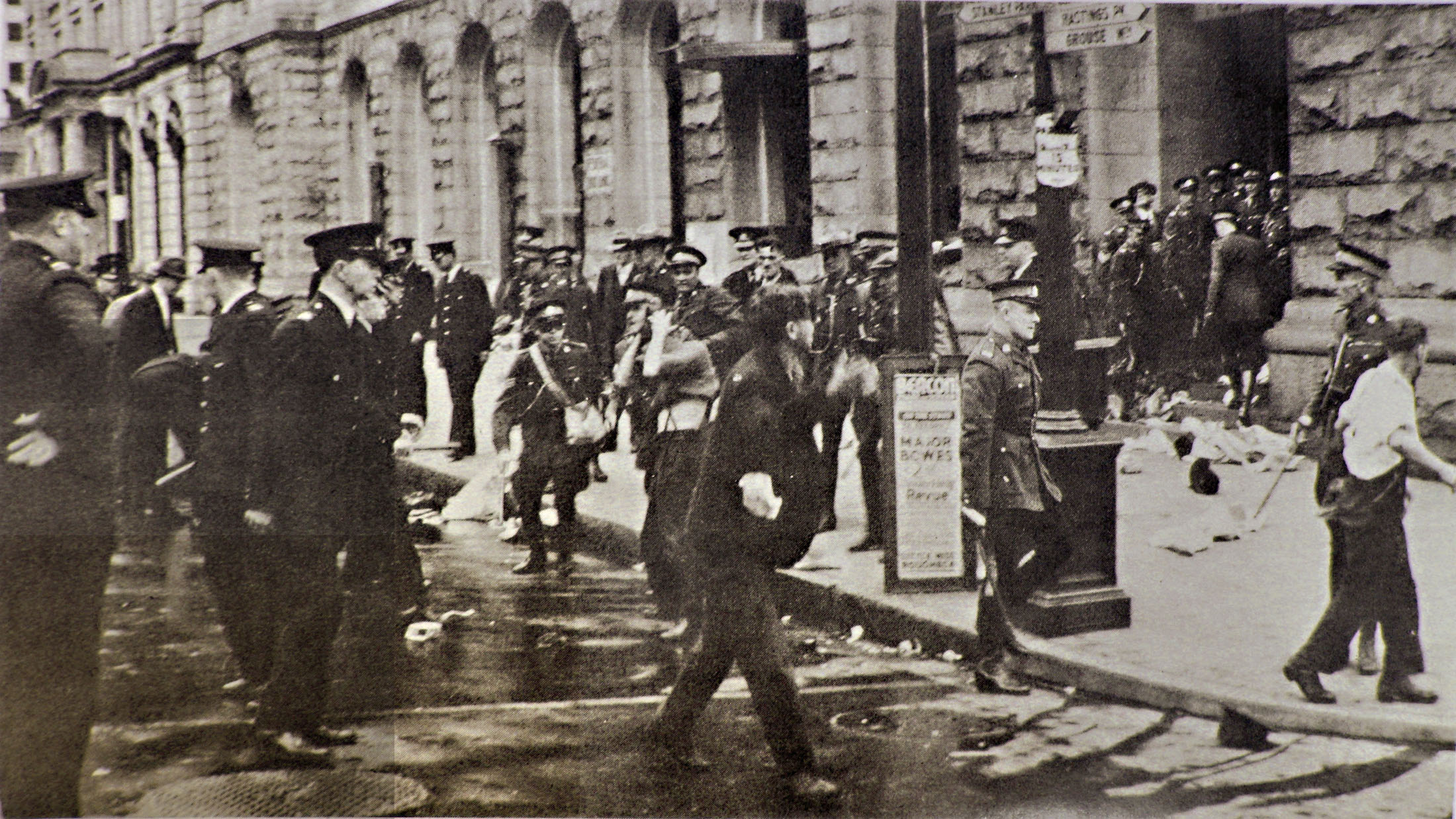
Police cordon during eviction of demonstrators

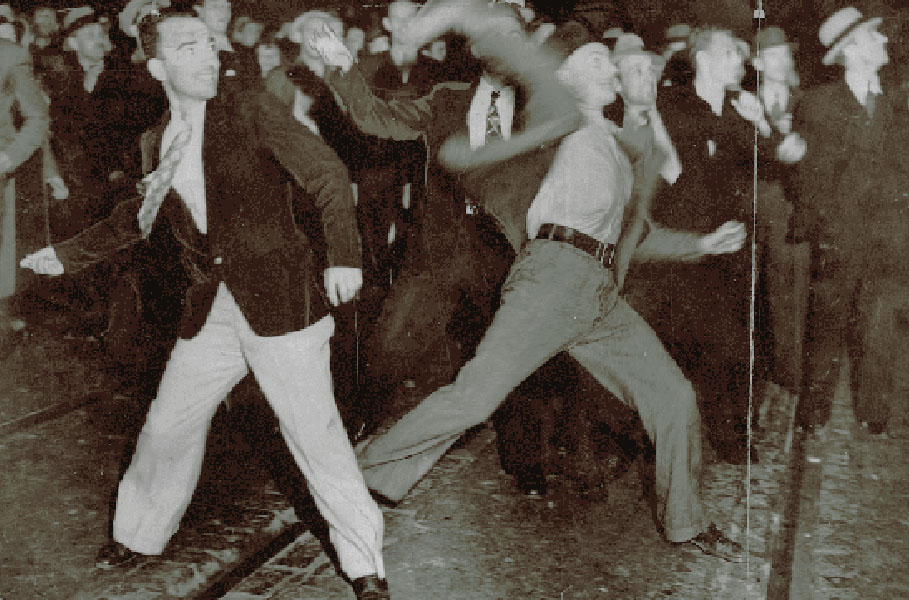
Protesters throwing rocks after eviction of sitdowners from the post office

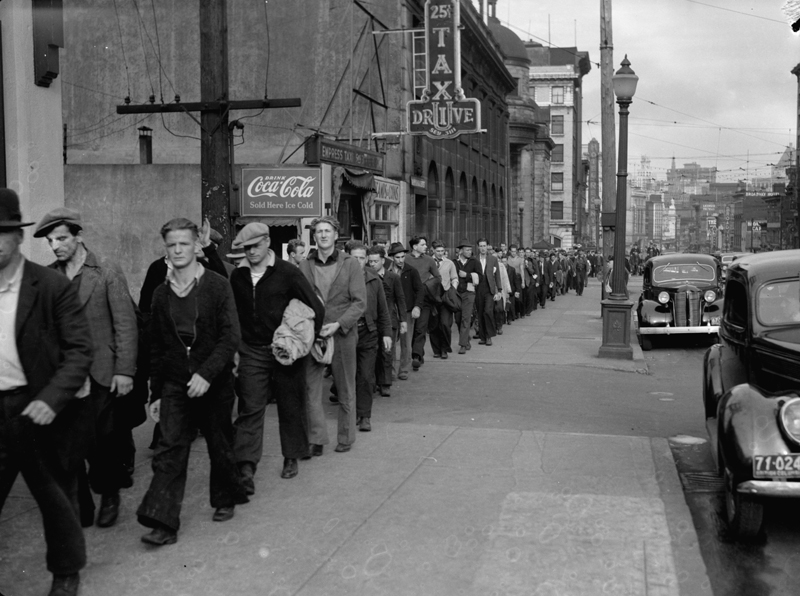
Unemployed protesters parading back to the East End on Bloody Sunday

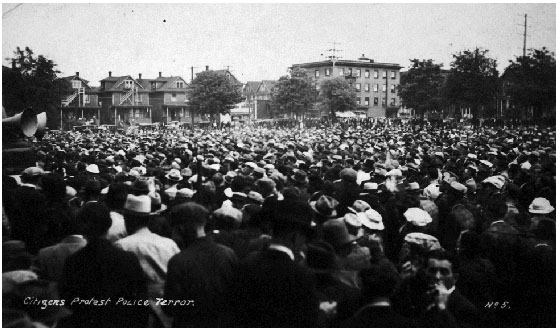
"Citizens protest police terror": Demonstration against police brutality in Oppenheimer Park

Bloody Sunday was the conclusion of a month-long "sitdowners' strike" by unemployed men at the main post office in Vancouver, British Columbia. It was Depression-era Vancouver's final violent clash between unemployed protesters and police that provoked widespread criticism of police brutality.

== Background ==
The Relief Project Workers' Union (RCPU) was the successor to the Relief Camp Workers' Union, which had led the 1935 strike that culminated in the On-to-Ottawa Trek and Regina Riot. After the earlier strike, the maligned federal relief camps run by the Department of National Defence were replaced by "relief projects" operated by the provinces and funded by both levels of government. The pay rate was similar to the earlier camps, five dollars a month, compared to the twenty cents per day offered by the "slave camps." The work was primarily seasonal work on farms.

As in 1935, unemployed men from across the country drifted to British Columbia because of the milder climate and because relief projects in forestry camps paid as much as three times that of equivalent farm placements. From the perspective of the government, the main difference between the earlier camps established under R. B. "Iron Heel" Bennett and the relief projects under William Lyon Mackenzie King's Liberals was that the men were comparatively isolated from one another, making it more difficult to organize. In both cases, the throngs of disaffected unemployed men were kept out of urban centres.

In early 1938, the federal government cut grants in aid to the provinces, effectively killing the relief project scheme. Premier Thomas Dufferin Pattullo closed the projects in April, claiming that British Columbia could not shoulder the burden alone. Unemployed men again flocked to Vancouver to protest government insensitivity and intransigence to their plight. The RCPU organized demonstrations and tin-canning (organized begging) in the city. Under the guidance of 26-year-old Steve Brodie, a member of the Communist Party of Canada and the leader of the Youth Division who had cut his activist teeth during the 1935 relief camp strike, protesters occupied Hotel Georgia, the Vancouver Art Gallery (then located at 1145 West Georgia Street), and the main post office (now the Sinclair Centre).

== Occupation ==
On the afternoon of 20 May 1938, approximately 1200 men left from four different halls in the East End of Vancouver, most of whom believed they were headed to Stanley Park for a protest rally. Only when one group arrived at the corner of Granville and Hastings streets was it evident that their destination was the post office. More than 700 men occupied the recently renovated building. Police reinforcements were called from Granville and Georgia Streets, leaving the way clear for a second column of 200 to enter Hotel Georgia, and a third group of 300 entered the art gallery.

The owner of Hotel Georgia refused to call the police and risk property damage that would likely result from a forcible eviction. That was the reaction anticipated by organizers and a reason that the sites were selected for the occupation (as the museum had been in 1935 and Hotel Vancouver would be for a 1940s sit-in). Instead, the hotel owner negotiated for the men to leave for $500.

The other two groups of protesters, however, maintained their positions for weeks to come. The art gallery closed for the duration of the occupation, probably more because of the spectacle of shabbily-dressed homeless men juxtaposed against the opulent exhibits of high art than for any logistical reasons. The RCPU emphasized discipline among its members to win, rather than alienate, public sympathy, which was evident at the other two locations that remained open to the public.

Chief Constable Colonel W. W. Foster attempted to persuade the men to leave, telling them that they had made their point and should now go home. Brodie responded that if they had homes, they would be in them and invited the colonel to arrest them. They offered to submit to arrest peacefully and continued to do so for the duration of the occupation. Foster refused and instead sought to manage the situation, rather than clog the local prison with 1000 demonstrators and give them the publicity that they sought. The attorney-general agreed with Foster that the strikers would likely vacate on their own in a matter of days.

However, even as the strike dragged on from days into weeks, the police stood by awaiting orders before proceeding with an eviction. Foster had earned a reputation for diplomacy with the unemployed during the 1935 strike, which he appeared to be cultivating again in 1938. Behind the scenes, however, Foster was plotting with politicians and the Royal Canadian Mounted Police (RCMP) to evacuate the post office and art gallery.

== Eviction ==
At five o'clock on the morning of 19 June 1938, presumably timed to surprise the strikers and to minimize the number of onlookers, Foster enlisted the services of Harold Winch of the Cooperative Commonwealth Federation, who had acted as a liaison between the unemployed and the police during the 1935 relief camp strike. His task now was to ensure that the treasures of the gallery went unscathed during the eviction. Along with police tear gas canisters, Winch successfully negotiated the withdrawal of the unemployed.

The post office was a different situation. Because it was a federal building, the RCMP led the assault, and the leader of these protesters, Steve Brodie, was renowned for his infectious militancy. The men responded to the first round of tear gas by smashing the windows for ventilation and arming themselves with whatever projectiles they could find. The RCMP entered the building and forcibly ejected the men, into the reach of police armed with batons standing outside. City police outside assisted the Mounties in the beatings.

More than 40 were hospitalized by the end of the day, only five of which were police and all of those were Vancouver police constables.

== Aftermath ==
The sitdowners and supporters, who promptly arrived on the scene, marched back to the East End, smashing the windows of the Woodward's and Spencer's department stores and other targets en route, causing $35,000 damage. As in 1935, the Ukrainian Labour Temple served as a makeshift hospital for protesters with the assistance of volunteer doctors and medical supplies that had been collected as an aid package destined for China.

Brodie was targeted for especially brutal treatment by the police and was beaten unconscious and left with a permanent eye injury. Another man, former militia sergeant Arthur Redseth, slipped on the post office floor during the fracas. "Little Mike", a fellow Serb, managed to drag Redseth out of the building to safety through the flailing police clubs but only after Redseth's eye was knocked out of its socket under the gauntlet of police clubs. Redseth was later rejected for military service in World War II because of his injury and became despondent and committed suicide in 1942. Little Mike required five stitches to his jaw from an injury he received after asking a police officer to call an ambulance for his friend. He died the same year as Redseth at Dieppe.

Despite the early morning timing of the eviction, supporters and onlookers quickly arrived at the scene as well as a photographer from the Vancouver Daily Province newspaper. News of what had happened traveled fast, and that Father's Day afternoon, 10,000 to 15,000 turned out at the Powell Street Grounds to protest against the "police terror" of Bloody Sunday. Many thousands also turned out to the CPR pier to see off a delegation to meet with the premier in Victoria.

In what seemed like a replay of the 1935 political response to the unemployment crisis, Pattullo refused any concessions to the unemployed, claiming these men had been shown "too much sympathy" already. Meanwhile, Pattullo used the incident as evidence that the federal government needed to restore relief funds to the provinces. King gave the same response as his Conservative opponent Bennett had given in 1935: relief was a provincial responsibility.

== See also ==
- List of incidents of civil unrest in Canada
- Battle of Ballantyne Pier
- Canada in the World Wars and Interwar Years
- Great Depression in Canada
- Helena Gutteridge
