= 2011 Vancouver Stanley Cup riot =

June 2011 riots in Vancouver, British Columbia, Canada

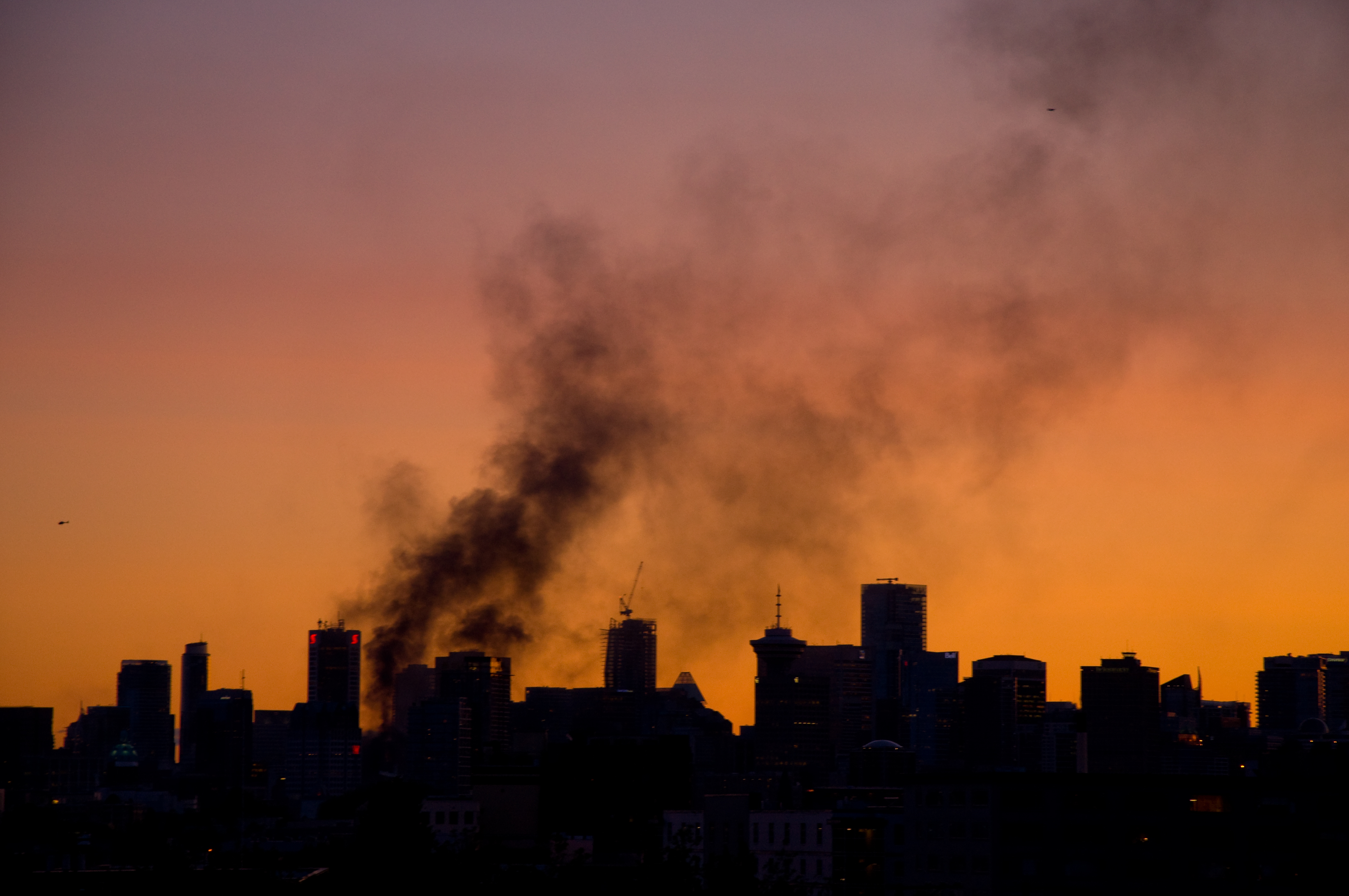
- Smoke billowing from fires in downtown Vancouver during the riot
- Date: June 15, 2011; 15 years ago
- Time: 7:45 p.m. – midnight (PDT)
- Location: Downtown Vancouver; 49°17′03″N 123°07′16″W
- Also known as: Vancouver riots
- Type: Sports riot; hooliganism; vandalism; arson; vehicle fires
- Cause: Vancouver Canucks series loss to the Boston Bruins in the 2011 Stanley Cup Final
- Deaths: 0
- Injuries: 140 (1 critically injured, 3 seriously)
- Property damage: $4 million CAD (estimated) ($5.48 million in 2025 dollars)

On the evening of June 15, 2011 in the downtown core of Vancouver, British Columbia, Canada, a riot broke out almost immediately after the conclusion of the Boston Bruins' victory over the Vancouver Canucks in game seven of the Final of the National Hockey League to win the Stanley Cup.

Nearly 150 people were injured during the incident, including four who suffered stab wounds. On the night of the riot, Vancouver police, made nearly 100 arrests, including 85 for breach of peace, eight for public intoxication and eight for criminal code offenses such as assault and theft. In 2015, four years after the riot, police completed their investigation and recommended final charges against two suspects, bringing the total to 887 charges against 301 people. The riot caused an estimated $4 million in damage with an extra $5 million being spent on additional staffing costs for prosecuting the rioters.

== Before the riot ==
=== Previous riots ===
Violence has occasionally occurred in the wake of sporting events in North America and Europe, including multiple riots in Canada since the 1980s. Edmonton Oilers fans set fires and looted in the Whyte Avenue ("Blue Mile") area of Edmonton when the team qualified for the 2006 Final, Montreal was vandalized by Montreal Canadiens fans after the 1986 and 1993 titles and during the 2008 and 2010 playoffs, and Vancouver itself had riots following the Canucks' defeat in 1994.

The 1994 riot occurred after Game 7 of the 1994 Stanley Cup Final, when the Canucks lost to the New York Rangers in an away game. A watch party hosted at the Canucks' then-home stadium, Pacific Coliseum, attracted over 8,300 people, while many more congregated downtown. After the Canucks lost 3–2, a crowd of between 40,000 and 70,000 people gathered downtown. Fighting and looting ensued, with police using tear gas to clear the area. The riot led to over 190 injuries, $1.1 million in damages, and charges being brought against over 100 people.

In response to these riots, investigations were examined by the Vancouver Police Department, the City of Vancouver, the Vancouver Fire Department, and other organizations. These reports found concerns including the lack of a sufficient traffic plan, issues with the communication equipment used by first responders, limited police visibility during the early stages of the gathering, lack of training in crowd control, and the availability of alcohol purchases from privately owned stores. An independent review of the 2011 riot found that the recommendations from 1994 were largely followed.

In Boston, there was no viewing party at TD Garden for the game. This was because of concern by the police that the additional people could lead to increased crime. Previous championships by the Boston Celtics, Boston Red Sox, and New England Patriots had led to widespread vandalism and three fatalities.

=== Fan zone ===
City organizers had set up a two-block long fan zone on six-lane Georgia Street near the Rogers Arena. Two big screen TVs were set up for fans to watch the game. Temporary fences and gates were set up to provide checkpoints where police could control access to the area and check for alcohol (which police generally poured out when found). Following recommendations stemming from the 1994 riot, all liquor stores in the area were closed earlier in the day. Crowds had been generally well-behaved in the fan zone for the previous six games, with roughly 70,000 attending each event. Similar though smaller events had been very successful during the 2010 Winter Olympics. For the final game, an estimated 100,000 people crowded into the area, and people found ways to enter the zone without being checked for alcohol. Planned corridors to allow movement of emergency vehicles became impassable.

=== Game ===
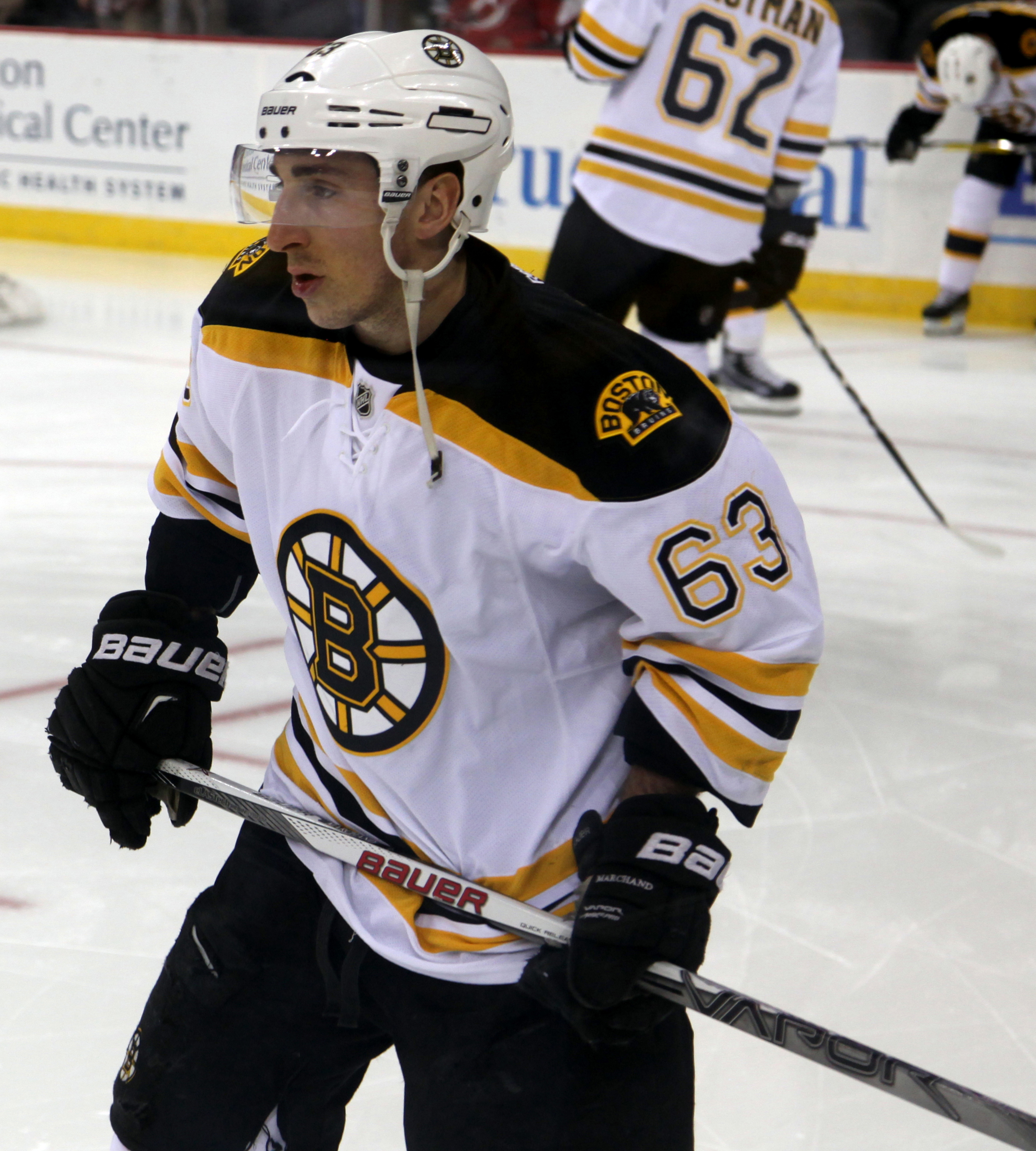
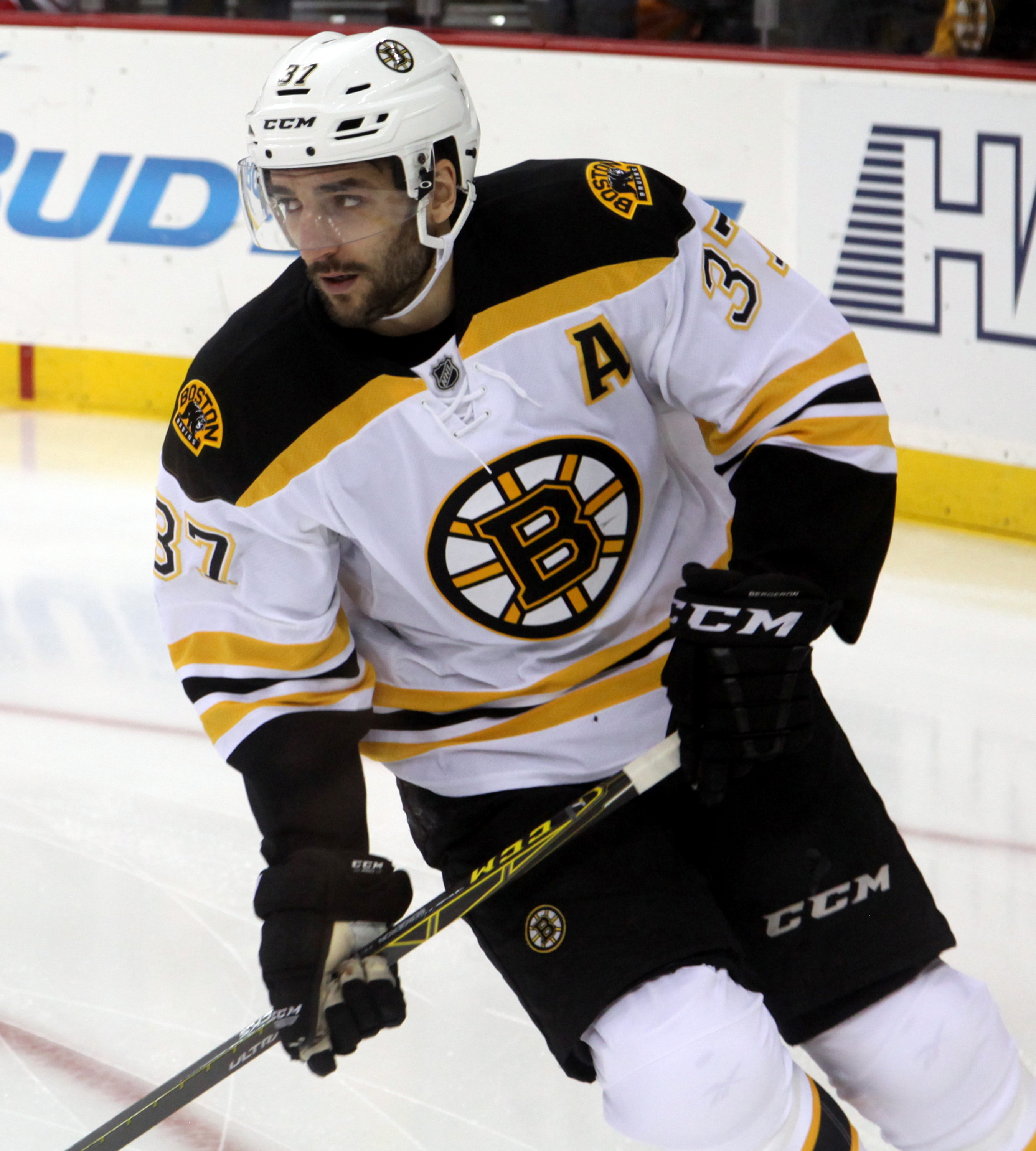
Brad Marchand and Patrice Bergeron each scored two goals in game seven.

The Vancouver Canucks and the Boston Bruins participated in the 2011 Stanley Cup Final, which was the culmination of the 2011 Stanley Cup playoffs. The series was played over seven matches, with the winner being the team that won four games. After the conclusion of the sixth game on June 13, 2011, the series was tied 3–3. The seventh game was played at the Canucks' home arena, Rogers Arena, as they had the better regular season record.

The game was played on Wednesday, June 15, 2011, and the puck dropped just after 5 pm PDT. Bruins goaltender Tim Thomas made 37 saves as Boston shut out Vancouver, 4–0, to win the Stanley Cup. Patrice Bergeron and Brad Marchand each scored two goals for Boston. Bergeron scored first at 14:37 in the first period, then had a shorthanded goal at 17:35 in the second. Marchand's first goal came at 12:13 of the second period; he then scored on an empty net late in the third. The Bruins outscored the Canucks 23–8 over the series. The win marked Boston's first championship since 1972. The series also marked both the Canucks' third appearance and loss in the Stanley Cup Final.

== Riot ==
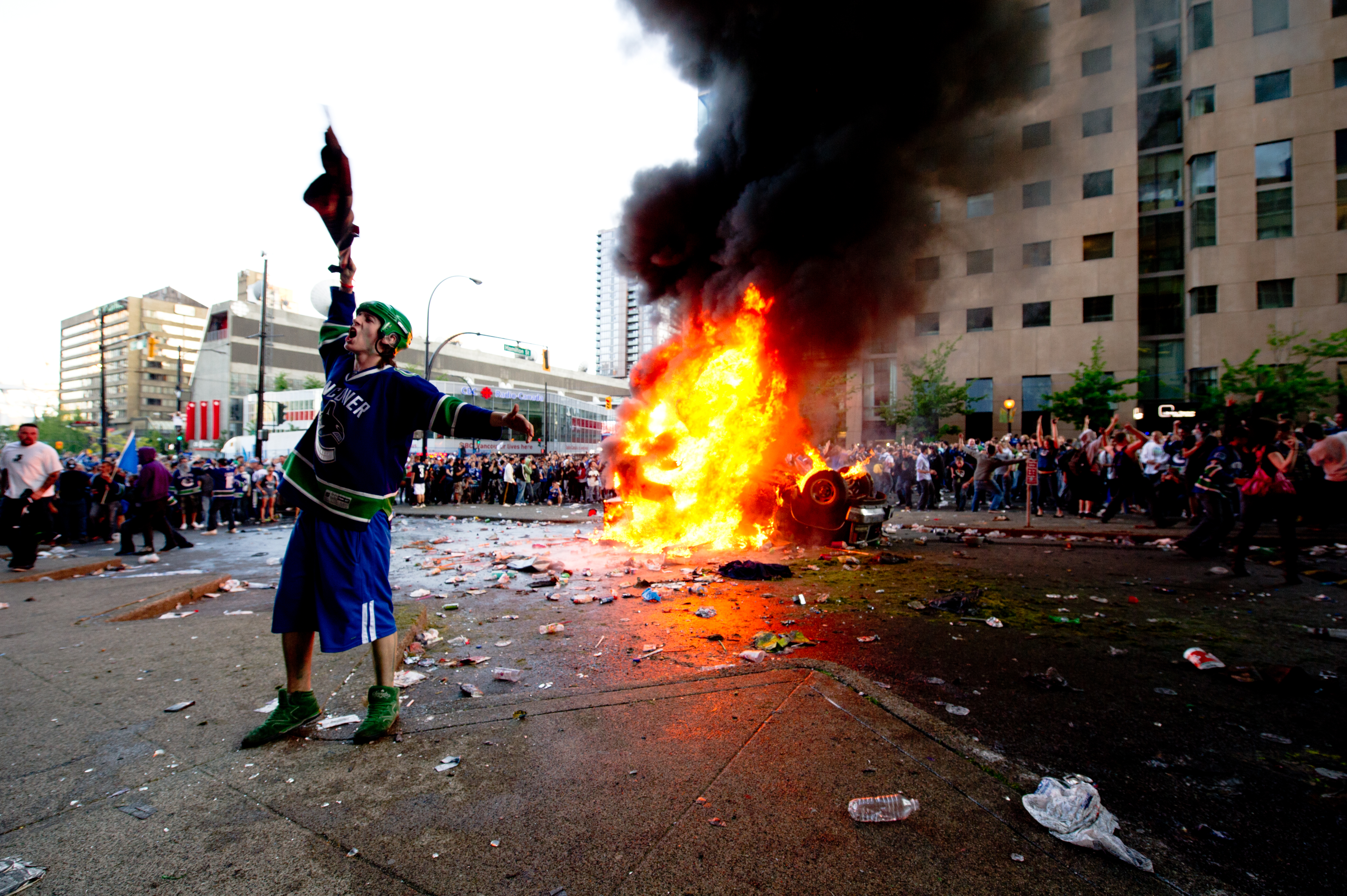
A rioter wearing a Canucks jersey cheers while a car burns, surrounded by a large crowd.

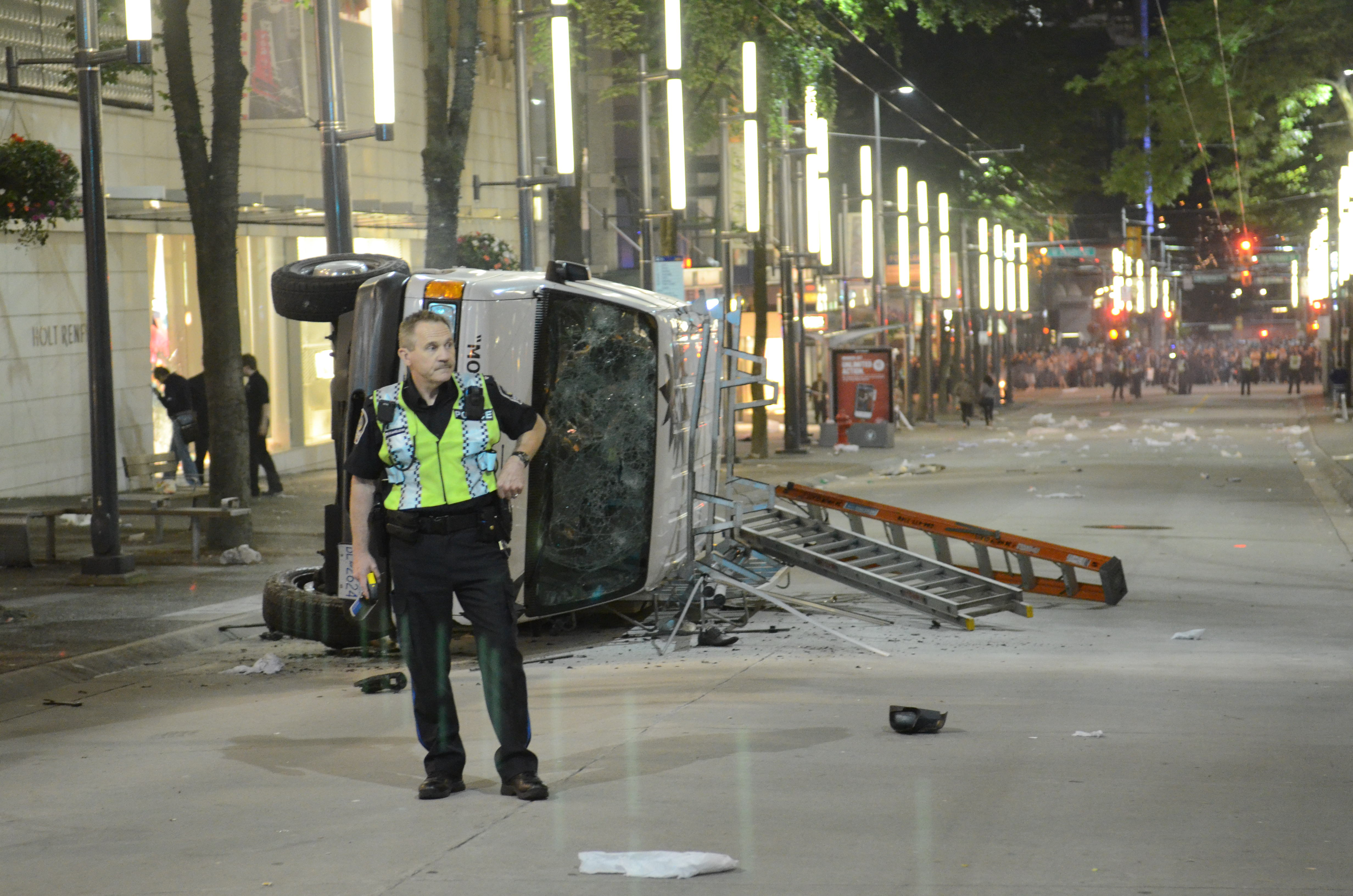
A police officer stands near an overturned van during the riot.

Trouble at the watch party began before the game had started. One of the entrances to the fan zone was removed, as the barricades were being breached. At 5:55, a five-man fight occurred in the fan zone. Thirty-five young people climbed onto the roof of a Budget Rent a Car building. These individuals started throwing bottles after Marchand's second goal for the Bruins, at which point the police department decided to remove them.

Around 7:18 pm, a fight with over 30 people took place. By 7:30, there was an increase in 911 calls about rioting, with disturbances including broken windows, 100 people on the roof of the Queen Elizabeth Theatre (which was showing the musical Wicked to a 1,900-person crowd), and looting of a Gucci store.

The riot began to take shape as the game came to a close at 7:45 p.m., with some spectators throwing bottles and other objects at the large screens in the viewing area. Boston Bruins flags and Canucks jerseys were set afire, and soon some rioters overturned a GMC Pickup in front of the main post office. Some porta-potties collapsed after people stood on top of them. People began jumping on the car that had been overturned, and sometime before 8:00, the car was on fire.

At 8:26, the police read the riot act and began to play a pre-recorded message which alerted the rioters that they were partaking in an illegal activity, and ordered them to leave the area. The police began using smoke bombs at 8:48. The SkyTrain system began displaying messages on electronic screens reading: "Due to the unstable situation in downtown Vancouver, we strongly advise customers NOT to travel downtown until further notice." Various stores began to be looted, including The Bay, London Drugs, Sears, and Sport Chek. At 10:30, the performance of Wicked ended, and patrons were asked to stay inside the theatre to avoid the riot. The riot ended around midnight, with the police using a helicopter to confirm that there were no outstanding areas of activity.

By the end of the night, around 100 arrests were made by the Vancouver police, including 85 for breach of peace, eight for public intoxication, and only eight for criminal code offenses such as assault and theft. Nearly 150 people were treated by hospitals for injuries sustained in the riot. By the next day, four people were still in serious condition. Dozens of people were treated for tear gas and pepper spray exposure. Vancouver General Hospital said they treated two major traumas, three stabbing victims, and one person with a head injury. St. Paul's Hospital treated more than 50 people for riot-related injuries. Of these, most had been exposed to tear gas and were released. Others had broken bones or cuts from broken glass. The hospital operated under "Code Orange", which was their mass casualty protocol. Their head doctor, Eric Grafstein, said that there were few injuries caused by police, especially compared to the 1994 riot, in which there were numerous baton strikes and dog bites. The BC Ambulance Service reported that they had transported a man who had jumped or fallen off of the Dunsmuir Viaduct, and that this man was in critical condition in the hospital.

== Aftermath ==
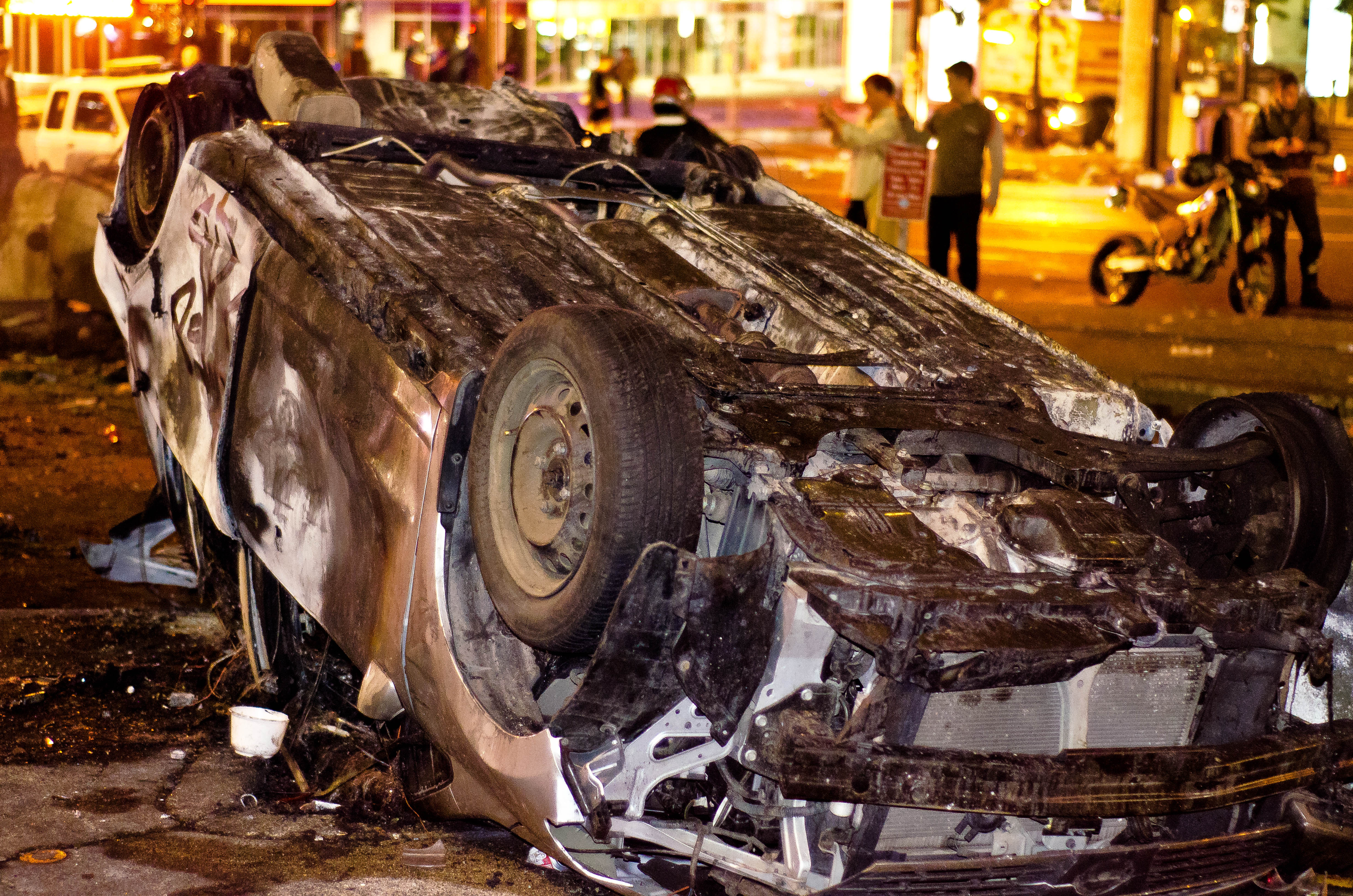
A car overturned and set aflame on the street during the riot

=== Response ===
In the immediate aftermath, Vancouver Mayor Gregor Robertson initially attributed the situation to "a small group of troublemakers". Vancouver Police Department Chief Jim Chu said that instigators appeared to be some of the same individuals involved in a protest on the opening day of the 2010 Winter Olympics, and that they came equipped with eye protection, gasoline and other tools. He called them "criminals and anarchists" who disguised themselves as fans. The idea that anarchists were involved in the violence was rejected by UBC political science professor Glen Coulthard and others in a Vancouver Sun article on June 24. "That this gets tagged as anarchist activity is just more of an assumption or bias that has been around for a long time," said Coulthard. "[A]narchists are a convenient scapegoat for the police to deflect responsibility for what happened," said another commentator. One critic indicated that authorities had made several mistakes in the planning for the crowd—among them allowing parked cars near the screens and leaving newspaper boxes nearby which could be used as projectiles. On June 20, Chu said "While we are still standing by that observation about the instigators, we are learning that most of the people that joined in the riot and that have now been charged represent a wider spectrum of young people, many of whom do not have criminal records."

Canucks general manager Mike Gillis claimed that the people responsible for rioting weren't their fans, saying "I think that would have happened whether we won or lost... When you're faced with thugs like that and people who are just prepared to punch other people in the face and think they're getting away with it, it's pretty hard to stop that. They're there for that purpose." Goaltender Roberto Luongo expressed a similar sentiment, stating that "those were not the real Vancouver fans that were doing that... I think it was isolated groups. It was tough to watch that something like that happened to the city." Captain Henrik Sedin showed appreciation for the people who cleaned up the city afterwards: "What happened with all the volunteers that came out, I think that shows more of what Vancouver is about than the night before."

Singer Michael Bublé, who attended the game, launched an ad campaign which encouraged people to identify guilty parties and to make their photographic evidence public. "They're trash, basically," he said, describing the rioters. "It was gutless and disgusting behaviour. And I'm grateful for the police and firemen and paramedics who put their lives on the line, because there were people who were so scared. And that mob mentality could have killed somebody."

An Angus Reid poll soon after the riot showed that 90% of British Columbia residents were disgusted by the events of the riot. In the same poll, two-thirds of respondents indicated that they were satisfied with how the police handled the riot. Over half of the respondents answered that they didn't want to see a ban on street parties in response to the riot.

=== Cleanup ===
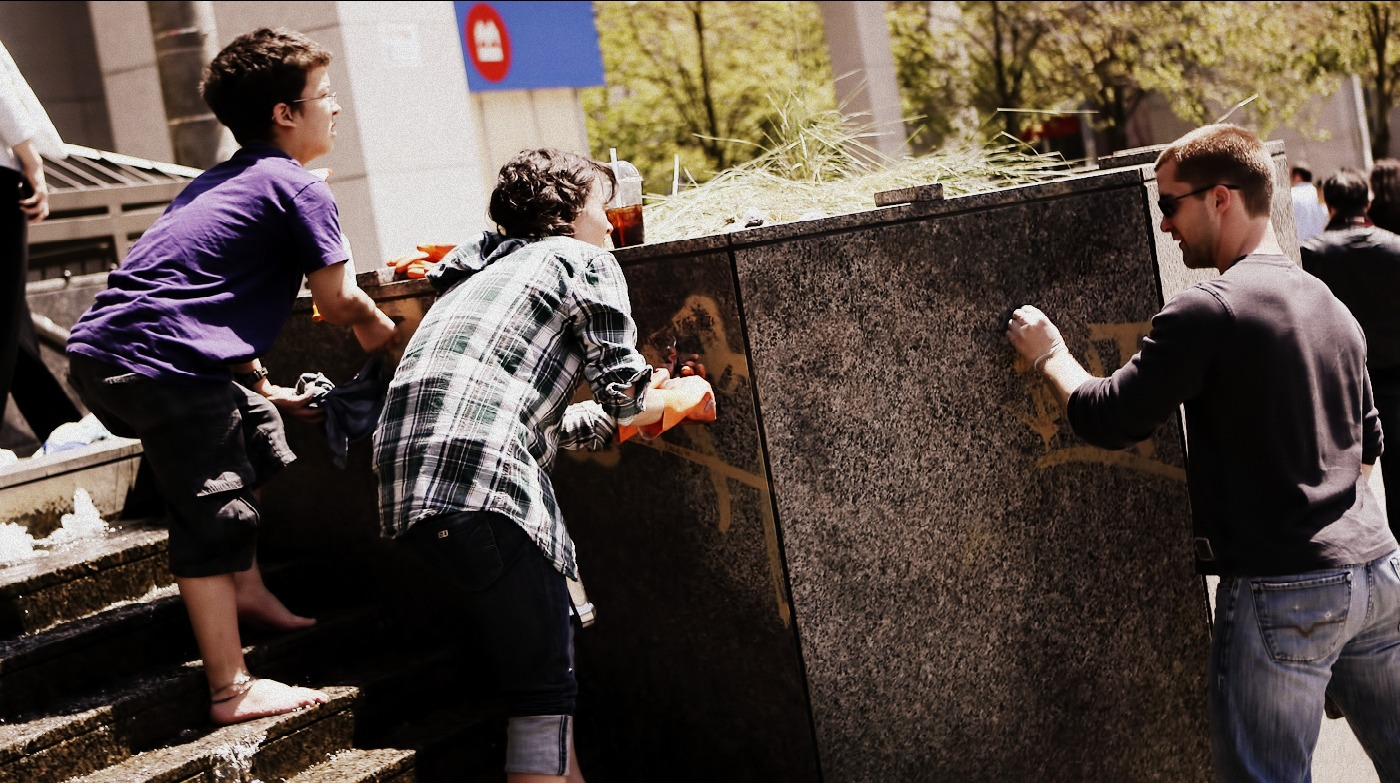
A group of volunteers clean spray paint off a wall

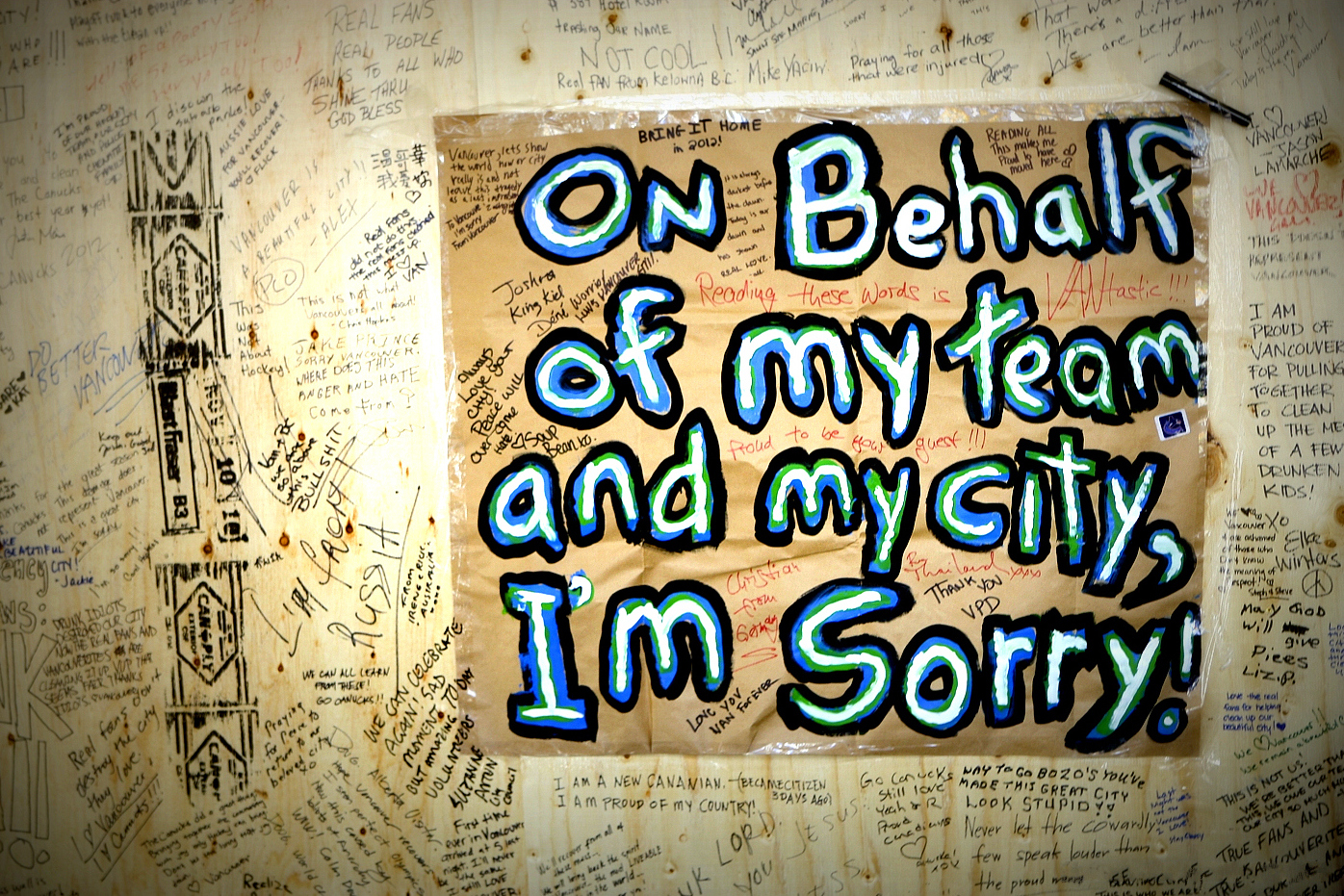
A sign on a wall with other messages written on the day following the riot

After the riot, an estimated 15,000 volunteers organized to clean up graffiti and other damage. Many volunteers organized via texting and social media sites such as Facebook and Twitter, and the Vancouver Police Department endorsed the efforts to help clean up. Streets were reportedly clean by 10 am, with volunteers having shown up with brooms and dustpans to clean the city. Boarded up windows were covered in apologies and defences of the city's reputation. In response, the Hudson's Bay Company, a major retailer in the area, hosted a free pancake breakfast in thanks.

In the days following the riot, hundreds of citizens gathered at the boarded-up storefront of the Hudson's Bay Company building—one of the hardest-hit properties—to leave messages of apology, sympathy, and support. This "Apology Wall" was documented in a detailed 1.49-gigapixel mosaic stitch consisting of 472 photos across seven boarded windows, capturing a permanent record of the city's collective catharsis.

=== Criminal prosecution ===
As many as 70 officers from eight different police agencies formed the Integrated Riot Investigation Team, tasked with sifting through hundreds of hours of video and other evidence to identify rioters. Several participants in the riots turned themselves in to police after their faces were broadcast on TV, including the person responsible for setting the first car on fire. More than 1,000,000 photos and over 1,000 hours of video recorded by citizens were sent to the Vancouver Police Department as evidence.

Insurance Corporation of British Columbia (ICBC) offered their facial-recognition software to the police in an attempt to aid in their criminal investigation of the riot. In 2012, the Information and Privacy Commissioner of British Columbia, Elizabeth Denham, ruled that police could not use the software without a warrant requesting the information.

By July 2013, police had recommended 1,204 criminal charges against 352 suspected rioters. In July 2015, over four years after the riots, the last two suspects were charged. By then, a total of 887 criminal charges had been laid against 301 suspects, 274 of whom pled guilty. Police stated that they would continue to act on any tips they are provided and future charges could be laid.

=== Social media ===
Social media played a role in broadcasting and documenting the riot. Soon after the start of the riot, the event trended on Twitter. Many people recorded images and videos of the damage as it unfolded. Experts have pushed back against the theory that social media was the cause of the riot. Christopher J. Schneider, a sociologist from the University of British Columbia said that the social media usage was "crowd-sourced policing or lateral surveillance, where citizens were surveilling other citizens".

Many of the photos and videos taken of the riot were posted to social media sites such as Facebook and YouTube. This led to an unprecedented community effort to identify and report rioters. The Vancouver Police department received more than one million photos and tips from civilians, a load that one sergeant described as "overwhelming". The department issued a statement asking the public not to take justice into their own hands, saying that there was "a growing danger that the tools of social media will be used to mete out vigilante justice". Police encouraged those who were caught committing crimes on video to turn themselves in to avoid facing a public arrest. A study published in 2012 by Schneider and Daniel Trottier found that online vigilantes could increase police surveillance in the future, and raised concerns that doctored photos and videos could waste police resources as they try to filter out bad evidence. Additionally, the online effort to identify rioters sometimes identified minors, whose names cannot be made public in legal proceedings.

An issue related to social media and the police investigation was that a number of people involved in the rioting were under the age of 18. Publishing the names of young offenders is forbidden by the British Columbia legal system. On social media, however, the sharing of images and videos and public online shaming can identify underage riot participants. Rioters who were identified online often faced backlash, with participants being fired from their jobs, removed from athletic teams, and in some cases, receiving violent threats. Seventeen year-old rioter Nathan Kotylak and his family left their home after receiving threats. In a statement, his lawyer said that those who participated in online campaigns against rioters were "becoming part of the mob mentality that swept through members of the crowd" during the riot. Schneider concurred, saying that "Many of the comments are horrific, threatening things that these people might not normally say... There is a profound disconnect between who we are online and in life. We are still learning how to be cyber citizens". Another individual, Brock Anton, who posted on Facebook about the damage inflicted by the riot, was the target of harassment online for his alleged role in the riot. A Facebook page with the name "Brock Anton Sucks Dick" was created, and a song called "The Ballad of Brock Anton" received over 65,000 views on YouTube. However, Vancouver police later revealed that Anton wasn't involved in any criminal activities and declined to charge him. Camille Cacnio, a University of British Columbia student who stole two pairs of pants during the riot, expressed concerns that the online backlash had gone too far. She claimed that she had lost her job, lost friends, and that online posters had encouraged directing donations away from the Enspire Foundation, a charity that she was formerly involved in, due to her actions.

=== Financial losses ===
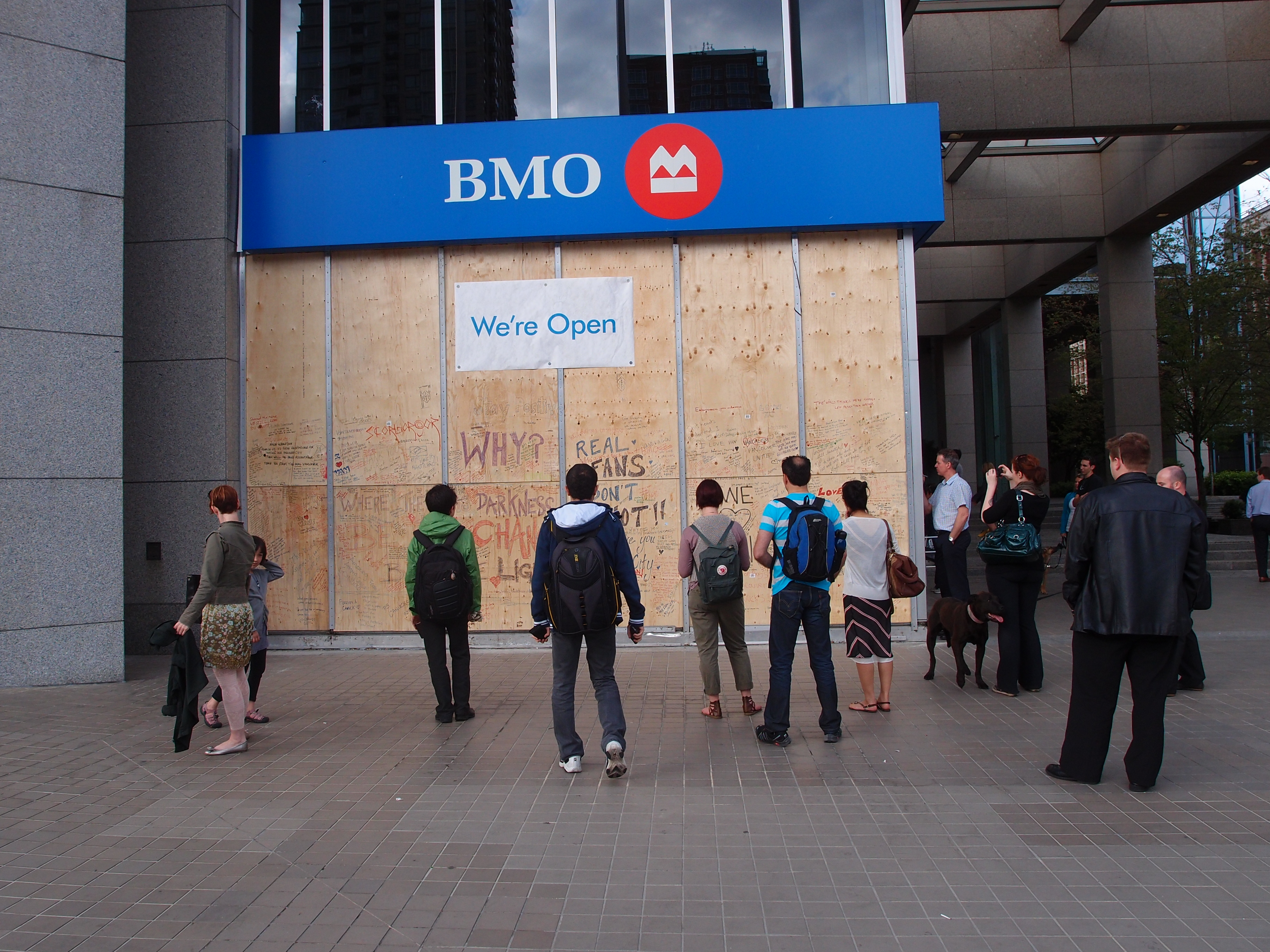
A BMO Bank branch remains open despite damages from the riots

CBC News reported that the destruction caused by the rioters was worse than the 1994 riot, which cost around $1.1 million in damages. In 2016, B.C.'s crown prosecutors estimated that the riots cost $9 million, with damages costing around $4 million, and extra staffing costs for prosecution totaling around $5 million. Several large-scale stores such as London Drugs, The Bay, Sears Canada and Future Shop were among many that were looted.

In 2016, the ICBC won a lawsuit against 82 rioters, in which the defendants were found jointly liable for damages inflicted to automobiles during the riot. Of the defendants, 37 settled with the insurer, 35 received default judgements, and 10 went to trial. Nine of those ten were found liable. Sean Yates was the only defendant represented by a lawyer, and was found to be not liable due to insufficient evidence against him. This was despite a video of him throwing a mannequin through the window of a burning car, which the judge compared to "kicking a dead horse" as the car was already destroyed.

=== Independent review ===
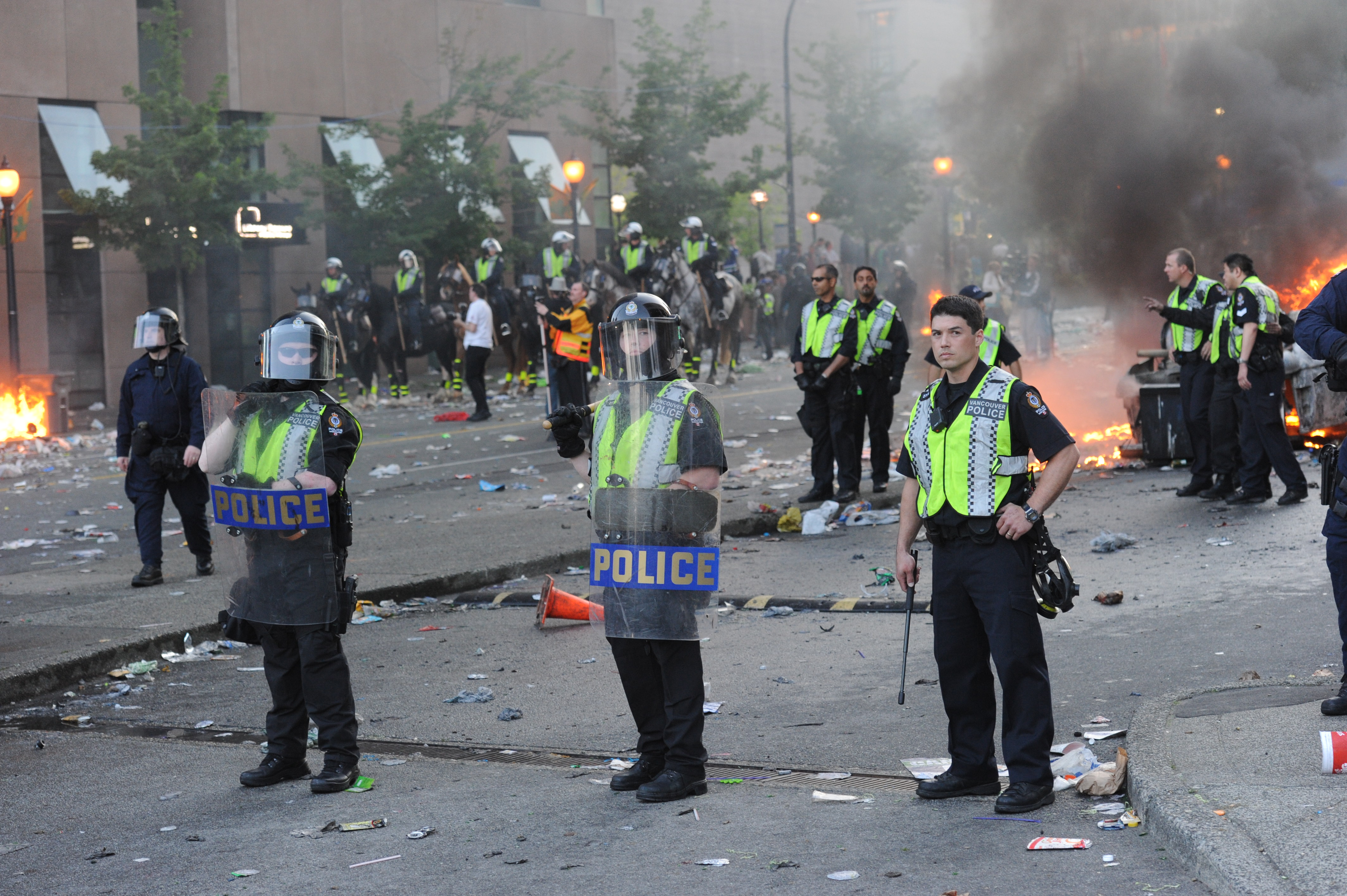
Multiple police officers stand in riot gear during the riots

An independent review commissioned by the province of British Columbia and the City of Vancouver released its 396-page report titled The Night the City Became a Stadium on August 31, 2011. This report labeled alcohol consumption as a primary cause of the riot. Additionally, the report concluded that the Vancouver Police Department's reinforcements arrived too late to control the crowd, although because the crowd had 155,000 people, it would be impossible for any sized police force to prevent the riot.

Vancouver tried to do a good thing and found itself in an almost impossible situation. There were too many people, not too few police. No plausible number of police could have prevented trouble igniting in the kind of congestion we saw on Vancouver streets that night.

— The Night the City Became a Stadium

The department had 446 officers at the riot, which increased to 928 by the end of the evening. The report laid out 53 recommendations for preventing a similar occurrence in the future, including the development of a regional framework for cooperation between emergency services in the event of a riot, and for TransLink to better control alcohol around the transit system. Additionally, the report found that a core group of 1,000 rioters were primarily responsible for the riot.

== Media coverage ==
The riots sparked intense media coverage and attention on the local, national, and international level. Local media coverage of the riots began almost immediately after the game ended, with the local CBC, CTV and Global BC stations all running news coverage of the riots, with CTV and CBC doing so from studios located in downtown Vancouver itself. CBC News Network started running live coverage in conjunction with its nationally broadcast evening news show The National, with one reporter calling in her reports from inside the riot.

Prominent publications such as The Atlantic, The Guardian, The New York Times and USA Today published editorials critical of the riots and its participants, as well as the city, noting the stark contrast between the Stanley Cup playoffs and the 2010 Winter Olympics. The Boston Herald provided coverage of the riots in addition to coverage of the Bruins' Stanley Cup celebrations, with other Boston media outlets providing their coverage of the riots.

During the event, photographer Ronnie Miranda captured a 2.11-gigapixel panorama of the Vancouver Canucks Fan Zone along Georgia Street at 5:46 p.m., just minutes before the riot erupted. The massive image, stitched from 218 individual photos taken over a 15-minute window, was hosted online to allow fans to tag themselves on Facebook, vying for social media tagging benchmarks. The high-resolution photo drew significant attention from the Vancouver Police Department, who used the image to assist in their investigation in identifying potential rioters. The image was utilized as the cover for the 396-page independent government review of the riot, titled "The Night the City Became a Stadium".

=== Kissing couple photograph ===
The "kissing couple" photograph by Richard Lam

During the riot, a photograph that depicted a young couple kissing while lying in the street during the riot, became an iconic image of the riots. This photograph, taken by Vancouver-based sports photographer Richard Lam, went viral on social media. Sports Illustrated called it "the most compelling sports image of the year". The photograph has been used worldwide in marketing campaigns, and is also used as the album cover of A Place for Us to Dream, a 2016 compilation album by the English alternative rock band Placebo.

At first, many viewers suspected the scene had been staged. Lam pushed back on this suggestion: "What you don't see in the frame is that twenty feet beyond is the mounted [police] squad, on horseback. I don't think they were in any mood for people to be playing around setting something up like this." The couple, who would be identified as Alexandra Thomas of Coquitlam, British Columbia, and Scott Jones of Perth, Western Australia, claimed that they were knocked down by the police's riot shields. Video evidence posted on YouTube later backed up their claims. In June 2016, it was reported that Thomas and Jones live in Perth, where they sleep under a poster copy of the photograph. As of 2021, the couple has remained together and are raising a family.

== See also ==
- Breach of the peace
- Collective effervescence
- Crowd psychology
- Disorderly conduct
- Hooliganism
- I'm Just Here for the Riot, a 2023 ESPN documentary on this riot
- List of incidents of civil unrest in Canada
- Public intoxication
