= 1994 Vancouver Stanley Cup riot =

1994 riot in downtown Vancouver, Canada, following an ice hockey game

Coordinates: 49°17′04″N 123°7′29″W

- Date: June 14, 1994
- Location: Downtown Vancouver
- Also known as: Vancouver riots
- Deaths: 0
- Injuries: 200 (1 critically)
- Property damage: $1.1 million ($2.11 million in 2025 dollars)

The 1994 Vancouver Stanley Cup Riot occurred in Downtown Vancouver, British Columbia, Canada, on the evening of June 14, 1994, and continued into the following morning. The riot followed game seven of the 1994 Stanley Cup Final in which the Vancouver Canucks lost to the New York Rangers. It was Vancouver's first riot since 1972, when the Rolling Stones American Tour 1972 led to confrontations between the police and 2,000 outside the Pacific Coliseum.

== The riot ==
After the NHL game ended, an estimated 50,000 to 70,000 individuals converged upon Downtown Vancouver. The gathering developed into a riot at Robson and Thurlow Street, after an accident involving a man who fell from telephone pole wires into the crowd below. The police, who were on bicycles, attempted to escort paramedics into the crowd. When members of the crowd attempted to take a bicycle from one constable, police retreated and warned the crowd to disperse. Shortly after the riot squad congregated on Thurlow St. on the West side, police fired tear gas into the crowd, causing people to run in all directions. Windows of many major retailers along Robson were broken, including an Eaton's department store which had more than 50 smashed. The storefronts were eventually guarded by a constable as police regained control of the streets.

Tear gas wafted through the open windows of West End residents that night. St. Paul's Hospital responded to the situation by placing guards at the emergency room entrance to prevent tear gas victims from entering, claiming there was nothing that could be done for them. Eventually, as reported in The New York Times, bowls with water were placed outside by the security guards for those suffering from tear gas. Total damage to the downtown core was estimated at $1.1 million Canadian dollars.

Subduing the crowd required the direct involvement of over 540 officers, of the Vancouver Police Department and the Royal Canadian Mounted Police. Numerous individuals were arrested and charged, and up to 200 people were injured.

== Aftermath ==
Ryan Berntt, a rioter who was shot in the head with a plastic bullet by police, causing a four-week coma and permanent brain damage, filed a civil suit against police and the City of Vancouver claiming excessive force. In 1997, he was found 75 percent liable for his own injuries, however, the British Columbia Court of Appeal ordered a new trial in 1999. In 2001, Berntt's civil suit was dismissed by the Supreme Court of British Columbia.

In New York City, although the celebrations marking the Rangers' first championship in 54 years were peaceful and there were no reports of violence or arrests, they were marred by the Vancouver riots. Rudy Giuliani, who became the city's mayor just five months before, NYPD Commissioner Bill Bratton, and Rangers President and General Manager Neil Smith said that the Rangers and people in New York City were in shock over the news of the riots and that the shockwaves of it had travelled to the city and put it on the highest alert. Bratton cancelled days off for the New York City Police Department on June 17, 1994, the day of the parade for the Rangers, as a precaution against what happened in Vancouver happening in New York City.

During their broadcast of the post-game celebrations following game seven, Hockey Night in Canada’s Ron MacLean said when the network broadcast scenes outside Madison Square Garden that the NYPD avoided a large-scale riot by "continuing to bolster their situation in anticipation of a wild night in Manhattan." In addition to the New York Times, other New York City news media, including the New York Daily News, New York Post, Staten Island Advance and New York radio and TV stations, sent reporters to Vancouver to cover the riots in that city while also reporting on the Rangers' celebrations in New York City.

Seventeen years later, the Canucks played the Boston Bruins in the Stanley Cup Final. They again lost in game seven, on June 15, 2011, resulting in a similar riot.

== In popular culture ==
The events of the riot were featured on reality television shows World's Wildest Police Videos, World's Most Amazing Videos and Maximum Exposure.

== See also ==
- 1993 Montreal Stanley Cup riot
- List of incidents of civil unrest in Canada
