= List of strikes in Canada =

Significant events in Canadian labour history

This is a chronological list of labour strikes in Canada and other significant labour-related events in the country's history.

== 1700s ==
- 1799 – After establishing fur trading post Greenwich House at Lac la Biche, workers refuse to proceed to Lesser Slave River because of lack of provisions. First known strike action in Canada.

== Early-mid 1800s ==
- 1803 – Seven men working for Peter Fidler at Lake Athabasca, Alberta refuse to stay on job unless wages are increased.
- ca. 1812 – Dock workers in St. John (NB) and Halifax organize a union.
- 1820 – Oxford House, Manitoba where Cree fur trade employees, without benefit of a formal union, go on strike demanding better pay.
- 1835–1845 – Shiners' War, Irish labour strife at Bytown (today's Ottawa).
- 1842 – In Quebec, T.M. Moore begins to publish People's Magazine and Workingman's Guardian, the first labour-oriented reform newspaper.
- 1842–1843 – Welland Canal Riot in which Irish immigrants fight each other for jobs. From 1842 to 1843, faction rioting occurs between Corkmen and Connaughtmen working on a canal in Broad Creek, Ontario. Small-scale strikes are common. When blacklisting and arrests under existing laws fail to halt labour unrest, the Board of Works secures passage by the government of the United Canadas of the 1845 Act for the Preservation of the Peace near Public Works, the first of Canada's regulatory acts that seeks to control Canadian canal and railway workers.
- 1843 – Lachine Canal strike where canal workers went on strike over poor wages
- 1844 – Toronto Typographical Union is formed. It still exists today as a local of the Communications, Energy and Paperworkers Union of Canada.
- 1849 – Saint John Labourers Benevolent Association is founded. It is the precursor to the International Longshoremen's Association in the city. At the time, there is friction between the anti-Catholic Orange Order and a wave of poor unskilled Irish immigrants, resulting in a July 12, 1849 riot in which 12 are killed. Labourers' Benevolent Association erects the "Labourers' Bell" in 1849 on the Saint John waterfront to enforce the ten-hour day.

== 1870s ==
- 1871 – Toronto Trades Assembly is formed. First central union body in Canada.
- 1872 – Nine Hour Movement - labour activists call for nine-hour day and 54-hour workweek.
- 1872 March 25 – The Toronto Typographical Union goes on strike against their employer, the editor of The Globe. Liberal Party leader George Brown was vehemently against the 9-hour day. Union activity then being a criminal offence, 24 members of strike committee are jailed for conspiracy. John A. Macdonald's Conservative government passes Trade Unions Act on June 14, legalizing trade unions.
- 1872 April 15 – The Toronto Trades Assembly organizes the country's first significant workers demonstration.
- 1872 September 3 – Ottawa unionists hold a 10,000-person-strong parade through the city. Prime Minister John A. Macdonald joins and gives a speech where he promises to abolish the sorts of laws that had put the Toronto printers in jail. Canadian Parliament names Labour Day (first Monday in September) a holiday in 1894, and now it is a world-wide holiday.
- 1873 – An initial attempt at establishing a national trade union centre is made by the founding of the Canadian Labour Union. It is dissolved in 1878.
- 1873 – Drummond Mine explosion at Westville, Nova Scotia kills 60 or 70. Considered Canada's first mining disaster.

== 1880s ==
- 1880 November 12 – Foord Pit coal mine explosion at Stellarton, Nova Scotia kills at least 44.
- 1880–1900 – Knights of Labor, formed in 1869 in Philadelphia, becomes active in Ontario.
- 1882 – Toronto Women shoemakers went on strike in five factories. This was one of the earliest strikes by Canadian women and was supported by male unionists.
- 1883 – The Trades and Labour Congress of Canada (TLC), a Canada-wide central federation of trade unions, is formed.
- 1885 February 10 – Vale Colliery mine explosion near Thorburn, Nova Scotia kills 13.
- 1886 – Mutiny among North-West Mounted Police (NWMP) constables at Edmonton over poor food and overcrowding. Mutineers arrested, taken to NWMP headquarters at Regina, are punished and/or driven from the force.
- 1887 – Mine explosion at Nanaimo, British Columbia kills 148.
- 1889 – Royal Commission on the Relations of Labour and Capital The commission, chaired at first by James Sherrard Armstrong, notes the many workplace injuries and deaths, and condemns working conditions in many workplaces. The commission recommends several changes to improve working conditions (the federal government does not act on them). In a hearing before the commission, Olivier-David Benoît makes a strong case about the conditions faced by workers in the boot and shoe industry.

== 1890s ==
- 1890 – Trades and Labour Congress of Canada calls for eight-hour day.
- 1891 – Nova Scotia - Springhill mining disaster. 125 miners die, some of them child laborers as young as 10 years of age.
- 1892 – BC and prairies - CPR trainsmen's and conductors' strike. Fought specifically over the issue of union recognition, workers triumphed over the most powerful railway corporation in Canada and its president W.C. Van Horne. confirmed the status of international brotherhoods as bargaining agents for employees of CPR and other Canadian railways.
- 1894 – Labour Day is made a federal public holiday.
- 1894 – Nationalist Party, BC's first labour party, founded. Its name arises from its pro-nationalization (public ownership) platform. It elects a Member of the Legislative Assembly (MLA) in 1894 and 1898 provincial elections - Robert Macpherson. Also elected MP George Ritchie Maxwell in 1896.
- 1898 – Canadian Socialist League (CSL) founded in Montreal. Garners strong support in BC. Its views published in Lardeau Eagle, whose publisher, 23-year-old Richard Parmater Pettipiece, goes on to be prominent BC socialist and labour official.

== 1900s ==
- 1900 – Parliament passes the Conciliation Act and establishes the federal Department of Labour
- 1900 – (by election) Arthur Puttee elected as the first Labour Member of Parliament (MP). Runs under the Winnipeg Labour Party label. Serves as MP 1900–1904.
- 1900 – Quebec shoe worker strike/lockout. Its resolution is said to be the first direct intervention in a labour conflict by Québec Catholic clergy. The strike/lockout was an important step toward the organization of unions for Catholics and of the Confédération des syndicats nationaux (Confederation of National Trade Unions), founded in 1921.
- 1902 May 22 – Coal Creek (BC) mine disaster kills 128.
- 1903 – Consolidated Lake Superior riot due to layoffs and unpaid wages.
- 1903 – Frank Rogers shot to death at picket line during strike at Canadian Pacific Railway (CPR), Vancouver.
- 1904 November 23 – Carbonada mine (near Morrissey, BC) - Coal mine disaster kills 14.
- 1904 – Socialist Party of Canada founded by E.T. Kingsley, R.P. Pettipiece and others of the earlier Canadian Socialist League. The Western Clarion becomes its official organ. The Socialist Party elects MLAs in BC, Alberta and Manitoba, before disbanding in 1925 (reborn in 1931 as the SPC (WSM), which exists today).
- 1906 – Thomas Belanger and Francois Theriault are shot to death during a strike at Maclaren Company pulp mill at Buckingham, QU.
- 1906 – Industrial Workers of the World (IWW), formed in Chicago in 1905 and then came to BC. Founding convention of BC branch in 1906. Western Federation of Miners (WFM) instrumental in its early efforts.
- 1906 – IWW Lumber Handlers Union No. 526, composed primarily of Tsleil-Watuth First Nations people of Burrard, strikes in opposition to demands of longer hours and lower pay. First IWW strike in western Canada. Strike largely unsuccessful; only victories are in getting jobs back and having scabs fired.
- 1906 – Thunder Bay - the first strike at the Lakehead begins. Again and again, area workers band together to fight for wage increases, job security and non-discriminatory hiring practices.
- 1907 – Quebec Bridge, still under construction, collapses, killing 75, including 33 Mohawk steelworkers from the Kahnawake reserve near Montreal. (When being rebuilt, it collapsed again in 1916.)
- 1907 – IWW achieves majority control of the AFL-CIO unions in Nelson. (Just a couple of years later, it becomes Nelson's largest union and leads a successful fight for the 8-hour day and higher wages for city workers.)
- 1907 July 2 – Western Federation of Miners activist James “Big Jim” McGuire called miners at the Nipissing Mine property, Cobalt, Ontario out on strike. It grew into a near-general strike. IWW organizer Robert Roadhouse held nightly rallies in the Cobalt town square, which attracted large crowds. (These rallies were the first of the Wobblies’ “free speech” rallies, later held also in San Francisco and Seattle.) Some smaller mines signed contracts with the miners, but the largest mine never did. Blacklists and other troubles broke the strike in the end. The area's radical labour heritage was later shown with the election of Angus MacDonald in 1920.)
- 1907 August 28 – At Cobalt (Ontario), an IWW member is killed when scabs overload a charge at the mine.
- 1907 Sept. 7-8 – Vancouver Labour Day march by unionists leads to anti-Asian-immigration riot. Chinatown and Japantown are attacked, causing property damage and numerous injuries.
- 1907 – Rise of industrial unionism pre-World War I involves the IWW and other workers as well. In Quebec in 1907, workers in the textile sector, predominantly Francophone or Jews, organize industrial unions and conduct strikes.
- 1907 – Some miners in Edmonton (Strathcona Mine) gain eight-hour day. (United Mine Workers of America achieved eight-hour day in 1898.)
- 1909 – Alberta provincial election: Charles O'Brien, of the Socialist Party of Canada, elected by coal miners in the Rockies.
- 1909 October 5 – Wellington Collieries cave-in at Extension, BC (near Ladysmith) kills 32.
- 1909 – Prince Rupert (BC) - 123 IWW men walk off sewer construction worksite.
- 1909 – Victoria IWW branch signs up 300 men employed in street construction and leads them out on strike. That same year, Victoria IWW calls for a general strike to demand release of McNamara brothers, arrested for the bombing of the Los Angeles Times building.
- 1909 – Vancouver Free Speech Fight, wherein the IWW, supported by the Socialist Party of Canada, refuses to give in to demands by mayor and police that labourites not hold open-air rallies and meetings. Prominent U.S. leftist speakers Lucy Parsons and Elizabeth Gurley Flynn also assist. (Vancouver Free Speech Fight re-fought in 1911 and 1912.)

== 1910s ==
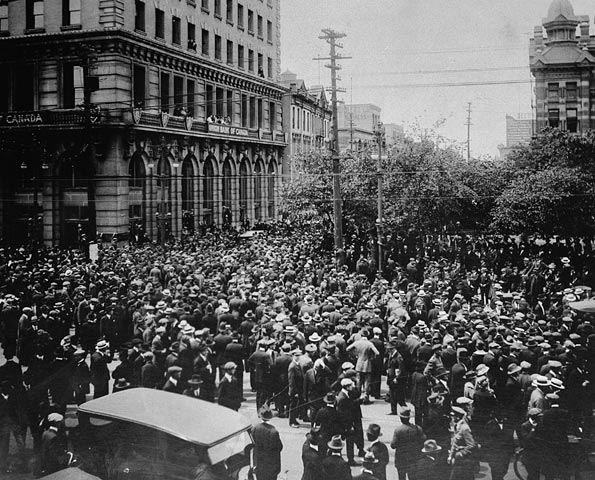
The Winnipeg general strike in 1919

- 1910 December 9 – Bellevue mine disaster at Bellevue, Alberta kills 30 miners.
- 1911 – Vancouver Free Speech Fight is re-fought in 1911 (and again in 1912). 1911 result: outdoor meetings allowed on certain streetcorners.
- 1911 December 23 – At Nelson, BC, John LeTual and Caleb A. Barton are murdered while organizing for Industrial Workers of the World (IWW).
- 1911 23 April – Nova Scotia -- An undercover private detective who had infiltrated the local coal miners union to sabotage union activity shot one man dead and fatally wounded another. J. B. McLachlan, later a prominent Cape Breton Communist, was present and survived by taking cover behind a desk.
- 1912 – IWW, assisted by Socialist Party of Canada, conducts successful fight for free speech in Vancouver. R.P. Pettipiece, former Alberta/BC newspaperman and now prominent BC labour radical, arrested. IWW calls for a general strike and advocates "direct action up to and including sabotage".
- 1912 – Edmonton sewer ditch diggers, organized by IWW, strike for fair wages.
- 1912 – Alberta Federation of Labour formed, the first provincial union central body in Canada. Special prominence given to delegates of the United Farmers of Alberta, in a show of worker-farmer solidarity.
- 1912–1914 – Great Coal Strike on Vancouver Island, aka Vancouver Island War. Miner Joseph Mairs sentenced to 18 months prison term, dies in jail of internal illness, having received no medical attention. He is 21 years of age. A memorial cairn stands in Ladysmith, British Columbia.
- 1913 – Thunder Bay (Port Arthur and Fort William) - conductors and motormen of the civic railway (streetcar service) go on strike. Violence on both sides. The 1913 strike is the last major outburst of labour violence in Thunder Bay prior to World War I.
- 1913 – Social Democratic Party activist Richard Rigg elected to Winnipeg city council.
- 1913 – New Brunswick Federation of Labour formed, the second in Canada after Alberta's.
- 1914 – S.S. Newfoundland sealing disaster - abandoned on ice floes for two nights, 78 sealers perish.
- 1914 – St. John street railway strike
- 1914-1932 – Welland Ship Canal construction claims lives of more than a hundred workers. Workers suffered 137 documented deaths between 1914 and 1932.
- 1914 April 28 – The Cobalt Miners’ Union,in Cobalt, Ontario, helped force the Legislative Assembly of Ontario to pass the Ontario Workmen’s Compensation Act — the first Canadian statute designed to provide benefits, medical care, and rehabilitation services to those who suffer workplace injuries.. April 28 is now commemorated worldwide as Workers Memorial Day.
- 1914 June 19 – Alberta - Hillcrest mine disaster. 189 workers killed. The worst coal mining disaster in Canadian history.
- 1914 July 1 – In Lac La Biche, Alberta, outspoken socialist and Wobblie Hiram Johnson is killed in a brutal knife and axe attack. He had written how his neighbours abhorred his politics. His murder is pinned on James Rowan and W.E. Barrett, two IWW organizers active in Edmonton who discovered Johnson's body. Their legal defence depletes the resources of the Edmonton IWW. The charges are eventually dropped, and the two men are instead sentenced to six months hard labour for vagrancy. Rowan goes on to write The I.W.W. in the Lumber Industry (1919).
- 1914 August 20 – In Vancouver, Clarke Wallace Connell (of the IWW) dies from abscess on the brain while in police custody.
- 1915 – Social Democratic Party activist Richard Rigg elected to Manitoba legislature. He has backing from the Labour Representation Committee. (He resigns in 1917 to run unsuccessfully for House of Commons.) Sitting MLA Fred Dixon is re-elected, with backing from the LRC.
- 1916 – Hamilton machinists' strike
- 1916 – Second Quebec Bridge Collapse, killing 13 workers. The work was being done to rebuild after the 1907 disaster.
- 1917 – The Canadian Labour Party is founded on the initiative of the Trades and Labour Congress of Canada.
- 1917 July 25 – Dominion No. 12 Colliery mine explosion at New Waterford, Nova Scotia kills 65.
- 1918 September 24 – Federal government outlaws the IWW by an Order in Council. IWW is soon partly replaced by One Big Union.
- 1917-1920 – Left-wing faction of the Socialist Party of Canada (SPC), known as the "Impossibilists", are arrested for sedition. In 1918, the federal government bans the SPC's journal, the Western Clarion. The Red Flag replaces the Clarion but then it too is suppressed the following year. By 1920, government repression against the SPC eases.
- 1918 – Ontario machinists strive for common wages, eight-hour day, and improved work conditions across the province. Hold first provincial convention of machinists in Toronto in July 1918.
- 1918-1925 – Canadian Labor Revolt, series of strikes aimed at revolution, at least in theory, sweep across Canada.
- 1918 – Vancouver general strike, Canada's first general strike, is sparked by the shooting death of Albert "Ginger" Goodwin.
- 1918 – Protection Island (BC) mining disaster; 16 are killed when the hoisting cable frays on a mine shaft elevator.
- 1918 – Dominion Labor Party (DLP) is founded as a successor to the moribund Canadian Labour Party (CLP). DLP becomes a powerful political force in Alberta and Manitoba.
- 1919 – Western Labor Conference in Calgary votes to found the One Big Union on June 4.
- 1919 – Winnipeg general strike, May 15-June 26. Two shot dead by police.
- 1919 – General strikes in Vancouver, Toronto, Calgary, Edmonton, Victoria, Brandon, Amherst (NS). The 1919 Vancouver strike, in sympathy with Winnipeg, is the longest general strike in Canadian history.
- 1919 – Alberta Coal miners at Drumheller and elsewhere struck for recognition of the OBU union as their union.
- 1919 – Labour unrest in Montreal.
- 1919 – Mathers Royal Commission on Industrial Relations releases its report shortly after end of the Winnipeg General Strike.
- 1919 – United Farmers of Ontario-Labour Party coalition government comes to power in Ontario. (not re-elected in 1923).

== 1920s ==
- 1920 – Labour scores wins in Manitoba. STV is adopted to elect Winnipeg MLAs and city councillors. Four labour-oriented MLAs elected in Winnipeg 1920, three of them doing time in prison for leading the General Strike. Nine DLP MLAs elected across Manitoba. 1920 Winnipeg city election elects 3-5 Labour councillors.
- 1920 – Independent Labour Party forms in Manitoba. Many Dominion Labour Party MLAs move to the ILP.
- 1920 – Five Labour MLAs elected in coal-mining parts of Nova Scotia - Cumberland: Archibald Terris; Cape Breton: Joseph Steele, Arthur R. Richardson, Forman Waye and D.W. Morrison.
- 1920 – Angus McDonald, a carpenter, elected in Temiskaming (northern Ontario) as Independent MP. Proponent of revolutionary industrial unionism (One Big Union). Re-elected in 1921. Riding abolished prior to 1925 election.
- 1921 – 1921 Alberta general election saw United Farmers of Alberta (UFA) elected to government. Four Labor MLAs elected in Alberta. The post of Minister of Labor is given to Labor Party MLA Alex Ross. Labour MLA Philip Christophers is elected by One Big Union coal miners.
- 1921 May – Communist Party of Canada is founded. It is the most important single force in the labour movement throughout the 1920s. It elected its first city alderman in 1927 in Winnipeg, its first MLA in Manitoba in 1936 and its first MP (Dorise Nielsen) in 1940.
- 1921 – Canadian Labor Party revives under James Simpson. (Dominion Labor Party remains its counterpart in southern Alberta.)
- 1921 – Canadian federal election elects two important labourites – J. S. Woodsworth in Winnipeg under the Independent Labor Party label, and William Irvine in Calgary under the Dominion Labor Party label. (Irvine was popular among both city workers and UFA voters.) Calgary also elects Joseph Tweed Shaw (backed by both the UFA and the DLP). Woodsworth, Irvine, United Farmers of Ontario MP Agnes Macphail, and others participate in the Ginger Group, a leftist caucus in the House of Commons.
- 1922 – Raid on Dominion Coal Company's store at Sydney, NS. Thirteen men sentenced to two or three-year prison sentences. (A company store was similarly pillaged in the 1995 film Margaret's Museum based on Sheldon Currie's novel The Glace Bay Miners' Museum.)
- 1922-1925 – Cape Breton Labour Wars for recognition of the United Mine Workers of America as miners' bargaining agent. Peaked with the murder of William Davis and the "Battle of Waterford Lake" (see 1925). Ended with UMWA being recognized as workers' bargaining agent.
- 1923 – Bloody Sunday (1923), police violence during a steelworkers' strike for union recognition in Sydney, Cape Breton Island, Nova Scotia
- 1924 – Woodsworth, Irvine, UFA MPs and other progressive MPs form the Ginger Group in the House of Commons to fight on behalf of labour and social advances.
- 1925 – New Waterford, Nova Scotia - Company police kill coal miner Bill Davis and wound many others at a demonstration during a major strike at the British Empire Steel and Coal Company (BESCO), formerly Dominion Coal Company. Davis Day is established in memory of Bill Davis. About 2000 soldiers are deployed against the strike, the largest peacetime deployment of the Canadian Militia for an internal conflict since the North-West Rebellion of 1885. "Battle of Waterford Lake" occurs on June 11, 1925. The defeat of the New Waterford strikers is said to end the labour revolt that started in 1918.
- 1925 – Drumheller coal miners went on strike. Mine operators with assistance from the Alberta Provincial Police weakened picket lines. The violence peaked on June 26, with a violent melee. Strike broken, but angry miners formed the Mine Workers' Union of Canada (MWUC). (Later that year three miners died at the Kirkpatrick mine near Drumheller.)
- 1926 – Labour elects four MLAs after Alberta adopts proportional representation (STV) to elect MLAs in Edmonton and Calgary. CLP's Lionel Gibbs is elected in Edmonton; DLP's Fred White and Independent-Labour candidate Robert Parkyn elected in Calgary. Use of STV to elect MLAs produces election of a Labour Party or Co-operative Commonwealth Federation (CCF) MLA in Edmonton every election from 1926 to 1955, except 1935 and 1940. Under STV, a Labour/CCF MLA elected in Calgary in 1926, 1930, 1944 and 1948. After change to first-past-the-post voting in 1956, no CCF/New Democratic Party (NDP) MLA is elected in Edmonton until 1982, in Calgary not until 1986.
- 1928 – Ontario - Hollinger gold mine disaster. 39 are killed by fire in the mine.
- 1929 – Death (suspected murder) in Thunder Bay of Finnish-Canadian union organizers Rosvall and Voutilainen.

== 1930s ==
- 1930s – Activism by unemployed. Relief at time required some work. That gave unemployed the power to strike. Free time gave them opportunity to hear street corner orators, march and protest, picket and protest, even occupy government buildings and lunch rooms.
- 1930 – Workers' Unity League, an organization of industrial unionism, is formed at the Toronto labour union conference. Harvey Murphy and Thomas Ewen are early leaders.
- 1931 – S.S. Viking ship explosion kills 28 sealers and members of a film crew.
- 1931 – Riot of unemployed in Calgary after Calgary police arrest a labour speaker.
- 1931 – Estevan riot. RCMP officers shot four strikers dead: Peter Markunas, Nick Nargan, Julian Gryshko and Mike Kyatick. Labour activist Annie Buller imprisoned.
- 1932 – Co-operative Commonwealth Federation (Farmer-Labour-Socialist) party founded in Calgary.
- 1932 – Edmonton Hunger March in December. A demonstration by struggling workers and farmers is repressed by billyclub-wielding police, some on horseback. Subsequently, police raid the Hunger March headquarters. 27 leaders and activists arrested.
- 1932 – Crowsnest Pass coalminers' strike -- "Great Pass strike of 1932" conducted by Mine Workers Union of Canada. Lasted seven months. Ended mostly in failure but heightened class consciousness (see next item).
- 1933 – Blairmore, Alberta, in the Crowsnest Pass area, elects a city council of socialist activists. Re-elected to 1939.
- 1933 – Stratford General Strike. Members of the Workers' Unity League are prominent. Military units equipped with machine guns and armored cars (or tanks) arrive to face off against the picketers.
- 1933 – The Relief Camp Workers' Union (RCWU) is formed by residents of Depression-era government relief work camps. It is an offshoot of the Workers' Unity League, the Communist Party of Canada's trade union.
- 1934 – Canadian League Against War and Fascism founded at Toronto in October, amid fears of rise of Fascism and Nazism in Europe. A.A. MacLeod was important in its founding. (Renamed as the Canadian League for Peace and Democracy in 1937; declared illegal and disbanded in 1940).
- 1935 – On-to-Ottawa Trek, protest march by unemployed from Vancouver eastward. It is stopped at Regina where it is dispersed by police in the July 1 "Regina Riot", with mass arrests and loss of life (Nick Shaak beaten to death by club-wielding RCMP; plainclothes policeman Charles Miller is killed).
- 1935 – Battle of Ballantyne Pier (1935 Vancouver dockers' strike). 1000 protesters, members of the Vancouver and District Waterfront Workers' Association, under influence of the Workers' Unity League; march towards Ballantyne Pier to prevent scabs from unloading ships in the harbour. Upon arriving at the pier they are ambushed by the Vancouver police, BC Provincial Police, and RCMP who had been hiding behind boxcars. Battle of Ballantyne Pier contributed to the creation of the International Longshore and Warehouse Union.
- 1935 – Congress of Industrial Organizations formed to pursue formation of industrial unions that would cover all workers in a plant, as opposed to craft unions. Many former WUL leaders and activists were prominent in the CIO.
- 1935 – R.B. Bennett's federal government passes Employment and Social Insurance Act and the country’s first national unemployment plan. (This comes too late, and 1935 election is a defeat for Bennett and the Conservatives.)
- 1935 – Galt Mine No. 8, Coalhurst, Alberta suffered explosion. Sixteen were killed.
- 1936 – Corbin Mine strike, southern BC near Alberta-BC border. Several strikers sentenced to prison terms. One of them, David Lockhart, dies of cellulitis while in prison.
- 1937 – Ragpicker's Strike (French: grève de la guenille), 25-day strike involving more than 5,000 female textile workers in Montreal. Notable for cooperation between previously isolated French-Canadian and Jewish workers, and for defying the Padlock Law used to persecute trade unionists.
- 1938 – Bloody Sunday, culmination of "sitdowners' strike" in Vancouver (unemployed workers' protests)
- 1938 December 6 – Princess Pit rake disaster at Sydney Mines, Nova Scotia kills 21.
- 1938 – Blubber Bay (Texada Island, BC) strike. Workers belong to recently founded International Woodworkers of America (IWA). Local union leader William Gardner dies after receiving savage beating and kicking from BC provincial policemen.
- 1939 – Canada declares war on Germany. The Communist Party opposed Canada's participation in World War II as it was at that time - a fight between capitalist countries, and the government banned the party under the Defence of Canada Regulations of the War Measures Act.

== 1940s ==
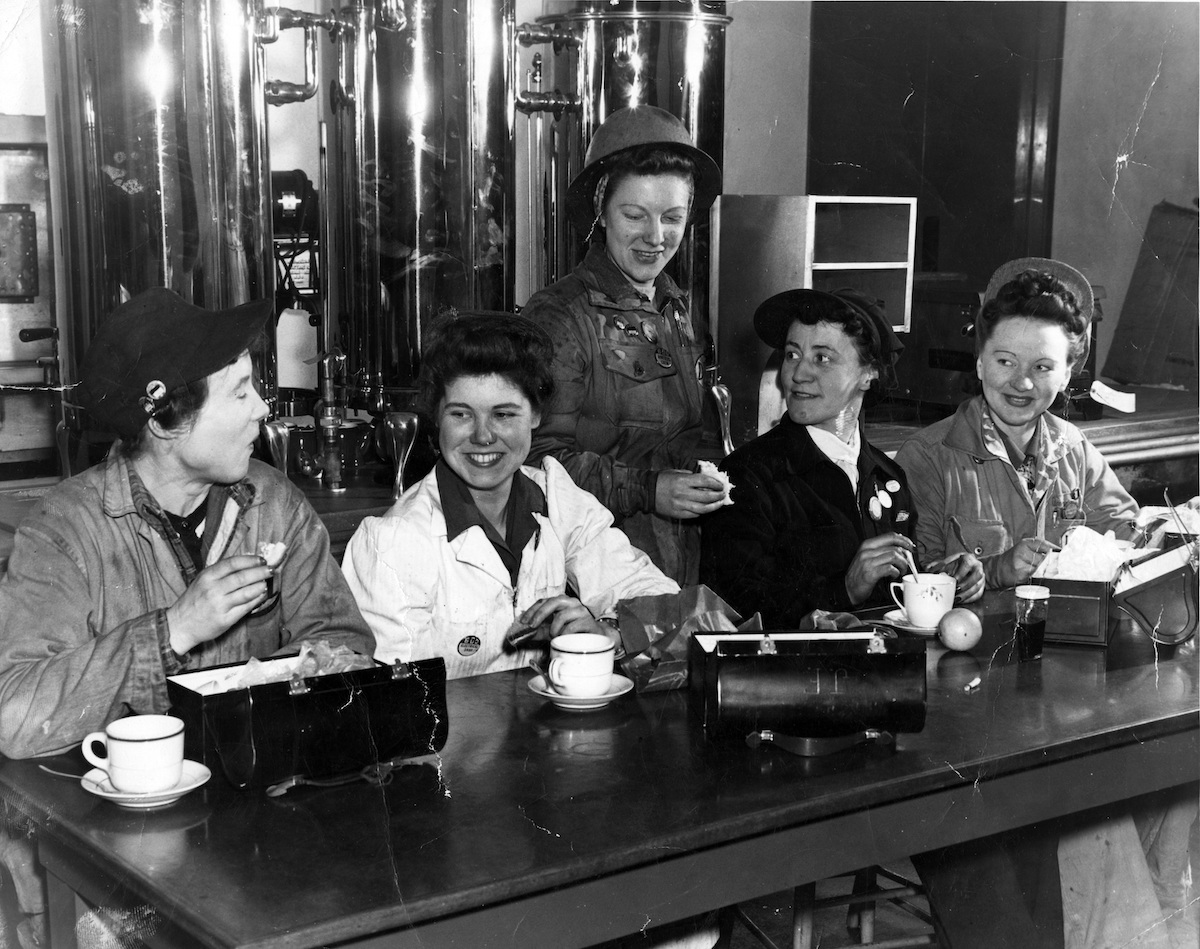
Female shop stewards at the Burrard Drydock, North Vancouver, British Columbia. The company hired more than 1000 women during World War II, all of whom were dismissed after the war to free up jobs for the men returning from armed service.

- 1940 – The Canadian Congress of Labour is founded. This follows the 1939 expulsion of Congress of Industrial Organizations (CIO) supporters from the Trades and Labour Congress of Canada as a result of pressure from the American Federation of Labor (AFL).
- 1940 – The first compulsory national unemployment insurance system in Canada is introduced in August; it comes into operation in July 1941.
- 1940 – Dorise Nielsen elected MP in the North Battleford (SK) riding under the United Progressive label. An active CCF-er she was secretly a member of the Communist Party, banned at the time. In 1943 she came out as Labour-Progressive Party member; her CCF riding association was disbanded as it held true to a United Front project. (Nielsen was the third woman to serve in the House of Commons.)
- 1940 – Coalminer Clarence Gillis of the Co-operative Commonwealth Federation party elected as MP in Cape Breton. He was the first CCF MP elected east of Manitoba.
- 1943 – Fred Rose (Labour-Progressive Party) elected MP for the Jewish working-class riding of Cartier (in Montreal). Re-elected in 1945. (see 1947)
- 1943 – A.A. MacLeod and J.B. Salsberg elected as Labour Progressive Party MPPs in Ontario. MacLeod served in the Legislature until 1951; Salsberg until 1955.
- 1944 – Tommy Douglas's CCF is elected to government in Saskatchewan. The CCF/NDP will govern that province 1944–1964, 1971–1982, 1991–2007.
- 1944 – Clarence Gillis first told the Mouseland fable, later made famous by Tommy Douglas.
- 1944 – Ontario Federation of Labour is formed by the industrial-union central body Canadian Congress of Labour.
- 1945 – Ford strike of 1945, three-month-long strike at Windsor, Ontario.
- 1946 – Introduction of the Rand formula
- 1946 – Montreal Cottons strike, Salaberry-de-Valleyfield, Quebec - As part of wave of textile worker unrest in Quebec, 3,000 mill workers at Montreal Cottons fought for 100 days to obtain a collective agreement that recognized their bargaining agent, Textile Workers Union of America (TWUA). Reached agreement after a riot on August 13.
- 1947 – Due in part to evidence given by Igor Gouzenko, Montreal-area Labour-Progressive Party MP Fred Rose is ousted from his seat after being found guilty of conspiring to steal weapons research for the Soviet Union. That all helped start a post-WWII Red scare in Canada and opened up the Cold War.
- 1949 – Aggregate union membership in Canada surpasses one million.
- 1949 – Royal Canadian Navy mutinies/no-work protests
- 1949 – Asbestos Strike in Asbestos, QU. 5000 miners on strike for three months against a foreign corporation at Asbestos and Thetford Mines. The bishop of Montreal, the newspaper Le Devoir, and several prominent intellectuals support the strikers. It is said to be one of the longest and most violent labour conflicts in Quebec history, and to have laid the basis for Quebec's Quiet Revolution.
- 1949 – Controversial U.S. labour unionist Hal C. Banks comes to Canada to assist in a labour dispute between rival shipping unions. The Canadian Seamen's Union is red-baited and attacked by Hal C. Banks and others, and replaced by the Seafarers' International Union. By 1950, the Canadian Merchant Navy has no more ships under its control.

== 1950s ==
- 1951 – Oil Workers International Union's Neil Reimer conducts unionization drive at Edmonton British-American (now Gulf) refinery. Manning's Social Credit government delays union certification and changes labour law so that signatures of majority of workers are no longer enough. When unionization vote held, it loses by ten votes. (see 1980)
- 1952 – First Peace Arch concert by musician and labour activist Paul Robeson
- 1952 January 14 – McGregor Mine explosion at Stellarton, Nova Scotia kills 19.
- 1956 – The Canadian Labour Congress is formed through the merger of the Trades and Labour Congress of Canada and the Canadian Congress of Labour.
- 1956 – Nova Scotia - Springhill mining disaster kills 39.
- 1956 – The Mine, Mill and Smelter Workers hold a national convention in Sudbury, Ontario, at which singer and activist Paul Robeson gives his first concert outside the United States since being placed under a travel ban by the United States government in 1950.
- 1957 – Murdochville miners' strike - 1000 copper miners struck for seven months at the Gaspé Copper Mines in Murdochville, Quebec. Three major bombings occur during the strike. One dynamite blast caused the death of miner Ange-Marie Kenney, on his way to work at the time. Said to be the most dramatic episode in the 12-year struggle that led eventually to the 1965 unionization of the Murdochville miners.
- 1958 – Nova Scotia - Springhill mining disaster kills 75. The first major event to appear in live television broadcasts (on the CBC).
- 1958 – Vancouver - Second Narrows Bridge disaster - bridge still under construction, collapses, killing 18. A diver drowns while searching for bodies. Bridge later renamed Ironworkers Memorial Second Narrows Crossing.
- 1958 – Newfoundland Loggers' Strike is conducted by the International Woodworkers of America

== 1960s ==
- 1960s – Canada adopts the 40-hour work week – five days/eight-hour day schedule.
- 1961 – The New Democratic Party (NDP) is founded as the successor to the Co-operative Commonwealth Federation (CCF) and establishes a formal relationship with the organized labour movement. A non-union affiliate of the NDP, the Woodsworth-Irvine Socialist Fellowship, based in Edmonton, carries on socialist education from 1962 to about 2000.
- 1961 – September 10, a Mine, Mill and Smelter Workers meeting at Sudbury Arena, regarding the union's controversial proposal to merge with the United Steelworkers, erupts into a riot.
- 1962 – Saskatchewan doctors' strike. A 23-day strike by doctors in the province ends with doctors accepting public healthcare with conditions.
- 1963 – Reesor Siding Strike in Northern Ontario. Picketline-crossing log suppliers shot eleven strikers, killing three.
- 1963 – The Canadian Union of Public Employees is formed from the merger of the National Union of Public Employees and the National Union of Public Service Employees.
- 1965 – Wildcat postal strike leads to the extension of collective bargaining rights to the majority of the public service. The Canadian Union of Postal Workers want the right to bargain collectively, the right to strike, higher wages and better management. They defied government policies and conduct an illegal, country-wide strike.
- 1967 – The international Mine, Mill and Smelter Workers merge with the United Steelworkers. Local 598 in Sudbury, Ontario is the only Mine Mill local in the world to reject the merger, instead continuing operations as an unaffiliated union organization until 1993.
- 1967 – Hydro-Quebec workers went on strike for six weeks, seeking better working conditions, higher salaries, and province-wide parity for office and technical employees. The workers engaged in rotating strikes across Quebec, and management rushed around in attempt to maintain services.
- 1968 – Air Canada agents in British Columbia begin work-to-rule over a dispute over the industrial relations department's bargaining methods.
- 1969 – Murray-Hill riot, Montreal police force on strike. FLQ, taxi drivers, and others take radical action.
- 1969 – Kent Rowley and Madeleine Parent founded the Confederation of Canadian Unions, as part of a wave of nationalist feeling among Canada's workers.
- 1969 – The Waffle movement is founded as a nationalist and pro-nationalization wing of the NDP. Its leaders were university professors Mel Watkins and James Laxer. It issued a Manifesto for an Independent Socialist Canada, called for a strong and united Canada and "the revitalization and extension of the labor movement [and] a fundamental democratization of our society."
- 1969 – New Democratic Party of Manitoba forms a minority government, in power until 1977.

== 1970s ==
- 1971 – Introduction of paid maternity leave through unemployment insurance.
- 1971 – Owner of La Presse (Montreal newspaper) locks out workers. Solidarity rally of 15,000 met with tear gas and beatings. University student Michele Gauthier, who suffered from asthma, dies of suffocation.
- 1972 – Quebec general strike lasted ten days. Around 300,000 workers on strike. One of the largest strikes in North American history. Theodore LeBlanc is killed when a car smashes into a pro-strike demonstration.
- 1972 – BC New Democratic Party is elected, stays in power until 1975.
- 1975 – Grace Hartman is elected as the second president of the Canadian Union of Public Employees, becoming the first woman to lead a major labour union in North America.
- 1976 – Canadian general strike: Day of Action (October 14) one-day general strike against Trudeau's anti-inflationary wages and price controls. More than one million workers stay home.
- 1978 September 15 – The Inco Strike of 1978 begins in Sudbury, Ontario. Workers remain on strike for almost nine months, until June 7, 1979.
- 1979 – The United Food and Commercial Workers is formed in June through the merger of the Amalgamated Meat Cutters and the Retail Clerks International Union.
- 1979 – Refusal of New Brunswick dock workers to ship nuclear materials to the then-military dictatorship in Argentina.

== 1980s ==
- 1980 – Canada wing of Oil, Chemical and Atomic Workers (formerly Oil Workers International Union) forms the Energy and Chemical Workers Union with Neil Reimer as its leader.
- 1981 – At Hibernia oilfield near Newfoundland, Ocean Ranger—an offshore oil platform—sinks, killing all 84 workers on board.
- 1981 – Ontario hospital workers went on an eight-day strike to improve hospital staffing levels and quality of care. The workers had no right to strike and were only permitted arbitration. The Ontario Supreme Court issued a back to work order, and 22 union members and three senior CUPE members were charged with contempt for defying the order.
- 1981 July 7-October 8 – Cape Breton coal strike of 1981. A bomb was detonated at a DEVCO mine, and DEVCO coal railcars are derailed at the company's Lingan mine in New Waterford. Strikers win a new contract.
- 1982 – Building trades separated from the provincial federations of labour (OFL, AFL, etc.) and adopted the name, the Canadian Federation of Labour.
- 1983 January-August – Province-wide Quebec general strike discussed. Militant trade unionists attempt to bring down the PQ premier René Lévesque due to likelihood that government would pass a right-to-work bill. The Centrale des syndicats du Québec called for a general strike starting on January 10. The situation escalates when teachers affiliated to the union (Centrale de l’enseignement du Québec (CEQ)) walk out on the school-year, closing many of Quebec's public schools. This strike began as an illegal walkout by members of a common front of the province's major unions in protest against legislation by the Lévesque government, which rolled back contract gains that public sector workers had made. In response, Lévesque forces through the right-to-work bill and additional back-to work laws that undercut local bargaining leverage and the right to strike.
- 1983 July-August – "Women Against the Budget" is formed to fight the 1983 BC budget and other actions taken by Bill Bennett's Social Credit government against working people. The broad-based umbrella organization of activist women helps create the BC Federation of Labour's Operation Solidarity and Solidarity Coalition. On August 10, 40,000 rally at Vancouver's Empire Stadium to protest the BC government. In the face of a threatened general strike, the government backs down on its plans for mass layoffs of its employees.
- 1983 July-August – Members of the BC Government Employees' Union (BCGEU) hold a three-week occupation of Tranquille Institution in Kamloops, after learning the provincial government is planning its closure. Due to the occupation, the institution is allowed to function until 1985.
- 1983 – "La Grève de la fierté", strike by garment workers in Montréal, Canada; the first strike by International Ladies Garment Workers Union members in Montréal in 43 years.
- 1984 – The Canadian Auto Workers Union (properly the National Automobile, Aerospace, Transportation and General Workers Union of Canada) is founded. Bob White, an official of the United Auto Workers, encourages the Canadian membership of the U.A.W. to split away and form a separate union. White is C.A.W.'s first president. (split covered in NFB film Final Offer)
- 1984 – Strike at Eaton's department stores by the Retail, Wholesale and Department Store Union (RWDSU) begins in November in southern Ontario. The strike is settled the following May.
- 1985 – The Canadian Auto Workers becomes independent of their former parent union, the United Auto Workers. This process is documented in the film Final Offer (1985).
- 1986 – Alberta NDP takes 16 seats, a record for the party up to that time and until 2015. It becomes Official Opposition. (Brian Mason is elected as MLA - he will be an NDP cabinet minister in 2015).
- 1986 – Six-month-long strike at the Gainers meatpacking plant in Edmonton. picket line violence, and hundreds arrested. Alberta government loaned owner Pocklington millions. He ended strike, but did not repay government loan. (Government seized the packing plant and eventually sold it to Burns, who sold it to Maple Leaf. Finally in 1997 plant workers went on strike again, and the plant ceased operation.)

== 1990s ==
- 1991 – New Democratic Party (NDP) is elected to government in Saskatchewan. The NDP will govern that province until 2007.
- 1991 Canadian federal worker strike
- 1992 – Westray Mine at Plymouth, Nova Scotia suffers explosion, killing 26 workers. Canada's worst mine disaster since 1958, which had happened nearby.
- 1992 – A bomb at the Giant Mine in the Northwest Territories kills nine replacement workers. Striking mine employee Roger Warren is eventually convicted on nine counts of second-degree murder.
- 1992 – National Hockey League strike
- 1993 – Local 598 in Sudbury, Ontario, which was the only Mine Mill local in the world not to join the United Steelworkers when the two unions merged in 1967, joins the Canadian Auto Workers.
- 1997 – Ontario teachers strike
- 1998 – Teenagers Jennifer Wiebe and Tessa Lowinger successfully unionize a McDonald's franchise in Squamish, British Columbia. However, the union is decertified in July 1999.
- 1999 – Roughly 1,800 technicians for the Canadian Broadcasting Corporation went on strike.

== 2000s ==
- 2000 November 22 – a McDonald's restaurant in Montreal is unionized. The location is closed down on August 31, 2001, with the owner claiming economic pressures due to a rent hike. This is later documented in the film Maxime, McDuff & McDo.
- 2001 September 11 – the Public Service Alliance of Canada (PSAC) union suspends a planned national strike action in order to return to work and help Canadians.
- 2002 – Alberta teachers strike - 21,000 stayed out of schools for three weeks in February. Government passed what some called draconian legislation, Bill 12. With the law facing legal appeal, government allowed teachers fair arbitration process. New contract signed between Alberta Teachers' Association and government in April.
- 2004 – CN Rail workers strike
- 2004 – After 3 weeks of striking, PSAC members are mandated back to work by Prime Minister Brian Mulroney.
- 2005 – Wal-Mart closes its Saguenay, Quebec store, the first store of its brand in Canada in process of being unionized.
- 2006 May 29 – Toronto Transit Commission workers stage a one-day wildcat strike.
- 2006 – Ontario province-wide strike of college staff. Ontario College Professor John Stammers is fatally injured while trying to stop car from crossing picket line.
- 2007 – Supreme Court of Canada rules that collective bargaining is a constitutional right protected by The Charter of Rights and Freedoms. The specific ruling was that the BC government's Bill 29 violated Charter rights by limiting activities of unionized health-care and social services employees.
- 2008 April 26 – Toronto Transit Commission strike
- 2008September 19 – Fire destroys the historic Sudbury Steelworkers Hall in Sudbury, Ontario.
- 2008December 10 – OC Transpo drivers and mechanics strike
- 2009 – City of Windsor inside and outside workers strike begins in April.
- 2009 – Nova Scotia New Democratic Party elected to government, in power until 2013.
- 2009 – City of Toronto inside and outside workers strike begins in June.
- 2009 July 13 – Workers at Vale's operations in Sudbury embark on a year-long strike over contract concessions.

== 2010s ==
- 2004-2006 – The Ottawa Panhandlers' Union (founded by the Industrial Workers of the World (IWW)) unionizes anyone who makes their living in the street, including buskers, street vendors, the homeless, scrappers, and panhandlers. In the summer of 2004, the Union leads a strike by the homeless (the Homeless Action Strike) in Ottawa. The strike causes Ottawa city council to agree to fund a street newspaper created and sold by the homeless. In 2006, the Union takes over the Elgin Street police station for a day.
- 2010 July 5 – A tentative resolution of the Vale strike in Sudbury is announced.
- 2012 February 2 – In Halifax, Amalgamated Transit Union goes on strike, crippling the city's public transportation. Transit workers had been denied salary or compensation increases due to a reported $3M deficit. The strike ended March 14, 2012.
- 2012 September 11 – Ontario Premier Dalton McGuinty and the Liberal party pass Bill 115 'Putting Students First Act 2012', thereby eliminating the rights of all teachers in the province to go on strike for the next two years. Bill 115 also freezes wages, grants ten sick days per year (down from twenty) and eliminates banked sick days from previous years. Unions state that this bill is a violation of their members' rights under the Charter of Rights and Freedoms and that the bill violates the Ontario Labour Relations Act of 1995.
- 2013 – Unifor is formed through the merger of the Canadian Auto Workers and the Communications, Energy and Paperworkers Union of Canada, becoming largest private-sector union in the country.
- 2015 – NDP elected to government in Alberta, stays in power until 2019.
- 2018 – Series of strikes by Canadian Union of Postal Workers (CUPW) begin in October. The following month, Prime Minister Justin Trudeau's government mandates that CUPW members return to work, which they do although they are without a new contract ratified until September 2021.
- 2019 – Sheet Metal Workers' International Association ICI (Industrial, Commercial, Institutional) members go on strike in Ontario for 8 weeks in May and June, first strike in 30 years for that organization.

== 2020s ==
- 2020 – NDP elected to government in BC.
- 2021–2025 – Vancouver airport hotel strike begins in May 2021. UNITE HERE Local 40 and the PHI Hotel Group do not settle until March 2025, making it the longest strike in Canadian history.
- 2021 – Kitimat smelter strike by Unifor Local 2301 lasts from July to October.
- 2023 – Canadian federal workers strike.
- 2023 – Quebec public sector strikes. "Common Front" of four union federations - Confédération des syndicats nationaux (CSN), Centrale des syndicats du Québec (CSQ), Fédération des travailleurs et travailleuses du Québec (FTQ), and Alliance du personnel professionnel et technique de la santé et des services sociaux (APTS) - conducted major strikes that involved 500,000 nurses, teachers and other workers, including a general strike of public workers that lasted six days Dec. 8-14. Quebec, with 22 percent of the population, accounted for 43 percent of Canada's work stoppages.
- 2024-2025 Canada Post labour dispute. Canada Post strike begins in November 2024. It is suspended in December. Postal workers back on strike again in September 2025 after government opens door to deep cuts.
- 2025 – Air Canada flight attendants strike, demanding pay for uncompensated groundwork. A few hours after the strike starts, the Canadian government moves to end it and forces arbitration.
- 2025 – Alberta teachers strike begins October 6 when 51,000 teachers walk off the job. Government bargaining committee serves the teachers with a lockout notice. The strike, organized by the Alberta Teachers' Association (ATA), affects about 750,000 students in 2,500 public, Catholic and francophone schools. The ATA says it is fighting for class-size reduction and better wages.

== See also ==
- Canadian Labour Revolt
- Labour parties and candidates in Canada
- List of incidents of civil unrest in Canada
- List of Labour MPs (Canada)
- Timeline of labour in Greater Sudbury
- List of disasters in Canada by death toll
