= 1843 Lachine Canal strike =

1843 labour strike in Montreal, Canada

Lachine Canal strike
- 1843
- Location: Province of Canada
- Caused by: Wage cuts
- Goals: Wage restitution
- Methods: Strikes and demonstrations

Parties
Irish navvies	71st regiment

Number
1,300	

Casualties
- Arrested: 27

During the 1843 Lachine Canal strike, an estimated 1,100 to 1,300 workers on the Lachine Canal expansion project in Montreal—then part of the Province of Canada under the British Empire—walked off the job after their wages were cut by one-third, down to just 2 shillings a day. The canal workers were predominantly marginalized Irish migrant labourers who lived with their families, including women and children, in the shantytown around the worksite. They demanded their wage be increased to 3-and-a-half shillings a day, and they wanted to be paid in cash, not credits to the company store, which was operated by contractors. The Canal workers at the nearby Beauharnois Canal also went on strike sometime in early 1843 in response to poor wages.

== Background ==
Historian H. Clare Pentland writes that Irish immigrant workers "became the first Canadian proletariat", despite their largely agrarian background. In Ireland, they had endured "chronic poverty" and "brutal repression", and they arrived in Canada with little money or support. As they settled in Canada, they gravitated to public works jobs like canal construction—which required hundreds, sometimes thousands, of labourers who worked by hand. There was little competition for these public works jobs, and the labour surplus from the influx of Irish immigrants allowed contractors running the worksites to "keep wages at levels well below what workers needed to subsist".

Pentland writes that Irish immigrants employed on public works projects were isolated "in space and social class". These projects were large, remote, and temporary, so there was no existing housing. Therefore, workers and their families lived in small, makeshift wooden huts around the worksites, forming shantytowns. Workers were only paid in credits to the company store, which contractors who ran the public works projects profited from. Goods from the company store were more expensive, and workers could not use the credits they were paid to purchase food and supplies from elsewhere. Workers with families were the most negatively impacted by the economic hardship caused by the shantytown isolation and the company store system.

== Events ==
The Lachine Canal strike began over a wage dispute. The Irish immigrant workers may have expected their wages to be the customary 3 shillings-a-day. However, when they arrived at the work site in January 1843, they were told they would only be paid 2 shillings-a-day in company-store credit. They went on strike the next day.

After the work stoppage began at the Lachine Canal, violence broke out between rival factions of canal workers, one being migrants from Cork, Ireland, and the other larger group from Connaught. The military intervened and sent the 71st regiment to confiscate weapons and arrest the ringleaders of the factions. Twenty-seven people were arrested in January. When the Montreal Gazette covered the strike and the clashes, the correspondent portrayed the violence as "manifestations of hereditary hatred ... imported among us from various provinces in Ireland", rather than a conflict stemming from the workers' material conditions. This narrative quickly spread throughout the Montreal press and stoked xenophobia against the migrant canal workers.

The strike carried on for several weeks, with violence erupting periodically. Then in March, the canal workers staged a demonstration; led by fife players, they marched from the shantytown on the banks of the Lachine Canal into the city of Montreal and gathered peacefully on the steps of the Bank of Montreal. They appealed to a local magistrate, Benjamin Holmes, and the St. Patrick's Society of Montreal to ask for an investigation into the strike. The march garnered sympathy from some of the Montreal press. However, despite the coverage of the strike and the demonstration, the voices of the workers themselves were almost completely absent from the press. One exception was a statement from a worker printed in the Montreal Gazette, in which the worker criticized public works contractors on the canal "[who want] to live by the sweat of our brow". Increasingly, editorials in the press were critical of the contractors and the way they paid canal workers in credits that could only be used to buy goods at the contractors' company store.

The Lachine Canal strike ended in March 1843 after work recommenced on that worksite; there was no clear conclusion or formal agreement. Later that year on 12 June, the strike led by the workers at the nearby Beauharnois Canal turned deadly. After the Beauharnois workers attacked two contractors, the 74th army regiment confronted them and killed as many as 20 workers and injured 50.

== See also ==
- Shiners' War
- Welland Canal Riot
