= 1976 CASAW wildcat strike =

The 1976 CASAW wildcat strike was a wildcat strike action by members of the Canadian Association of Smelters and Allied Workers Union (CASAW) against Alcan in Kitimat, British Columbia. From June 3 to June 21 (18 days) union members blockaded roads to protest against Alcan management and wage and price controls imposed by the federal government. CASAW was not a member of the Canadian Labour Congress, the country's mainstream labour federation. Instead, it was affiliated with the Confederation of Canadian Unions.

== Aftermath ==
CASAW was sued by Alcan for $1 million and over 200 union members were disciplined by the company for their role in the strike. Following the strike, the two unions built a stronger relationship which culminated in a Mutual Defence Pact. In 1978, CASAW negotiated a collective bargaining agreement with Alcan.

== See also ==
- 2021 Kitimat smelter strike
