= Construction Maintenance and Allied Workers =

Canadian trade union

Construction, Maintenance and Allied Workers Canada
- Abbreviation: CMAW
- Type: Trade union
- Headquarters: Burnaby, British Columbia, Canada
- Locations: Alberta, Canada; British Columbia, Canada
- Members: 8,000
- President: Chris Wasilenchuk
- Secretary-treasurer: Jessie Gregory
- Affiliations: Confederation of Canadian Unions
- Website: cmaw.ca

The Construction, Maintenance and Allied Workers Canada (CMAW) is a construction trade union headquartered in Vancouver. The purpose of the CMAW is to negotiate pay and work conditions on behalf of its 8,000 members in British Columbia and Alberta. It is affiliated with the independent Confederation of Canadian Unions.

== History ==
The Construction Maintenance and Allied Workers Canada (CMAW) was officially formed in 2007 following an 11-year struggle with their American-based international parent union, the United Brotherhood of Carpenters and Joiners of America (UBCJA).

CMAW-organized employers have constructed projects in Western Canada such as the Waneta Dam, the John Hart Dam, Site C dam, Alcan Aluminium Smelter, CNRL Horizon major projects, Mosaic Potash and the National Ship Building Procurement.

The union is a member of the Confederation of Canadian Unions as of September 2013.

== Organization ==
CMAW comprises ten locals in BC and Alberta and is governed by a 12-person executive board of directly elected representatives. The officers are elected by delegates at CMAW's biennial convention. CMAW's president and secretary-treasurer are full-time CMAW employees.

Its official publication is The Write Angle, a member publication mailed quarterly.
