= Canadian Union of Skilled Workers =

Canadian trade union

- Abbreviation: CUSW
- Predecessor: IBEW Local 1788
- Formation: 1999; 27 years ago
- Headquarters: 10 Carlson Court, Suite 802; Toronto, Ontario M9W 6L2
- Chairperson: John Wabb
- Treasurer: Don Mayer
- Recorder: Shawn Campbell
- Website: cusw.ca

The Canadian Union of Skilled Workers (CUSW) is a blended skilled trades union based in Canada. It was founded in February 1999 and was a former local (Local 1788) of the International Brotherhood of Electrical Workers, which then represented Ontario employees of Ontario Hydro. They later began representing some Bruce Power employees. The organization is affiliated with the Confederation of Canadian Unions.
