= 2021–2025 Vancouver airport hotel strike =

2020s Vancouver airport hotel strike

2020s Vancouver airport hotel strike
- Date: 3 May 2021 - 14 March 2025
- Location: Radisson Blu Vancouver Airport Hotel, British Columbia, Canada
- Caused by: Workers fired during COVID-19 pandemic, and not rehired
- Methods: Strike, picket lines, boycott
- Result: New collective agreement ratified; Terminated employees have pathway back to work

Parties
UNITE HERE Local 40	PHI Hotel Group

The Vancouver airport hotel strike of 2021–2025 was a strike action by workers at the Radisson Blu airport hotel in Vancouver, British Columbia. It lasted from May 2021 until March 2025 for a total of 1,411 days, making it the longest strike in Canadian history, far surpassing the 2009–2010 Vale Inco strike.

During the COVID-19 pandemic, the Pacific Gateway Hotel (renamed the Radisson Blu Vancouver Airport Hotel in 2023) laid off 143 workers, despite the hotel being fully booked by the federal government as a quarantine site for international travelers. In a show of support, the remaining hotel workers walked out on May 3, 2021, demanding their colleagues get their jobs back.

The stalemate between the PHI Hotel Group representing Radisson Blu, and UNITE HERE Local 40 representing the airport hotel workers, lasted nearly four years. A mediator was brought in to help the two parties negotiate a settlement. On March 14, 2025, a collective agreement was ratified by the hotel workers. It included improved pay, benefits, and job security protections, along with a pathway back for the workers laid off during the pandemic.

== Background ==
At the onset of the COVID-19 pandemic in April 2020, the federal government's Public Health Agency of Canada (PHAC) took over the 382-room Pacific Gateway Hotel at Vancouver International Airport (YVR) and managed it as a quarantine site for travelers arriving in the city. The travelers needed a place to wait out their mandated 14-day quarantine period, and the airport hotel offered a convenient location. In this partnership between the PHAC and Pacific Gateway, the government agency utilized the Red Cross "to perform some of the responsibilities typically performed by hotel workers."

As a result of having additional Red Cross labour, the Pacific Gateway owners laid off 143 employees, or roughly 70 per cent of the hotel staff.

In June 2021, thousands of hospitality workers across British Columbia went on strike for the right of recall, which is an employee's right to return to work after being laid off if work later becomes available. Many employees anticipated they would be able to return to work once the pandemic eased, as was the case for other British Columbia hotels. Workers were concerned that if they lacked robust recall protections, they would instead be replaced by new, lower paid employees.

In August 2020, the government of British Columbia conducted a review in which it determined that recall rights should be decided voluntarily between employers and employees. BC Labour Minister Harry Bains stated that while he was sympathetic to the striking hospitality workers, the government would not intervene with right-to-recall legislation.

Although union workers at the Pacific Gateway Hotel had a recall clause in their existing collective agreement, it expired after one year and was outlived by lock-down measures in Canada. Once the clause expired, the company decided to terminate the 143 employees permanently.

== Strike ==
Dozens of the airport hotel's remaining workers—room attendants, front desk agents, cooks, dishwashers, servers, baristas, housemen, and maintenance crew—walked out on May 3, 2021. They demanded their co-workers be reinstated; they also fought against recent rollbacks in wages and working conditions.

While the workers set up daily picket lines, the BC Federation of Labour and the Canadian Labour Congress organized a boycott of Pacific Gateway. In the ensuing months, some of the striking workers obtained other jobs to cover their expenses, while still doing their designated picket shift every week. Their intention was to return to the airport hotel once a new collective agreement was reached.

In early 2022, after pressure from UNITE HERE, the PHAC removed the Pacific Gateway Hotel from its suite of quarantine hotels. To expand the boycott, the union sent an open letter in 2023 to the presidents of Carnival Corporation, Carnival UK, and Cunard, urging those luxury cruise lines to halt their use of the Radisson Blu airport hotel as an embarkment stop for passengers on Alaskan cruises from Vancouver. The Richmond City Council honored the boycott by vowing to not support events or promote business with the hotel until the labour strife was resolved.

Throughout the three years and ten months of the strike, there were numerous clashes that had to be adjudicated by the British Columbia Labour Relations Board. For example, the hotel sought to ban picketing on its premises, labeling it as trespassing. UNITE HERE argued that picketing on an employer's property is allowed under the Labour Code during a strike, and the Board agreed.

In July 2023, after the union filed a complaint with the BC Labour Relations Board that the Radisson Blu airport hotel was secretly using scabs to carry out tasks such as setting up guest rooms and conducting fire rounds, the Board ordered the hotel to provide disclosures on work performed:

These include providing the union with a daily breakdown of tasks performed by all managers hired after the hotel was given notice to bargain, and a daily list of all employees, contractors and subcontractors working in the hotel each day with their respective work assignments. The employer will also be required to provide hotel occupancy information to the union.

In September 2023, the Board ordered the hotel to undergo random inspections to ensure the rulings were being followed.

Tensions often flared between the picketing workers and hotel owners. Majority owner Sukhminder Rai was accused of intimidating and threatening certain picketers, and making inappropriate promises to others. In one instance, he told an elderly worker on the picket line that she should go home and take care of her grandchildren, and he would give her money. In another instance, he told a picketer from the hotel's maintenance department: "The day after I settle, you know, I can fire you." After UNITE HERE filed a complaint against him, the Labour Relations Board held hearings in September 2023. The following May, the Board decided the employer had in fact violated several sections of the Labour Relations Code and was ordered "to cease and desist from further breaches of the Code."

While these incidents were occurring, representatives of the PHI Hotel Group and UNITE HERE were holding intermittent sessions at the bargaining table in an attempt to end the strike. One concern was that the union wanted to ensure job security for the returning workers, given that the hotel had earlier threatened to terminate strikers upon their return.

== Resolution ==
With the assistance of mediator Ken Saunders, the two parties came to a collective agreement in March 2025. It was ratified by the workers in a vote on March 14, thus ending the longest strike in Canadian history.

In a joint statement with Radisson Blu, UNITE HERE Local 40 announced that the new collective agreement "gives terminated workers the right to return based on seniority, with the recall period extending for 36 months, and workers will now earn the highest wages in the Vancouver airport and Richmond hotel market. The statement says the contract includes improved medical benefits, with lower eligibility requirements, as well as industry-leading cleaning standards."

The employer also agreed to provide recall protections and other job security protections in the event of future pandemics, emergencies or property renovations.

== See also ==
- Timeline of labour issues and events in Canada
