= Public and Private Workers of Canada =

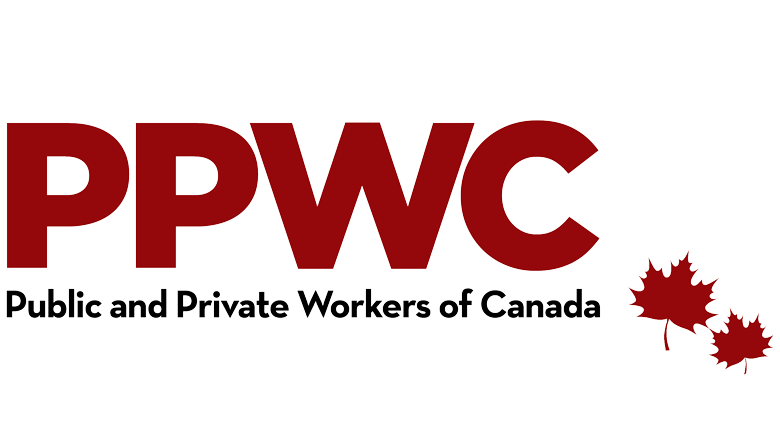
- Founded: 1963
- Headquarters: Vancouver, British Columbia
- Location: Canada
- Key people: Kelly Johnson, current president Orville Braaten, founder Angus McPhee, founder
- Affiliations: Confederation of Canadian Unions
- Website: Official site

The Public and Private Workers of Canada (PPWC) is a trade union based in British Columbia, Canada. Established in 1963 as the independent Pulp, Paper and Woodworkers of Canada, it has been affiliated with the Confederation of Canadian Unions since its founding in 1969.

== History ==
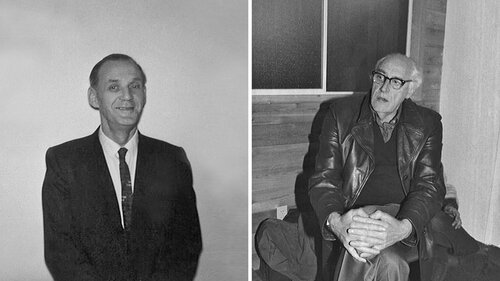
Orville Braaten (left) and Angus McPhee (right)

The PPWC was founded at a convention in January 1963 and five of the province's eleven unions representing papermakers were represented. It was part of the larger trend of unionization in Canada which emphasized independence from the United States-dominated international union movement as well as increased organizational democracy. The locals had previously been members of the US-based International Brotherhood of Pulp, Sulphite, and Paper Mill Workers and United Paperworkers' International Union (UPIU). Concern was expressed at the union's establishment by the business-oriented National Post.

Two of the leaders who founded the PPWC were Orville Braaten and Angus McPhee. Braaten served as President of the organization until his unexpected death in 1969, at the age of 51. McPhee was the first vice-president of the organization from 1964 to 1967 and its secretary-treasurer from 1968 to 1969. From 1971 to 1976, he was a National board member for Local 4 in Prince Rupert. In 1977, he was elected national President, serving until 1982.

== Structure ==
The PPWC represents workers in eight locals throughout British Columbia. The union is structured on democratic principles that empower the rank and file membership and participation. The locals include:

- Local 1, Castlegar, British Columbia
- Local 2, Crofton, British Columbia
- Local 5, New Westminster, British Columbia
- Local 8, Nanaimo, British Columbia
- Len Shankel Local 9, Prince George, British Columbia
- Local 15, Kimberley, British Columbia
- Local 18, Mackenzie, British Columbia
- Local 26, Castlegar, British Columbia

There are no trusteeship or administration provisions in the PPWC constitution. Each local union elects a member to sit on the National Executive Board (NEB), ensuring that the local unions have direct involvement in the operation of the national union. The NEB is charged with the administration and management of the national union between conventions.

The PPWC holds its national convention once every two years. The President, First Vice-President, Second Vice-President, and Secretary-Treasurer are elected at convention. All national and local officers are subject to recall by the membership at any time. Full-time officers’ salaries are equal to a tradesperson’s wage in the pulp and paper industry. The salaries are discontinued during a work stoppage at the officer’s home plant.

== Current Activities ==
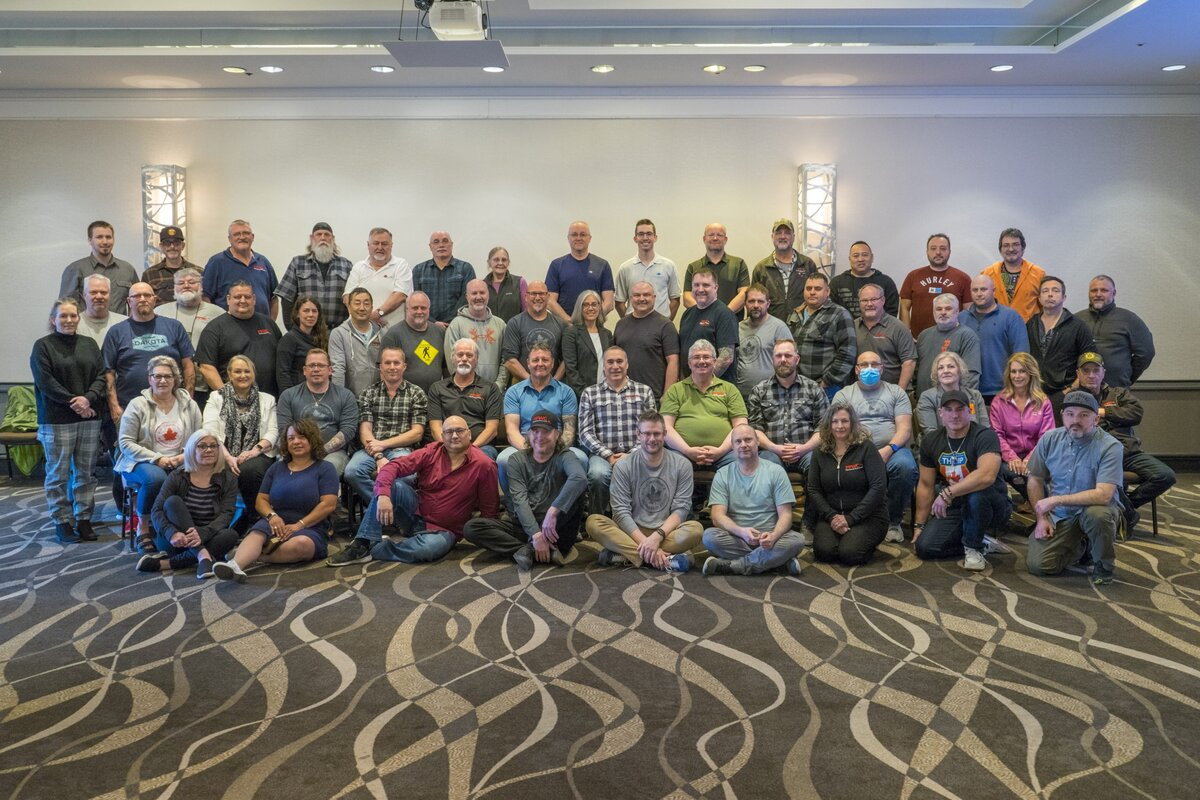
2022 PPWC Convention in Nanaimo, British Columbia

The PPWC is a socially and politically active union that supports progressive struggles for workers' rights, equality and democracy, and social justice.

To broaden its appeal to younger workers in the service industry and workers outside of the pulp and paper industry, the union officially changed its name to the Public and Private Workers of Canada at its 2015 Convention. Annually, it sponsors activities including International Workers' Day, the National Day of Mourning, Labour Day, Black History Month, International Women's Day, the National Day for Truth and Reconciliation, and the Moose Hide Campaign to end violence against women.

The PPWC is active organizing workers in the health and services industries throughout British Columbia. It also lobbies the provincial government of British Columbia to protect old growth forests and engage in environmentally sustainable forestry practices. The PPWC works with its fellow CCU members throughout Canada, sponsoring online petitions, voter educational programs, labour schools on a variety of progressive issues, and other forms of progressive political activism.
