= 2021 Kitimat smelter strike =

The 2021 Kitimat smelter strike was a 69-day labor strike by Rio Tinto workers in Kitimat, British Columbia, Canada.

== Background ==
Aluminum producer Rio Tinto is the main employer in the municipality of Kitimat, in the North Coast region of British Columbia. The workers of the Rio Tinto aluminum smelter and Kemano hydroelectric power plant in Kitimat are represented by Unifor, as Local 2301, with around 950 workers in total.

== Strike ==
The collective bargaining agreement between Unifor Local 2301 and Rio Tinto expired in 2021. Negotiations for a new agreement, however, broke down during the summer, with the union accusing Rio Tinto of having used contractors and temporary employees in violation of the previous agreement, of failing to address concerns over pensions, of forcing younger employees into bad pension plans, and of having several hundred employee grievances in backlog. Rio Tinto accused the union of having too many demands and of rejecting a third party mediator for negotiations.

On 21 July, the union announced a 72-hour strike notice, with the workers having voted unanimously to go on strike. National Unifor president Jerry Dias released a statement saying that "despite record-setting profits, Rio Tinto appears so unwilling to work with us and treat our members fairly" and that the union had proposed the first increase in employee benefits in a decade. On 25 July, at one minute past midnight, the first workers walked off the job. The strike had begun. The B.C. Labour Relations Board, however, issued an essential services order in support of the smelter. The smelter would continue to operate at 25% capacity during the strike. Striking workers would receive $300 a week from the Unifor strike fund and an additional $100 a week from the Local 2301 strike fund to compensate for lost salaries.

Despite reporting a decrease in sales of up to 30%, a number of local business supported the strike, offering the striking workers free lunches and free haircuts. On 29 July, local NDP MP Taylor Bachrach visited the strikers, stating that "when you have a historic strike vote of 100 per cent for the first time in the history of this plant and in the history of this community, that means that things have gotten pretty bad." Local MLA Ellis Ross called for the British Columbian government to intervene, stating that he didn't want "to see Kitimat going into decline" or "people suffering to make mortgage payments." On 5 August, after there had been no negotiations between the union and Rio Tinto, several hundred local residents held a rally to "save the northwest," calling for the two sides to resume negotiating.

On 15 August, the captain of MV Indiana, a Norwegian cargo ship that had arrived in Kitimat a week before the strike to collect aluminum shipments and got stuck due to the strike, released a statement saying that the ship was running out of low sulphur marine fuel. Arbutus Point Marine. subcontractor Northwest Fuels, who held responsibility for delivering fuel to the ship, was refusing to cross the picket line.

On August 12, the two sides held a meeting to determine whether there was enough common ground to continue negotiations. On 25 August, the union and Rio Tinto agreed to resume collective bargaining negotiations. On 2 September, the two sides released a joint statement saying that the negotiations were progressing well.

On 25 September, the union and Rio Tinto announced that a new collective bargaining agreement had been reached. On 4 October, the workers voted to ratify the deal by a majority of 70.6%, bringing an end to the strike. Rio Tinto also announced that a memorandum of understanding had been reached on working together and that a protocol for returning to work on the B.C. Works operation had been outlined.

== See also ==
- 1976 CASAW wildcat strike
