= Nine-Hour Movement =

19th-century Canadian labor movement

The Nine-Hour Movement was a campaign by Canadian workers between January and June 1872 to reduce the standard working day to nine hours. It began in Hamilton, spread to Toronto and Montreal, and won support in Ontario towns from Sarnia to Perth. The Nine-Hour Movement, which pushed for the nine-hour workday, was Canada's first attempt at a national labour movement. The action mobilized both unionized and non-unionized workers. The movement came to its height on May 15, 1872, when a large procession of workers paraded through Hamilton. While the movement failed to deliver the nine-hour work day to most industries, it had a major impact on labour relations in Canada.

== Background ==
==== Industrialization in Canada ====
An illustration of the Wanzer Sewing Machine Factory in Hamilton, Ontario. Hamilton was a prominent early manufacturing centre in Canada.

Industrialization began in Canada in the 1840s and 1850s, largely driven by railway construction and a growth in manufacturing. Canadian industrialization changed the nature of labour and capitalism in Canada; the wage labour workforce expanded, and mechanized factories became increasingly common in industrial urban centres. However, industrialization and the increasing work-discipline which accompanied industrialization also led to the initial stirrings of class consciousness among Canadian workers during the mid-1800s. Workers resisted the expansion of industrialization and mechanization, and their response techniques became increasingly advanced throughout the 19^{th}century.

==== Growth of Organized Labour in Canada ====
Organized labour and trade unions would play an essential role in the Nine-Hour Movement. Trade unions had rather slow and humble beginnings in Canada. The first unions emerging in the 1850s were highly localized and trade-specific; there was little communication or coordination between workers across localities or different industries. As such, early unions were quite limited in their capabilities. Through the 1860s and into the early 1870s, the organized labour movement in Canada experienced rapid growth and development. It was during this period that international trade unions began expanding into central Canada, helping to establish stronger international labour networks. Another important advancement in the trade-union movement during the 1860s and early 1870s, was the founding of central trade assemblies in major cities. The Toronto Trades Assembly, for example, was founded in 1871. Union organization experienced a general growth beyond traditional trades and urban centres during these years as well. These developments in organized labour helped foster early exhibits of class solidarity and class consciousness that would prove essential in the Nine-Hour Movement.

==== Contemporary International Movements for Shorter Working Hours ====
Contemporary organized labour movements fighting for shorter days in both the United States. and the United Kingdom had a significant influence on Canadian labour organizers. In both countries, the organized labour movement was rather developed by the 1870s, and they were committed to fighting for social and political reform. In the UK, the passage of the Trade Union Bill was seen as a major success for labour; the bill effectively legalized unions, while criminalizing certain union actions such as picketing and intimidation. However, British statutes did not apply in Canada at this point, and the protections were therefore not extended to Canadian unions.

==== Growth of Organized Labour in Hamilton ====
Some of the earliest examples of labour organization and worker resistance can be found in Hamilton. Unions began emerging in Hamilton as early as 1845, and gradually spread in the 1850s and 1860s. A few international labour organizations opened chapters in Hamilton during this period, such as the Amalgamated Society of Engineers, a major British trade union. Of the nine strikes Robert Kristofferson identifies in Hamilton before 1872, eight strikes lasted only a few hours or days. The most notable strikes to occur in Hamilton before 1872 were the journeymen bakers strikes of 1862 and 1869. These strikes, although unsuccessful in achieving the hours or pay reform demanded by the bakers, were essential early practices in labour solidarity in the city.

== Movement Emergence and Growth ==
==== Founding of the Nine Hour League ====
Hamilton workers held a meeting on January 17, 1872, to discuss an organized labour movement to demand a nine-hour workday. Momentum spread quickly throughout Hamilton, and a general meeting was held on January 27, 1872, where workers outlined their demands. The demands included a reduction in working hours from ten hours to nine and receiving pay on Friday evenings (rather than Saturday afternoon, as had been standard). The workers cited the desire for more intellectual stimulation as a key motivation of the movement; James Ryan, an Irish-born machinist and engineer with the Great Western Railway, argued that workers wanted "more brains" rather than "more money" and that a reduction in working hours allowed more time for intellectual development. At another meeting in Hamilton on January 31, 1872, the Nine Hours League was formed. The Nine Hours League was open to both union and non-union members of all trades and pushed for a national movement for the nine-hour day.

The movement continued to grow in Hamilton, with Nine-Hour League secretary James Ryan calling for “an Ontario-wide movement for the nine-hour day” on February 11, 1872. On February 13, 1872, all employers in Hamilton were given formal written petitions requesting the nine-hour workday, demanding its implementation by May 15; the employers met on the same day, and unanimously opposed the movement. The first labour action of the Nine-Hour Movement when 130 sewing machinists in Hamilton went on strike for a week on February 20, 1872. On February 24, 1872, another mass meeting was held calling for the escalation of labour action.

==== Growth Throughout Ontario and Quebec ====
Interest in the nine-hour workday had also been growing in Toronto around this time. On February 2, 1872, Toronto union leaders agreed that the nine-hour workday was their goal, and a mass meeting of workers was held by the Toronto Trades Assembly on February 14, 1872. At the meeting, the attendees agreed to take the necessary action to pursue a 54-hour work week (which converted to a nine-hour workday). Unlike the Hamilton movement, the Toronto movement consisted primarily of union-men, organized by the Toronto Trades Assembly, and was far less centralized.

The movement gained attention throughout Ontario and into Quebec in February and March. A Nine Hour League was formed in Brantford in late February, and workers throughout Ontario (including in Stratford, London, Dundas, Sarnia, and Oshawa) began engaging with the movement. On March 5, 1872, the Montreal Nine Hour League was formed. Led by Grand Trunk Railway worker James Black, the League had approximately 2,000 members by the end of March. League organizers, particularly Ryan of the Hamilton League, worked tirelessly to coordinate their labour actions. League organizers drafted a plan for a gradual increase in labour action in various cities to push for the nine-hour day. Hamilton was to initiate strike action on May 15^{th}, with Toronto following on June 1^{st}. From there, labour action would spread to Montreal. This plan was formulated to ensure striking workers could be financially supported by League members in other cities.

== Toronto Printers' Strike ==
In Toronto, members of the Toronto Typographical Union issued their demand for a nine-hour day on March 13, 1872. The employers immediately formed a resistance organization, the Master Printers’ Association led by George Brown, proprietor of the Toronto Globe newspaper and a prominent former politician, and rejected this demand on March 19, 1872. When the employers refused, the printers struck on March 25, 1872. The strike was led publicly by printer J. S. Williams, editor of the labour newspaper the Ontario Workman. James Beaty was the only master printer in the city to concede to these demands, and he publicly defended the printers. On April 15, 1872, the printers marched to a large demonstration of working men in Queen’s Park, where approximately 10,000 people had gathered in favour of the nine-hour day.

The following day, on April 16, 23 printers (members of the Toronto Typographical Union’s “Vigilance Committee”) were arrested on charges of conspiracy. Under British Common Law, which still formed the basis of Canadian law at the time, “combinations of workingmen were illegal if they tried to affect hours, wages, the amount of work, or the behaviour of other employees”. The printers’ trial began on April 18^{th}, 1872, but the defence lawyers managed to get the case adjourned for a period. In response to the growing tensions, Prime Minister John A. Macdonald introduced the Trade Unions Act in parliament. This law would legalize trade unions in Canada (yet they could still be criminally charged for various actions such as picketing). Following the passage of the law on June 14, 1872, the case against the printers was dropped.

== Movement Decline ==
Labour action occurred across Ontario and Quebec in April and May, with notable incidents in Perth, Oshawa, Montreal, Guelph, St. Catharines, Brantford, Aurora, Sarnia, Sherbrooke, Brockville, and Kingston. In fact, carpenters and joiners in London, Ontario went on strike on June 1, 1872, demanding a nine-hour working day. As the May 15 deadline in Hamilton approached, the employers began locking out their workers in a coordinated resistance to the workers’ demands.

An illustration of the May 15, 1872 parade in Hamilton for the nine-hour day, as depicted in the Canadian Illustrated News from the period.

The height of the movement occurred on May 15, 1872, in Hamilton with a general strike and a parade for the 9-hour day. A general strike occurred in the city, and approximately 1,500 workers marched through the streets in a parade-fashion, with workers of nearly all trades and industries represented. Many workers decorated floats or carried banners representing both pride in their craft and labour solidarity. An estimated 3,000 additional citizens in Hamilton watched the parade. However, momentum for the movement seems to have slowed following the parade, as employer resistance seemed impossible to defeat.

Following the demonstration in Hamilton on May 15, and facing seemingly unbreakable employer resistance, the movement gradually began to decline. Momentum in Toronto had stalled following the Printers’ Strike, and Toronto workers were unable to organize their planned general strike for June 1. On June 8, 1872, in Hamilton, approximately 300 men demonstrated outside the Wanzer sewing machinery, but the demonstration was promptly dismissed by the police. This would be the final labour action of the movement in Hamilton. Once it became apparent that the movement was in decline, the Montreal league terminated financial aid to the Hamilton strikers, and the Hamilton workers returned to work.

== Outcome ==
The Nine-Hour Movement was generally unsuccessful at securing the nine-hour day for Canadian workers. Employer hostility and resistance, the waning prosperity of various industries, and significant divisions within the labour force have all been identified as factors in the movement's failure. Furthermore, the limited organization of labour in Canada at this point and the immaturity of worker class solidarity at this time restricted the ability of the movement to build worker solidarity. The campaign was led mostly by skilled male tradesmen, and women and un`skilled labourers remained largely on its margins. Robert Kristofferson argues that, contrary to popular belief, the Nine-Hour movement had a limited effect on labour relations in Hamilton. Extreme labour action only occurred within a few workplaces, and for about half of the workforce, the situation never prompted serious labour actions or lockouts. Furthermore, craft mutualism between masters and men in Hamilton was generally retained, although weakened, following the end of the movement.

Despite its failure to secure the nine-hour workday, the movement succeeded in creating a unified protest and encouraged workers to fight for their rights through legal measures of labour law. Furthermore, the movement signalled that labour had a public presence and that its interests, institutions, and political stances reflected its unique social position and economic needs.

== Legacy ==
The most important legal result of the Nine-Hour movement was the Trade Unions Act, introduced on April 18, 1872, by Prime Minister Sir John A. Macdonald, and passed by Parliament on June 14, 1872. The act legalized membership in trade unions and protected union members from conspiracy charges for strike action; however, the companion criminal code amendments made certain actions, including picketing and “intimidation”, illegal. As a result, the criminal prosecution of the printers in Toronto was dropped. The passage of the Trade Unions Act is generally seen as a successful attempt by Macdonald to garner the political support of the working class. Following the Nine-Hour Movement in 1872, labour held an increasingly important position in Canadian politics. Workers participated in politics through labour action, petitioning, and electing labour candidates to parliament.

The Nine-Hour Movement, and the skills of labour organization needed to coordinate such an immense movement, helped encourage the growth and strengthening of organized labour associations and movements in Canada. The Canadian Labor Protective and Mutual Improvement Association was founded in Hamilton in 1872. This organization later evolve into the Canadian Labour Union, founded in April 1873. Furthermore, unions were increasingly growing and communicating with each other, and new organized labour organizations were being formed to represent workers’ interests on a city, provincial, or national level. The Canadian Labour Congress credits the Toronto printers' strike as a root of the annual Labour Day celebrations. Accompanying the growth in organized labour following the Nine-Hour Movement was an increase in class consciousness among Canadian workers, as the movement had provided new opportunities for workers to cooperate and coordinate their actions beyond their trades and cities. Hamilton workers would continue the fight for shorter working hours for many years, with notable instances occurring in the 1880s with the Knights of Labour and by munitions workers during the First World War.

== See also ==
- Eight-hour day
- Toronto Typographical Union
- Labour Day
- Trade Unions Act, 1872
