= Canadian Labour Union =

The Canadian Labour Union (1872 – 1878) was the short-lived first attempt at a national central organization to represent labour unions in Canada. It was founded in Toronto, Ontario on September 23, 1873, by 46 local unions. It could not be considered a national body as only Ontario-based unions participated. The Union was a political organization with the aim "to agitate such questions as may be for the benefit of the working classes, in order that we may obtain the enactment of such measures by the Dominion and local legislatures as will be beneficial to us, and the repeal of all oppressive laws which now exist".

The CLU platform called for shorter hours, an end to the use of convict labour by private employers, the end of employment of children under ten years of age, immigration of ill-paid workers, a mechanics' lien act to allow workers a lien on bankrupt employers for unpaid wages, the enforcement of minimum standards of factory sanitation and ventilation, and a government bureau of statistics to provide information on wages and working conditions. It called for publicly funded education, opposition to the growing monopolies, and direct labour representation in legislatures and city governments. By no means a radical organization it urged the use of arbitration rather than strikes.

In 1873 a worldwide economic depression had a devastating effect on the fledgling Canadian labour movement. Of the 126 known unions at the start of the decade, only a few remained by the end bringing about the demise of the Canadian Labour Union.

== See also ==
- Nine-Hour Movement
- Trades and Labour Congress of Canada

== Sources ==
- Williams, C. Brian (1965). "Development of Relations between Canadian and American National Trade Union Centers — 1886-1925". Relations Industrielles / Industrial Relations. 20 (2): 340–371. doi:10.7202/027568ar. ISSN 0034-379X. JSTOR 23068987.
