= 1946 Montreal Cottons strike =

- Date: 1 June – 9 September 1946
- Location: Salaberry-de-Valleyfield, Quebec
- Goals: Union recognition, wage increases, shorter working hours
- Methods: Strike, picket lines, rioting
- Result: Victory for workers, improved wages and working conditions

Parties
Textile Workers Union of America	Dominion Textile	Quebec government

Lead figures
Kent Rowley; Madeleine Parent		Maurice Duplessis

Number
3,000 mill workers	400+ strikebreakers	250+ police

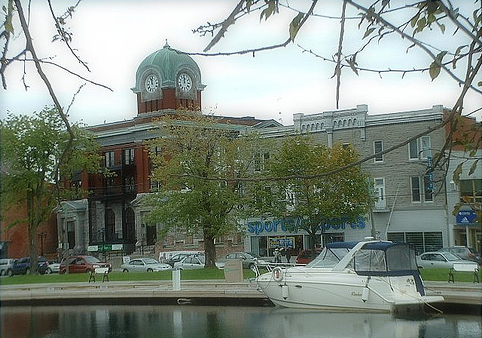
City centre of Salaberry-de-Valleyfield

The Montreal Cottons Company strike of 1946 was a hundred-day-long strike in which 3,000 mill workers in Salaberry-de-Valleyfield, Quebec, fought for the right to obtain a collective agreement with the management of the Montreal Cottons Company mill. Mill workers in Valleyfield walked off the job on June 1, 1946, as part of a larger textile strike movement.

Workers at one of Dominion Textile's mills located within Montreal went on strike at the same time. By August 1, the strike had been settled in Montreal and workers had returned to work at the Dominion Textile mills after entering negotiations with the company.

In Valleyfield the situation was different, and only after a violent riot on August 13 did the company seriously enter negotiations with the workers.

Both strikes were organized by the Textile Workers Union of America (TWUA), an international union. Kent Rowley and Madeleine Parent acted as representatives of the UTWA in Valleyfield.

After their riot closed down the mill as a going concern, Salaberry-de-Valleyfield strikers returned to work September 9, and a collective agreement was signed November 26 between Montreal Cottons Ltd. (the parent of Montreal Cotton Co.) and union representatives.

Locally, the strike was important since it was the first time that workers at Montreal Cotton's Valleyfield mill obtained a collective contract. The labour activism and the role of women in this strike challenge the historical narrative of a hegemonic conservative Quebec under the leadership of Maurice Duplessis.

== Background ==
From 1878 until the 1940s, Salaberry-de-Valleyfield was a monopoly town under the primary direction of Montreal Cottons. The company had a large influence over the city, as it provided jobs and housing for a large amount of the city's citizens. By the 1940s, Montreal Cottons had further established its sphere of influence by fostering ties with local parishes and provincial politicians. From its establishment in 1878 until 1946, relations between Montreal Cottons and its textile workers were often tense. In 1937 the company's workers went on strike for 28 days, demanding better working conditions and better pay. The strikers were represented by the Catholic Workers Confederation of Canada (CTCC) and were actively supported by the church. The strike was a failure. The CTCC had chosen Maurice Duplessis and Cardinal Villeneuve to mediate negotiations between the strikers and the company. The workers gained nothing from the negotiations or the strike.

The 1946 strike did not occur in a vacuum. Rather, it was the product of over four years of planning and a decade's worth of grievances. As early as 1942, Kent Rowley (a representative of the United Trade Workers Union (UTWA)) and Trefflé Leduc (a local union leader) had been organizing workers from Montreal Cotton's Valleyfield mills. The grievances of the workers to an extent echoed those of the 1937 strike, as well as the grievances issued in the Royal Commission Inquiry on the Textile Industry of 1938. Workers demanded a salary raise of fifteen cents an hour, a forty-hour work week, compensation for working overtime, better working conditions, and union recognition.

== The strike ==
On June 1, 1946, over 3000 workers from Montreal Cotton's mill in Valleyfield and 3000 workers from four of Dominion Textile's mills in Montreal, walked off the job. By June 3, an official strike had been declared by the United Textile Workers of America (UTWA) and within three days, the strike in Valleyfield had been publicly deemed illegal by the Minister of Labour, Humphrey Mitchell. In Valleyfield, the strike, the UTWA, Parent, and Rowley were all denounced as illegal, illegitimate and communist in nature by local newspapers, clergy, the company, and local and provincial authorities. By August 1, the strike had been settled in Montreal; workers had returned to work at the Dominion Textile mills after entering negotiations with the company. In Valleyfield the strike was at a standstill as no progression towards a settlement had been made. On August 8, members of the church, in conjunction with the company, formed a local union, L'Association des Employés du Textile de Salaberry de Valleyfied (AETSVU). The majority of the AETSVU's members were strikebreakers recruited from local parishes. On August 10, approximately 400 strike breakers left the church and marched with the support of the local clergy and police force to return to the mills. Under the direct order of Maurice Duplessis, the chief of the provincial police arrived the following day with two-hundred-fifty reinforcements, armed with machine guns, to escort the scabs to and from the mill.

On August 13 at 11 a.m., around five thousand people, the majority of them women and children, were gathered at the mill to support the strike. Upon seeing such a large crowd, the police threw tear gas bombs to disperse the crowd and to allow the strike breakers to leave the mill for their lunchtime break. The strikers and crowd responded to this provocation by throwing rocks and the tear gas bombs back at the police; this caused the police to retreat and seek shelter within the walls of the mills. After seven hours the riot ended with a truce that was negotiated by a committee representing the strikers and the police. In the truce, the committee agreed that strike breakers would not be mistreated upon leaving the factory and that the violence would end, provided that the provincial police and the company's private cops leave the city and that the company remain closed until the end of the strike. The demands were met; however, two days later Rowley and local union leader Trefflé Leduc were arrested and charged with inciting the riot. Upon Rowley's arrest, Parent took charge of the strike.

By September, the company had agreed to sign an agreement with the workers on the condition that the workers return to work and that a vote of accreditation be held to determine whether UTWA or AETSVU represent the workers. UTWA won the vote to represent the strikers by a ratio of 2:1; and by November 26 an agreement had officially been signed between UTWA representatives and Montreal Cottons. In this agreement workers gained: union recognition, a general wage raise of five cents for all employees, premiums for night workers, overtime pay, voluntary and revocable union dues, clauses on seniority, procedures for grievances, and one week's paid vacation for all employees. This was the first time in the company's history that workers in Valleyfield had gained the right to a collective agreement.

== Women's contribution ==
Madeleine Parent was a prominent figure of throughout the strike. She was a union leader, a negotiator, and an activist. She influenced and encouraged women to actively participate during the strike.

Women actively contributed to the strike as picketers, militants, providers, recruiters, and union members. Kent Rowley and Trefflé Leduc actively sought to recruit women as union members since not only did women constitute a large portion of the workforce, but they also had a large sphere of influence within the mills. Women organized and participated in union meetings and events. The mothers and wives of workers participated in the strike as well, they formed "Les Dames Auxiliaires" and provided food and necessities to strikers, stretching their savings to feed their families. It was "Les Dames Auxiliaires" who organized a crowd of 5000 people to meet in front of the mill on August 13. Women were active throughout the course of the strike: they organized and engaged in the riot by throwing rocks at the provincial police and by mediating the truce negotiations between the provincial police and Kent Rowley.
