= Vancouver Island Coal Miners' Strike =

1912–1914 worker protest in British Columbia

The Vancouver Island Coal Miners' Strike was from 1912–1914. The coal miners on the east coast of Vancouver Island refused to go to work, in protest of unsafe working conditions and unfair treatment. The strike began as peaceful protests, until built up anger caused by strike-breakers, also known as scabs, ruined the effectiveness of the strike and incited aggressive behavior. The militia was forced to step in and shut down the strike.

== Leading causes ==
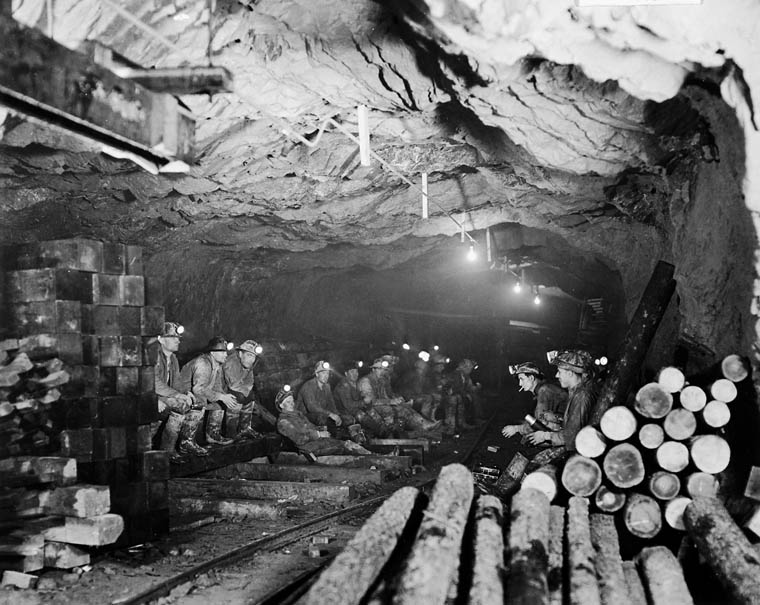
These are miners having lunch in an entry level shaft in Ontario, Canada

The miners were unhappy with how much they were getting paid. Men recruited each other to work in order to support their families. Men, grandfathers, and even boys worked for little pay and in an unsafe environment. The pay was so small that families would even send their boys who were under the age of sixteen to work in the mines. They would hide their age from local officials, because the need for money was so great. The mines were designed to mine as quickly as possible, prioritizing quantity of production rather than mining in a safe and effective manner. Wages were inconsistent and subject to change every year. There was no baseline pay, and miners' salaries could change based on demand for coal and other factors, which created a feeling of agitation. The companies kept down wages by importing colliers from East Asia who were willing to work for less instead of investing in technology which would have made workers more productive.

In addition to their disgruntlement about the low pay, miners held resentment from previous gas explosions. Within the 30 years leading up to the strike, 373 men died. Replacement workers were supposed to come and help ease the workload, but they never came.

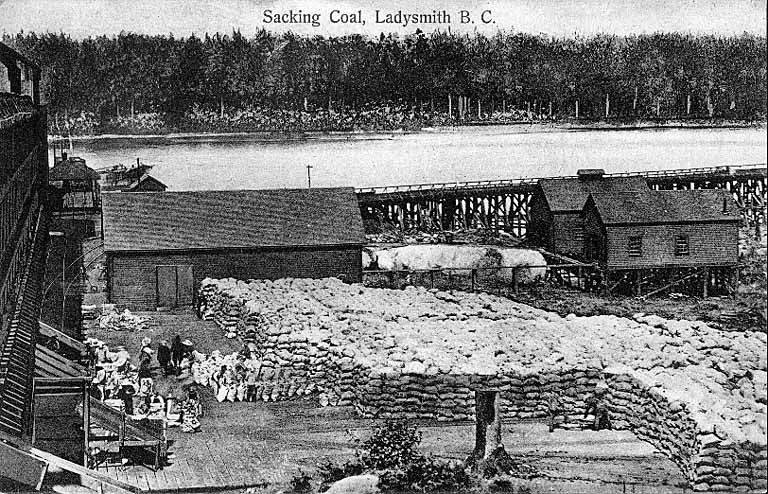
Miners load coal into sacks for sale at Ladysmith, BC

The unsafe working conditions were ignored. One worker, Oscar Mottishaw, who was a leader in the United Mine Workers of America (UMWA), reported unsafe working conditions at the Canadian Collieries, in Cumberland. He was then fired. Upset by this, the miners decided to take a two-day holiday to discuss what actions to take next. When they returned to work after two days off, they found that they had been locked out. The miners were now out of work. 3700 miners were fired. They repeatedly requested to civilly meet with the Dunsmuir family, but were denied. The strikers decided to go on a holiday until Mottishaw was re-hired. This holiday turned into a strike that lasted almost two years, and expanded to all the mines from Ladysmith to Cumberland.

== Mining companies involved ==
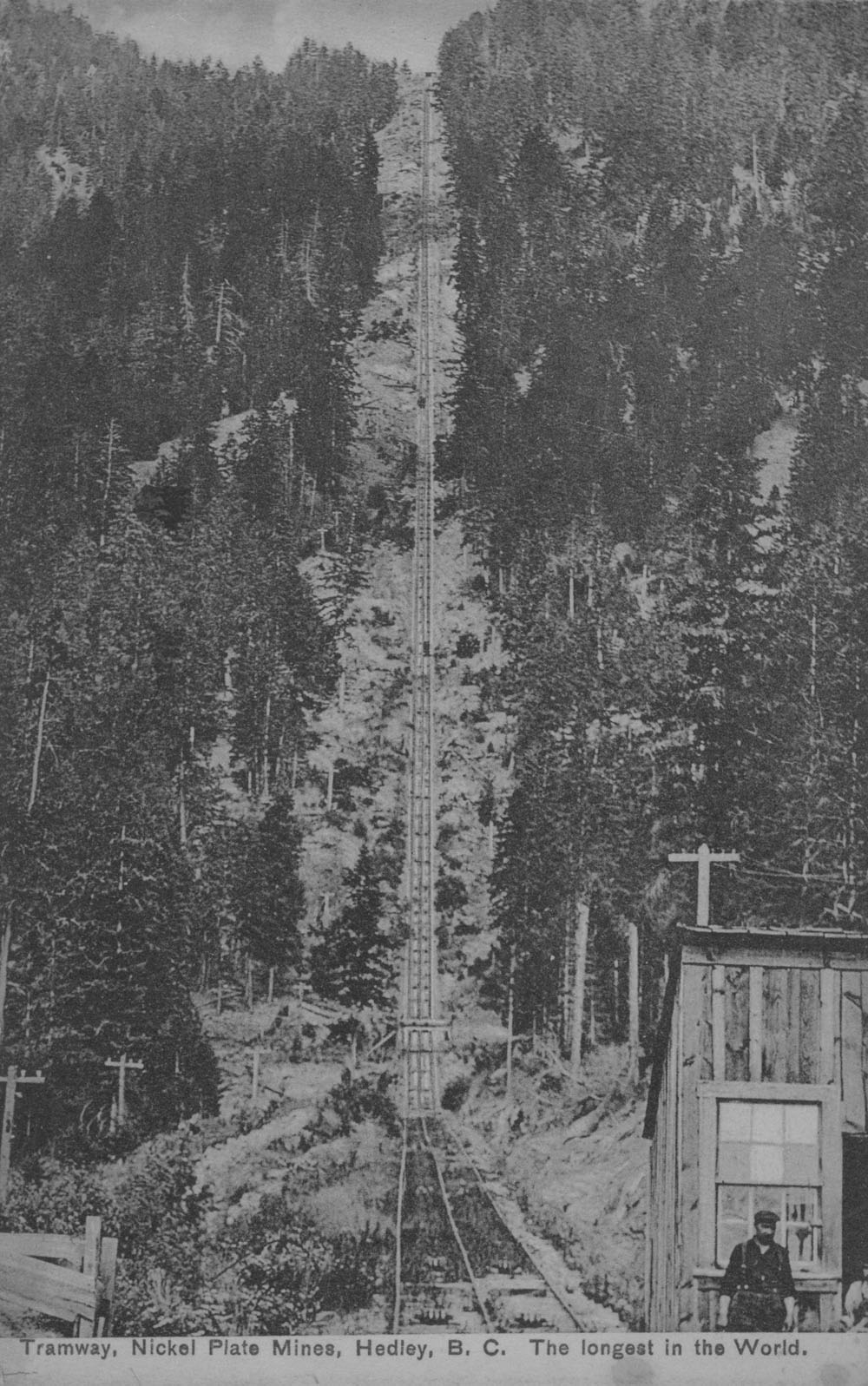
This is the Nickel Plate Mine tramway of the Hedley Gold Mining Company in British Columbia

The mining companies that were involved, and most prominent on Vancouver Island at the time, were: The Canadian Collieries (Dunsmuir) Limited, the Western Fuel of San Francisco, the Pacific Coast Collieries, and the Nanaimo Coal Company. The Canadian Collieries were based in Cumberland and Extension. Sold by the Dunsmuir family in 1910, the company's new owners played a significant role in the strike by firing a union leader with the last name "Mottishaw". This was one of the strike's leading causes. The Western Fuel of San Francisco was based in Nanaimo and owned many of the mines there. The Pacific Coast Collieries only had minor involvement, and were located in South Wellington. The Nanaimo Coal Company stands apart from the other three, as it was the sole company to "sign an agreement with the union."

These mining companies (excluding the Nanaimo Coal Company) were opposed to the unions, because they were a threat to the coal companies' power and authority. They coal companies were also dealing with the competition from fuel oil. Because of the potential replacement of coal as fuel with oil as fuel, they worked the miners extra hard and with less pay. This was in an effort to keep up with fuel oil and to stay in business. They needed to pay workers less in order to make a profit. However, unions demanded more pay, causing an issue for the coal companies. They did not want to increase the miners' pay, at the risk of losing their business, and of the entire coal mining industry being replaced by an alternate fuel source. They also had the support of the government, because the economy was so dependent upon the coal industry.

== The strike ==
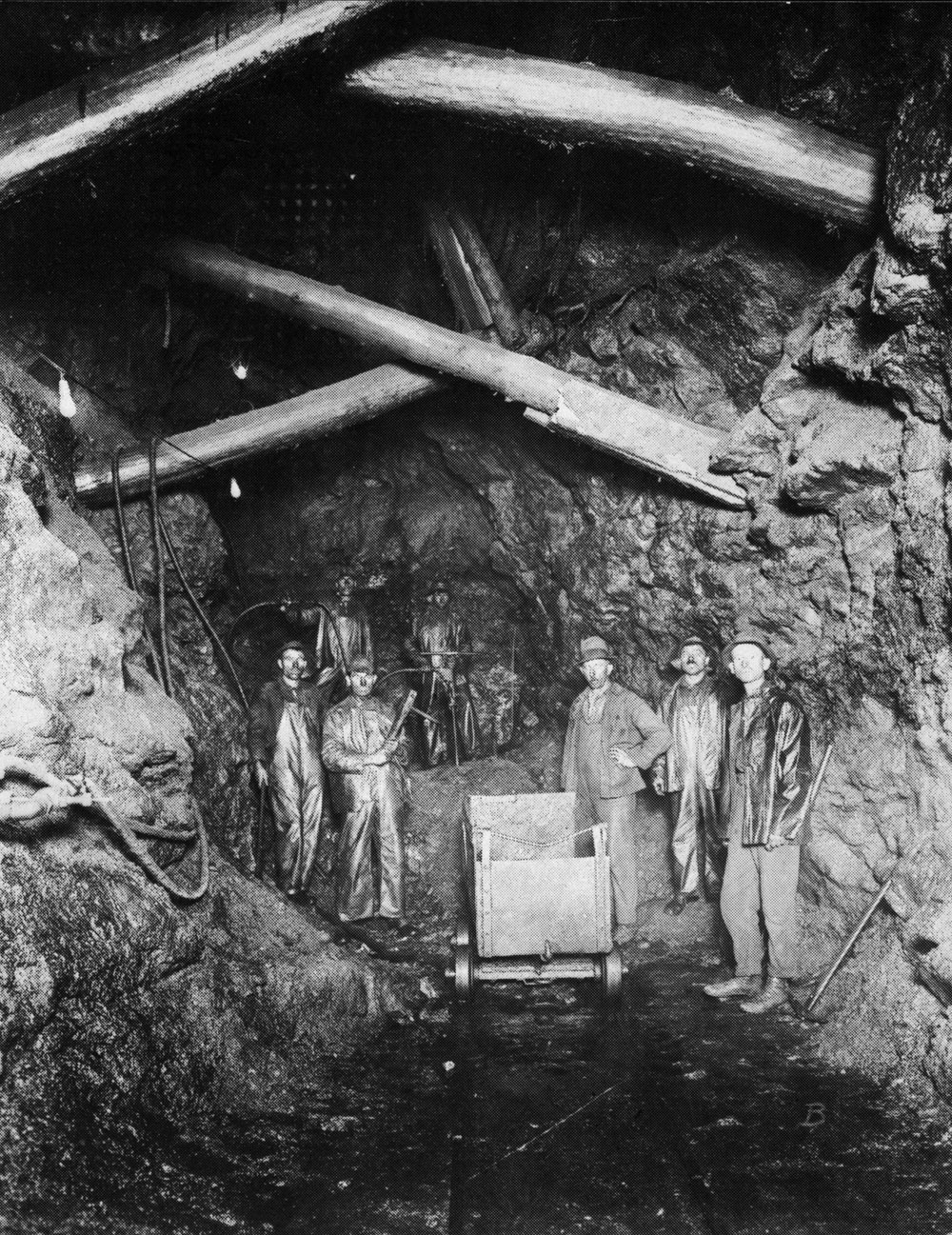
This is the interior of the Black Donald Mine shaft under Whitefish Lake under the direction of the Black Donald Graphite Company located in Ontario, Canada. Harsh conditions made the mines unstable, dirty, and dark.

The strike began peacefully, and occurred from Ladysmith to Cumberland. Many strikebreakers would hang out in Ladysmith during the daytime, and did not cause much commotion. The unions would provide the families with salaries, and women would work. The mines in Cumberland found ways around the strike, through the means of targeting Asian workers. The mines threatened to have the Asian workers deported if they did not break the strike. This forced them to continue working for the mines, and also angered the strikers. Eventually, as strikebreakers continued going to work, the strike became un-effective. After two years of striking, the strikebreakers became a source of frustration to the strikers, and strikers began to threaten or hurt scabs on their way to work.

Eventually, the strikers' frustrations surpassed their desire to keep their protests peaceful, and the protests turned violent. Even people who were uninvolved in the strike wanted to join the excitement, which led to a dangerous riot in Ladysmith where many were injured and some died. Afterwards, the strikers resumed peaceful protesting. However the government still called in the militia to end the strike. Unions ran out of money to pay salaries, and Canada's entry into the war in Europe offered the miners new jobs in the army; the 23-month strike died in 1914.
