= Kent Rowley =

Canadian labour organizer (1917–1978)

Kent Rowley (1917–1978) was a Canadian labour organizer. He is best known for helping establish and lead the Confederation of Canadian Unions alongside Madeleine Parent.

Born in Montreal, Rowley became a labour activist as a young man. He opposed conscription in the early years of World War II and was held at an internment camp in Petawawa, Ontario from 1940 to 1942. In 1943, he was hired by the United Textile Workers of America, for whom he was a Canadian director. He was jailed for strike activities during the 1946 Montreal Cottons strike at Valleyfield, Quebec. In the early 1950s, he was dismissed by the UTWA as part of a crackdown on leftist union officers. Rowley and his future wife Parent organized the Canadian Textile and Chemical Union, an independent union which operated primarily in Ontario. Unhappy with the labour establishment and its close relationship with conservative unions based in the United States, Rowley and Madeleine Parent founded the Confederation of Canadian Unions in 1969. Mainstream unions subsequently demanded more autonomy from their American headquarters, and several major unions broke away to form separate Canadian unions, although few joined the CCU.

Rowley was married to Parent from 1953 until his death in 1978. A biography of Rowley by Rick Salutin was published in 1980.
