= Toronto Typographical Union =

Former Canadian union

- Abbreviation: TTU
- Formation: 1832 or 1844
- Type: Trade union
- Location: Ontario, Canada
- Parent organization: International Typographical Union (from 1866)
- Formerly called: Toronto Typographical Society

The Toronto Typographical Union (TTU) was an early Canadian trade union in the printing industry. First organized in 1832, it came to prominence in 1872 when it organized a major strike in Toronto. Membership declined in the mid- to late 20th century as printing turned digital. By 1994, TTU had been absorbed by the Communications, Energy and Paperworkers Union of Canada.

== Origins ==
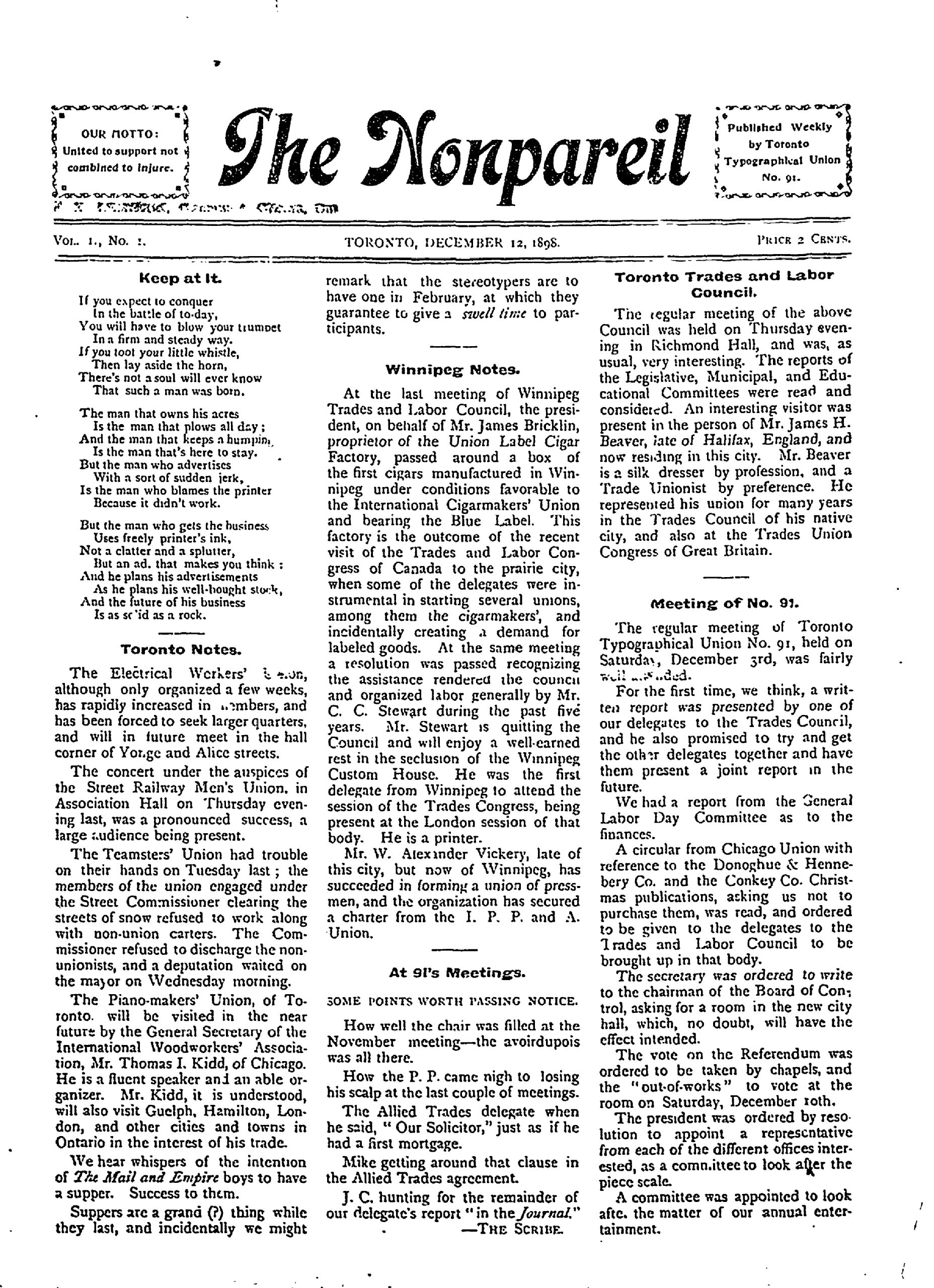
First issue of The Nonpareil, a newspaper of the Toronto Typographical Union, 1898

The association that would become the Toronto Typographical Union was first organized in 1832 as the York Typographical Union. (Note: At that time, the city now known as Toronto was called York. It would become Toronto in 1834, just two years after the York Typographical Union was founded.) This association, which was renamed the Toronto Typographical Society in 1835, survived only to 1837. It was reorganized in 1844 to counter newspaper publisher George Brown's efforts to lower printing workers' wages.

In May 1866, the then–Toronto Typographical Society joined the National Typographical Union to become, officially, Toronto Typographical Union No. 91. The National Typographical Union, organized beginning in December 1850, was based in the United States. Zerker argues that, as a consequence, TTU came under "foreign domination". Burr suggests that this overstates the point, as TTU's members in Toronto supported its move to become a local of the American organization.

== 1872 printers' strike ==
Among other activities, TTU is known for its role in organizing a strike on March 25, 1872, known as the Toronto printers' strike. The historian Robert H. Babcock describes it as "one of the most important events in Canadian labour history". TTU organized the strike as part of the Nine-Hour Movement for a workday of nine hours, a demand that unions in Britain and the United States (in the latter case, for an eight-hour workday), were making around the same time.

TTU and the print workers it represented announced their demand for a nine-hour day, with no accompanying pay cut, on March 13, 1872. Their bosses—then still known as master printers—refused the offer on March 19, with one exception. James Beaty, a Conservative politician and editor of the Toronto Leader, accepted TTU's demands and even wrote in favour of their cause. The strike began on March 25. George Brown, publisher of The Globe (now The Globe and Mail), vehemently opposed the strike, and arranged for the arrest of its leaders.

Strike supporters rallied again in large numbers at Queen's Park on April 15, 1872. Twenty-three TTU organizers were arrested for conspiracy on April 16, and a trial began on April 18. At the time, Canadian law made no exception for unions to the general common law rules governing the crime of conspiracy: a union committee's "conspiracy" to disrupt a commercial enterprise with a strike was no different in law from any other agreement to disturb the peace. The organizers were accordingly convicted.

Shortly after the Queen's Park rally, Prime Minister John A. MacDonald introduced the Trade Unions Act, 1872, in the House of Commons, which made certain forms of union activity legal. The act was based on two statutes that had recently been adopted in Britain: the Trade Union Act 1871 and Criminal Law Amendment Act 1871. It passed on June 14, 1872.

== Decline ==
The rise of computer-based printing in the 1960s and 1970s largely rendered manual typesetting obsolete. Accordingly, TTU membership declined precipitously during this period, beginning with a lengthy newspaper strike that began in 1964. As of January 1978, TTU had just over 1,300 members. The union was still active in Mississauga as of 1987, when it won a settlement on behalf of 30 workers at Burlington Air Express (now BAX Global) at the Ontario Labour Relations Board. It had become a local of the Communications, Energy and Paperworkers Union of Canada by 1994.

== See also ==
- History of Toronto
