= Madeleine Parent =

Canadian activist (1918–2012)

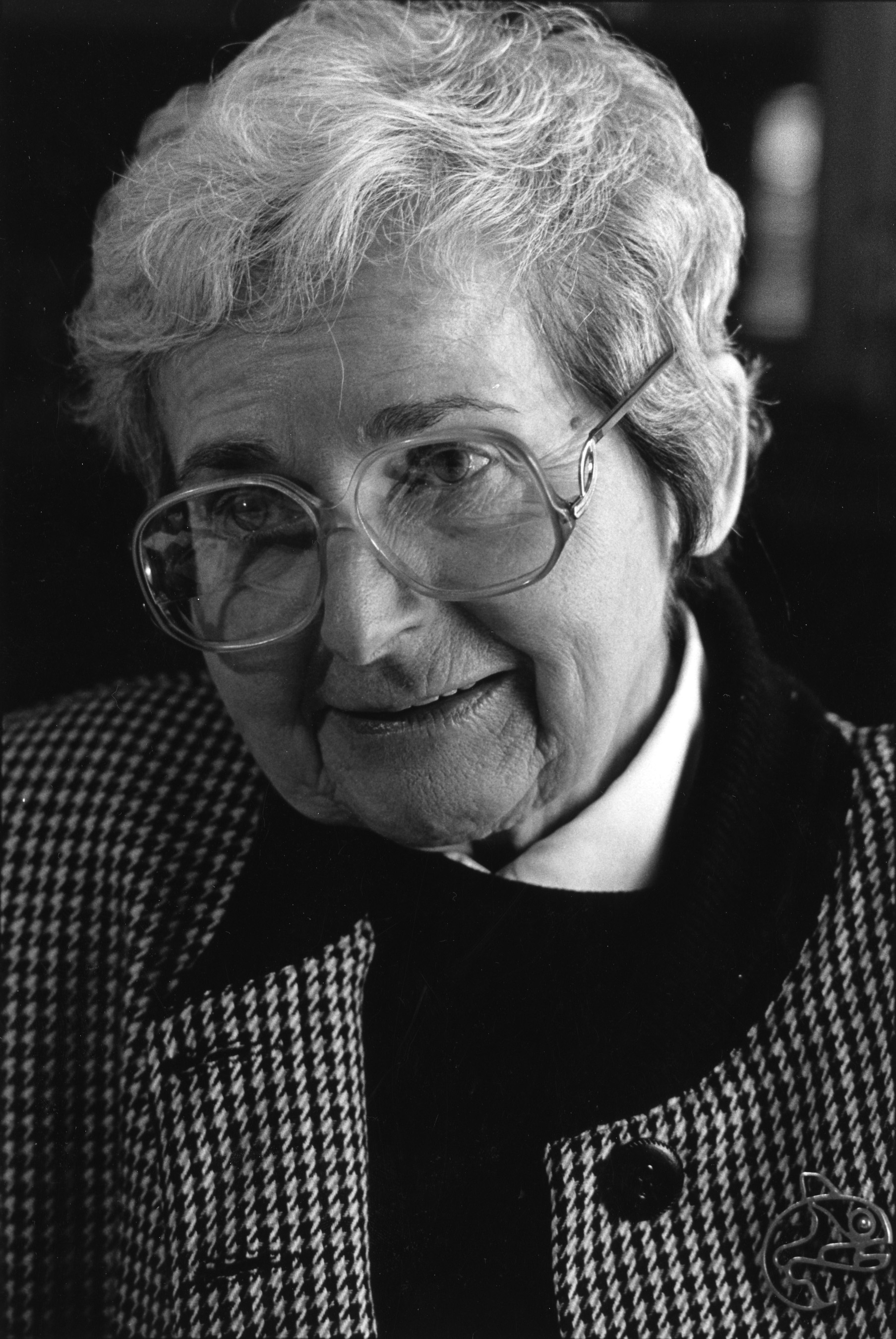
- Parent in 1991
- Born: June 23, 1918; Montreal, Quebec, Canada
- Died: March 12, 2012 (aged 94); Montreal, Quebec, Canada
- Education: McGill University

Madeleine Parent (French: [madlɛn paʁɑ̃]; June 23, 1918 – March 12, 2012) was a Canadian labour, women's and aboriginal rights activist. A longtime feminist, Parent's achievements included her work in establishing the Canadian Textile and Chemical Union and the Confederation of Canadian Unions alongside her partner and fellow trade unionist Kent Rowley. She was a prominent figure in the 1946 Montreal Cottons strike.

Retiring from union work in 1983 to Montreal, Parent continued her social activist role, focusing on women's rights. She became a founding member of the National Action Committee on the Status of Women (NAC) and played an active role in addressing issues faced by immigrant and Aboriginal women.

In 1955, she was arrested for seditious conspiracy by the provincial government of Maurice Duplessis. After a six-month incarceration, she was acquitted.

== Early life ==
Born in Montreal, Quebec in 1918, she was the daughter of Marie-Anne Rita Forest and J.B. Parent. Parent received her early education in French at the L'Académie St. Urbain, the Villa-Maria School and in English at the Trafalgar School for Girls. She then attended McGill University, graduating with a B.A. in 1940. During her McGill years, she took part in her first collective action through the Canadian Students Assembly (CSA) campaign to seek financial aid for students in need. She also met Val Bjarnason, a student from British Columbia, at a CSA conference, and married him in 1941.

== Career ==
By 1942, she was the secretary of the Montreal Trades and Labour Council organizing committee. In 1943, she began working with Kent Rowley for the United Textile Workers of America (UTW), in Quebec. By 1946, 6,000 textile workers, organized into a union by Rowley and Parent, engaged in a strike against Dominion Textile in Salaberry-de-Valleyfield and Montreal. These activities engendered a strong reaction from the provincial government of Maurice Duplessis against Parent, including arrests, legal proceedings for seditious conspiracy and charges that she was a communist.

In 1952, in the midst of another strike in Valleyfield, the international UTWA pushed Parent and Rowley out of the union. Afterwards, both Parent and Rowley eschewed the United States-led international union movement in favour of Canadian-based unions. Parent joined with Kent Rowley to found the Canadian Textile Council (CTC) in 1952 that later became the Canadian Textile and Chemical Union (CTCU). Rowley was the President of the union with Madeleine Parent as Secretary-Treasurer. In 1953, the two married. In 1969, they became founding members of the Council of Canadian Unions that latter became the Confederation of Canadian Unions (CCU), in which Rowley served as Secretary-Treasurer until his death in 1978. Madeleine Parent's post-1967 union work was focused mainly in Ontario. She served as the Secretary-Treasurer of the CTCU, as well as the Eastern Vice-President of the CCU. The union activities also served as a vehicle for Parent's engagement in issues such as equal pay for equal work.

Retiring from union work in 1983 to Montréal, Madeleine Parent continued her social activist role, focusing on women's rights. She became a founding member of the National Action Committee on the Status of Women (NAC) and has played an active role in addressing issues faced by immigrant and Aboriginal women.

== Commemoration ==
The public place located next to the former Montreal Cotton Company in Valleyfield was named Madeleine-Parent Space in her honour.

Madeleine Parent's efforts in organizing workers and fighting for labour rights have made an indelible contribution to the Canadian labour movement. This, in addition to her work for social justice including women's rights, has been recognized through honorary degrees from several Canadian universities including her alma mater, McGill University, in 2002.

The Montreal Southwest Borough announced that it would spend CDN $1.6 million for a parcel of property along the Lachine Canal to turn into a park in Parent's name. The park was inaugurated on September 17, 2016.

The bridge carrying Quebec Autoroute 30 over the Beauharnois Canal was named Madeleine Parent Bridge in her honour.

In September 2023, Parent was one of three Quebec feminists and trade unionists, along with Léa Roback and Simonne Monet-Chartrand, honoured by Canada Post with a postage stamp.

In 2025, the Société de transport de Montréal announced that Parent had been chosen as the namesake for one of the five new stations on the Blue Line.
