= Confederation of Canadian Unions =

Trade union centre

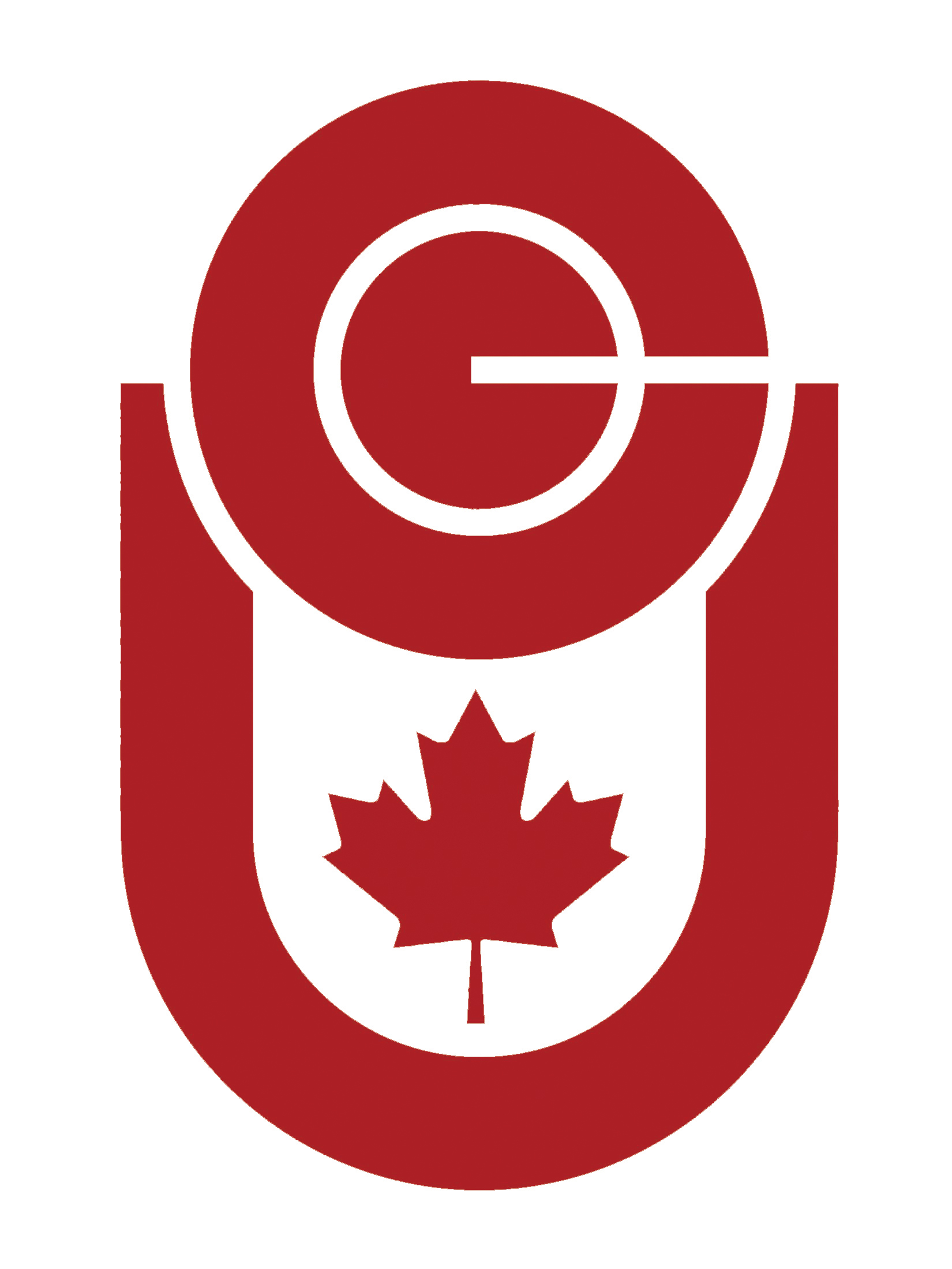
- Abbreviation: CCU
- Formation: 1969
- Founders: Madeleine Parent; Kent Rowley
- Type: Trade union centre
- Headquarters: Toronto, Ontario, Canada
- Location: Canada
- Members: 10,478
- President: Gregory Ball
- Website: www.ccu-csc.ca
- Formerly called: Council of Canadian Unions

The Confederation of Canadian Unions (CCU; French: Confédération des syndicats canadiens [CSC]) is a national trade union centre, a central labour body of independent unions in Canada.

== History ==
The Council of Canadian Unions was founded in 1969 by militant labour organizers Madeleine Parent and Kent Rowley. The pair sought to establish a democratic, independent Canadian labour movement free of the influence of American-based international unions. At the July 1973 convention, the organization took its present name. Founded as part of the New Left, it has been a leader in the struggle for workers' rights and social justice for all Canadians and was the first labour federation in Canada to call for equal pay for work of equal value.

In January 1978, CCU had a membership of 26,007 across 13 unions. This totalled 0.8% of all workers in Canada.

In 2013, the Construction Maintenance and Allied Workers (CMAW) affiliated with the CCU.

In 2016, the Association of Employees Supporting Education Services (AESES) affiliated with the CCU.

In April 2018, the Canadian Union of Skilled Workers (CUSW) voted unanimously to affiliate with the CCU.

== Activities ==
The CCU supports, participates and works co-operatively with a variety of social activist groups, including the Canadian Centre for Policy Alternatives, the Maquila Solidarity Network, Council of Canadians, the International Civil Liberties Monitoring Group (ICLMG), various health coalitions, Make Poverty History, and Gathering Place. It writes submissions and lobbies all levels of government on issues such as health care, education, pay equity, social services, forestry, fair trade, and labour standards for workers.

The Confederation of Canadian Unions also supports affiliates during labour disputes, difficult economic times and has established a travel pool to assist affiliates with travel expenses to ensure the greatest amount of participation by members and bottom-up democracy.

The CCU and its affiliates are active in the struggle for a new world based on the ideals equality, democracy, environmental sustainability and solidarity. It also regularly lobbies elected officials on policy matters relating to workers' rights and social justice issues.

For each provincial and federal election in Canada, the CCU organizes its "Raise Your Voice, Cast Your Vote" campaign, a voter education program where questionnaires are sent to each of the participating political parties that include questions on economic, social, environmental and political issues.

The CCU is currently applying to be a member of the International Trade Union Confederation.

== Objectives ==
1. Establish a just standard of income, working hours and conditions for all who work for a living;
2. Protect its members from illegal and unjust treatment;
3. Obtain improved legislation and just application of legislation in the interests of all workers;
4. Promote the study, defense, and just application of legislation in the interests of all workers;
5. Promote and develop awareness of the dangers of environmental pollution and to educate members about the need to control and prevent harm to our environment;
6. Promote the merger or affiliation of affiliated unions with related interest and principles;
7. Aid workers in their efforts to form independent, Canadian unions, and if necessary or requested, to regulate relations between employees and employers, including but not limited to the right to bargain collectively on their behalf and to act as a bargaining agent, after full review and concurrence of the Executive Board;
8. Aid in organizing the unorganized.

== Affiliated unions ==
- Nova Scotia Union of Public and Private Employees
- Canadian Overseas Telecommunications Union
- York University Staff Association
- Public and Private Workers of Canada
- Construction Maintenance and Allied Workers
- Association of Employees Supporting Education Services
- Canadian Union of Skilled Workers

== See also ==
- List of trade unions
- List of federations of trade unions
