= Welland Canal Riot =

Labour riots in Ontario, Canada (1842 to 1844)

- Part of the North American canal age
- Date: 1842-44
- Location: Province of Canada, British Empire
- Caused by: Labor surplus
- Methods: Rioting

Parties
Irish navvies	Police

Casualties
- 1845 Act for the Preservation of the Peace near Public Works

The Welland Canal Riot occurred in Ontario, Canada. Armed conflict among Irish workers made the Second Welland Canal construction a riot area from 1842 to 1844. The laborers were continuously attacking and counterattacking. The police force became involved to protect and arrest.

== Background ==
The Welland Canal was first completed in 1829 and is located in Ontario, Canada. It enabled ships to travel the waterways which connect Lake Ontario and Lake Erie. The construction of the Second Welland Canal was from 1841 to 1845. Several riots during construction of the Second Welland Canal were instigated by the Irish workers.

== Causes ==
In 1841, with the start of the construction for the Second Welland Canal, a labor surplus began in Canada with large numbers of southern Irish immigrants. The unemployed Irish immigrants left their home starving and preferred the labor of the public works along the Welland Canal. There was an abundance of these unruly laborers not adopting the Canadian standards. Their common ethnicity allowed them to collude together with united protests. The primary conflict along the canal was class riots among the Irishmen. There was conflict with wages, unemployment, and food shortage. The changes in the economy were so drastic for workers that they needed high wages due to the reduction of work. Work was limited and inconsistent, especially in the wintertime. The pay was low and the workers struggled to buy the necessities for their families. They decided they would sit outside of the canal worksite until they got work. Most of the immigrants did not have the resources to survive, nor could they go elsewhere for employment.

== Events ==
The Irish workers started to riot with each other. Two factions, men of County Cork and Connaught, were feuding with each other. Hostility between the two factions grew as they were trying to obtain work between each other. They would combine efforts to ensure their workers had jobs by “patrolling” the canal and “driving off any who tried to take a job”. However, each faction would then turn to violence while ensuring employment for their individual group. The fighting was constant and was “part of the way in which canallers organized their lives, membership in a faction dictating both working and living arrangements”.

== Riots ==
From December 1842 through January 1843 in Broad Creek, Ontario, fighting among Welland Canal workers occurred between the Corkmen and Connaughtmen. Armed with pitch forks, pistols, guns, and swords, they fought each other in the streets. For revenge on the Corkmen, the Connaughtmen stole weapons from blacksmith shops along the canal. During the Welland Canal faction riot in December 1843 in Allanburg, Corkmen and Connaughtmen clashed while they drank and “accosted” bystanders. The Corkmen present avenged an earlier defeat by the Connaughtmen. In December 1843 at Thorold, Welland Canal rioting occurred when the two factions beat each other with pikes and poles, and attacked innocent people nearby. Police sought to arrest offenders.

== Outcomes ==
The Board of Works condemned rioters for dismantling construction schedules and costs. Rioters were banned from public works projects and spent time in jail as the Board attempted to stop disturbances. The Board of Works secured the passage of the 1845 Act for the Preservation of the Peace near Public Works, said to be "the first in a long series of regulatory acts directed solely at controlling canal and railway workers throughout the nineteenth century”. This act was for the prevention of riots and violence, such as strikers' picket lines, at and near Public Works under construction. Also, rioters were not allowed to have any type of weapon in their possession. The act also allowed police forces to be on site. The Board sought to suppress riots and provide protection for workers willing to work due to its responsibility to help contractors meet deadlines.

== See also ==
- List of incidents of civil unrest in Canada
