= Battle of Ballantyne Pier =

1935 labor conflict in Vancouver, Canada

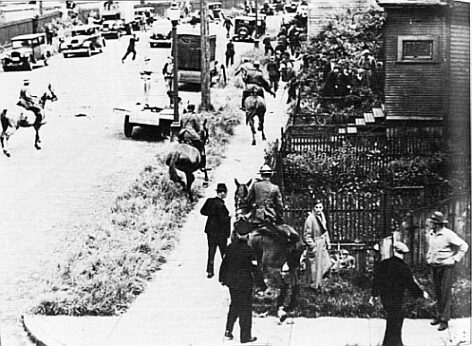
- Mounted police chasing protestors through Vancouver's East End during the Battle of Ballantyne Pier
- Date: 18 June 1935
- Location: Vancouver, British Columbia, Canada

Parties
	Royal Canadian Mounted Police; British Columbia Provincial Police; Vancouver Police Department

Lead figures
Michael James O'Rourke	William Wasbrough Foster

Number
Around 1,000 protesters	Unknown number of law enforcement

Casualties and losses
"Dozens" wounded 24 arrested	"Dozens" wounded

The Battle of Ballantyne Pier occurred in Ballantyne Pier during a docker's strike in Vancouver, British Columbia, in June 1935.

The strike can be traced back to 1912 when the International Longshoremen's Association (ILA), began organizing the waterfront workers in Canada, alongside the Lumber Handlers' Union in Vancouver. Going head to head with the employers association, the Shipping Federation, several strikes resulting in wage increases were won by workers in the coming years. Victories on the waterfront increased over the next decade, and by 1923, the Shipping Federation became determined to break the power of the ILA.

In October 1923, 1,400 striking dockworkers joined picket lines at the Vancouver waterfront. The Shipping Federation had arranged that the dockers would be met by 350 men armed with shotguns. They had been housed on a nearby ship. The gunmen's intimidation of the strikers, coupled with the fact that ships were being loaded and unloaded by numerous non-union workers, caused the strike to collapse two months later.

The 1923 strike destroyed the ILA, and it was soon replaced by a new organization, the Vancouver and District Waterfront Workers' Association (VDWWA). Set up originally by the bosses as a company union, the VDWWA soon took a confrontational stance towards the Shipping Federation. By 1935, nearly every port in British Columbia had been organised by the VDWWA. Following the pretext to the destruction of the ILA, the Shipping Federation provoked a major strike in the spring of 1935, locking out 50 dockers at the port at Powell River.

The strike snowballed with other dockers across the region striking or being locked out. Following a refusal to unload ships coming from Powell River, 900 workers were met with a lockout in Vancouver. Dockers across the border in Seattle also refused to unload ships coming from Vancouver and Powell River because they were staffed by non-union workers.

On June 18, several weeks after the original lockout, 900-1,100 dockers and their supporters marched through Vancouver towards Ballantyne Pier where non-union workers were unloading ships. The strikers were met at the pier by several hundred armed policemen. Attempting to force their way through, the dockers were attacked by the police lines. Many marchers were clubbed as they tried to run to safety, while many others tried hopelessly to fight back, using whatever weapons they could find.

Aided by Mounties who had been posted nearby, the police attacked the strikers. The VDWWA union hall was attacked, with tear gas being used against members of the women's auxiliary who had set up a first aid station inside. The battle lasted three hours, and included police firing guns at strikers. The battle produced several hospitalizations, including that of a fleeing striker who was shot in the back of his legs.

Despite the violence of June 18, the strike dragged on into December, but the strike lost much of its militant character after the fighting at Ballantyne Pier. The struggle to form a union completely independent of the Shipping Federation continued for another two years, when, in 1937, the International Longshore and Warehouse Union (ILWU) was born.

The strike of 1935 failed, however, it helped the future founding of a union for the dockers of British Columbia that was completely independent of the employers' association. The ILWU participated in numerous disputes in the following years, and in the 1940s, it won many strikes that lead to better pay and conditions for waterfront workers.

== Background ==
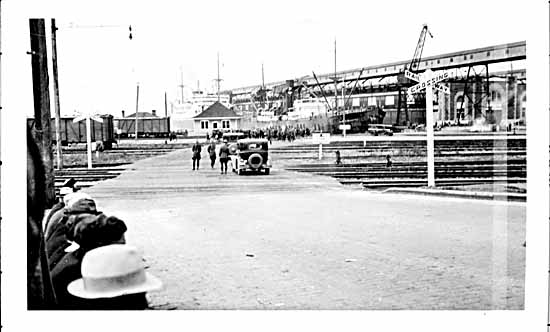
Police guarding the Heatley Street entrance to the pier, shortly before the riot.

The Vancouver and District Waterfront Workers' Association (VDWWA) was established as a company union following a defeated longshoremen's strike in 1923, replacing the International Longshoremen's Association. Communist organizers with the Workers' Unity League (WUL) managed to seize control of the VDWWA's executive a decade later and transformed it into a militant union, which then began working towards strike action. A strike, more accurately a lock-out, finally commenced on 27 May 1935. That was several months after an agreement had been reached between the union and the Shipping Federation of British Columbia, but the terms were unfavourable to the longshoremen.

In late May, union membership voted to take over the despatching of work gangs on the harbour to load and unload ships as required. Despatching was a key issue for longshoremen, and prior to the 1923 strike had been carried out by the union. Longshoremen claimed that the Shipping Federation of British Columbia, an employers' association of waterfront-based companies and the main employer on the docks, unfairly discriminated against workers. Especially targeted were those considered sympathetic to an independent union or simply disliked by the despatcher, making the allocation of work a punitive mechanism and the job itself insecure. When the union unilaterally took over despatching, the Federation claimed that it was a violation of their agreement and locked out the longshoremen. Replacement workers, known pejoratively as "scabs" by strikers, were mobilized along with hundreds of police specials, who were recruited to break the strike.

== Anti-communist context ==
Meanwhile, nearly 2,000 relief camp workers flooded into Vancouver on 4 April 1935. These were unemployed men protesting the conditions of the federal relief camps that were set up as a stop-gap solution to the unemployment crisis by the Department of Defence. Camp inmates were also organized under the Workers' Unity League into the Relief Camp Workers' Union. Communist leaders were attempting to merge the two strikes and spark a general strike. The Shipping Federation and the police were aware of the plan and claimed it was an attempt to start a Bolshevik revolution on the Pacific Coast. Thus, when the waterfront strike finally began, tensions were already high between anticommunists and strikers.

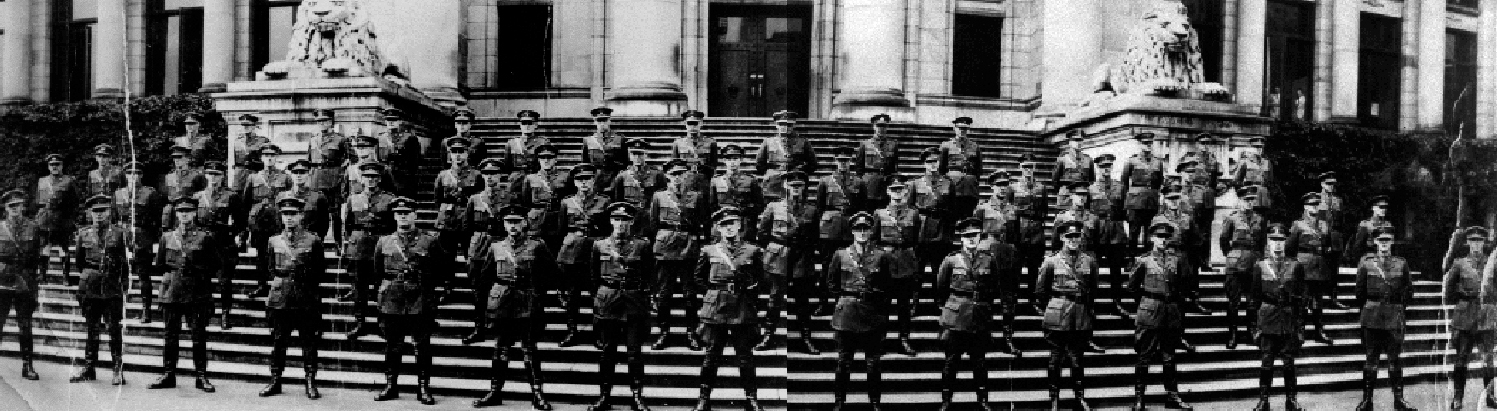
One contingent of police specials recruited to police the 1935 longshoremen's strike, posing outside the court house, now the Vancouver Art Gallery.

Historians agree that both strikes were driven by legitimate grievances: abysmal conditions in the relief camps and despatching and other workplace issues on the waterfront. Nevertheless, a massive mobilization that included all three levels of police, with specials attached to each police force, took place in anticipation of an attempted revolution. Specials trained at the Beatty Street Drill Hall under Brigadier-General Victor Odlum and Colonel C.E. Edgett and were co-ordinated by a group called the Citizens' League of British Columbia, a vigilante organization funded by the Shipping Federation. Militia units based in the Point Grey neighbourhood of Vancouver and in Victoria, British Columbia were also ready to be called to action on short notice. The Point Grey militia, however, consisted of inmates of a specially designated relief camp, and many of them eventually joined the relief camp strikers.

The communist plan to merge the strikes and spark a general strike failed except for a one-day demonstration commemorating May Day. On 3 June 1935, shortly after the waterfront strike began, the relief camp strikers left the city to begin the On-to-Ottawa Trek in an effort to take their grievance to the nation's capital. Nevertheless, the authorities persisted in conflating the waterfront strike with revolution, perhaps because they were alarmed by the waterfront strike in the United States the previous year that had shut down most shipping operations along the American coast and culminated in a bloody general strike in San Francisco.

== The battle ==
On 18 June 1935, about 1,000 protesters, consisting of striking longshoremen and their supporters, marched towards the Heatley Street entrance to Ballantyne Pier, where strikebreakers were unloading ships in the harbour.

Unlike earlier waterfront strikes, longshoremen were prevented from picketing the docks to discourage strikebreaking and claimed that they were going to go en masse to talk to the non-union workers. They were led by Victoria Cross recipient Mickey O'Rourke and a contingent of World War I veterans and marched behind a Union Jack flag, to great symbolic effect. At the entrance to the pier, they were met by Chief Constable Colonel W. W. Foster, who warned the demonstrators that they would not be permitted to proceed. When they refused to turn back, protesters were attacked with clubs by the police guarding the pier.

Within minutes, more police joined in the fight. In addition to the Vancouver police, contingents from the British Columbia Provincial Police, who had been hiding behind boxcars, and the Royal Canadian Mounted Police engaged with demonstrators. The police chased the dispersing crowd, continuing to club people even as they fled and fired tear gas. Many protesters fought back, throwing rocks and other projectiles at the police, and others who were attacked were simply trying to flee the scene.

That continued for three hours and spread throughout the nearby residential district. Several people, both police and protesters, were hospitalized as a result of the riot, and one bystander was shot in the back of his legs by a police shotgun. Offices of communist organizers and the longshoremen's union were also raided, with tear gas shot through the windows to drive out any occupants before the police entered. Strike supporters set up a makeshift hospital at the Ukrainian Hall, and the police did the same for their wounded at the Coroner's Court on Cordova Street. In total, 28 out of the 60 injured were hospitalized and 24 men were arrested. Mayor Gerry McGeer declared that striking longshoremen would no longer be eligible for relief payments for themselves or their families.

== Outcome ==
The Battle of Ballantyne was the bloody climax of a very volatile year in Vancouver, but fell far short of the insurrection anticipated by the police and anticommunists. It was also a turning point in the waterfront strike, which, although it dragged on until December, lost its optimistic and militant character after the battle. Longshoremen, however, would continue to fight for the right to organize an independent union and to control dispatching, and finally succeeded a decade later when they formed the International Longshore and Warehouse Union (ILWU), Local 500.

It was also the last of WUL militancy that Vancouver would witness. That same year, the Comintern in Moscow abandoned its Third Period strategy, which entailed the creation of the Workers' Unity League and similar militant trade union organizations in other countries with the goal of building a radical labour movement separate from mainstream labour organizations. Under the new Popular Front strategy, Communists joined established unions and helped to build the Congress of Industrial Organizations. Moreover, Communist priorities shifted from the industrial to the political arena, where they fielded candidates and supported Cooperative Commonwealth Federation candidates, while others joined the Mackenzie-Papineau Battalion to fight Franco's fascists in the Spanish Civil War.

Like the Regina Riot that ended the On-to-Ottawa Trek that same year, the Battle of Ballantyne Pier was part of the fierce, and perhaps paranoid, anticommunist reaction to Communists and militant workers' movements that they led. The Conservative government of R.B. Bennett lost support because of its mishandling of depression-era unrest in such events, which led to Bennett's defeat in the federal election that same year. Although machine guns were not used in the riot, another First World War technology was introduced in Vancouver policing that day: tear gas. Another major clash between the unemployed and the police took place in 1938. On Bloody Sunday, relief camp workers were violently evicted from the main Vancouver Post Office by means of tear gas bombs and police clubs (primarily wielded by the Royal Canadian Mounted Police in that instance).

== See also ==
- List of incidents of civil unrest in Canada
- 1918 Vancouver general strike
- Estevan Riot
- On-to-Ottawa Trek
