= Sir Charles Tupper Secondary School =

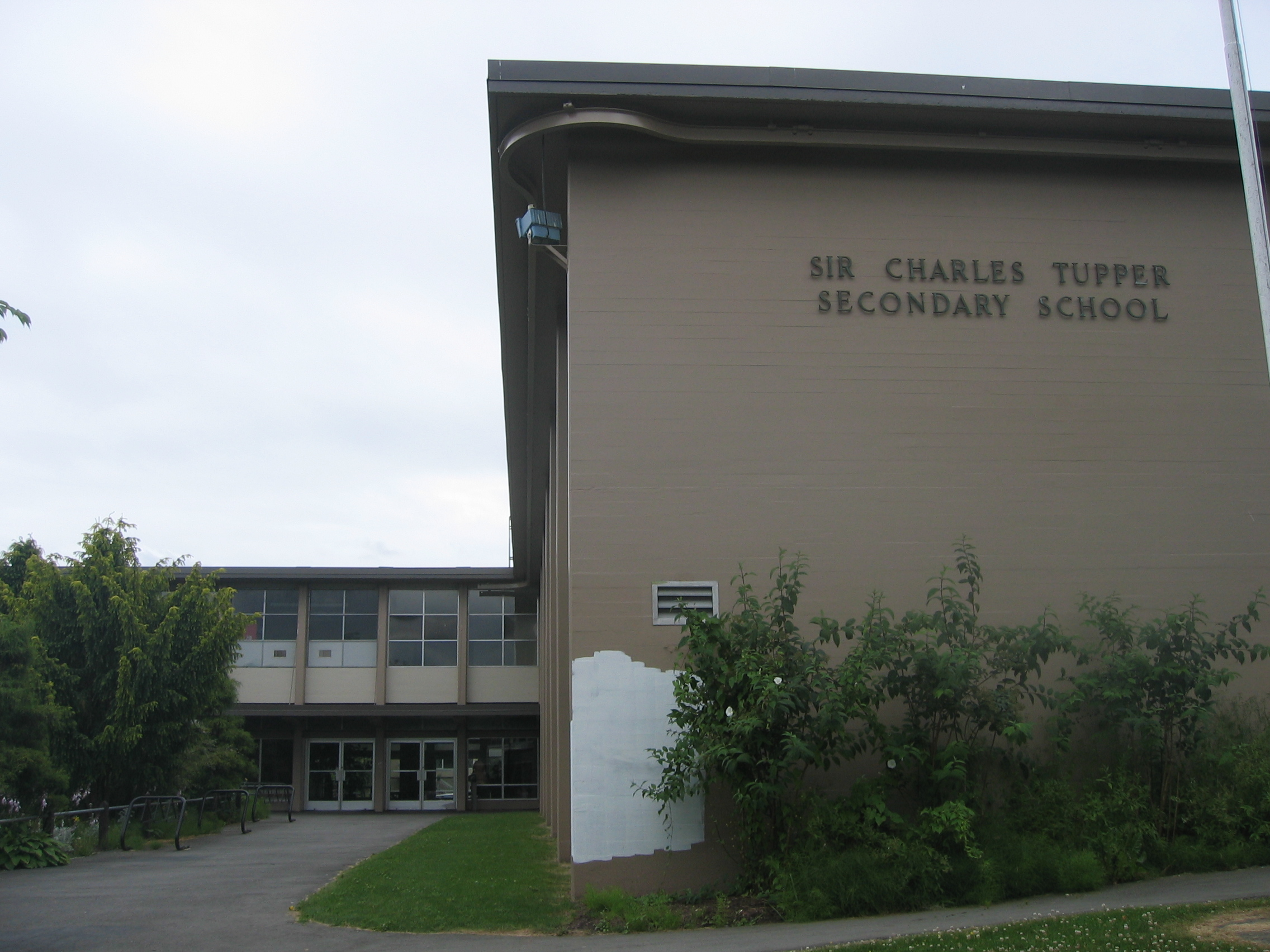

Location
- 419 East 24th Avenue; Vancouver, British Columbia, V5V 2A2; Canada; 49.2497°N 123.0954°W

Information
- School type: Secondary school
- Motto: Perseverantia Valemus (Through perseverance we prosper; Become worthwhile and worthy)
- Founded: 1959
- School board: School District 39 Vancouver
- Superintendent: Helen McGregor
- Area trustee: Preeti Faridkot
- Principal: Brent Schieman
- Grades: 8-12
- Enrollment: 1097 (2025/2026)
- Language: English
- Area: Riley Park-Little Mountain
- Colours: Scarlet and Gold
- Team name: Tigers
- Website: tupper.vsb.bc.ca
- Last updated: October 3rd, 2026

Sir Charles Tupper Secondary School is a public secondary school located in Vancouver, British Columbia, Canada.

== History ==
Opened in 1959, the school is named in honour of Sir Charles Tupper, Canada's 6th prime minister. Originally serving only grades 7, 8 and 9, the school grew to include grades 10, 11 and 12 by 1965.

On November 28, 2003, a 17-year-old student named Mao Jomar Lanot was beaten to death on the school grounds. A former student was later convicted and sentenced to 7 years in prison for his role in the attack. In the years since the killing, the culture of the school has changed dramatically, with students and staff embracing a new school code of conduct ROARS which advocates Respect, Ownership, Attitude, Responsibility, and Safety.

Today Tupper serves grades 8 through 12. On September 29, 2009, the school celebrated its 50th anniversary, with hosts Friends of Tupper Fund.

== Programs Offered ==
=== Mini School ===
Established in 2000, Tupper's Mini School Program seeks academically motivated students looking for a challenge in the learning environment. Mini students attend enriched academic courses, however classes such as Physical Education and various electives are spent with the main school body.

=== Tupper Tech ===
Tupper Tech provides career focused grade 12 students the opportunity to gain experience in the trades, while working towards a full time apprenticeship. Working on a Day 1 / Day 2 rotation, students rotate each day between "hands on" education and academic classes. Many students are cross enrolled within other schools in the district, spending one day at Tupper, while returning to their home school for academic classes. The program ended in 2024.

== Athletics ==
Sir Charles Tupper Secondary School is known for its outstanding athletic achievements. In 2009-2010, the school's Wrestling, Bantam Boys Basketball, Bantam Boys Volleyball team, and most notably the Senior Boys Basketball (who ended Kitsilano Secondary school's 8 year streak) were Vancouver City Champions for the VSSAA (Vancouver Secondary Schools' Athletic Association) League. There have been many notable accomplishments at the provincial level, as well as various past successes in sports over the years.

The school offers a wide variety of sports throughout the school year, including volleyball, rugby, cross country, and badminton in the fall, basketball and wrestling in the winter, and rugby, soccer, volleyball, softball, tennis, track and field, and ultimate frisbee in the spring/summer season.

In 2026, the senior boys' rugby team won the provincial AA championship for the first time since its inception.

== Timetable ==
- Tupper operates on a semester system, with four classes from September to late January and four classes from February to late June. Each day consists of four blocks, with classes beginning at 8:40 a.m. and ending at 3:05 p.m. On every day except Wednesday, there is a 40-minute time period called "Flexible Instructional Time (FIT)" that is built into the weekly schedule that allows students to either study for a test or exam, complete an assignment, or be offered assistance by teachers.

== Notable alumni ==
- Harjit Sajjan - Canadian Minister of National Defence (2015 - 2021)
- Derek Corrigan - Mayor of the City of Burnaby (2002 - 2018)
- Jim Chu - Chief Constable of the Vancouver Police Department (2007 - 2015)
- Mi-Jung Lee - Korean Canadian television personality, currently an anchor and producer at CTV British Columbia
- Dave McKay - Major League Baseball player (1975 - 1982)
- DJ Kemo, Juno-award winning DJ/ Producer
- Bindy Johal - Gangster
- Nathan Shaw aka Ekali (DJ) - Electronic music producer (2017–Present), formerly a member of Said the Whale, a Juno Award-winning Vancouver based indie rock band (2011 - 2016)
