= The Islands =

Provincial electoral district in British Columbia

The Islands was a provincial electoral district in the Canadian province of British Columbia. It first appeared on the hustings in the 1890 provincial election and lasted until it was integrated into the new riding Nanaimo and The Islands at the 1941 election.

== Notable MLAs ==
This Nanaimo-Gulf Islands area riding's first appearance was in 1903. It was originally created for the 1890 election, but was redistributed and done away with for the 1894 election, but it was brought back again in the large redistribution that set the stage for the watershed 1903 election, which ended the no-party era in the BC House. The Islands then lasted until the 1937 election, and subsequently parts of it became Nanaimo and the Islands, which was a riding in elections from 1941 to 1963, or in other Nanaimo-area electoral districts.

Parts of the area covered by The Islands are currently represented by various newer ridings:

- Nanaimo 1996–present
- Saanich North and the Islands (current)
- Saanich and the Islands (past)

== Electoral history ==
Note: Winners of each election are in bold.

10th British Columbia election, 1890
Party	Candidate	Votes	%	±	Expenditures
Government	**John Paton Booth**	**57**	**49.57%**	–	unknown
Government	Frederick Foord	28	24.35%	–	unknown
Opposition	Horatio John Robertson	30	26.09%	–	unknown
Total valid votes		115	100.00%		
Total rejected ballots					
Turnout		%			

For the 1890 election The Islands was redistributed between North Nanaimo, South Nanaimo and Cowichan-Alberni. It did not appear again until 1903:

10th British Columbia election, 1903
Party	Candidate	Votes	%	±	Expenditures
Conservative	Henry Wright Bullock	154	41.07%		unknown
**Liberal**	**Thomas Wilson Paterson**	**221**	**58.93%**		unknown
Total valid votes		375	100.00%		
Total rejected ballots					
Turnout		%			

11th British Columbia election, 1907
Party	Candidate	Votes	%	±	Expenditures
Socialist	William John Ledingham	11	3.03%	–	unknown
Conservative	**Albert Edward McPhillips**	**179**	**49.31%**		unknown
Liberal	Thomas Wilson Paterson	173	47.66%		unknown
Total valid votes		363	100.00%		
Total rejected ballots					
Turnout		%			

12th British Columbia election, 1909
Party	Candidate	Votes	%	±	Expenditures
Conservative	**Albert Edward McPhillips**	**270**	**56.60%**		unknown
Liberal	Percy Purvis	207	43.40%		unknown
Total valid votes		477	100.00%		
Total rejected ballots					
Turnout		%			

13th British Columbia election, 1912
Party	Candidate	Votes	%	±	Expenditures
Conservative	**Albert Edward McPhillips**	**345**	**75.66%**		
Independent Conservative	Percy Kent Winch	111	24.34%		
Total valid votes		456	100.00%		

14th British Columbia election, 1916
Party	Candidate	Votes	%	±	Expenditures
Conservative	William Wasbrough Foster	354	49.72%		unknown
**Liberal**	**Malcolm Bruce Jackson**	**358**	**50.28%**		unknown
Total valid votes		712	100.00%		
Total rejected ballots					
Turnout		%			

1920 British Columbia general election
Party	Candidate	Votes	%
Liberal	Malcolm Bruce Jackson	581	40.86
Conservative	George Clark	481	33.83
Soldier–Farmer	Lewis Adolphus de Vic Carey	360	25.32
Total valid votes		1,422	100.00

16th British Columbia election, 1924
Party	Candidate	Votes	%	±	Expenditures
Liberal	Malcolm Bruce Jackson	463	38.71%		unknown
Provincial	John William McIntosh	581	34.06%		unknown
Conservative	**Cyrus Wesley Peck**	**583**	**34.17%**		unknown
Total valid votes		1,706	100.00%		
Total rejected ballots					
Turnout		%			

17th British Columbia election, 1928
Party	Candidate	Votes	%	±	Expenditures
Liberal	Malcolm Bruce Jackson	683	37.30%		unknown
Conservative	**Cyrus Wesley Peck**	**1,148**	**62.70%**		unknown
Total valid votes		1,831	100.00%		
Total rejected ballots		44			
Turnout		%			

18th British Columbia election, 1933
Party	Candidate	Votes	%	±	Expenditures
Co-operative Commonwealth Fed.	William Ellis	400	19.47%		
Independent Conservative	William Wasbrough Foster	669	32.57%		
Non-Partisan Independent Group	John Bayley Hardinge	233	11.34%		
Independent	William Henry Russell Humber	26	1.27%		unknown
**Liberal**	**Alexander McDonald**	**726**	**35.35%**		unknown
Total valid votes		1,284	100.00%		
Total rejected ballots		34			
Turnout		%			

19th British Columbia election, 1937
Party	Candidate	Votes	%	±	Expenditures
Social Credit League	Gordon Hay Brown	51	2.41%		unknown
Conservative	**Macgregor Fullarton MacIntosh**	**953**	**45.12%**		unknown
Co-operative Commonwealth Fed.	Grace E. Burtt Martin	414	19.60%		unknown
Liberal	Alexander McDonald	694	32.86%		unknown
Total valid votes		2,112	100.00%		
Total rejected ballots		21			
Turnout		%			

In 1941, the area was redistributed into the new Nanaimo and the Islands riding. Parts of it are now in Saanich North and the Islands.
