= Malcolm Bruce Jackson =

Canadian politician

Member of the Legislative Assembly of British Columbia
- In office 1916–1924
- Preceded by: William Wasbrough Foster
- Succeeded by: Cyrus Wesley Peck
- Constituency: The Islands

Personal details
- Born: August 7, 1873 Woodville, Ontario, Canada
- Died: April 29, 1947 (aged 73) Victoria, British Columbia, Canada
- Party: British Columbia Liberal Party
- Spouse: Lilian Gertrude Edwards (m. 1897)
- Occupation: Lawyer

Malcolm Bruce Jackson (August 7, 1873 – April 29, 1947) was a lawyer and political figure in British Columbia. He represented The Islands from 1916 to 1924 in the Legislative Assembly of British Columbia as a Liberal.

He was born in Woodville, Ontario in 1873, of Scottish descent, and came to Winnipeg with his family in 1880. He was educated in Winnipeg and at the University of Manitoba. Jackson received a law degree in 1908. He ran unsuccessfully for a seat in the Manitoba assembly in 1907 and in the Marquette federal riding in 1908. In 1909, he moved to Victoria and was admitted to the British Columbia bar. He was defeated in the 1912 provincial election when he ran as a Liberal in the Esquimalt riding. After serving two terms in the Legislature, Jackson was defeated when he ran for reelection to the provincial assembly in 1924 and again in 1928. Later in 1924, Jackson was named special counsel in the Janet Smith case. He served as chairman of the Game Conservation Board for British Columbia. Jackson died in Victoria in 1947.

His son Hugh Arthur Bruce Jackson died in France at the age of 19 during World War I.
