= British Columbia Maritime Employers' Association =

BCMEA logo

The British Columbia Maritime Employers Association is an association representing the interests of member companies in industrial relations on Vancouver's and other British Columbian seaports.

The BCMEA currently consists of sixty-seven member companies with commercial interests based on the waterfronts of Vancouver and other seaports in British Columbia. The BCMEA is the Employer Association of companies that employ longshoremen, who in turn are represented by the International Longshore and Warehouse Union to bargain with the BCMEA on their behalf. In addition to collective bargaining, the BCMEA handles everyday labour matters, such as administering the collective agreement, payroll services, discipline, and grievance and arbitration hearings on behalf of its members.

Formed after World War I to handle the rapidly growing commercial traffic on the waterfront, it was originally called the Shipping Federation of British Columbia, comprising shipping, railway and container companies, as well as terminal and storage operators.

== History ==
The Shipping Federation was established during what Canadian historians have called the Canadian Labour Revolt in the period following World War I, which peaked in Canada with the Winnipeg General Strike in 1919. the Employers felt they needed to band together, not only because port operations were becoming increasingly complex, but as a bulwark against unionism generally, and union militancy in particular. Vancouver hosted the first Canadian General Strike in Canada in 1918 following the police killing of union leader, Ginger Goodwin. The following year a longer and more extensive general strike was called by the Trades and Labour Council in sympathy with the strike in Winnipeg. Longshoremen were among the first to walk out, but were quickly replaced by strikebreakers who were mainly university and high school students.

By the time the next strike erupted on Vancouver's waterfront, the Shipping Federation had adopted an even more rigidly anti-union policy, influenced by its recent association with counterparts in the United States, who were following what had been dubbed the American Plan. It then set out to break the union completely and establish a company union. Again, it recruited strikebreakers both as replacement workers and as special constables. The CPR's ocean liner, the Empress of Japan, was used to house strikebreakers for the duration of the strike. The strike was quickly brought to an end after the Federation took over the duties of despatching work gangs from the union and refused to negotiate with the union, the International Longshoremen's Association. It established the Vancouver and District Waterfront Workers' Association to replace the ILA as a company union.

Almost a decade of peace followed the 1923 strike. It was not a lasting peace however, and in 1933 the Shipping Federation discovered that not only had the union been transformed by Communist Party organizers into a militant union, but also that agitators were planning a general strike for the province to begin on Vancouver's waterfront in 1935.

Communists were active both on the waterfront and in the government relief camps for the unemployed, as well as several other industries, organizing workers into unions affiliated with the Communist trade union umbrella, the Workers' Unity League. During this era, the Comintern, or Communist International in Moscow was prescribing a policy of dual unionism. The Shipping Federation was thus centrally positioned during what was effectively another Red Scare in 1935.

The general strike never happened in 1935, and striking relief camp workers left the city shortly after the waterfront strike finally was called for the On-to-Ottawa Trek. Technically it was a lock-out. The union voted to take back control of despatching work gangs because discrimination, blacklisting, and the arbitrary allocation of work had long been a major grievance for longshoremen. According to the most recent contract however, the Federation was to handle dispatching, and therefore treated the union's action as a breach of contract.

The 1935 strike had seeped into the political realm much more extensively than the 1923 strike had. The civic administration of Mayor Gerry McGeer, along with his chief constable, Colonel Foster had joined with the Shipping Federation to defeat the Communist threat. The Communists had been planning to merge the waterfront and relief camp strike, and hopefully other industrial workers into a general strike. Although these various groups of workers were willingly under Communist leadership, they primarily were pursuing resolution to their own workplace grievances, not a proletarian revolution.

The strike peaked with the July 18, 1935 Battle of Ballantyne Pier, where the police clashed with strikers and their supporters who had attempted to march down to the harbour. Three levels of police were on hand, plus a plethora of special constables, organized in part by the Shipping Federation's Citizens' League of British Columbia, a vigilante group it funded to fight the strike and generate anti-strike/anticommunist propaganda. Again, the strike was broken, and the union replaced with a company union.

The Communists shifted away from the dual unionism strategy and dissolved the Workers' Union League. Agitators now put their organizing energy behind the CIO industrial union movement. The Shipping Federation stepped back from it overt anticommunism, but continued to fund a variation of the Citizens' League, the Industrial Association of British Columbia under the leadership of Colonel C. E. Edgett, former police chief, prison warden, and leading local anticommunist polemicist. Nevertheless, workers managed to establish and sustain an independent union under Harry Bridges's new International Longshore and Warehouse Union (ILWU) that still exists today.

== Member Companies ==
- Anglo Canadian Shipping Company
- APL Canada
- Associated Stevedoring Co. Ltd.
- Barwil Agencies (N.A.) Inc
- Cerescorp Company
- CP Ships (Canada) Agencies Limited.
- China Ocean Shipping Co. (Canada) Inc.
- China Shipping (Canada) Agency Co. Ltd.
- Coastal Containers Ltd.
- Colley West Shipping Ltd.
- Compass Marine Services Inc.
- Dubai Ports World (Canada)
- Dominion Shipping Co. Ltd.
- Empire Grain Stevedoring Ltd.
- Empire Shipping Company Limited
- Evergreen America Corporation
- Fairmont Shipping (Canada) Limited
- Fesco Agencies N.A. Inc.
- Fibreco Export Inc.
- Fraser Surrey Docks LP
- Gearbulk Shipping Canada Ltd.
- GCT Global Container Terminals Inc.
- Greer Shipping Ltd.
- Hanjin Shipping Company Limited
- Hapag-Lloyd (Canada) Inc.
- Hyundai America Shipping Agency (P.N.), Inc.
- International Chartering Services Ltd.
- Interocean Steamship Corporation
- Island Shipping Limited
- Kerr Norton Marine Canada
- Louis Wolfe & Sons (Vancouver) Ltd.
- Maher Terminals of Canada Corp.
- McLean Kennedy Inc.
- Maersk Canada Inc.
- Maple Shipping
- Mason Agency Ltd.
- Montship Inc.
- N Y K Line (Western Canada) Inc.
- Neptune Bulk Terminals (Canada) Ltd.
- Norasia Container Lines Canada Ltd.
- Norsk Pacific Steamship Canada Limited
- North Pacific Shipping Company Ltd.
- Norton Lilly International
- Oldendorff Carriers
- OOCL (Canada) Inc.
- P & O Nedlloyd Limited
- Pacific Coast Terminals Co. Ltd.
- Pacific Northwest Ship & Cargo Services Inc.
- Pacific Rim Stevedoring Ltd.
- Pacific Stevedoring & Contracting Co. Ltd.
- PacNord Agencies Ltd.
- PCDC Canada Ltd.
- Saga Forest Carriers International (Canada) Ltd.
- Sanko Kisen (Canada) Ltd.
- Seaboard International Shipping Company Limited
- Seabridge International Shipping Inc.
- Sinotrans Canada Inc.
- SMI Marine Limited
- Squamish Terminals Ltd.
- Star Shipping (Canada) Ltd.
- Terminal Dock Limited
- TFL Forest Limited - Stuart Channel Wharves Division
- Trans-Oceanic Shipping Co. Ltd.
- Vancouver Shipping Agencies Ltd.
- Vancouver Wharves Ltd.
- Westcan Stevedoring Ltd.
- Westcan Terminals Ltd.
- Western Stevedoring Company Limited
- Western Stevedoring Terminal Operations Ltd.
- Westward Shipping Ltd.
- Weyerhaeuser Canada Ltd.
- Zim Integrated Shipping Services (Canada) Ltd.
