= Adam Palmer =

Adam Palmer COM

31st Chief Constable of Vancouver
- In office May 6, 2015 – April 2025
- Preceded by: Jim Chu
- Succeeded by: Steve Rai

Personal details
- Occupation: Police officer

Adam Palmer, COM is an assistant commissioner of the Royal Canadian Mounted Police. He previously served as the chief constable of Vancouver, British Columbia from May 6, 2015 to April 2025, when he resigned to become assistant commissioner of the RCMP.

Police appointments
Preceded by Jim Chu	Chief Constable of Vancouver; 2015–2025	Succeeded by Steve Rai
