= Jamie Graham =

Jamie H. Graham O.O.M.

12th Chief Constable of the Victoria Police Department
- In office January 1, 2009 – December 31, 2013
- Preceded by: Bill Naughton

Chief Constable of Vancouver
- In office August 22, 2002 – August 14, 2007
- Preceded by: Terry Blythe
- Succeeded by: Jim Chu

Personal details
- Born: Belleville, Ontario
- Spouse: Gail Graham
- Occupation: Police

Jamie Graham, O.O.M. is a former chief for the Victoria Police Department. He previously served as the chief constable of Vancouver, British Columbia from August 22, 2002 to August 13, 2007. A former Royal Canadian Mounted Police officer, Graham's five-year contract with the Vancouver Police Department was not renewed. His time as chief there ended on August 22, 2007.

He is a supporter of numerous charities including the Law Enforcement Torch Run, Canadian Cancer Society, Cancer Foundation, Cops for Cancer, Canadian Blood Services, Owl Society, Covenant House and Salvation Army to name a few. He is also a member of the British Columbia Veterinary Medical Association’s Lay Inquiry Pool.

== Personal life ==
Graham was born in Belleville, Ontario. The son of a Canadian Army colonel, he lived in Halifax, New Delhi, and Quantico, Virginia. He attended King’s College, a boarding school in Nova Scotia.

He and his wife, lawyer Gail Graham, have been married 27 years and have no children.

== Policing career ==
Graham was a 34-year veteran of the RCMP when he was hired as Vancouver’s chief constable. He was chosen for the job over a field of competitors for that included Larry Campbell, who became Graham’s boss as Vancouver’s mayor, and eventually a Canadian senator. Graham was chief superintendent of the Surrey RCMP detachment from 2000 to 2002, and before that commanded the North Vancouver detachment from 1992 to 2000.

Graham was popular with his officers while chief of the Vancouver Police Department, and improved morale during his tenure. Former Vancouver mayor Philip Owen noted "He's a cop throughout, and that's what the members of the department like. They like a strong leader." Many officers describe him as the best chief in the history of the department.

In his role as chief constable, Graham was an active member of a number of policing and community organizations. He was a member of the by-law committee of the Major Cities Chiefs Association (MCCA), and sat on the executive committee of the Criminal Intelligence Service Canada and the board of governance of the Combined Forces Special Investigation Unit. He took on a leadership role in the "Tier 1 Strategy" against outlaw motorcycle gangs. A former president of the British Columbia Association of Chiefs of Police (BCACP), Graham chaired its gaming and mental health committees, and represented the BCACP on the board of the Integrated Illegal Gambling Enforcement Team. He was also a member of the Vancouver Board of Trade. Other organizations he has worked with include the International Association of Chiefs of Police (IACP), the North Vancouver Restorative Justice Society, the Justice Institute of British Columbia, and the Surrey Memorial Hospital Foundation.

Graham established public affairs and marketing sections in the department, the public relations branch for the police force.

== Awards ==
The Governor General, the Right Honourable Michaëlle Jean, appointed Graham a member of the Order of St. John on December 15, 2006. On January 6, 2010, Graham was appointed as an officer of the Order of Merit of the Police Forces (O.O.M.). A ceremony in Ottawa followed on May 26, 2010.

== Controversy and criticism ==
Graham and his department have been the subject of controversy during his term. The Georgia Straight newspaper has criticized Graham for being too entrenched in traditional police culture to effectively respond to problems of misconduct.

In January 2003, three men were beaten by police officers in Stanley Park. Graham recommended that six officers be charged in connection with the assault. He later fired two of them and imposed the maximum suspensions under the Police Act to the other four after they pleaded guilty to the charges.

Pivot Legal Society published To Serve and Protect: A Report on Policing in Vancouver’s Downtown Eastside in 2002, which documented approximately 60 affidavits from people regarding police misconduct. Pivot also filed a number of complaints against the VPD with the Police Complaint Commissioner (PCC), Dirk Ryneveld. After an internal investigation by the Vancouver Police and the RCMP, no criminal allegations were found or substantiated. Two officers received minimal discipline for what was determined to be minor policy violations. In 2005, Ryneveld issued a report stating, "What we do know is that RCMP ultimately reported the very regrettable circumstance of a lack of cooperation on the part of 'certain VPD members,' also incidents of non-responsiveness by the police chief himself." Mayor Sam Sullivan dismissed the non-cooperation complaint in May 2007, stating partly that there was no practical way to discipline a retiring police chief. Ryneveld overruled him, demanding that a further investigation take place. Graham strongly denied obstructing the RCMP in any way, referring people to his published report on the matter. The new investigation was conducted by Jim Cessford of the Delta Police Department. In his report, Cessford wrote that "Chief Graham did not fully exercise his authority in ensuring that his members cooperated [with the RCMP] as required." Although Graham did not actively obstruct the RCMP investigation, Cessford concluded that he did commit, "through his inaction, the Code of Conduct offence of Discreditable Conduct." The Office of the Police Complaint Commissioner reviewed and accepted the report's finding of discreditable conduct, but did not see anything to warrant a public inquiry into the matter.

During the 2005 municipal elections, Graham had Sam Sullivan, then a candidate for mayor, investigated for his admission that he had given money to addicts to buy drugs and allowed one to smoke crack in his van. An editorial in the Georgia Straight attacked the investigation as a political move.

Graham and the Vancouver Police Department have expressed support for the principles behind Insite, Vancouver's controversial safe injection site, which has drawn criticism from conservative groups and the RCMP. Noting that "our organization's [the VPD] primary responsibilities are safety and public order", Graham has supported any project that falls within the laws of Canada.

In April 2006, RCMP investigators exonerated Graham from allegations of misappropriating funds related to a 2004 police conference. An employee had alleged that Graham and other police executives used complimentary hotels rooms during the convention.

In July 2006, Graham left a bullet-riddled shooting range target on the desk of city manager Judy Rogers. On the target, Graham wrote: "A bad day at the range is better than the best day at work." He later apologized to her for the incident.

In January 2012, the Honourable Jakob S. de Villiers rendered final judgement of misconduct against Graham for comments made to media surrounding protest events during the 2010 Olympics. This was Graham's second conviction under the police act

In February 2012, Graham admitted guilt for "neglect of duty" under the police act, for unsafe storage of a loaded handgun under the seat of his car and received a reprimand for his misconduct.

Police appointments
Preceded by Bill Naughton	Chief Constable of Victoria Police Department; 2009-2013	Succeeded by N/A
Police appointments
Preceded by Terry Blythe	Chief Constable of Vancouver; 2002 – 2007	Succeeded by Jim Chu
