= Roy Jokanovich =

Canadian football player (1934–2007)

Profile
- Positions: Offensive tackle, Guard

Personal information
- Born: October 27, 1934; Alberta, Canada
- Died: August 6, 2007 (aged 72); Vancouver, Canada
- Listed height: 6 ft 1 in (1.85 m)
- Listed weight: 235 lb (107 kg)

Career information
- College: University of British Columbia

Career history
- 1960–1961: Toronto Argonauts
- 1962–1964: Calgary Stampeders

Radomir "Roy" Jokanovich (October 27, 1934 – August 6, 2007) was an offensive tackle and offensive guard in the Canadian Football League for the Toronto Argonauts and Calgary Stampeders from 1960 to 1964.

== Biography ==
He was born as Radomir Jokanovich on October 27, 1934, to Serb father Miloš and Slovene mother Christine "Katerina" Jokanovich (née Matjašec).

After playing college football at the University of British Columbia, Roy Jokanovich joined the Toronto Argonauts in 1960. Jokanovich was traded to the Calgary Stampeders in 1962 and stayed with them until 1964. During that 3-year stretch, the Stampeders led the league in scoring in 1964 and 1963 and was second in 1962. A durable player, he never participated in fewer than 13 games in any year.

Jokanovich attended the Saint Michael the Archangel Serbian Orthodox Church in Vancouver.

Jokanovich died on August 6, 2007, in Vancouver. He is interred at Forest Lawn Memorial Park in Burnaby.
