= Jim Chu =

Canadian police chief

Jim Chu C.O.M.
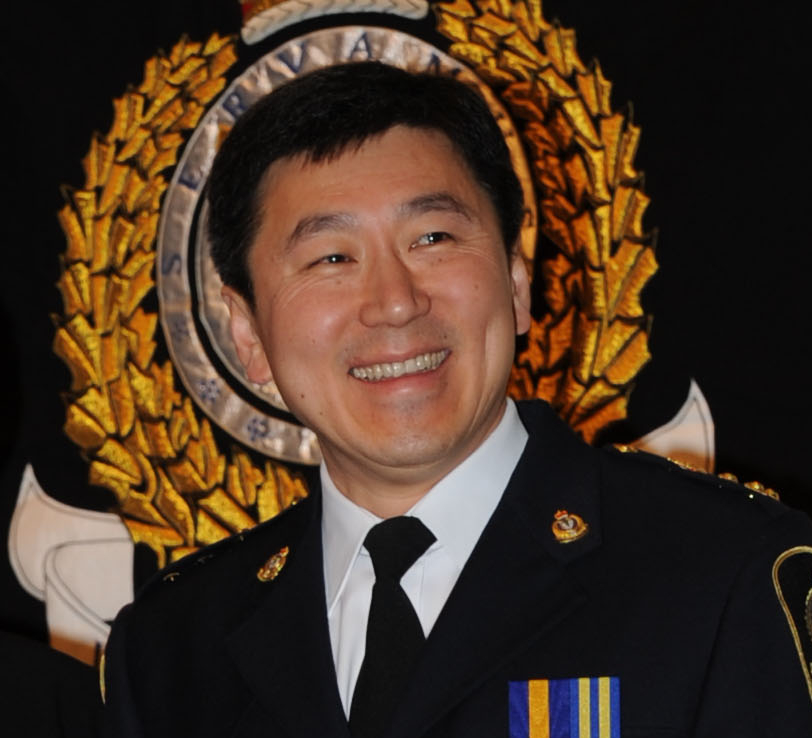

Chief Constable of Vancouver
- In office August 14, 2007 – May 6, 2015
- Preceded by: Jamie Graham
- Succeeded by: Adam Palmer

Personal details
- Born: 1959 (age 66–67) Shanghai, China
- Spouse: Vicki Chu
- Children: 4
- Education: Simon Fraser University, UBC Sauder School of Business
- Occupation: Police Chief

Jim Chu, COM (simplified Chinese: 朱小荪; traditional Chinese: 朱小蓀; pinyin: Zhū Xiǎosūn) is a former-Chief Constable of the Vancouver Police Department (VPD). On June 21, 2007, Chu was named as the successor of Chief Constable Jamie Graham. On January 23, 2015, it was announced Chu was planning to retire after a 36-year career with Vancouver Police and he did officially do so on May 6, 2015, upon the swearing-in of his successor, Adam Palmer.

== Biography ==
Chu grew up in East Vancouver, the second oldest of four children of immigrants from Shanghai. Chu often faced the Riley Park gang when growing up. He stated:

The Riley Park gang was a product of the housing project by Ontario and 33rd Avenue. They were lower-income, often single-parent families living there. I didn't think of them that way at the time-they were just kids I went to school with. They wore jean jackets and jeans. Other kids wouldn't wear that-that signified you were a Riley Parker. They were tough guys who fought with tire irons and chains, and if you fought one of them, you had to fight all of them".

In 1973 as a 14-year-old paperboy, he was confronted by the Riley Park gang as he recalled:

"Our shack at 26th and Main won recognition for the fewest complaints in the city. Our supervisor said, 'you guys did great, I'm going to buy you some burgers and pop'. The day came, and he brought the burgers to the shack. And just as soon as he dumped them on the table, the Riley Park guys came over and said, 'These look good and we're gonna help ourselves' and ate them all. The supervisor didn't do a thing. He was too scared to get involved. To look back it's sort of funny now. Whenever I se the character of Nelson Muntz on The Simpsons, I think of the kids who became Riley Parkers".

Chu stated that his experiences with the Riley Park gang led to his interest in becoming a policeman. Chu graduated from Sir Charles Tupper Secondary School, where he played rugby, in 1978. A fellow alumni of Sir Charles Tupper was the gangster Bindy Johal, a man whom Chu was to pursue as a policeman. Joining the police department a year after his high school graduation, he continued his education at the same time, earning a Bachelor of Business Administration from Simon Fraser University and an MBA from the UBC Sauder School of Business. His police training includes the FBI Advanced SWAT course and the FBI National Executive Institute.

Chu has served in a number of investigative and support roles. As sergeant in charge of recruiting, he developed the VPD's applicant guide and the department's first website in 1996. In 1997, he became an inspector, and since then has supervised a number of transitions in the VPD's electronic communications technology, including the introduction of its current radio system and mobile computing system. In 2001, he was given command of District 4, which roughly corresponds to the Southwest quarter of Vancouver.

Chu became a deputy chief in 2003, in charge of the Support Services division, which handles human resources, information technology, planning and communications. It also includes the department's Financial Services Section, and he has earned recognition for his role in dealing with the department's cost overruns. In July 2007, he was placed in charge of the Operations Support division, which oversees criminal intelligence, emergency response and the gang and drug squads. He is the author of a 2001 book, Law Enforcement Information Technology.

In May 2007, the Governor General of Canada awarded Chu the Order of Merit of Police Forces for service beyond the call of duty. In 2015, he was promoted to the rank of Commander of the Order of Merit. In 1999 he received the Super Trustee award from the British Columbia Library Trustees Association. In 2010, he was named one of 25 Transformation Canadians by The Globe and Mail/La Presse, and received an Outstanding Alumni Award from Simon Fraser University. In May 2015, he became the first municipal police senior officer in B.C. to be granted a Commission. On June 21, 2007, Chu was named as the successor of Chief Constable Jamie Graham, who was set to retire in August. Chu assumed command of the department on August 14, the day after the police fatally shot Paul Boyd on Granville Street.

Chu served as Chief Constable during the 2010 Winter Olympics and as riots erupted in downtown Vancouver at the conclusion of game seven of the 2011 Stanley Cup finals. During his time as Chief Constable, Chu found himself defending the Vancouver police department against charges of racism and misogyny as social activists accused the police department of being indifferent to the rapes and murders of the impoverished, often First Nations, women of the Downtown Eastside. On 30 July 2010, the Supreme Court of Canada lifted the publication ban imposed in 2002 relating to the prosecution of the serial killer Robert Picton who killed 49 women. The lifting of the publication ban revealed that a woman was stabbed by Picton on his farm in 1997, but managed to escape. The police dismissed her allegations of attempted murder as the ravings of a drug addict from the Downtown Eastside. Likewise, another woman who escaped from Picton's farm in 1999 stated to the police that he had a freezer full of human flesh in his farmhouse, which was likewise dismissed as the ravings of another drug addict from the Downtown Eastside. Through the investigation of Picton's killings took place prior to Chu becoming police chief in 2007, he found himself facing a firestorm of criticism when the publication ban was lifted in 2010. The journalist Jerry Langton wrote that many people in the Lower Mainland were "appalled" by the casual indifference shown by the police to the disappearance of women from the Downtown Eastside along with the way that police had denied in the 1990s that there was even a serial killer at large in the Lower Mainland. The fact that Picton was white while many of his victims were First Nations women led many to accuse the Vancouver police of racism and sexism.

On 15 September 2010, Ashley Mackiskinic, a First Nations woman and a drug addict was found dead after falling to her death from the fifth floor of the Regent Hotel on the Downtown Eastside. A number of social activists stated that Mackinskinic was murdered. The majority of the drugs of the Downtown Eastside are sold by drug dealers working for the Hells Angels who are known to use brutal methods to punish drug addicts who fall into arrears such as rape, beatings, dismemberment and murder. The police stated that there was no conclusive evidence that Mackiskinic was pushed to her death, and noted that the corner's report revealed that Mackinskinic had an "elevated level" of alcohol in her blood at the time of her death along a "potentially lethal" amount of cocaine. The Mackiskinic affair became a cause célèbre with a number of social activists who insisted that Mackiskinic had been killed by the Hells Angels and that the Vancouver police were not pursuing the investigation of her death with sufficient vigor.

On 6 October 2010, Chu took part in a "townhall meeting" to discuss Mackiskinic's death where he and the police department were accused of indifference to the frequent murders of the female drug addicts and/or prostitutes of the Downtown Eastside. In response, Chu stated: "The Vancouver police department has a commitment to provide safety for all. The police department is greatly enhanced if you help us". A number of women at the "townhall meeting" stated that Mackinskinic was murdered. Gladys Radek of the Walk 4 Justice group stated: "There's been a few women lately thrown out of windows. Women missing fingers, wearing wigs because their heads have been shaved". Angela Marie MacDougall, the director of the Battered Women's Support Services, stated at the meeting that Mackinskinc was murdered, saying: "The rapes and beatings are standard punishment. What is a little bit unusual are women's heads being shaven and women coming out of windows". Chu stated in the absence of suspects and evidence that Mackinskinic had been murdered, it was impossible for the police to lay charges, and that if anyone had any information proving that Mackiskinic was murdered that they should contact the police immediately. It remains unclear if Mackiskinic was thrown out of the window to her death or fell to her death because of her drug-addled state.

He was elected for a two-year term as President of the Canadian Association of Chiefs of Police in 2013 and advocated for a ticketing option for possession of small amount of marijuana and better training for police officers to serve the mentally ill.

As he wound down his 36-year policing career, with almost eight years as Chief Constable, he was especially proud of the falling crime in the city, improved relations with marginalized people in the Downtown Eastside and with Vancouver's First Nations community, and the VPD's work in advocating for the mentally ill. On May 25, 2015, he became the first municipal police officer in BC to receive the Police Officer Commission – a new provincial honour that recognizes for senior officers of their rank, professionalism and dedication to policing in B.C.

In July 2015, Chu joined the Aquilini Investment Group as a Vice President.

He served on the Board of TransLink.

In July 2021 Chu was appointed as Board Chair of the BC Emergency Health Services by BC Minister of Health, Adrian Dix.

On August 18, 2023, Jim Chu was appointed by the Prime Minister as a member of the National Security Intelligence Review Agency. NSIRA appointments are made by the Governor in Council on the advice of the Prime Minister, and in consultation with the leaders of the opposition parties.

== Books ==
- Langton, Jerry (2013). The Notorious Bacon Brothers : inside gang warfare on Vancouver streets. Etobicoke, Ont.: J. Wiley and Sons Canada. ISBN 978-1118388679.

Police appointments
Preceded by Jamie Graham	Chief Constable of Vancouver; 2007–2015	Succeeded by Adam Palmer
