= Thomas Wilson Paterson =

Canadian politician (1850–1921)

The Honourable Thomas Wilson Paterson
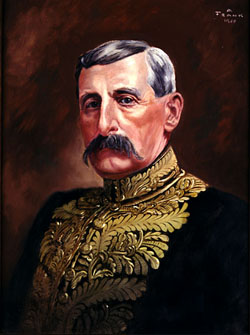

9th Lieutenant Governor of British Columbia
- In office December 3, 1909 – December 5, 1914
- Monarchs: Edward VII; George V
- Governors General: The Earl Grey the Duke of Connaught and Strathearn
- Premier: Richard McBride
- Preceded by: James Dunsmuir
- Succeeded by: Francis Stillman Barnard

MLA for North Victoria
- In office December 23, 1902 – October 3, 1903
- Preceded by: John Paton Booth
- Succeeded by: district abolished

MLA for The Islands
- In office October 3, 1903 – February 2, 1907
- Preceded by: new member
- Succeeded by: Albert Edward McPhillips

Personal details
- Born: 6 December 1850 Darvel, Ayr, Scotland
- Died: 28 August 1921 (aged 70) Victoria, British Columbia
- Party: Liberal
- Spouse: Emma Elizabeth Riley (m. 1886)
- Occupation: Railway contractor
- Profession: Politician

Thomas Wilson Paterson (6 December 1850 – 28 August 1921) was a Canadian railway contractor, politician, and the ninth Lieutenant Governor of British Columbia.

== Railway career ==
After moving to British Columbia in 1885, he helped to build the Esquimalt & Nanaimo Railway line on Vancouver Island. In 1895, he became general manager of the Victoria and Sidney Railway. In 1897, Paterson filed for and was granted a patent for a spark catcher and smoke burner for locomotives. The following year, he filed for a patent in the United States as well.

== Political career ==
In 1902, Paterson ran as an independent candidate in a byelection for the provincial riding of North Victoria prompted by the death of the incumbent, John Paton Booth. He defeated a government-aligned candidate by 43 votes (12% of the votes cast). For the 1903 election, the North Victoria riding was abolished during redistribution, and Thomas ran as a Liberal candidate in the newly created riding of The Islands. He defeated a Conservative candidate by 67 votes (19% of the votes cast). In the 1907 election, a new Conservative candidate won by 6 votes (2% of votes cast), and Thomas was unseated.

In 1907, he was defeated when running for mayor of Victoria.

From 1909 to 1914, he was the Lieutenant Governor of British Columbia. In 1912, he presented a cup to the Pacific Coast Hockey Association. The cup was first won by the New Westminster Royals, who were PCHA champions in the PCHA's first season.

== Family and personal life ==
Born in Darvel, Scotland, he immigrated to Canada with his parents. He was raised in Ontario.

Paterson married Emma Elizabeth Riley, the daughter of George Riley in Victoria on November 25, 1886. Paterson retired in 1914. He died in Victoria on August 28, 1921, and was buried in Ross Bay Cemetery.
