= MacGregor MacIntosh =

Canadian politician (1896–1955)

Macgregor Macintosh
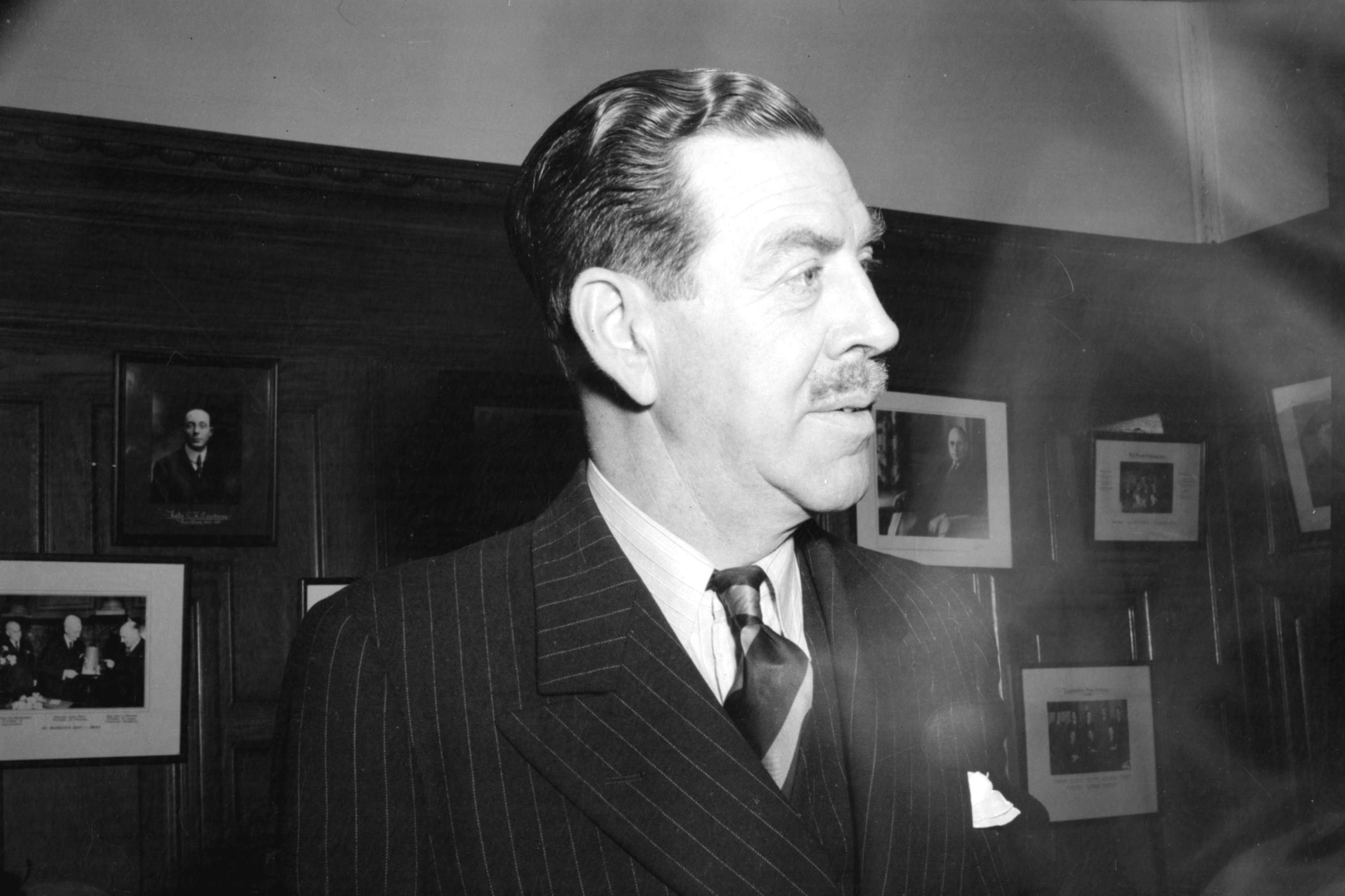
- MacIntosh in 1943

Member of the Legislative Assembly of British Columbia
- In office 1937–1941
- Preceded by: Alexander McDonald
- Succeeded by: none
- Constituency: The Islands
- In office 1931–1933
- Preceded by: Cyrus Wesley Peck
- Succeeded by: Alexander McDonald

Personal details
- Born: August 25, 1896 Glasgow, Scotland
- Died: August 3, 1955 (aged 58) mountainside near Kemano, British Columbia
- Party: Conservative
- Spouse: Margaret Sydney McBride
- Children: 4
- Occupation: Merchant, Captain in the Canadian Militia

Macgregor Fullarton MacIntosh (August 25, 1896 – August 3, 1955) was a Canadian politician. He served in the Legislative Assembly of British Columbia from 1931 to 1933 and from 1937 to 1941, as a Conservative member for the constituency of The Islands. He was an unsuccessful candidate in the 1941 and 1945 provincial elections.

== Electoral history ==
19th British Columbia election, 1937
Party	Candidate	Votes	%	±	Expenditures
Social Credit	Gordon Hay Brown	51	2.41%		unknown
Conservative	Macgregor Fullarton MacIntosh	953	45.12%		unknown
Co-operative Commonwealth Fed.	Grace E. Burtt Martin	414	19.60%		unknown
Liberal	Alexander McDonald	694	32.86%		unknown
Total valid votes		2,112	100.00%		
Total rejected ballots		21			
Turnout		%			

He fought in WW1 and WW2. In 1941, the area was redistributed into the new Nanaimo and the Islands riding. Parts of it are now in Saanich North and the Islands. Macgregor Fullarton MacIntosh died in a plane crash in summer 1955.
