= Forest Lawn Memorial Park (Burnaby) =

Cemetery in Burnaby, British Columbia

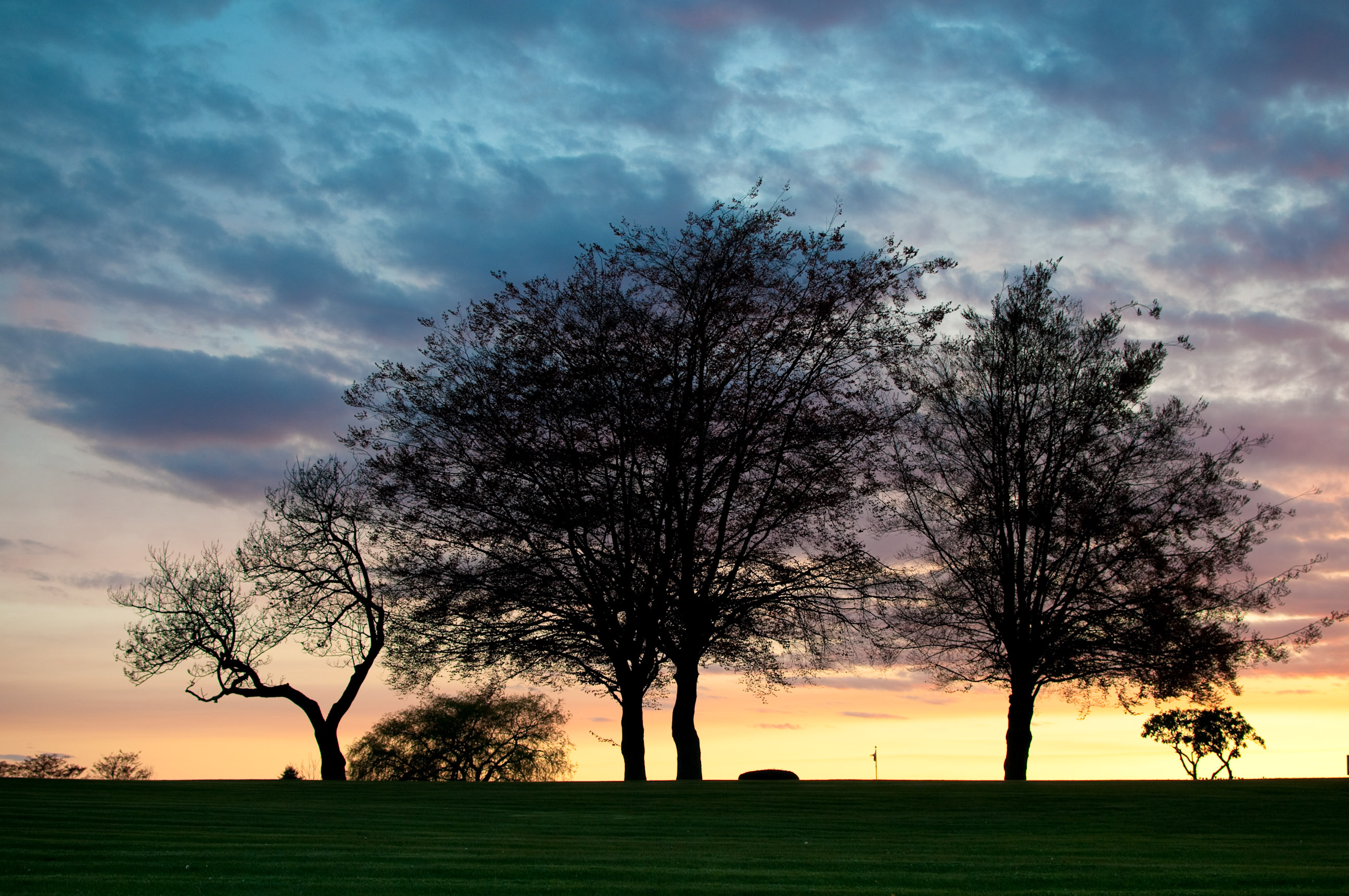
- Interactive map of Forest Lawn Memorial Park

Details
- Established: 1935
- Location: Burnaby, British Columbia
- Country: Canada
- Coordinates: 49°14′50″N 122°59′31″W
- Owned by: Dignity Memorial
- No. of graves: >20,000
- Website: Official website
- Find a Grave: Forest Lawn Memorial Park

Forest Lawn Memorial Park is a cemetery in Burnaby, British Columbia in Canada. The burial park was founded in 1936 and the funeral home was established in 1965. The cemetery contains the war graves of 37 Commonwealth service personnel of World War II.

== Notable interments ==
- William Aberhart, Premier of Alberta from 1935 to 1943
- Charles Edwards, journalist and news agency executive
- Doug Grimston, president of the Canadian Amateur Hockey Association
- Frederick Hume, politician
- Roy Jokanovich, CFL player
- Li Shiu Tong, gender studies pioneer
- Amby Moran, hockey player
- Michael James O'Rourke, Irish-born Canadian Victoria Cross recipient.
- Claude C. Robinson, ice hockey executive and inductee of the Hockey Hall of Fame
- Captain Samuel Robinson, British-born Canadian sea captain with the Canadian Pacific Line from 1895 to 1932
- Lydia Shum, Hong Kong actress who died in 2008. Shum's parents are also buried close to her grave site.
- Ronald Tabak, rock singer
- Charles William Train, British Victoria Cross recipient
