= Janet Smith case =

1924 murder case

Coordinates: 49.232762°N 123.096753°W

Janet Smith
- Born: 25 June 1902; Perth, Scotland
- Died: 26 July 1924 (aged 22); Vancouver, Canada
- Cause of death: Ballistic trauma
- Occupation: Nursemaid
- Known for: Victim of an unsolved murder
- Parent(s): Arthur Mitchell Tooner Smith; Joanna Benzies

The Janet Smith case concerns the murder of 22-year-old nursemaid Janet Kennedy Smith in Vancouver, British Columbia, Canada, on 26 July 1924, and the ensuing suspicions of a coverup.

== Background ==
Janet Smith was born in Perth, Scotland, on 25 June 1902 to railway fireman Arthur Mitchell Tooner Smith and Joanna Benzies. The family moved to London when she was aged 11. In January 1923, Smith obtained a position taking care of the newborn daughter of Frederick and Doreen Baker. Frederick Baker ran an import-export business. When the family moved, first to Paris in April, then in October back to Vancouver, Smith accompanied them.

The Bakers were among the social elite of Vancouver. They lived on the fashionable West Side. In May 1924, they moved into the house of Frederick's brother, Richard Plunkett Baker, at 3851 Osler, in the exclusive Shaughnessy Heights neighborhood.

A Chinese houseboy, Wong Foon Sing, between 25 and 27 years of age (who had arrived in Canada in 1913, leaving his family in Hong Kong), soon became infatuated with Smith and gave her presents, such as a silk nightdress. Smith's friends later testified she had feared him.

== Death and lack of an investigation ==
On 26 July 1924, Point Grey Police Constable James Green was called to the house. Wong claimed he had heard a sound that resembled a car backfiring, and then found Smith's body in the basement. The police inspected Smith's body and found a bullet wound in her temple. A .45 caliber revolver lay near her right hand.

Green picked up the weapon, which later made it impossible to obtain reliable fingerprints from it. Despite there being no bullet, blood, or brain tissue on the walls, nor powder burns on Smith's face, and it was clear that the back of Smith's head had been smashed in, Green nevertheless concluded that Smith had committed suicide. After an inquest, the Vancouver coroner called it a "self-inflicted, but accidental death."

An undertaker was summoned, and instructed by both the coroner and the police to embalm the body. This process eradicated the possibility to obtain further evidence, for instance whether Smith had been sexually assaulted. This was the first time this undertaker had embalmed a victim of a violent death without having conducted a postmortem, however, he did make a note of unexplained burns on Smith's right side. Smith was buried at the Mountain View Cemetery.

== Reopening of the case ==
Smith's friends contacted the recently formed United Council of Scottish Societies, which pressured the provincial government and Attorney General Alexander Malcolm Manson to reopen the case. The Vancouver Star, a scandal sheet published by Victor Odlum, was quick to pounce on the affair. An additional inducement for Odlum was that an enemy of his, General A. D. McRae, was the father of Frederick Baker's sister-in-law.

The body was exhumed on 28 August 1924 and a second inquest held. This time, the jury concluded that Smith had been murdered. Manson appointed a special prosecutor, Malcolm Bruce Jackson.

Suspicion immediately fell on Wong, the only other person in the house (other than the Bakers' baby, Rosemary) at the time when the crime had supposedly been committed. The Star published several articles in late July and early August in which it portrayed Wong as the likely killer.

== Proposed legislation ==
Odlum was an exclusionist and believed that Asians could not assimilate with Caucasians. He had run on an anti-Asian platform in the 1921 federal election. On 8 August 1924, he published an editorial called "Should Chinese Work with White Girls?" He called for legislation to "preserve white girls of impressionable youth from the unnecessary wiles and villainies of low caste yellow men."

Popular Member of the Legislative Assembly Mary Ellen Smith introduced the "Janet Smith Bill" in November 1924. It would have prohibited employment of Asians and white women in the same household. The Vancouver Province pointed out such a rule would violate the Anglo-Japanese Treaty of 1911 (which prohibited discriminatory legislation against the Japanese) and that the British Columbia legislature did not have the authority to pass it. It failed after the second reading.

== Kidnapping ==
In late 1924, Wong Foon Sing was kidnapped by Oscar B.V. Norton, the manager of the Canadian Detective Bureau, and V.W. Norton, with the support of the police. The two men attempted to beat a confession out of him, but let him go the following day when he maintained his innocence. Interest gradually died down until six months later, on 20 March 1925, Wong was kidnapped by a group of men dressed in Ku Klux Klan robes. They proceeded to torture their captive for six weeks, trying to elicit a confession, but Wong refused to cooperate. He was finally released on 1 May 1925. Norton later confessed that the police and the Provincial Government in Victoria had full knowledge of the abduction, were paying for it, and had promised immunity to the kidnappers.

A scandal developed, as it became known "two Point Grey police commissioners, the chief of police, a detective sergeant, and three prominent officials of the city's Scottish societies" were among the kidnappers. The kidnapping was allegedly arranged by James Alexander Paton, the mayor of Point Grey and the chairman of its police commission. The group had also enlisted the translation services of Wong Foon Sien (no relation to the accused Wong Foon Sing), whose participation elicited outrage amongst both Chinese Canadians and Anglophones in the community because he had already been working for a detective agency investigating the case at the same time. V.W. Norton pleaded guilty to kidnapping and was sentenced to nine months in prison. Oscar B.V. Robinson and his son, William Robinson, were also convicted after only 35 minutes of deliberation, but the jury gave a "strong recommendation of mercy" for both. Oscar Robinson was sentenced to one year in prison, while William was released into the custody of his mother. The Point Grey policemen were acquitted, and the government controversially barred prosecution of the remaining defendants.

As it turned out, Manson knew where Wong was being held, but did nothing about it, hoping that the torture would successfully solve the case. Instead, Manson's career was severely damaged by the revelation of his inaction.

== Trial ==
In September 1925, Wong's tribulations continued, as he was put on trial for Smith's murder. In October, the case was thrown out of court due to lack of evidence and Wong continued to work for the Bakers. In 1926, he left the country and returned to his native Hong Kong.

== Other suspects ==
Among several other theories which gained popularity at the time was a rumor that Smith had been raped and murdered during a wild party at the Baker house by wealthy playboys, who then bribed the authorities to cover it all up.

== Bibliography ==
- Starkins, Ed (1984). Who Killed Janet Smith? Gage Distribution Co. ISBN 0-7715-9813-0

== See also ==
- List of unsolved murders (1900–1979)
