= Charles Edgar Edgett =

Canadian police chief (1881–1947)

Colonel Charles Edgar Edgett (25 September 1881 - 9 January 1947) was the warden of the British Columbia Penitentiary (1929–1931), the Chief Constable of the Vancouver Police Department (1931–1933), an active anti-communist and opponent of organized labour in Vancouver, British Columbia, Canada.

Colonel Edgett was born in Moncton, New Brunswick, and briefly served in the North-West Mounted Police before receiving training as a veterinarian (giving him the nickname "Doc"). He enlisted in 1914 and served in the First World War as part of the Royal Canadian Army Veterinary Corps, winning a DSO for distinguished service at Vimy Ridge in 1917. He was also Mentioned in Despatches twice.

He lived in the Okanagan Valley as a fruit grower and ran as a candidate in provincial elections before moving to the Lower Mainland. Edgett was lured from his position as warden to become the new police chief in 1931 by a comparatively lucrative salary offer. During his tenure as chief, he oversaw a degree of modernization of the police force, including the introduction of radio-equipped patrol cars.

In February 1933, Edgett was fired by Mayor L. D. Taylor for inefficiency. Edgett unsuccessfully challenged this move in court before becoming the spokesman for the Shipping Federation of British Columbia's new "Citizens League" in 1935. The Citizens' League was established as a propaganda vehicle to combat Communist organizing that was leading a movement of militancy in BC, particularly amongst the unemployed and longshoremen. Edgett soon established himself as one of the pre-eminent anticommunist polemicist in Vancouver. Although he did not explicitly identify himself as a fascist, he made it clear in his fierce opposition to Communism that the extreme of fascism was preferable to the extreme of Communism. He viewed the latter as an international Jewish conspiracy and despised the internationalism promoted by Communist ideologues. His views were most widely disseminated in a speech he gave that was published in a local newspaper and in the RCMP Gazette in 1936.

The Citizens' League was short-lived, and was dismantled after problems with the Communists dissipated in Vancouver following the On-to-Ottawa Trek. Edgett continued on however in the Shipping Federation's successor anti-labour organization, the Industrial Association. Edgett also served as the president of the Terminal City "gentlemen's club" in the 1940s.
