= Vancouver Police Department =

Municipal police of the Canadian city of Vancouver

- Heraldic badge of the VPD

- Shoulder Flash of the Vancouver Police
- Common name: Vancouver Police
- Abbreviation: VPD

Agency overview
- Formed: May 10, 1886
- Employees: 1,909
- Volunteers: Depending on CPC
- Annual budget: $349.6 m

Jurisdictional structure
- Operations jurisdiction: Canada
- Area: 114.97 square kilometres (44.39 sq mi)
- Population: 662,248
- Governing body: Vancouver Police Board
- Constituting instrument: BC Police Act
- General nature: Local civilian police

Operational structure
- Headquarters: 2120 Cambie Street/3585 Graveley Street
- Police Constables: 1,448 sworn officers (2023)
- Civilian Employees: 461 Civilian Employees
- Elected officers responsible: The Honourable Jessy Sahota, Minister of Public Safety and Solicitor General of British Columbia; His Worship Pete Fry, Mayor & Chair of the Vancouver Police Board
- Agency executive: Steve Rai, Chief Constable

Facilities
- Commands: 41 Divisions; 13 Transit Districts; 11 Housing Police Service Areas
- Police Cruisers: 449
- Police boats: 2
- Horses: 17
- Dogs: 18 German Shepherds/K-9 Units

Website
- vpd.ca

The Vancouver Police Department is the police force in Vancouver, British Columbia, Canada. It is one of several police departments within the Metro Vancouver Area and is the second largest police force in the province after RCMP "E" Division.

VPD was the first Canadian municipal police force to hire a female officer and the first to start a marine squad.

VPD, along with twelve other BC municipal police forces, seconds officers to the Combined Forces Special Enforcement Unit – British Columbia.

VPD now occupies the former Vancouver Organizing Committee for the 2010 Olympic and Paralympic Winter Games (VANOC) building at 3585 Graveley Street, which houses administrative and specialized investigation units.

== History ==
At the first meeting of Vancouver City Council, Vancouver's first police officer, Chief Constable John Stewart, was appointed on May 10, 1886.

On June 14, 1886, the morning after the Great Fire of 1886, Mayor McLean appointed Jackson Abray, V.W. Haywood, and John McLaren as special constables. With uniforms from Seattle and badges fashioned from American coins, this four man team became Vancouver's first police department based out of the City Hall tent at the foot of Carrall Street. These four were replaced in 1887 by special constables sent by the provincial government in Victoria for not keeping the peace during the anti-Asian unrest of that year. The strength of the force increased from four to fourteen as a result.

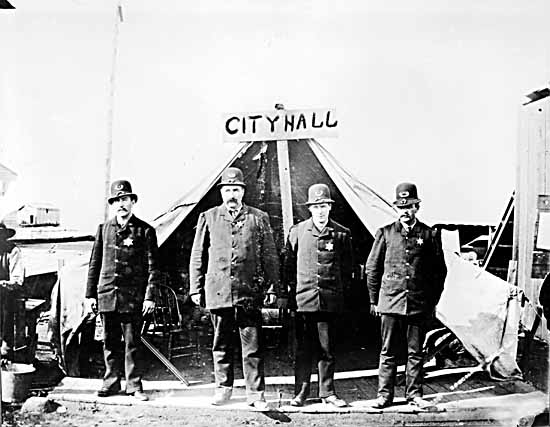
The first Vancouver Police Department posing after the Great Fire of 1886 razed the city

By 1904, the department had grown to 31 members and occupied a new police building at 200 Cordova Street. In 1912, Vancouver's first two women were taken on the force as matrons. With the amalgamation of Point Grey and South Vancouver with Vancouver in 1929, the department absorbed the two smaller police forces under the direction of Chief Constable W.J. Bingham, a former district supervisor with the Metropolitan Police in London. By the 1940s the department had grown to 570 members.

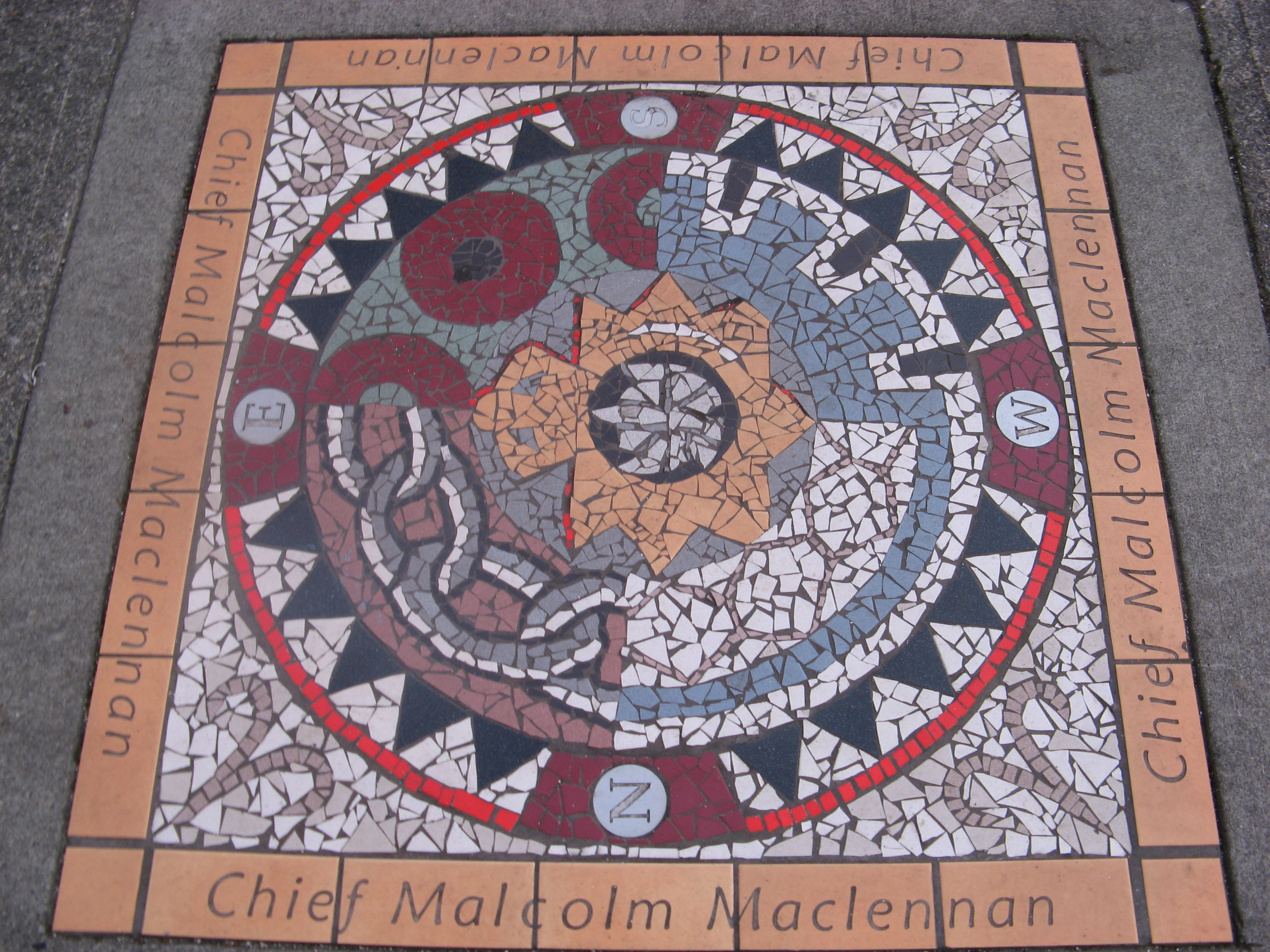
Mosaic marking the spot where Chief Constable McLennan was killed in 1917

In 1912, L.D. Harris and Minnie Miller were hired as the first two policewomen in Canada.

In 1917, Chief Constable McLennan was killed in the line of duty in a shoot-out in Vancouver's East End. Responding to a call by a landlord attempting to evict a tenant, the police were met by gunfire. Along with McLennan, the shooter was killed in the battle, as was a nine-year-old boy in the vicinity at Georgia and Jackson streets, which is now marked by a mosaic memorial. A detective who lost an eye in the shootout, John Cameron, later became the chief constable of the New Westminster Police Department before taking the top job of the Vancouver force, which he occupied from 1933 to the end of 1934.

Another member of the force was killed in the line of duty in 1922. Twenty-three-year-old constable, Robert McBeath, was shot by a man stopped for impaired driving. McBeath had received the Victoria Cross for "most conspicuous bravery" at the Battle of Cambrai in France in the First World War. McBeath's killer, Fred Deal, was initially sentenced to death, but won an appeal reducing it to life in prison because he had been beaten while in custody. The marine squad's boat, the R.G. McBeath VC, was commissioned in 1995 and named in honour of McBeath.

Plans for a new police building at 312 Main Street began in 1953. The Oakridge police station opened in 1961.

A police memorial at 325 Main St. is dedicated to the Vancouver Police Department members who died in the First and Second world wars and lists the Vancouver Police Department members killed in the line of duty in Vancouver.

In 1935, under Chief Constable W. W. Foster, the Vancouver Police Department was complemented with hundreds of special constables because of a waterfront strike led by communists, which culminated in the Battle of Ballantyne Pier, a riot that broke out when demonstrators attempted to march to the docks to confront strikebreakers. Also that year, nearly 2,000 unemployed men from the federal relief camps scattered throughout the province flocked to Vancouver to protest camp conditions. After two months of incessant demonstrations, the camp strikers left Vancouver and began the On-to-Ottawa Trek.

The Vancouver Police were at the centre of one of the biggest scandals in the city's history in 1955. Feeling frustrated that blatant police corruption was being ignored by the local media, a reporter for the Vancouver Daily Province switched to a Toronto-based tabloid, Flash. He wrote a sensational article alleging corruption at the highest levels of the police department in Vancouver, specifically, that a pay-off system had been implemented whereby gambling operations that paid the police were left alone and those that did not were harassed. After the Flash article appeared in Vancouver, the allegations could no longer be ignored, and a Royal Commission, the Tupper Commission, was struck to hold a public inquiry. Chief Constable Walter Mulligan fled to the United States, another officer from the upper ranks committed suicide, and still another attempted suicide rather than face the inquiry. Other scandals and public inquiries plagued the force before and since this one, dubbed the "Mulligan Affair", but none were so dramatic. An earlier inquiry into corruption in 1928 was ambiguous in its conclusions as to the extent of the problem. The last major inquiry into policing in Vancouver focused largely on police accountability. Judge Wally Oppal (later provincial attorney general), submitted the results of his report in 1994 in a four volume package entitled Closing the Gap: Policing and the Community.

Leonard Hogue, a constable in the police department, was the perpetrator in the 1965 Coquitlam Massacre.

In 2009, the RCMP "E" Division joined forces with VPD to operate the Integrated National Security Enforcement Team (INSET)—Vancouver, operating out of VPD facilities instead of the INSET-BC Surrey operation base.

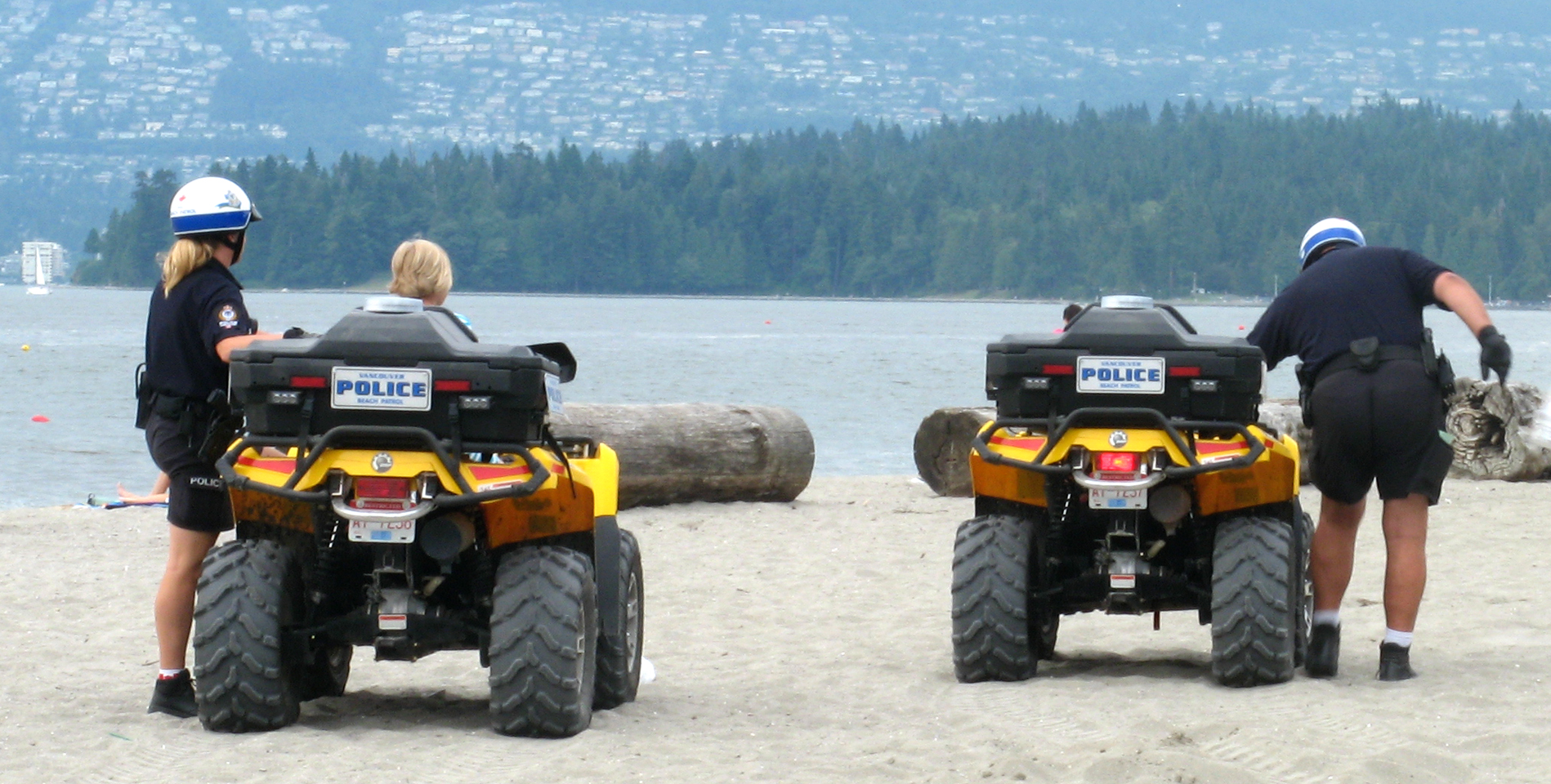
VPD beach patrol at Kitsilano Beach

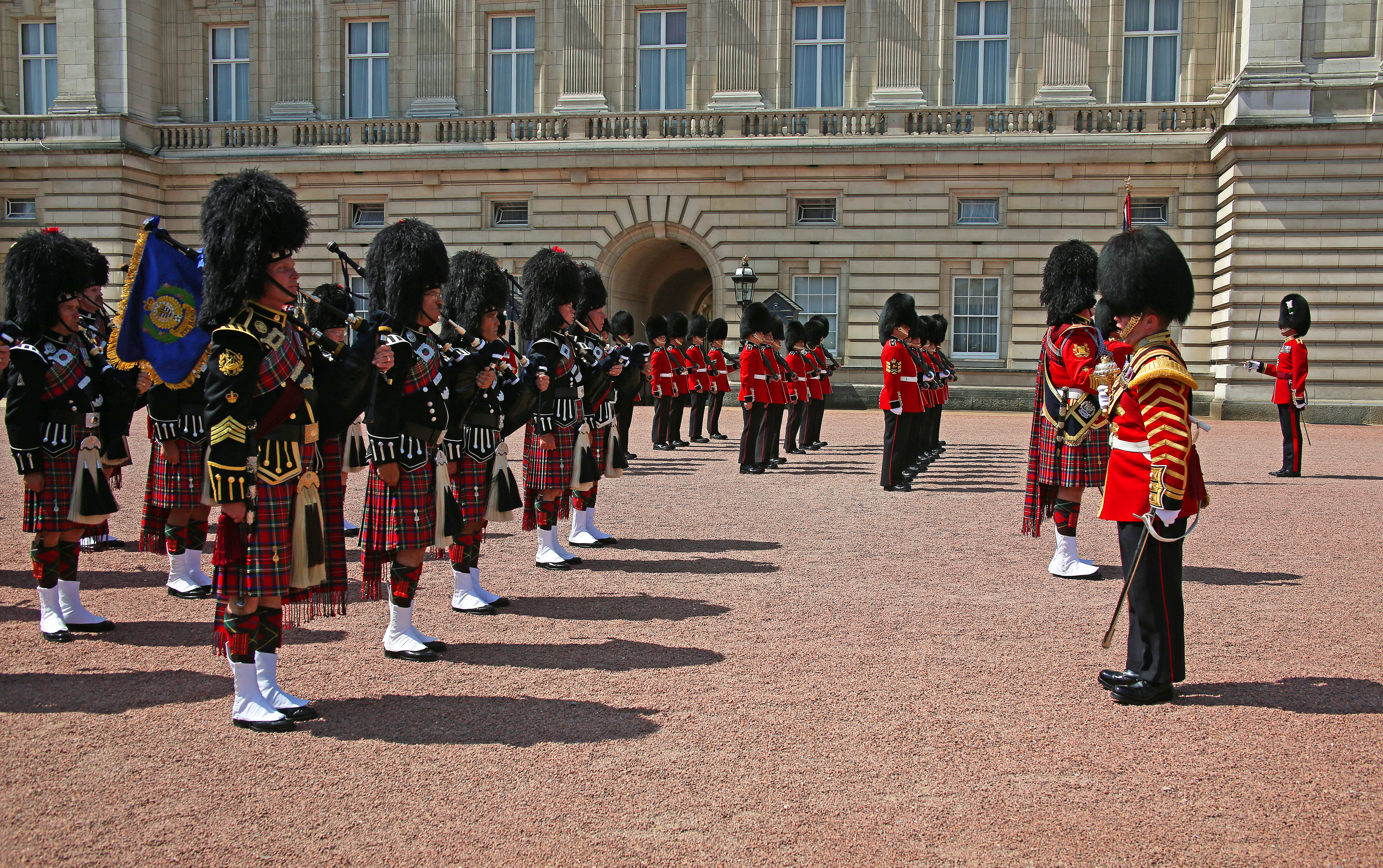
Members of the Vancouver Police Pipe Band outside Buckingham Palace, June 2014

== Community policing centres ==
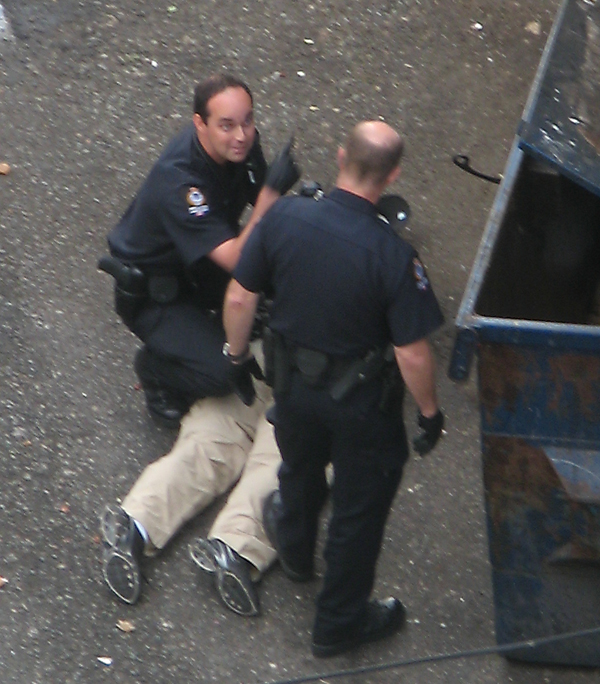
Vancouver police officers making an arrest in the Downtown Eastside

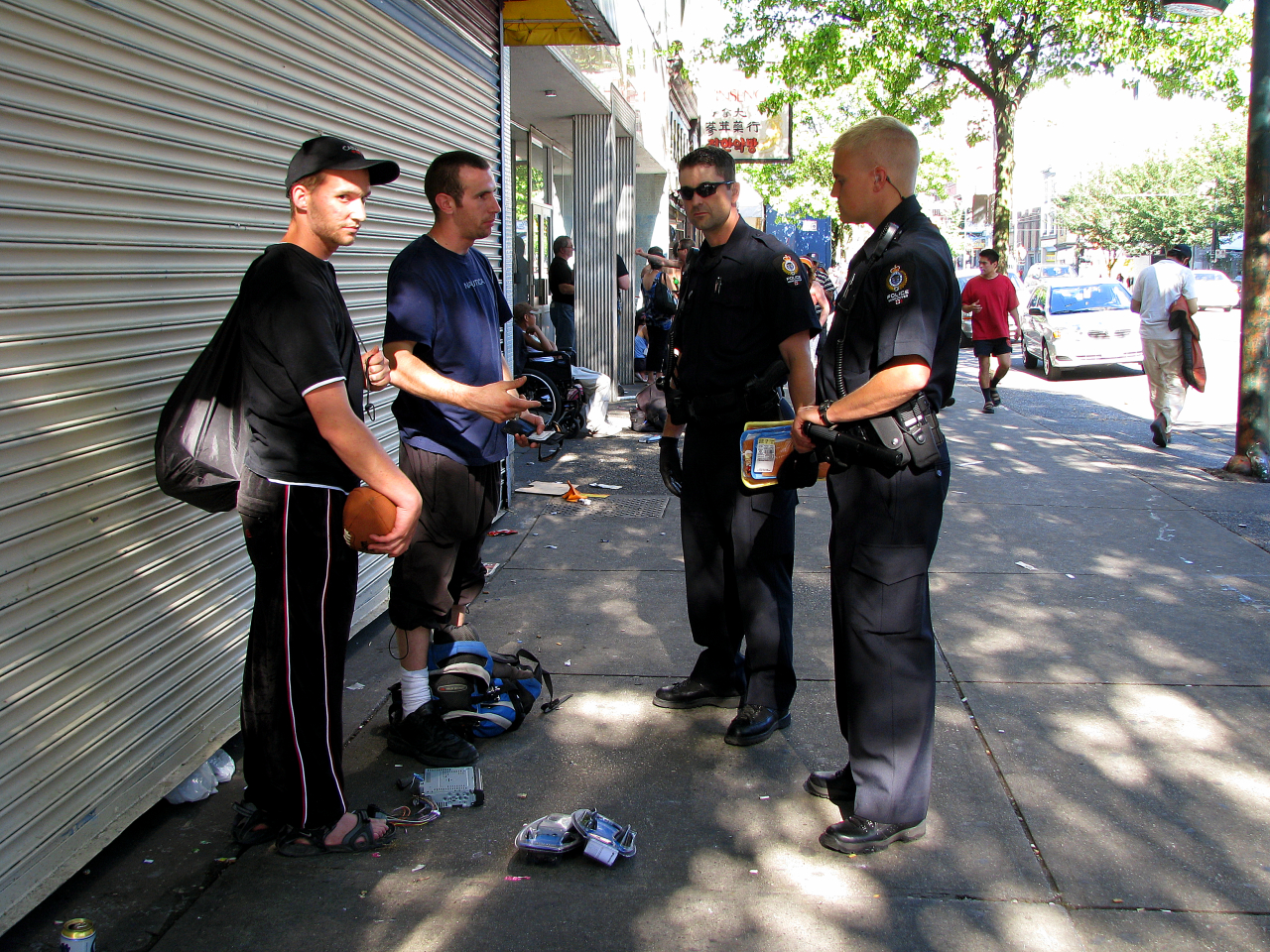
Vancouver Police officers ordering two sidewalk vendors to leave the area

=== Organization ===
Community policing centres (CPCs), except the Granville Downtown and Kitsilano Fairview CPCs, are run by registered societies. The Granville Downtown CPC is under the direct control of the District 1 commander whereas Kitsilano Fairview is under the District 4 commander.

=== Salary ===
As of 2026, VPD constable pay ranges from 93,390 (probationary to $133,847 (first-class, after four years of service) with senior constable to reach up to 115% of the first-class rate through professional development, the department also offers substantial overtime opportunities.

=== Operation ===
CPCs are run by volunteers on a day-to-day basis with the supervision from paid staffs. Each year, the VPD audits all the CPCs and then reports to the city council on budgeting.

Each CPC is assigned a neighbourhood police officer (NPO) who provides resources and guidance for the operation of the CPC.

=== Programs ===
Each CPC offers different programs based on budget and neighbourhood needs. For example:

- Taking non-emergency/lost and found property reports
- Project Griffin
- Working in conjunction with the Insurance Corporation of British Columbia for the Speed Watch Program
- Working in conjunction with the Insurance Corporation of British Columbia for the Stolen Auto Recovery Program
- Working in conjunction with the VPD for the Block Watch Program
- Community patrol (foot and bike)
- Bike Roadeo, program for young children in bike safety
- Outreach and education programs
- Engraving
- Community cleanup
- Child Find
- Citizen's Crime Watch

However, CPCs do not offer any of the following services:

- Taking emergency report
- Criminal record checks
- Law/bylaw enforcement
- Legal/policing advice
- Victim services
- Situations that requires police attendance/assistance

== Departmental organization ==
Overseen by the Police Board, the 1,716 employees of the VPD have been led by Chief Constable Steve Rai since May 22, 2025, following the departure of Adam Palmer, who retired in order to join the Royal Canadian Mounted Police. The force has seven operating divisions assigned to the Chief Constable:

=== Operations Division ===
Vancouver Traffic Authority shoulder flash

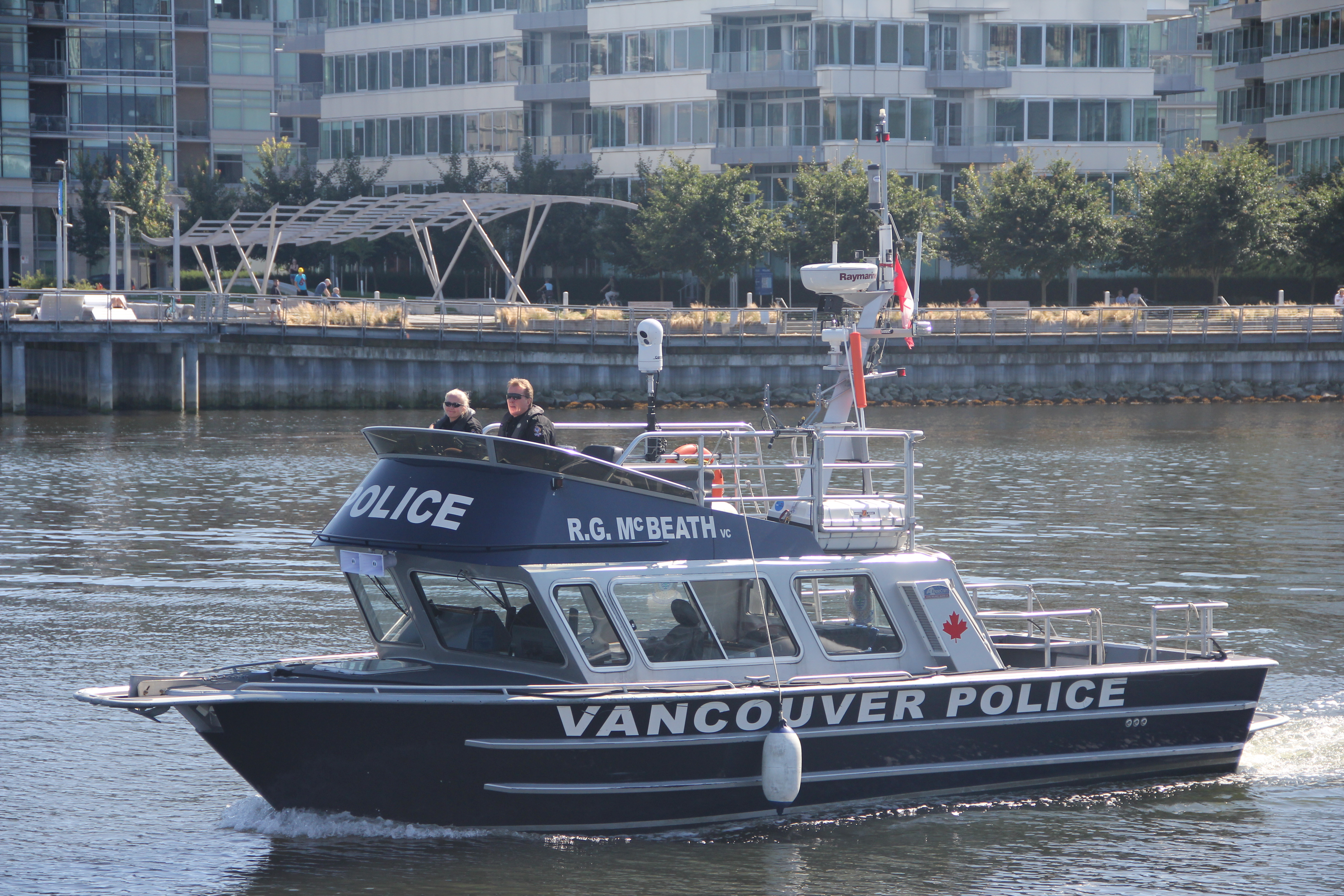
Vancouver Police vessel

Led by Deputy Chief Constable Alison Laurin since 2025.

==== Operations Command ====
- District 1
- District 2
- District 3
- District 4
- Diversity, Community, & Indigenous Relations

==== Operations Support Command ====
- Operations Support Section
- Duty Officers
- Court & Detention Services Section
- Traffic Section
- Emergency Response Section

==== Emergency Management & Major Events Command ====
- Emergency & Operational Planning Section
- 2026 FIFA World Cup Issue

=== Investigation Division ===
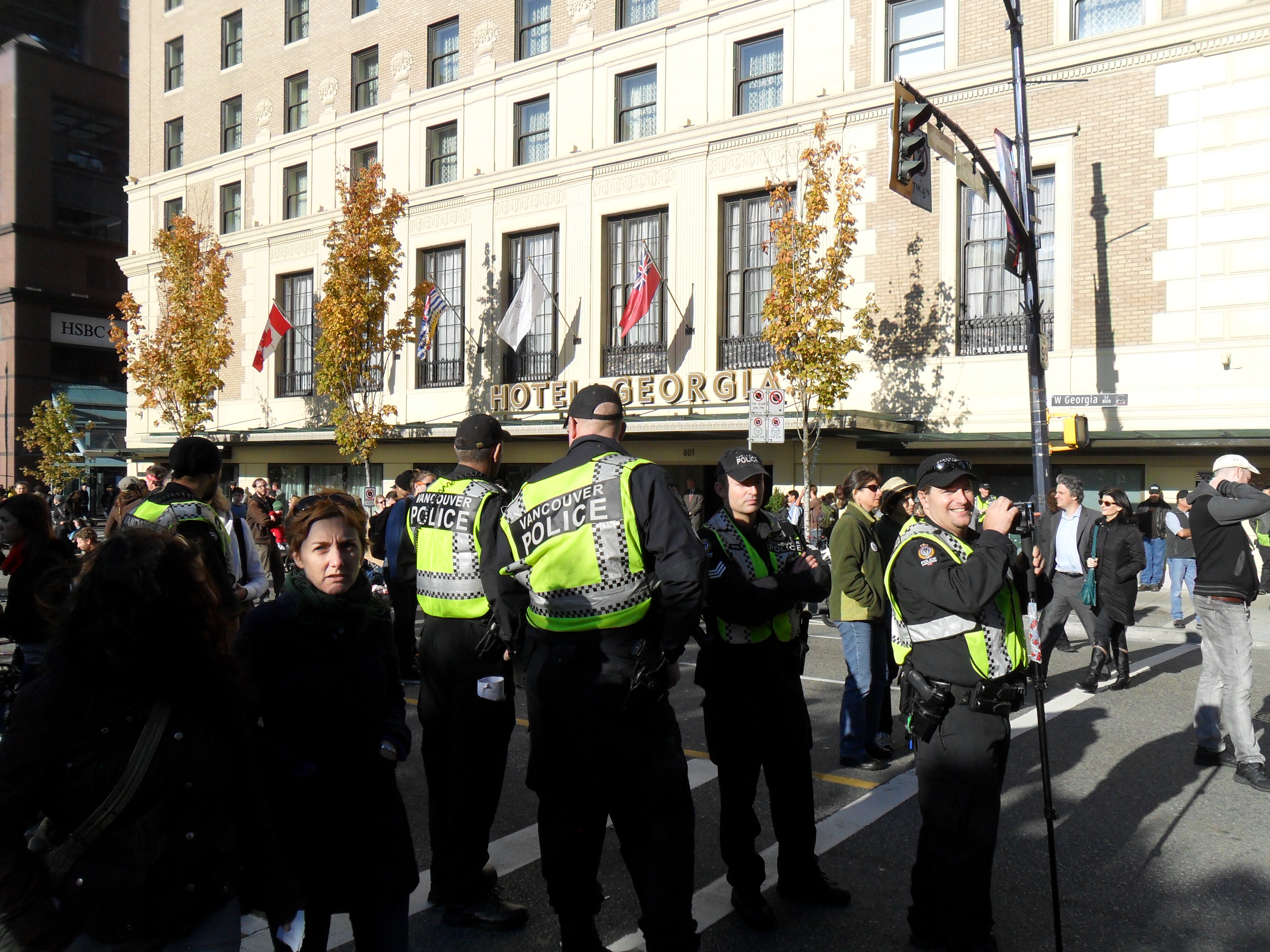
Vancouver Police at an Occupy Vancouver gathering

Led by Senior Deputy Chief Constable Howard Chow since 2025.

Investigative Services

- Major Crime Section
- Organized Crime Section
- Special Investigation Section

Investigative Support Services

- Tactical Support Section
- Forensic Services Section
- General Investigation Section
- Youth Services Section
- Body Worn Camera Section

=== Executive Services ===
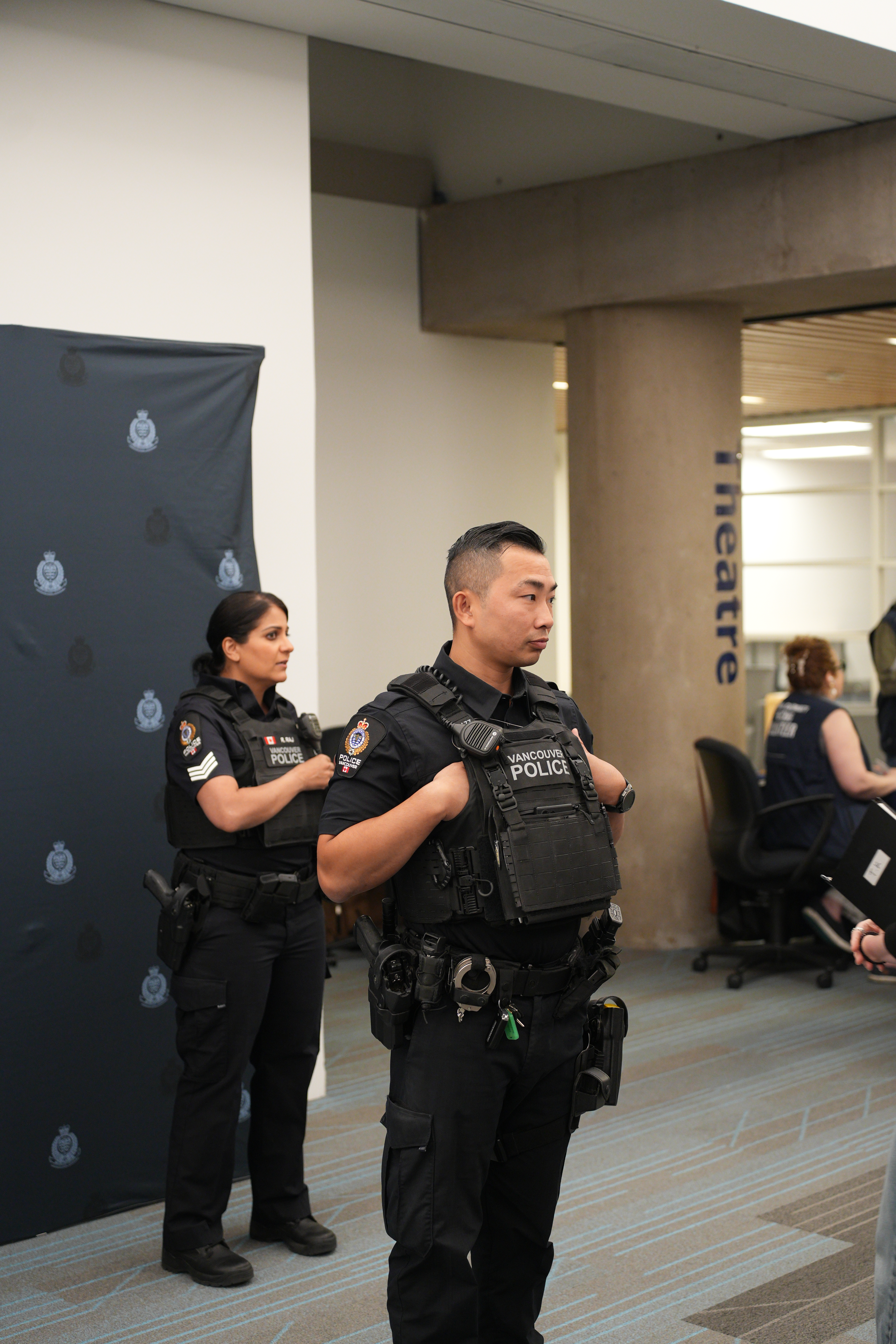
Vancouver Police Department officers at a media event

Led by Inspector Kevin Bernardin.

=== Public Affairs ===
Led by Inspector Shaun Deans.

=== Support Services Division ===
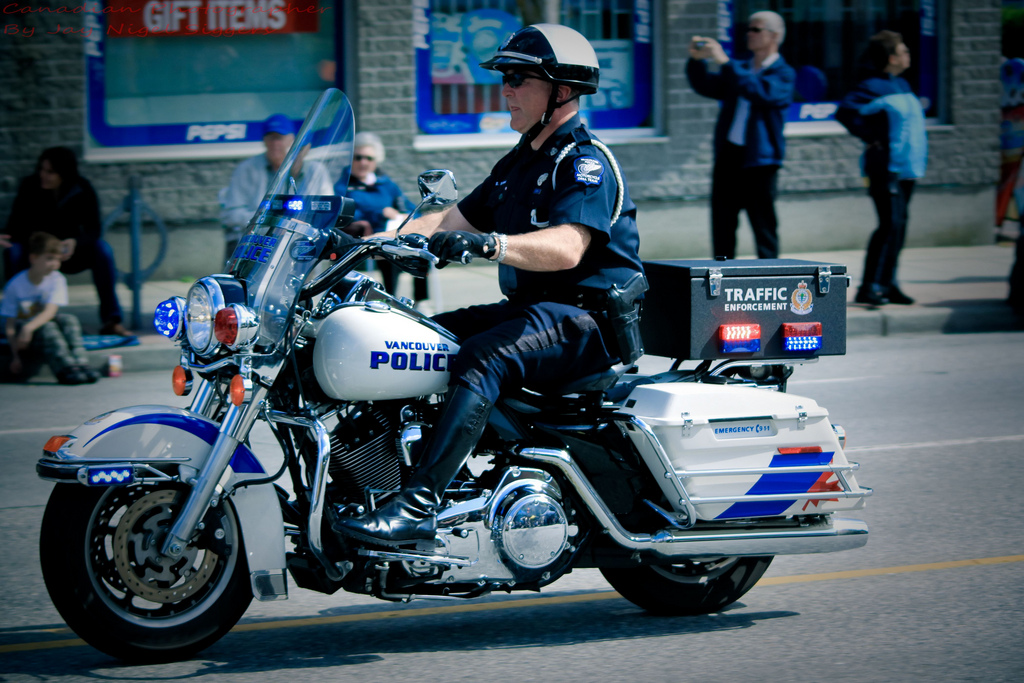
A Vancouver Police Department officer on a motorbike

Led by Deputy Chief Constable Andrew Chan since 2025.

==== Personnel Services ====
Led by Superintendent Shelley Horne.

- Human Resources Section
- Training & Recruiting Section
- Professional Standards Section
- Labour & Employee Relations Services

==== Information Services ====
Led by Superintendent Tyrone Sideroff.

- Information & Communication Technology Section
- Information Management Section
- Fleet Operations Section
- Facilities Section
- Property & Forensic Storage Section
- Information & Privacy Section
- Enterprise Risk Management Section

==== Financial Services ====
Led by Chief Financial Officer Nancy Eng.

=== Strategy & Innovation Division ===
Led by Deputy Chief Constable Don Chapman since 2025.

== Union ==
The Vancouver Police Union is a trade union that represents 1,450 front-line police officers, jail guards and special constables of the Vancouver Police Department.

== Rank structure ==
Chief constable	Deputy chief constable	Superintendent	Inspector	Staff sergeant	Sergeant	Police constable 1st class/Detective	Police constable 2nd class	Police constable 3rd class	Police constable 4th class

- Special municipal constable (traffic authority/jail guard/community safety personnel)

== List of chief constables ==
Number	Name	Tenure
1	John Stewart	1886–1890
2	John McLaren	1890–1895
3	William Ward	1895–1896
4	John Stewart	1896–1901
5	Samuel North	1901-1906
6	Colin Chisholm	1906–1907
7	Rufus Chamberlin	1907–1912
8	Charles Mulhern	1913–1914
9	Malcolm MacLennan	1914–1917
10	William McRae	1917–1920
11	James Anderson	1920–1924
12	Henry "Harry" Long	1924–1929
13	William Bingham	1929–1931
14	Charles Edgar Edgett	1931–1933
15	John Cameron	1933–1935
16	William Wasbrough Foster	1935–1941
17	Donald MacKay	1941–1945
18	Alexander McNeill	1945–1947
19	Walter Mulligan	1947–1955
20	George Archer	1955–1962
21	Ralph Booth	1962–1968
22	John Fisk	1968–1974
23	Don Winterton	1974–1981
24	Robert Stewart	1981–1991
25	William Marshall	1991–1994
26	Raymond Canuel	1994–1997
27	Bruce Chambers	1997–1999
28	Terry Blythe	1999–2002
29	Jamie Graham	2002–2007
30	Jim Chu	2007–2015
31	Adam Palmer	2015–2025
32	Steve Rai	2025–present

== Controversies ==
=== Battle of Ballantyne Pier ===
On 18 June 1935, roughly 1,000 longshoremen and their supporters marched towards the Heatley Street entrance to Ballantyne Pier as a demonstration for more livable wages. They were led by Victoria Cross recipient Mickey O'Rourke and a contingent of World War I veterans and marched behind a Union Jack flag, to great symbolic effect. They soon encountered the Vancouver police, who partook in mass brutality. Many, including bystanders, were injured. In light of the injuries, the Ukrainian Community Centre was used as a makeshift hospital. Members of the women's auxiliary operated the centre, before the Vancouver police threw tear gas into the first-aid centre. The strike, in congruence with other, similar West Coast strikes, led to the right to collective bargaining and the creation of International Longshore and Warehouse Union.

=== Bloody Sunday ===
Bloody Sunday was a 1938 confrontation between peaceful sit-in strikers and the VPD, along with other forces. After mass unemployment across Canada, many people migrated to Vancouver for job opportunities. When unemployment persisted and workers felt no financial relief, they organized a massive peaceful demonstration, occurring in multiple locations for an entire month. Protesters occupied Hotel Georgia, the Vancouver Art Gallery (then located at 1145 West Georgia Street), and the main post office (now the Sinclair Centre). Later that day, 10,000 supporters went to Oppenheimer Park in condemnation of excessive police force of the Vancouver Police Department.

Vancouver Police Department (VPD ) officers staffing a traffic barricade on Fraser Street during the Vaisakhi Parade in South Vancouver.

=== Gastown riots ===
Also known as "The Battle of Maple Tree Square", Vancouver Police attacked a peaceful protest in the Gastown neighbourhood on August 7, 1971. The protestors opposed the use of coercive undercover police tactics. The Vancouver Police were accused of heavy-handed tactics such as indiscriminate beatings with their batons and charging on horseback at crowds of onlookers and tourists.

=== Investigation of Robert Pickton ===
Between 1997 and 2002, serial killer Robert Pickton murdered at least 26 women and claimed to have killed 49 women. Many of his victims were sex workers from Vancouver's Downtown East Side. The VPD was criticized for slow-rolling the investigation and ignoring evidence of a serial killer as a result of biases against women, Indigenous people, and sex workers. A public inquiry into the investigation of Robert Pickton identified several failures of police including: failure to take and act on reports of missing women, failure to use additional information to identify the presence of a serial killer, inadequate investigative strategies, and failure to coordinate between police agencies in Metro Vancouver.

=== Killing of Myles Gray ===
On August 13th, 2015, Myles Gray was making a delivery as part of his job for Florists Supply Limited. The VPD were called after he sprayed a woman with a hose and appeared to be having a mental health incident. Seven VPD officers ultimately arrived at the scene and intervened to stop him while he was pacing in a wooded backyard. During the ensuing confrontation, Gray sustained multiple injuries including ruptured testicles, a broken voice box, a fractured eye socket and widespread bruising. Gray ultimately died of the injuries sustained during this beating. The killing led to public outcry and to the convening of a public hearing led by the Office of the Police Complaint Commissioner. The officers involved are accused of using excessive force as well as neglect of duty for failing to take notes on the incident. Several of the officers involved claimed that the Vancouver Police Union instructed them not to take notes.

=== Killing of Chris Amyotte ===
On August 22nd, 2022, Chris Amyotte died after being shot multiple times with a bean bag gun by the VPD. Amyotte was an Ojibway man from Winnipeg who was visiting Vancouver. Amyotte was sprayed with bear mace in a random attack in Vancouver's Downtown East Side. He attempted to remove the bear spray by tearing off his clothes and dousing his face with water from a convenience store. The VPD responded to the scene and shot Amyotte multiple times with a bean bag gun before taking him into custody. Amyotte died while in police custody. The Union of British Columbia Indian Chiefs called for a public inquiry into the incident citing "a chronic lack of accountability and ongoing violence and murder of Indigenous peoples" and criticizing the Independent Investigations Office ability to hold the police accountable.

== Geography ==
The VPD is divided into four geographic districts, with one additional task force:

- District 1: Downtown, Granville, West End and Coal Harbour
- District 2: Grandview-Woodland and Hastings-Sunrise
- District 3: Collingwood and South Vancouver
- District 4: Kerrisdale, Oakridge, Dunbar, West Point Grey, Kitsilano, Arbutus, Shaughnessy, Fairview, Musqueam and Marpole
- Beat Enforcement Team: Downtown Eastside, Chinatown and Gastown

== Fleet ==
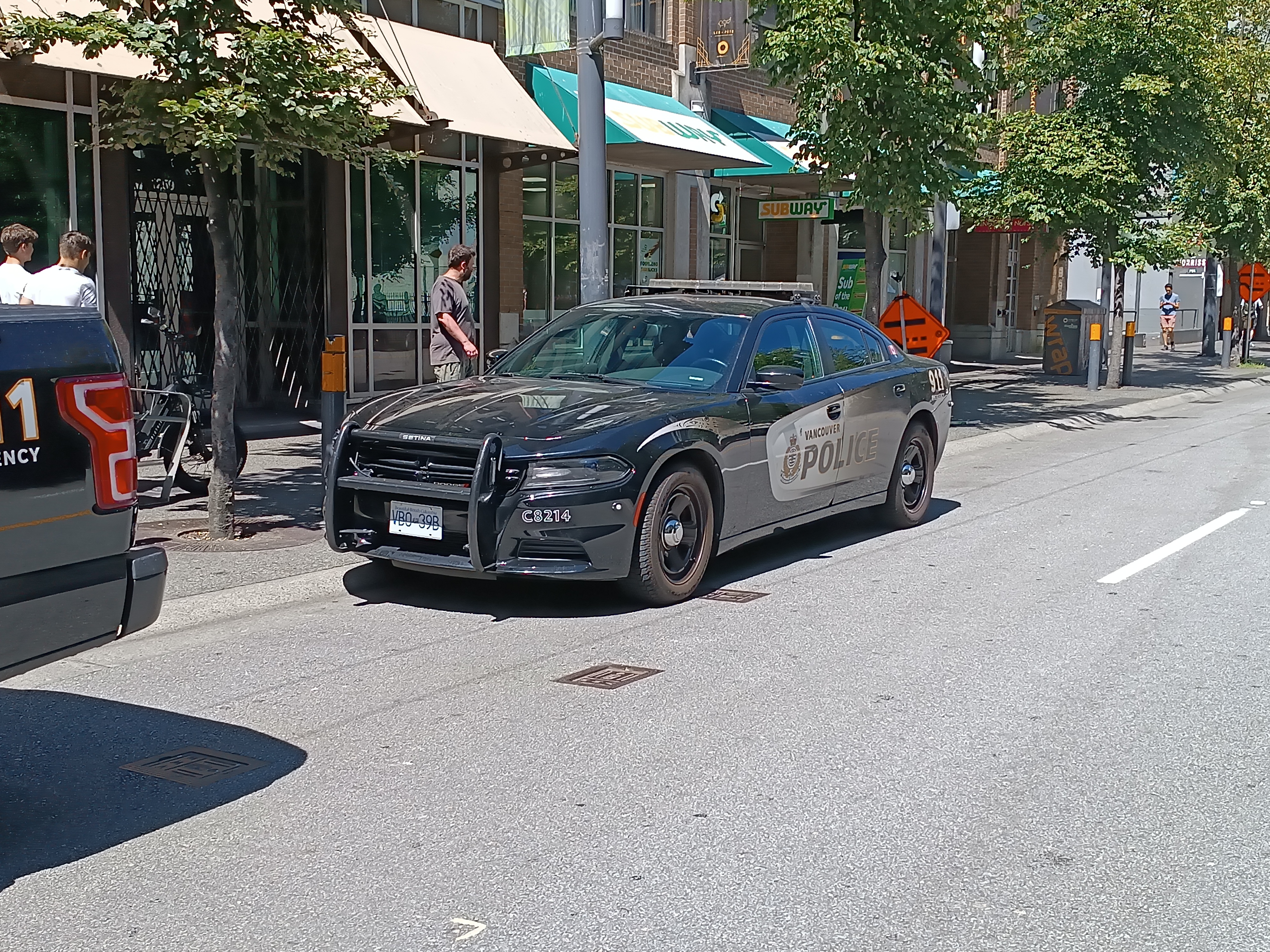
Dodge Charger

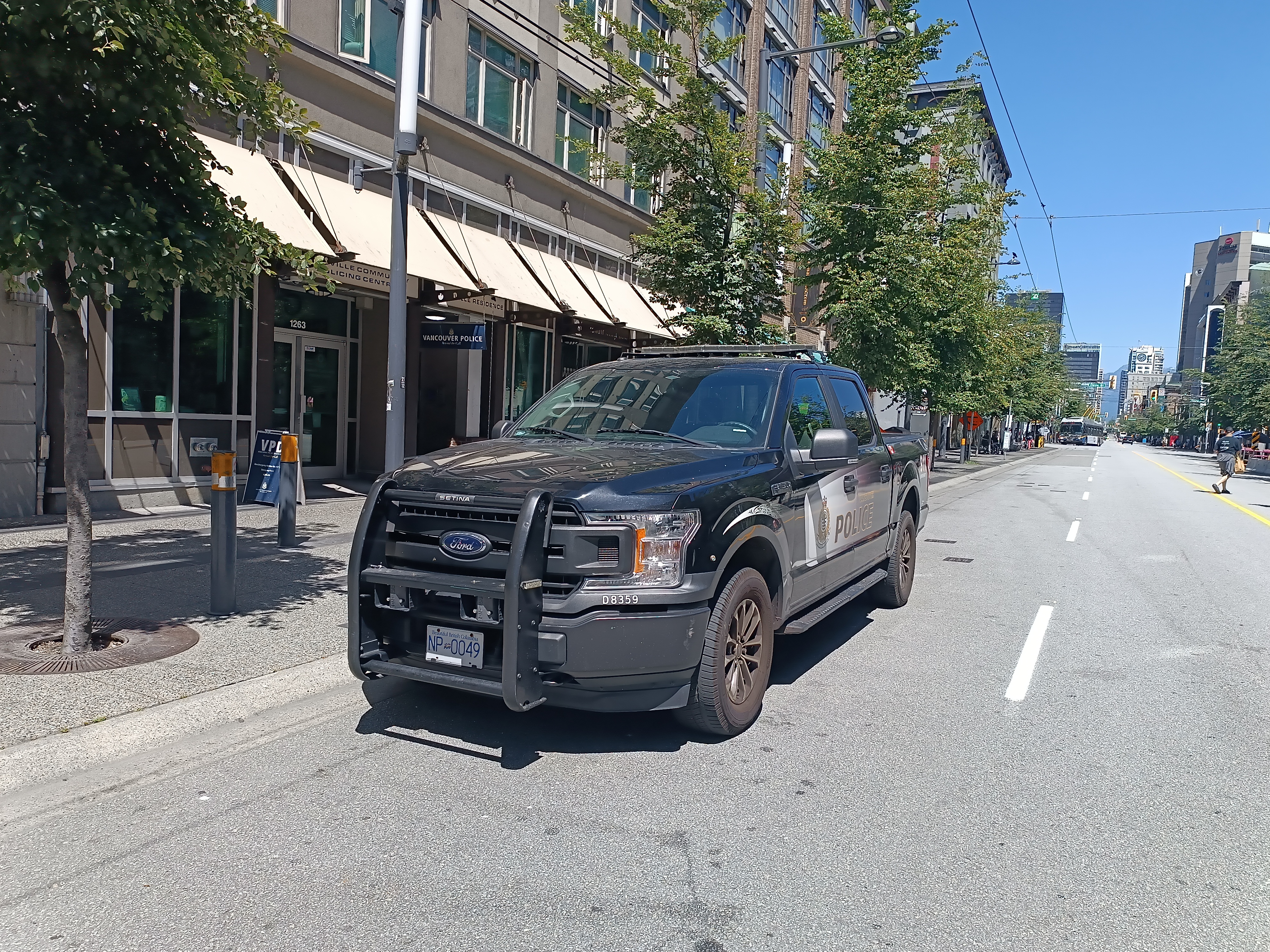
Ford F-150

- Eurocopter EC120 Colibri (air patrol operations shared with RCMP "E" Division)
- Ford Crown Victoria Police Interceptor (being phased out)
- Lenco BearCat (APC - purchase approved)
- Cambli International Thunder 1 (ARV—delivered 2010 for ERT use)
- Ford Police Interceptor Sedan (two unmarked black demonstration units that were kept)
- Dodge Charger Pursuit (replacement for Ford Crown Victoria)
- Ford Police Interceptor Utility (marked, unmarked, and supervisor vehicles)
- Chevrolet Tahoe (unmarked SUVs)
- Ford Fusion (CSP/special investigations)
- Ford F-150 (traffic authority)
- Ford F-350 (ERT)
- Ford Expedition (ERT)
- Mobile Command Centre (Communications use and transportation of command members).

== See also ==
- Combined Forces Special Enforcement Unit – British Columbia
- E-Comm, 9-1-1 call and dispatch centre for Southwestern BC
- Project Griffin, crime prevention/reduction program launched in 2009
- RCMP "E" Division—British Columbia's contract policing for surrounding areas (UBC, Burnaby, Surrey, etc.)
- Metro Vancouver Transit Police
- Vancouver Police Pipe Band
- Bloody Sunday (1938)
- Internment of Japanese Canadians
- Gastown riots
- Missing and murdered Indigenous women
