= Alexander McDonald (Canadian politician) =

Member of the Legislative Assembly of British Columbia
- In office 1933–1937
- Preceded by: MacGregor MacIntosh
- Succeeded by: MacGregor MacIntosh
- Constituency: The Islands

Personal details
- Born: November 1, 1876 Sidney, British Columbia
- Died: November 20, 1945 (aged 69) Sidney, British Columbia
- Party: British Columbia Liberal Party
- Spouse(s): Jane McGill; Svea Muriel Larson
- Occupation: farmer

Alexander McDonald (November 1, 1876 – November 20, 1945) was a Canadian politician. He served in the Legislative Assembly of British Columbia from 1933 until his defeat in the 1937 provincial election, from the electoral district of The Islands, a member of the Liberal party. Following his defeat, McDonald never did seek reelection to the Legislature in a subsequent election.
