= William Wasbrough Foster =

Canadian mountaineer, politician and businessman

William Wasbrough Foster CMG, DSO, VD
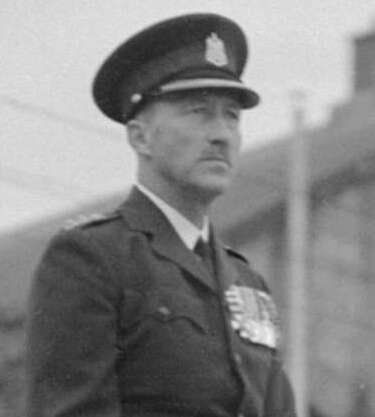
- Colonel W. W. Foster as Vancouver's chief constable in 1935

Chief Constable of Vancouver, British Columbia
- In office 1935–1939

Member of the Legislative Assembly of British Columbia
- In office 1913–1916
- Preceded by: Albert Edward McPhillips
- Succeeded by: Malcolm Bruce Jackson
- Constituency: The Islands

Personal details
- Born: 1 October 1875 Bristol, England
- Died: 2 December 1954 (aged 79) Vancouver, British Columbia, Canada
- Party: Conservative Party of British Columbia
- Education: Wycliffe College
- Occupation: Constable; businessman; soldier; mountaineer

Major-General William Wasbrough Foster, CMG, DSO, VD (1 October 1875 – 2 December 1954) was a noted mountaineer, Conservative Party politician, businessman, and chief constable in British Columbia, Canada, in addition to his distinguished military career. Foster was elected to the BC Legislature in a 1913 byelection. He was defeated for re-election in the 1916, 1924, and 1933 provincial elections.

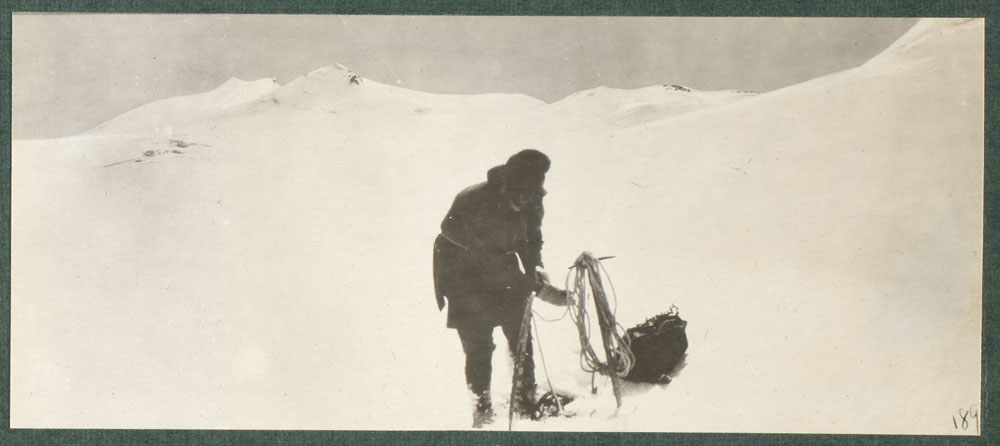
Foster during a 1925 expedition

== Early life ==
Known as Billy to friends and family, Foster was born in Bristol, England. He studied engineering at Wycliffe College before he emigrated to British Columbia in 1894, where he became involved in the lucrative lumber business. He served with the Canadian Pacific Railway as a superintendent and police magistrate in Revelstoke, manager for the Globe Lumber Company on Vancouver Island, President of the Conservative Party of British Columbia, provincial Member of the Legislative Assembly, and Minister of Public Works prior to the Great War. Foster was an avid mountaineer and was on the first expeditions to climb Mount Robson and Canada's highest peak, Mount Logan.

Foster served as the president of the Alpine Club of Canada and has a mountain on Vancouver Island named in his honour, Mount Colonel Foster, as well as Foster Peak in the Canadian Rockies. He was also an honorary initiate of the BC Alpha chapter of the Phi Delta Theta fraternity at the University of British Columbia.

In World War I, he fought in the Somme and Vimy Ridge battles and reached the rank of lieutenant colonel and was awarded the DSO. He was twice wounded and mentioned in dispatches five times.

== Industrial relations ==
Foster worked as the managing director of Evans, Coleman and Evans, a timber exporting company on Vancouver's waterfront after the war that was a constituent member of the Shipping Federation of British Columbia, established by railway, stevedoring, and storage companies to manage commercial operations on the Port of Vancouver.

In 1923, Foster headed the Shipping Federation's protection committee, and organised a group of 144 special constables, who were sworn in and given badges and guns by the Vancouver Police Department. Their job was to protect over 1000 strikebreakers, composed mainly of high school and University of British Columbia students, to break a longshoremen's strike and crush the Vancouver local of the International Longshoremen's Association.

The strike and the union were broken, and the longshoremen were organised into a new company union, the Vancouver and District Waterfront Workers' Association. Within a decade, however, communist organisers would transform the union into a militant union, which again would come into conflict with Colonel Foster.

== Chief constable ==
Foster probably gained his greatest local notoriety in Vancouver when he was appointed chief constable of the Vancouver Police Department on 3 January 1935. He came in during a shake-up and purge of the police to prepare the civic government forces for a showdown with the local communist movement. The Communist Party of Canada's trade union umbrella, the Workers' Unity League, was planning a general strike for May 1935, and the local big business interests claimed that it was to be the beginning of a Bolshevik revolution in Canada.

The general strike and revolution never happened, but the city was flooded in the spring of 1935 with striking relief camp workers, which metamorphosed into the On-to-Ottawa Trek that left Vancouver atop boxcars in early June. Foster restructured the police department significantly, and led an effort to eradicate crime and vice from the city. He initiated the first training of Vancouver police officers, updated police uniforms, added tear gas to the police arsenal, and established a "Communist Activities Branch" to gather intelligence.

On one occasion, he used his influence to have a bylaw passed banning white women from working in Chinatown restaurants on the assumption that they were being lured into prostitution, or "white slavery" as it was known at the time, with Chinese clients. The move sparked a backlash from Chinese businessmen and from women who had lost their jobs from restaurants, which had their business licences revoked. Business licences were restored only when the owners agreed not longer employ white women any longer, and at least thirty women were forced to seek other employment.

== Battle of Ballantyne Pier ==
Foster had somewhat of a showdown with communism during the Battle of Ballantyne Pier on 18 June 1935 when a group of about 1000 longshoremen and supporters marched behind a contingent of war veterans carrying the Union Jack headed towards the waterfront, where strikebreakers were unloading ships. Foster and contingents from the city, provincial, and federal police forces drove the protesters back with truncheons and tear gas. Protestors fought back, and for three hours, police and demonstrators clashed in the streets of Vancouver's East End. One youth was shot in the back of his legs by a police shot gun, and many protesters and police required hospital treatment after the riot.

== Later life ==
Foster remained active in veteran affairs during peacetime and was the president of the Royal Canadian Legion from 1938 to 1940. His career as chief constable was cut short when he was called off to war in 1939. During the Second World War, he was promoted to major general.

In April 1943, Foster was enlisted by Prime Minister Mackenzie King to serve as Commissioner of Defense Projects in Canada's northwest. King described him in his diary as "A very fine fellow with lots of tact. I think he will be an ideal man for the position; also an ex-President of the war veterans. He has knowledge and carries with him authority and has fine organizing ability."

Canada was then co-operating with the United States on infrastructure projects in the Northwest that would have implications on postwar bilateral relations. Foster's role was to make sure "that no commitments are made and no situation allowed to develop as a result of which the full Canadian control of the area would be in any way prejudiced or endangered."

After the war, Foster was appointed the head of BC Hydro, where he again attempted to fight off the forces of unionisation.
