= Charles William Train =

British Army soldier

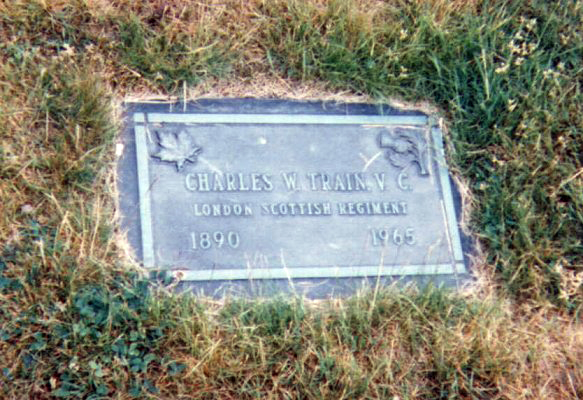
- Born: 21 September 1890; London, England
- Died: 28 March 1965 (aged 74); Vancouver, British Columbia
- Burial place: Forest Lawn Memorial Park, Burnaby, British Columbia
- Military career
- Allegiance: United Kingdom
- Branch: British Army
- Service years: 1909 - 1919
- Rank: Sergeant
- Service number: 510051
- Unit: London Regiment
- Conflicts: World War I
- Awards: Victoria Cross

Sergeant Charles William Train VC (21 September 1890 – 28 March 1965) was a British Army soldier and an English-born recipient of the Victoria Cross (VC), the highest British honour awarded for gallantry in the presence of the enemy. It was awarded in the First World War to British and Dominion forces and the Indian Army.

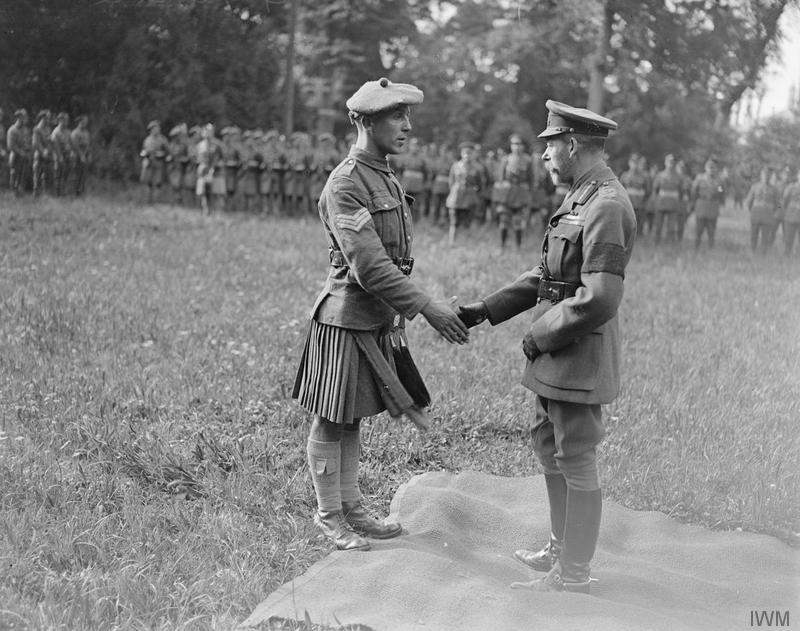
King George V investing Sergeant Charles William Train of the 2/14th Battalion, London Regiment (2nd Battalion, London Scottish) with the Victoria Cross at the Second Army Headquarters. Blendecques, 6 August 1918.

He was 27 years old, and a corporal in the 2/14th (County of London) Battalion, The London Regiment (London Scottish), British Army, 179th (2/4th London) Brigade, British 60th Division when the following deed took place for which he was awarded the VC.

On 8 December 1917 at Ein Kerem, near Jerusalem, in Ottoman controlled Palestine, when his company was unexpectedly engaged at close range by a party of the enemy with two machine-guns and brought to a standstill, Corporal Train on his own initiative rushed forward and engaged the enemy with rifle grenades and succeeded in putting some of the team out of action by a direct hit. He shot and wounded an officer and killed or wounded the remainder of the team. After this he went to the assistance of a comrade who was bombing the enemy from the front and killed one of them who was carrying the second machine-gun out of action.

In May 1918, many British units serving with the Egyptian Expeditionary Force in the Palestine campaign were sent to the Western Front. The 2/14th Battalion, The London Regiment Regiment moved to France and in July joined the 90th Brigade of the British 30th Division. It was while serving in France that he was presented with the insignia of the Victoria Cross by King George V at Headquarters, 2nd Army, Blendecques on 6 August 1918.

He later achieved the rank of sergeant. He is buried at Forest Lawn Memorial Park in Burnaby, British Columbia, Canada.

His VC is displayed at the London Scottish Regimental Museum in London, England.

== Bibliography ==
- Gliddon, Gerald (2005). The Sideshows. VCs of the First World War. Gloucestershire, England: Sutton Publishing. ISBN 978-0-7509-2084-1.
