= Michael James O'Rourke =

Michael James O'Rourke VC MM
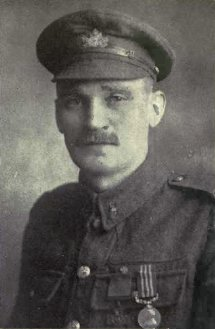
- Born: 19 March 1878; County Limerick, Ireland
- Died: 6 December 1957 (aged 79); Burnaby, British Columbia, Canada
- Burial place: Forest Lawn Memorial Park, Burnaby, British Columbia, Canada
- Military career
- Allegiance: Canada
- Branch: Canadian Expeditionary Force
- Rank: Private
- Units: Royal Munster Fusiliers; 7th Battalion (1st British Columbia), CEF
- Conflicts: World War I Interwar period in Canada: Battle of Ballantyne Pier
- Awards: Victoria Cross; Military Medal

Michael James "Mickey" O'Rourke VC, MM (March 19, 1878 – December 6, 1957), was an Irish-Canadian soldier and dockworker. O'Rourke was a recipient of the Victoria Cross, the highest, most prestigious decoration for gallantry in the face of the enemy that can be awarded to British and Commonwealth forces.

== Early life ==
There is little documentation of O'Rourke's life prior to World War I. Born in Limerick, Ireland, he served in the Royal Munster Fusiliers before emigrating to Canada where he joined the Canadian militia in Revelstoke, British Columbia. He also worked as a miner.

== World War I ==
O'Rourke joined the Canadian Expeditionary Force in February 1915. He had already been awarded the Military Medal for bravery at the Battle of the Somme when, as a member of the 7th (1st British Columbia) Battalion, the following action took place for which he was awarded the Victoria Cross.

From August 15 to 17, 1917, during the Battle of Hill 70 near Lens, France, Private Michael James O'Rourke served as a stretcher-bearer. Records indicate that he worked for a period of three days and nights to retrieve the wounded, provide medical dressing, and distribute supplies. During this time, the area was under machine-gun, rifle, and artillery fire, with shell explosions affecting his immediate position. His sustained presence in the field was noted by other ranks, and his actions resulted in the evacuation of multiple casualties.

== Later life ==
After the war, O'Rourke went to California, then returned to British Columbia where he eked out an existence on Vancouver's skid road, surviving on a disability pension of 10 dollars per month and casual work on the docks. During the Vancouver longshoremen's strike of 1935, he headed a protest march of about 1,000 strikers, wearing his medals and carrying the Union Jack. The marchers attempted to pass a police line guarding the waterfront and were attacked with clubs and tear gas in what came to be known as the Battle of Ballantyne Pier.

O'Rourke's later life was complicated by war-related chronic health problems and alcoholism. He died as an indigent at a Veterans' Affairs facility in Burnaby, BC, on December 6, 1957. His grave is located at Forest Lawn Memorial Park in Burnaby.
