= Vancouver and District Waterfront Workers' Association =

Canadian trade union

V.D.W.W.A.
- Vancouver and District Waterfront Workers' Association
- Founded: 1923
- Dissolved: 1935
- Location: Canada

The Vancouver and District Waterfront Association was the union for longshoremen working on Vancouver's waterfront between 1923 and 1935. It was established as a company union by the Shipping Federation of British Columbia after it defeated a strike and broke the local of the International Longshoremen's Association that previously represented the longshoremen.

Agitators from the Communist Party of Canada were elected to the union executive in 1933, linking it to the Workers' Unity League and thus transforming it into a militant union. The VDWWA was itself broken in 1935 after another waterfront strike in Vancouver.

== See also ==
- Battle of Ballantyne Pier
- International Longshore and Warehouse Union
- William Wasbrough Foster
- Gerry McGeer
