= Timeline of Canadian history =

This is a brief timeline of the history of Canada, comprising important social, economic, political, military, legal, and territorial changes and events in Canada and its predecessor states.

== Prehistory ==
Year	Date	Event	Ref.
to 14,000 BCE		At some unknown time prior to this date, Paleo-Indians moved across the Beringia land bridge from eastern Siberia into northwest North America, settling in some areas of Alaska and the Yukon, but are blocked from further travel south into the continent by extensive glaciation.	
14,000 BCE		Glaciers that covered Canada began melting, allowing Paleo-Indians to move south and east into Canada and beyond.	
3,000–2,000 BCE		The Indigenous peoples of the Northeastern Woodlands begin to cultivate different types of squash.	
3,000 BCE		Paleo-Eskimos begin to settle the Arctic regions of North America from Siberia.	

== 8th century ==
Year	Date	Event	Ref.
796		Council of Three Fires (also known as the Three Fires Confederacy) was formed.	

== 10th century ==
Year	Date	Event	Ref.
1000		A short-lived Norse settlement is founded at L'Anse aux Meadows on the northern tip of Newfoundland. It is possibly connected with the attempted colony of Vinland, established by Leif Erikson around the same period or, more broadly, with Norse colonization of North America.	

== 12th century ==
Year	Date	Event	Ref.
1142	31 August	The Iroquois Confederacy (also known as the League of Peace and Power) is formed.	

== 15th century ==
Year	Date	Event	Ref.
1497	24 June	Genoese navigator John Cabot lands the Matthew of Bristol somewhere on the northern Atlantic coast of North America, claiming the land for England by the Doctrine of discovery. The precise location of Cabot's landing is widely debated but generally believed to be on Newfoundland, already inhabited by the Beothuk people.	
1498-99		Portuguese explorer João Fernandes Lavrador first sights and sails along the coasts of the Labrador Peninsula.	

== 16th century ==
Year	Date	Event	Ref.
1534	24 July	Explorer Jacques Cartier claims the Gaspé Peninsula, already inhabited by Indigenous St. Lawrence Iroquoians, for France under the Doctrine of Discovery. He returns to France with two Iroquois captives.	
1583		Explorer Humphrey Gilbert lands in present-day St. John's and lays claim to the island of Newfoundland for the Kingdom of England under the Doctrine of Discovery. He dies at sea and permanent settlement by the British had to await better planned attempts.	

== 17th century ==
Year	Date	Event	Ref.
1605		French colonists under Samuel de Champlain establish the first permanent European settlement in the future Canada at Port-Royal, founding the colony that would become known as Acadia.	
1608	3 July	Quebec City founded by Champlain, becoming the capital of New France.	
1634	4 July	Trois-Rivières founded, becoming the second permanent settlement in New France.	
1642	17 May	Fort Ville-Marie (Old Montreal) founded with the majority of immigrants coming directly from France led by Paul de Chomedey and Jeanne Mance, a lay woman.	
1666		First census of New France released.	
1670	2 May	Hudson's Bay Company formed. It has an exclusive charter for trade in the Hudson Bay watershed region known as Rupert's Land. The company administers the new colony on behalf of the King.	
1688	April	While attempting to enforce English territorial claims, New England Governor Edmund Andros plundered Baron Jean-Vincent d'Abbadie de Saint-Castin's manor home and village on Penobscot Bay in French Acadia (now in the United States in Castine, Maine). This action opened the North American theater of the Nine Years' War.	
1690	16–24 October	The Battle of Québec was fought between the colonies of New France and Massachusetts Bay, then ruled by the kingdoms of France and England, respectively. It was the first time Québec's defenses were tested, with the New Englanders hoping to seize Québec, then the capital of New France. They failed to take the city.	
1691	7 October	Nova Scotia incorporated into the Province of Massachusetts Bay by royal charter. Returned to France under terms of the Treaty of Ryswick in 1697.	

== 18th century ==
Year	Date	Event	Ref.
1701	4 August	The Great Peace of Montreal, between New France and 39 First Nations, is finalized.	
1710	October	In the Siege of Port Royal, the capital of Acadia falls to the British, defeating the French garrison and their Wabanaki Confederacy Indigenous allies. This begins an expansion into present-day Nova Scotia by the British.	
1713	11 April	The War of the Spanish Succession is ended by the Treaty of Utrecht. France cedes the territory of Acadia to Great Britain and renounces claims to some British territories in Canada, as well as its claim to a monopoly of trade with the Indigenous population, but retains control of Île Royale colony (present-day Cape Breton Island and Prince Edward Island).	
1717		The Indigenous settlement of Kanesatake is founded at the confluence of the St. Lawrence and Ottawa rivers. It is founded by the Sulpician Order under a royal charter as a home for Catholic converts of the Indigenous peoples of the region, including the Mohawk. The lands' ownership becomes disputed between the Order and the Indigenous residents over the original land grant and title. The settlement would later be the location of the Oka Crisis. The land remains disputed.	
1749	21 June	Halifax is founded and settled by the British, marking the first time that public rather than private capital was used to settle a British colony in the Americas. The Indigenous Mi'kmaq consider Britain's unilateral action as a violation of treaties signed after Father Rale's War in 1726, starting Father Le Loutre's War. British colonists would drive French and Mi'kmaq inhabitants from peninsular Nova Scotia but are repelled from Acadian settlements further north (present-day New Brunswick).	
1755	11 August	British Brigadier-General Charles Lawrence orders the Expulsion of the Acadians. Over the next decade an estimated 11,400 French Catholics are deported to the Thirteen Colonies and Europe. Many settle in Louisiana.	
1758	8 June – 26 July	The French naval fortress at Louisbourg is sieged for a second time by the British, having been returned to the French after a previous occupation in 1745. After being used to stage attacks on French Canada the following year, British soldiers reduce the fortress to rubble to prevent its return to the French a second time.	
1759	13 September	A three-month British siege of Quebec City culminates in the pivotal Battle of the Plains of Abraham just outside the city's walls. Both the British commander and the French commander are killed in the battle. The British army secures a decisive victory, and French forces leave the city.	
1760–1761	10 March 1760 – 12 October 1761	The Halifax Treaties are signed between the Wabanaki Confederacy and the British Crown to end warring between the Indigenous peoples of the Maritimes and the British. One by one, various First Nations signed treaties to pledge "peace and friendship" with the British. The issue of aboriginal title is not covered in the treaties.	
1763	10 February	The Seven Years' War is ended by the Treaty of Paris. France cedes New France to Great Britain, its colony Canada becoming the British Province of Quebec, and its remaining maritime colonies annexed by Nova Scotia.	
1763	7 October	The Royal Proclamation of 1763 is issued by King George III, forbidding settlement west of the Appalachian Mountains, which was delineated as an Indian Reserve. The document is the first to recognize aboriginal title, a right included in the Canadian Constitution. Its banning of settlements west of the 13 British Colonies would eventually become one of the factors inciting the American Revolution.	
1764	1 August	The Treaty of Fort Niagara is agreed to by the British Crown and 24 First Nations. It is the first treaty after the 1763 Proclamation, recognizing aboriginal title, and Indigenous recognition of the Proclamation. A strip of land along the Niagara River is transferred to Britain by the Seneca to provide a portage around Niagara Falls. The treaty created a new Covenant Chain, or friendship treaty, between Britain and the First Nations of the western Great Lakes. It is recorded in wampum. To the Indigenous peoples, it is a symbol of friendship and the recognition of sovereignty to their First Nations.	
1769	14 July	St. John's Island is partitioned from Nova Scotia, becoming a separate colony from the mainland. The colony is renamed Prince Edward Island in 1798.	
1774		Quebec Act of 1774 is passed by the Parliament of Great Britain outlining how the Province of Quebec would be governed as colony, in an attempt to address damage to the economy/society of Quebec. Old boundaries were restored, free practice of Catholicism was guaranteed, and property and civil laws were to be decided according to traditional Canadian laws (thus preserving the Seigneurial system of New France for land ownership), with other matters of law left to English Common Law. The province was left to be governed by a legislative council, with no provision for an elected assembly.	
1775-1776		The Invasion of Quebec and the Battle of Quebec take place, during the American Revolutionary War against Great Britain. These became a failed attempt at seizing military control of the British Province of Quebec and convince the French-speaking Canadiens to join the revolution on the side of the Thirteen Colonies.	
1780s-1860s		An Underground railroad, a series of houses where aid and shelter was available, assisted escaped slaves from slave states to the northern U.S. and for some the journey continued into Canada. Slavery was outlawed in Canada with the passage of the British Slavery Abolition Act 1833. That made entry into Canada even more attractive to escaped slaves, and an estimated 30,00 to 40,000 blacks came to Canada along the Underground Railroad before the end of slavery in the United States in 1865.	
1782-1783		A preliminary peace treaty between Great Britain and the United States of America is signed. Citing one of the clauses, General George Washington insisted on the return of any present or former slaves. As part of documenting and evacuation of former slaves to British North America, the Book of Negroes was compiled in New York City. Enslaved Africans in America who escaped to the British during the American Revolutionary War became the first settlement of Black Nova Scotians and Black Canadians.	
1783		The United States conducts the Expulsion of the Loyalists after the American Revolutionary War. Around 45,000 people flee to Canada, mostly Nova Scotia and Upper Canada. This group becomes known as the United Empire Loyalists.	
1780s-1860s		An Underground railroad, a series of houses where aid and shelter was available, assisted escaped slaves from slave states to the northern U.S. and for some the journey continued into Canada. Slavery was outlawed in Canada with the passage of the British Slavery Abolition Act 1833. That made entry into Canada even more attractive to escaped slaves, and an estimated 30,00 to 40,000 blacks came to Canada along the Underground Railroad before the end of slavery in the United States in 1865.	
1783	3 September	The Treaty of Paris (1783) was signed by representatives of King George III of Great Britain and representatives of the United States of America, officially ending the American Revolutionary War. The treaty set the boundaries between the British Empire in North America and the United States of America. Details included fishing rights and restoration of property and prisoners of war.	
1784	22 May	Over 3,000,000 acres (1,200,000 ha) of land is purchased by the British Crown from the Mississaugas of the Credit First Nation in present-day Ontario for £1,180.	
1784	18 June	New Brunswick and Cape Breton Island are partitioned from Nova Scotia, becoming separate colonies. Cape Breton re-joins Nova Scotia in 1820.	
1784	25 October	Under the terms of the Haldimand Proclamation, 550,000 acres (220,000 ha) of the lands purchased from the Mississaugas is granted to the Mohawks and the other Five Nations of the Haudenosaunee Confederacy. The land is a tract extending 6 miles (9.7 km) on either side of the Grand River from source to mouth. However, it is later determined that the head of the Grand River was outside of the lands purchased from the Mississaugas. In 1792, Governor Simcoe unilaterally reduces the land grant to 270,000 acres (110,000 ha). Later land sales, government actions, and the creation of the Six Nations of the Grand River reserve would reduce the lands under Indigenous possession to a small fraction of the original grant. The land grant and its management is the basis of the Grand River land dispute between the Six Nations and Canada.	
1790s		Hudson's Bay Company and North West Company build fur trading posts on upper Saskatchewan River. These include Fort Edmonton and forts at Rocky Mountain House.	
1791	10 June	The Constitutional Act 1791 divides the Province of Quebec into Upper and Lower Canada (modern-day Ontario and Quebec). Elections held in 1792 in those two colonies.	
1793		Alexander Mackenzie arrives at Bella Coola on the west coast, being the first person known to cross the North American continent.	

== 19th century ==
Year	Date	Event	Ref.
1805	1 August	The treaty of the Toronto Purchase is made for the lands of present-day Toronto north to Lake Simcoe between the Crown and the Mississauga. It was found that the original 1787 agreement only provided a land deed and no description of the lands involved. The treaty would be disputed and settled in 2010.	
1811		Settlement began of the Red River Colony. 300,000 square kilometres (120,000 sq mi) in size; 5 times that of Scotland. Founded by Thomas Douglas, 5th Earl of Selkirk via a land grant from the Hudson's Bay Company, of which he was part-owner. The territory later became part of Manitoba and the Missouri Territory, with the location of colony's main centre becoming the site of Winnipeg.	
1812-1821		Pemmican War, the last outburst of long-standing friction between the HBC and rival fur trading companies. The Red River Colony was the scene of a series of violent encounters, blockades, sieges, attacks and kidnappings. The war includes the NWC capture and partial destruction of Fort Douglas and Fort Gibraltar and the Battle of Seven Oaks in 1816.	
1813	27 April	Battle of York. A U.S. military force attacks the garrison at York, Upper Canada, the capital of Upper Canada. The British and Canadian defenders are defeated. As they retreat, they blow up their magazine and kill hundreds of U.S. soldiers. Surviving U.S. soldiers retaliate by looting and burning down the town.	
1813	21–22 June	During the War of 1812, Laura Secord overhears U.S. officers planning a surprise attack on a British force and walks 30 km (20 miles) to warn them. The British force successfully repels the U.S. invaders at the Battle of Beaver Dams on 24 June. War ends with Canada still independent from the U.S.	
1818	20 October	The London Convention is signed. It sets the boundary between British North America and the U.S., running at the 49th parallel from the Northwest Angle in Minnesota, east of Manitoba, west to the continental divide of the Rocky Mountains, and establishing joint control of the Oregon Country.	
1821		Merger of Hudson's Bay Company and the North West Company ending the Pemmican War of 1812–1821. As part of the merger, the monopoly of HBC is extended north to the Arctic Ocean and west to the Pacific Ocean.	
1823–1825		Robert Wilmot-Horton secures two parliamentary grants to fund an experiment where poor Irish families settled in Canada. The plans are dropped after Wilmot-Horton leaves the Colonial Office in 1827.	
1829	6 June	Shanawdithit, the last known full-blooded member of the Beothuks of Newfoundland, dies at the age of 29.	
1837		Rebellions of 1837–1838 break out in both Upper and Lower Canada, inspired by republican ideals, against the domination by the Château Clique and the Family Compact, corruption-riddled combinations of large business interests and public officials. The rebellions are led by William Lyon Mackenzie and Louis Joseph Papineau. Some of the captured are hanged; a hundred captured Canadian rebels and U.S. sympathizers are sentenced to life in Australian prison colonies. The rebellions inspire the Durham Report and subsequent reforms.	
1837-1838		Patriot War. Members of the Hunters' Lodges make armed incursions into the Canadas. The incursions are met by British regulars and Canadian militia units. Almost a hundred U.S. invaders and 58 Patriot fighters from Lower Canada are transported to Australian prison colonies.	
1841	10 February	Under the terms of the Act of Union 1840, the British colonies of Lower Canada and Upper Canada are merged into the single Province of Canada. Representation by population, to give fairness between former Upper and Lower Canada, is enshrined.	
1846	15 June	The Oregon boundary dispute is settled with the signing of the Oregon Treaty, extending the boundary between British North America and the United States along the 49th parallel from the Rocky Mountains to the Juan de Fuca Strait, and defining the maritime boundary to the Pacific Ocean.	
1850	7 September, 9 September	The Robinson Treaties are signed between Ojibwa leaders and the British Crown, surrendering the northern shores of Lake Superior and Lake Huron for £2,160 and an annual payment of £600.	
1860s		The outbreak of the U.S. Civil War caused issues in Canada. The fear of the large armies encouraged moves towards Confederation as a defence strategy; the activities of Confederate spies in Canada and other issues caused problems with the U.S. government. The end of slavery in the United States in 1865 ended the operation of the Underground Railroad, which had helped 30,00 to 40,000 blacks escape to freedom in Canada.	
1862	18 March	1862 Pacific Northwest smallpox epidemic starts with the first reported case of smallpox in Victoria, BC. Smallpox spreads amongst Indigenous populations, and kills an estimated 20,000, two-thirds of the Indigenous population.	
1864	1 – 9 September	The Charlottetown Conference, the first of several meetings to discuss a Maritime Union and Canadian Confederation, is held in Charlottetown.	
1864	1 – June 29	The Beloeil train disaster - a Grand Trunk Railway train carrying hundreds of recently arrived immigrants from Montreal to Quebec City did not stop at an opened swing bridge over the Richelieu River, at the present-day town of Beloeil, Quebec. 99 killed and more than 100 injured. The worst railway accident in Canadian history.	
1866-1871		Fenian raids into New Brunswick, Quebec, Ontario, and Manitoba caused more than a hundred Canadian deaths.	
1867	1 July	Confederation—The British North America Act, 1867, divides the Province of Canada into Ontario and Quebec and joins them with New Brunswick and Nova Scotia into the new confederated state of Canada.	
1869–1870	11 October – 12 May	A group of Métis led by Louis Riel mount the Red River Rebellion against Canadian intrusion in the Red River Colony. The Canadian government regains control after a military expedition and accedes to many of Riel's demands. He flees into exile in the United States after the government refuses to grant him amnesty and a bounty is offered for his capture.	
1870	15 July	Main article: Timeline of Rupert's Land and North-Western Territory transfer Canada acquires Rupert's Land and the North-Western Territory, concluding a series of agreements between Canada, the United Kingdom, and the Hudson's Bay Company. This forms the North-West Territories. In the aftermath of the Red River Rebellion, the area around Winnipeg, in Manitoba, is detached from the new territory and becomes Canada's fifth province. Land rights are granted to Red River Métis.	
1871	20 July	The colonies of British Columbia and Vancouver Island amalgamate and then enter Confederation as the province of British Columbia, Canada's sixth province. Except for individual treaties for small portions of the territory, the agreement annexes a large area of land into Canada without treaties with the First Nations.	
1871	3 August	Treaty 1 is signed between Chippewa and Swampy Cree First Nations and the Crown, surrendering lands in Manitoba in exchange for treaty obligations of the Canadian government.	
1871	21 August	Treaty 2 is signed between Chippewa Cree First Nation and the Crown, surrendering lands in Manitoba and Saskatchewan in exchange for treaty obligations of the Canadian government.	
1873	23 May	The North-West Mounted Police is established to enforce Canadian sovereignty in the North-West Territories and to stamp out the whisky trade. In 1874, the Force accomplished Great March West westward to southern Alberta and to Fort Edmonton. (Later became the Royal North-West Mounted Police, then the Royal Canadian Mounted Police)	
1873	1 July	Prince Edward Island enters Confederation as the seventh province.	
1873	3 October	Treaty 3 is signed between Ojibwe First Nations and the Canadian Crown, surrendering lands in Northwestern Ontario (present-day) and Manitoba.	
1874	15 September	Treaty 4 is signed between many Cree First Nations and the Crown of Canada, surrendering lands in present-day Saskatchewan, Alberta and Manitoba in exchange for treaty obligations agreed to by Canada.	
1875	20 September	Treaty 5 is signed between Saulteaux and Swampy Cree First Nations and the Canadian Crown, surrendering lands in Manitoba, Saskatchewan and Ontario, in exchange for treaty obligations agreed to by Canada.	
1876	12 April	The Indian Act is passed. The Act updates previous legislation of the Province of Canada addressing the relationship between the Government of Canada and officially recognized First Nations. It establishes official definitions of "Indian status" and defines Indigenous government.	
1876	23, 28 August; 9 September	Treaty 6 is signed between Plains and Wood Cree First Nations and the Canadian Crown, surrendering lands in present-day Alberta and Saskatchewan in exchange for treaty obligations agreed to by Canada.	
1877	22 September	Treaty 7 is signed by Nakoda and Blackfoot First Nations and the Canadian Crown, surrendering lands in southern present-day Alberta in exchange for treaty obligations agreed to by Canada.	
1880	1 September	The British Arctic Territories are ceded to Canada, becoming part of the North-West Territories.	
1885	26 March – 3 June	Several hundred Catholic Francophone Métis led by Louis Riel and supported by Cree fighters mount the North-West Rebellion. They establish the Provisional Government of Saskatchewan. Riel is captured after the Battle of Batoche (9–12 May), tried for treason, and hanged on 16 November 1885. Many Francophones denounce the sentence, and Canada is split along ethno-religious lines. Six First Nations convicted murderers also hanged in 1885, the largest mass-hanging in Canadian history.	
1885	7 November	The transcontinental Canadian Pacific Railway (CPR), then the longest in the world, is completed.	
1889		The Peasant Farm Policy is brought into force. The Policy restricted Indigenous farmers agricultural practices. Indigenous farmers are allowed only to use hand tools, both in the seeding, harvesting and milling. Indigenous farmers were only allowed small plots and not sell produce in competition with settlers. It is discontinued in 1897.	
1890-1891		Calgary & Edmonton Railway built from the CPR station at Calgary to the Edmonton area, spawning the later City of Strathcona.	
1896	16 August	Gold is discovered in the Klondike region of the Yukon Territory, sparking the Klondike Gold Rush. Tens of thousands flood into the Klondike region in 1897 and 1898, through Edmonton and the northern Prairies, or through BC and Alaska seaports.	
1899	8 July	Treaty 8 is signed by Cree, Beaver, Chipewyan First Nations and the Canadian Crown, surrendering 840,000 square kilometres (320,000 sq mi) of lands in present-day British Columbia, Alberta and Saskatchewan, in exchange for treaty obligations agreed to by Canada.	

== 20th century ==
Year	Date	Event	Ref.
1903		The United Kingdom and the United States settle the Alaska boundary dispute on the border with British Columbia. Canadians are bitterly disappointed by British betrayal of Canadian interests in order to curry favour from Washington.	
1905	1 September	Alberta and Saskatchewan are partitioned out of the North-West Territories to become the eighth and ninth provinces of Canada.	
1905	6 November	Treaty 9 is signed by the Anishinaabe (Algonquin and Ojibway) and Omushkegowuk Cree communities and the Crown, surrendering land in Northern Ontario and Northwestern Quebec to James Bay.	
1906	28 August	Treaty 10 is signed between several First Nations, including the Cree and Chipewyan, and the Crown, surrendering 220,000 square kilometres (85,000 mi^{2}) in northern Saskatchewan and Alberta. Additional nations signed on later in 1906 and 1907.	
1909	23 February	The first powered heavier-than-air flight in Canada occurs on Bras d'Or Lake at Baddeck, Nova Scotia, when John Alexander Douglas McCurdy pilots the AEA Silver Dart over a flight of less than 1 kilometer.	
1910	4 May	Royal Canadian Navy is established.	
1913	November	The Great Lakes Storm of 1913 kills at least 250 in Ontario.	
1914	29 May	RMS Empress of Ireland and Norwegian collier SS Storstad collide in Saint Lawrence River in Quebec. At least 1012 die.	
1914	19 June	Hillcrest mine disaster, at Hillcrest, Alberta. At least 189 coalminers die.	
1914	4 August	Great Britain declares war on Germany, bringing Canada into the First World War. Seventy-three Canadians are awarded the Victoria Cross during WWI.	
1916	June 27	A German U-Boat torpedoes and sinks HMHS Llandovery Castle, a Canadian hospital ship, off coast of Ireland, killing at least 234 crew, medical officers and other ranks, and nursing sisters. Worst Canadian maritime disaster of WWI.	
1917	9–12 April	The four divisions of the Canadian Expeditionary Force fight together for the first time in the Battle of Vimy Ridge, which becomes celebrated as a national symbol of achievement and sacrifice and a formative milestone in the development of Canada's national identity.	
1917	6 December	Halifax Explosion—Accidental collision between two merchant ships, one filled with explosives for the war, occurs in Halifax Harbour. The subsequent explosion kills 2000 people and injures 9000.	
1918	1 April	Prohibition in Canada is enacted federally by an Order in Council.	
1918	24 May	Some women gain the right to vote in federal elections. Female suffrage is extended in later years, including to women with Treaty Indian status and women between ages of 18 and 21.	
1918	2 – 3 August	After years of press censorship along with numerous government policies suppressing strikes & lockouts. The 1918 Vancouver general strike, the first in Canadian history, takes place after prominent labour activist Albert "Ginger" Goodwin is shot by police. This sparks the beginning of the Canadian Labour Revolt.	
1918	2 August	The beginning of a series of labour movements collectively known as the "Canadian Labour Revolt" begin, lasting six years.	
1918	19 September	Canadian Air Force (after 1924, Royal Canadian Air Force) is established.	
1918-1920		Spanish flu takes about 50,000 Canadian lives.	
1919		Canada sends a delegation to the Paris Peace Talks, the conference resolving war issues. Canada signs the Versailles treaty as part of the British Empire, with parliament's approval.	
1919		Prohibition in Canada ends federally. It is partially renewed due to 1920 Canadian liquor plebiscites.	
1919	May 15 -June 26	The largest strike in Canadian history; the Winnipeg general strike occurs. Soldiers returning from WW1 & over 30,000 workers walk off their jobs; shutting down the majority of the city's privately owned factories, shops and trains. Public employees joined them in solidarity. These included police, firemen, postal workers, telephone and telegraph operators & utilities workers. Special constables were hired and laws were passed to immediately deport, without trial, anyone who was not born in Canada that was caught striking. events of this day led to the creation of the "One Big Union".	
1920	January	Canada is admitted as a full member of the League of Nations, independently of Britain. It joins the League Council (governing board) in 1927. Canada plays a minor role and opposes sanctions or military action by the League.	
1921	27 June until 22 August	Treaty 11, the last of the Numbered Treaties, is signed by the Slavey, Dogrib, Loucheux, Hare First Nations and the Canadian Crown. It covers a region within the Northwest Territories.	
1926	25 June – 14 September	A constitutional crisis, known as the King–Byng affair, is precipitated when Governor General Byng refused Prime Minister King's request to dissolve parliament and call an election, instead asking opposition leader Meighen to form a government, which in turn was quickly defeated. King framed the dispute as one of Britain, represented by the Governor General, interfering with Canadian affairs. Consequently, the affair played a role in the Balfour Declaration of 1926, in which each Dominion of the British Empire was declared to be of equal status with Britain.	
1927	25 November	Canada appoints Vincent Massey as its first fully accredited envoy to a foreign capital.	
1929		Great Depression in Canada begins, resulting in widespread poverty, unemployment, & violent labour protests for the next decade.	
1930	January	The Workers' Unity League (WUL) is created. The WUL paralleled similar alternative trade union structures elsewhere: the Trade Union Unity League in the US, and the National Minority Movement in the UK. Some of the unions affiliated with the WUL include the Mine Workers' Union of Canada, Lumber Workers Industrial Union of Canada and the Relief Camp Workers' Union. Unlike both the Trades and Labor Congress of Canada (TLC) and the All-Canadian Congress of Labour (ACCL), the WUL organized the unemployed as well.	
1931	7 – 29 September	Estevan riot is peak event of a confrontation between members of the Royal Canadian Mounted Police and striking coal miners from nearby Bienfait, Saskatchewan, The Mine Workers' Union of Canada in Bienfait, established by the national "Workers' Unity League" demands a wage increase, an end to the company store monopoly, better living conditions, and improved workplace safety. Miners assemble in Beinfait with their families to parade to Estevan in order to draw attention to their demands. As they walk from Beinfait to Estevan, they are met with lines of police officers who fire on the protesters, killing four.	
	11 December	The Statute of Westminster 1931 is enacted in Britain, officially ending the power of the British parliament to pass and nullify laws in a Dominion without the Dominion's request and consent. The statute formally recognized the de facto independence attained by Canada following the First World War.	
1933	September 15	The Stratford General Strike of 1933 begins with strikes in several local furniture-making factories that the Workers' Unity League had recently unionized, & Swift's Meat Packing Plant, a poultry company, who had unionized as the Food Workers' Industrial Union. At its height more than 2,000 strikers were involved. The army along with several Carden Loyd tankettes were sent to quell the violence. Controversy over the use of armoured military vehicles in a management-labour dispute resulted in victory for the strikers. One strike leader, Oliver Kerr, was elected mayor the following year.	
1935	April 4- July 1	Over 1000 workers under the guidance of Arthur "Slim" Evans join the Relief Camp Workers' Union and begin the On-to-Ottawa Trek in protest of the conditions & wages of then prime minister R. B. Bennett's Government relief work camps. After arriving in Regina, Saskatchewan, the trekkers agreed to send only 8 delegates to Ottawa to represent their cause, with the rest remaining at the Regina Exhibition grounds with support provided by private citizens & government of Regina. After discussion between the delegations and the government in Ottawa broke down, RCMP officers hidden in boxtrucks ambush the Trekkers. The police fire pistols and automatic guns into and above the group, killing two and wounding several hundred. Saskatchewan Premier James Garfield Gardiner accuses the RCMP of "precipitating a riot".	
	18 June	Battle of Ballantyne Pier, 1000 protesters, consisting of the Vancouver and District Waterfront Workers' Association, under influence of the Workers' Unity League; march towards Ballantyne Pier to prevent scabs from unloading ships in the harbour. Upon arriving at the pier they are ambushed by the Vancouver police, BC Provincial Police, and RCMP who had been hiding behind boxcars. Battle of Ballantyne Pier and other fights lead to the creation of the International Longshore and Warehouse Union.	
1938	19 June	Bloody Sunday is the conclusion of a month-long "sitdowners' strike" by The Relief Project Workers' Union (an extension of the Relief Camp Workers' Union) in Vancouver. 1,200 men split themselves between the post office, the Vancouver Art Gallery & The Georgia Hotel. At 5 o'clock on the morning of 19 June, City Police & RCMP enter the buildings and forcibly eject the men, causing a melee. Of the 42 hospitalized, only 5 are police and all of those are Vancouver police constables. Later that afternoon, 10,000 to 15,000 turn out to a protest at the Powell Street Grounds against the "police terror" of Bloody Sunday.	
1939	10 September	Canada, with its parliament's support, enters the Second World War by declaring war on Germany. The Dominion of Newfoundland had entered the war as a British colony upon the United Kingdom's declaration of war a week earlier.	
1939–1945		During World War II, the Canadian government mobilizes Canadian money, supplies, and volunteers to support Britain while boosting the economy and maintaining home front morale. Although suffering defeats at Dunkirk, Hong Kong and Dieppe, Canada plays a military role protecting convoys against German submarines, fighting the German Army in Italy, the Netherlands, France and Germany, helping to liberate the Netherlands from German occupation, and fighting against Japanese forces in the Pacific War. Canada Canada expands its small air force into what would be the world's fourth largest air force and expands its small navy into the world's third largest, after defeat of Italian, German and French forces. (Only the U.S. and U.K. has more ships at war's end.) The RCN has 363 ships (although few battleships and other capital ships) and 100,000 sailors (of whom 6700 were women). Sixteen Canadians are awarded the Victoria Cross during WWII.	
1942	27 April	National referendum on conscription sees a majority across country vote in favour. A majority in Quebec vote against. When government brings in forced service for Canadian males in 1944, it causes a political crisis.	
1945	9 November	Canada joins the United Nations, seeking to play a world role as a "middle power", with interest in the UN Charter and in relief agencies.	
1947	1 January	The Canadian Citizenship Act, 1946 comes into force creating a new, separate, Canadian legal citizenship for all British subjects born, raised, or resident in Canada and automatic citizenship for all those born in Canada after this date.	
1949	31 March	Newfoundland, the last British colony in North America, enters Confederation as the tenth province following a pair of contentious referendums on whether the island should remain a British Crown Colony, become fully independent, or join Canada.	
1957-1958		1957–1958 influenza pandemic takes about 3400 lives	
1959	27 June	The St. Lawrence Seaway, a joint project between Canada and the United States, is officially opened.	
1960	1 July	First Nations people are granted the right to vote in federal elections without having to give up their status and treaty rights.	
1965	15 February	Canada adopts the maple leaf for the national flag.	
1967	27 April	Expo 67 opens in Montreal.	
1970	5 October	The government invokes the War Measures Act to apprehend the Front de libération du Québec (FLQ), a separatist paramilitary group in Quebec that was responsible for over 160 violent incidents that killed 8 people and in October 1970 had kidnapped a British official (later released) and Quebec labour minister Pierre Laporte, who they killed. The FLQ collapses in 1971.	
1973	31 January	The Supreme Court of Canada rules in the Calder v British Columbia (AG) case that aboriginal title existed prior to the existence of the colonial government and was not a matter of Canadian law alone. The case recognized Nisga'a Nation aboriginal title. The ruling would lead the Government of Canada to update its land claims negotiation process.	
1973	15 November	The Quebec Superior Court blocks the James Bay Project by ruling that the Indigenous peoples of the region had not extinguished their aboriginal title to the lands and that Quebec and Canada must negotiate for such title in order to build the project. The final accord is signed 11 November 1975 by Canada, Quebec, Hydro-Quebec and the Cree of Quebec. The treaty becomes enshrined in the 1982 Canadian Constitution.	
1980	20 May	A referendum on Quebec independence is held, resulting in a majority (59.56%) of the province voting to remain in Canada.	
1981		Workers for British Columbia Telephone take over all of the province's telephone exchanges and run them for 5 days.	
1982	17 April	The enactment of the Constitution Act, 1982, by royal proclamation. Canada achieves total independence from Great Britain through Patriation of its Constitution. The Constitution includes the Canadian Charter of Rights and Freedoms, guaranteeing individual human rights. The Act also guarantees all treaty rights of Indigenous peoples in Canada. The Government of Quebec refuses to sign the deal and attempts to veto the Act; the Supreme Court of Canada rules that Quebec's assent is not required.	
1987	3 June	The Meech Lake Accord is signed by all ten provincial premiers and Prime Minister Brian Mulroney. The accord is intended to grant further powers to all provinces and grant distinct society status to Quebec, which had opposed the repatriation of the Canadian Constitution. The Accord is not ratified by all provincial parliaments within the required 3 years, heightening national unity tensions.	
1987	30 June	The loonie, the one-dollar coin, officially enters circulation. (The toonie (also spelled twonie or twoonie) comes into circulation on Feb. 19, 1996.)	
1989	1 January	The Canada–United States Free Trade Agreement comes into force. Under the agreement, the countries start to reduce or eliminate trade barriers between the two countries.	
1990	11 July – 26 September	The Oka Crisis occurs as Indigenous Mohawk activists protest the construction of a golf course on a burial ground, barricading roads and the Mercier Bridge. In August, after a series of violent standoffs between protesters and the Sûreté du Québec (SQ, Quebec's provincial police) which led to the death of one officer, Premier Robert Bourassa requests aid from the Canadian Armed Forces. In September, facing military invasion of their community, the protesters surrender and many leaders are arrested. Construction of the golf course is later cancelled.	
1992	28 August	The Charlottetown Accord, a second attempt to settle constitutional grievances, is agreed to by leaders of all provincial governments and the federal government and Indigenous groups. However, a 26 October national referendum on the accord sees a majority vote against the proposal.	
1994	1 January	The North American Free Trade Agreement comes into force, creating a free trade zone between Canada, Mexico and the United States, superseding the 1988 Canada-US Agreement.	
1995	18 August – 17 September	Indigenous Shuswap and non-Indigenous supporters exchange fire with Royal Canadian Mounted Police officers after a BC rancher attempts to evict them from land being used for a traditional ceremony, beginning the Gustafsen Lake standoff. After the largest and costliest paramilitary operation in the province's history, the Ts'peten Defenders surrender to police.	
1995	4 September	Members of an Indigenous Ojibwe band occupy Camp Ipperwash in southwestern Ontario, on land which had been expropriated from the band for a military base during World War II under the War Measures Act. The occupation sets off the Ipperwash Crisis. Two days later, an Ontario Provincial Police officer shoots and kills unarmed Ojibwe protester Dudley George. The land is transferred to the Ojibwe, but the ordinance on the site is not cleaned up, leaving the site only partially habitable.	
1995	30 October	The second referendum on Quebec independence is held. A majority (50.58%) of the province votes to remain in Canada.	
1997	11 December	The Supreme Court of Canada renders a decision onDelgamuukw v British Columbia, determining that aboriginal title had not been distinguished in BC. This ends the decades-long refusal of the BC government to participate in land claims to settle with First Nations, claiming that aboriginal title had been extinguished.	
1999	1 April	Nunavut is partitioned from the Northwest Territories to become Canada's third territory. This follows plebiscites in 1982 and 1992, and establishment of the Nunavut Land Claims Agreement in 1993.	

== 21st century ==
Year	Date	Event	Ref.
2001	7 October	Canada joins the War in Afghanistan.	
2003	7 December	The Canadian Alliance and PC Party merged into the Conservative Party of Canada.	
2005	20 July	The Civil Marriage Act legalizes same-sex marriage throughout Canada.	
2008	1 June	As part of the Indian Residential Schools Settlement Agreement, the Truth and Reconciliation Commission (TRC) is established to document the history and lasting impacts of the Canadian Indian residential school system on Indigenous persons and their families.	
2008	11 June	In the House of Commons, Prime Minister Harper formally apologizes to the survivors of the Residential School System on behalf of the Government of Canada.	
2010	3 June	The Haida Gwaii Reconciliation Act establishes in Canadian law the name of Haida Gwaii over the archipelago formerly known as the Queen Charlotte Islands. Further agreements would re-establish the sovereignty of over 200 islands to the Council of the Haida Nation.	
2012	13 February – September	Students in Quebec protest and stop proposed increases in university tuition.	
2012	4 May	The Royal Canadian Mint strikes the last Canadian penny. The coin is removed from circulation a few months later, though existing pennies remain legal tender.	
2014	12 March	Canada withdraws from the War in Afghanistan at the end of the first phase.	
2018	17 October	The Cannabis Act becomes law, making recreational cannabis use legal throughout the country. Canada is the second country (after Uruguay in 2013) to legalize recreational cannabis use nationwide.	
2020	7 January - March	Widespread popular protests occur across Canada after the RCMP forcibly remove peaceful protesters blocking construction of the Coastal GasLink pipeline on Wetʼsuwetʼen territory in British Columbia. The protests block several rail lines, forcing the shutdown of much of the Canadian rail network.	
2020	25 January	First presumptive case of COVID-19 is identified; a man who travelled in China. The COVID-19 pandemic spreads widely in Canada.	
2022	January - February	Right-wing protesters protesting vaccine mandates converge in Ottawa, overwhelming local police forces and disrupting residents in an occupation of downtown. After several weeks, the Canada convoy protest group is cleared after the Government of Canada invokes the Emergencies Act. Several police forces participate in a joint effort that forcibly removes the group. Similar groups block Canada-US border crossings in Windsor, Ontario and Coutts, Alberta for days before also being cleared forcibly by police. Criminal charges laid against several of the Coutts protesters.	
2022	24 February - ongoing	After the Russian invasion of Ukraine, Canada promises $1 billion in aid to Ukraine. Canada assists in training Ukrainian soldiers in third locations, and accepts thousands of Ukrainians fleeing the fighting.	
2022	24–29 July	Pope Francis visits Canada to apologize for Catholic Church members' role in the Canadian Indian residential school system. Services were held in Alberta, Quebec City and Iqaluit.	
2022	8 September	Elizabeth II, the longest-reigning Canadian monarch in history, dies aged 96, after a reign of 70 years. Charles III becomes King of Canada.	
2026	19 October	A referendum on Alberta remaining in Canada or proceeding toward a referendum on independence is held, resulting in a majority (75%) of the province voting to remain in Canada	

== See also ==
- List of Canadian historians
- Canadian studies

National historic significance

- Events of National Historic Significance
- National Historic Sites of Canada
- Persons of National Historic Significance

History by topic

History by province or territory
- Constitutional history of Canada
- Economic history of Canada
- History of Canadian newspapers
- History of Canadian sports
- History of cities in Canada
- History of education in Canada
- History of medicine in Canada
- History of rail transport in Canada
- Timeline of labour issues and events in Canada
- Social history of Canada
- Orange Order in Canada
- Anti-Quebec sentiment
- Acadian Renaissance

Academia

- Canadian Journal of History
- Canadian Historical Review
- Journal of Canadian Studies
- Heritage Minutes
- History Trek, Canadian History web portal designed for children
