= C38 =

C38 or C-38 may refer to:

== Vehicles ==
Aircraft

- Cessna C-38, an American civil utility aircraft
- Douglas C-38, an American military transport aircraft
- Gulfstream C-38A Courier, an American military transport aircraft

Ships

- HMS C38, a C-class submarine of the Royal Navy

Surface vehicles

- Alfa Romeo Racing C38, an Italian Formula One car
- Carlsson C38, a German performance car
- New South Wales C38 class locomotive, an Australian steam locomotive

== Other uses ==
- C-38 (cipher machine), an American mechanical cipher machine
- C-38 (Michigan county highway)
- C38 road (Namibia)
- Bill C-38, various legislation of the Parliament of Canada
- Caldwell 38, a spiral galaxy
- Heart cancer
- King's Gambit, a chess opening
- C-38 Canal, a straightened channel of the Kissimmee River
