= Farm Debt Review Act =

Canadian law

Parliament of Canada
- Long title: An Act to facilitate financial arrangements between farmers and their creditors
- Citation: SC 1986, c. 33
- Territorial extent: Canada
- Enacted by: Parliament of Canada
- Royal assent: 27 June 1986
- Commenced: 5 August 1986

Amends
- SC 1991, c. 46, s. 598; SC 1992, c. 1, Sch. VI, par. 10; SC 1994, c. 38, s. 25(1)
- Status: Repealed

The Farm Debt Review Act (French: Loi sur l'examen de l'endettement agricole) was an Act of the Parliament of Canada dealing with an agricultural recession affecting Canadian agriculture in the 1980s. It was in force from 1986 to 1998.

== Background ==
Farm credit increased significantly in the late 1970s as Canadian farmers expanded their operations to meet greater world demand with expectations of continuing high commodity prices for their production. In the early 1980s, prices collapsed, and annual interest rates suddenly rose from 10% to as high as 24%. Similar, but more severe, conditions had been previously encountered during the Great Depression of the 1930s. (Note: for which the Farmers' Creditors Arrangement Act was passed to deal with the situation)

In September 1985, a moratorium had been placed on all foreclosure actions by the Farm Credit Corporation. To provide debt relief on a nationwide basis, the Act was introduced in June 1986, and received Royal Assent later that month.

== Framework ==
=== Scope ===
The Act's scope was broad, as noted in its definitions:

- a "farmer" included any individual or entity engaged in farming
- "farming" included the production or raising of any animal or thing on a farm
- an "Insolvent farmer" meant any farmer who could not meet obligations as they came due, had ceased paying current obligations in the ordinary course of business as they came due, or whose property (valued either at fair market value or at a value obtained at a fairly conducted sale under legal process) is insufficient to enable payment of all obligations, due and accruing due
- farmers who were not insolvent, but were in financial difficulty, also came within certain provisions of the Act

Its aim was to "help farmers with the potential to be viable and remain in business." The significance of its framework was later described thus by one commentator:

The Act is significant in that it is based on creditors and applicant farmers coming to a voluntary arrangement.... The government has recognized that many insolvent farmers must leave the industry and that only commercially-viable farmers will be assisted by this Act. All applicants are provided with an opportunity to receive third-party expert advice on these financial affairs and relationships with their creditors.

=== Operation ===
The Act's operation was conducted in a decentralized manner:

- Farm Debt Review Boards were established for each province, or a region of a province, and each Board had power to appoint experts and establish review panels to help in their functions
- farmers in financial difficulty were able to have a review panel either review his financial affairs or assist him in facilitating an arrangement with his creditors
- insolvent farmers could apply to a Board for a review of his financial affairs and for a stay of proceedings against him by any of his creditors, following which a review panel would be appointed to facilitate an arrangement between the farmer and the creditors which would be administered by a licensed trustee
- insolvent farmers who had made an application would be barred from making another application during the following two years, unless written consent had been previously given by the Board
- secured creditors were required to give a notice of 15 business days before realizing upon the security, and the notice had to advise the farmer of his right to apply for a stay of proceedings
- the stay of proceedings was in effect for 30 days, and could be extended by the Board for a further three 30-day periods
- the Board had to appoint a guardian for the farmer's assets (which could be the farmer), and such guardian was subject to any directions given by the Board

== Impact ==
The Act protected hobby farmers as well as commercial farmers, and the stay of proceedings applied to all the farmer's assets, whether connected to the farm or not. (Note: An Ontario agency noted that the property of a farmer included "not only farm property, but any other property owned by a farmer, such as a house in the city or property of another business carried on by the farmer.") As well, a stay of proceedings under the Act voided any actions by a secured creditor, whether the stay was pleaded or not before a judge.

== Aftermath ==
The Act would be in effect until the coming into force of the Farm Debt Mediation Act in 1998.
