= 1933 Stratford, Ontario general strike =

Strike by furniture workers and chicken-pluckers in Ontario, Canada

The 1933 Stratford, Ontario general strike was a strike by 650 furniture workers and 100 food-processing workers in Stratford, Ontario, Canada. The strikes were led by workers from recently unionized factories in the Stratford area with the purpose of securing higher wages. Although the Canadian military was called to assist in quelling a strike, it ended peacefully, with workers getting higher wages and reduced working hours.

== Background and history ==
After the Great Depression workers' wages were below subsistence level, and they went on strike demanding that their wages be reviewed. The recently formed Workers' Unity League (WUL) organized unionization and the strike at various companies, as it had just done in Toronto. The individual actions began on September 15, 1933, with strikes in the six of the seven local furniture-making factories that the League had successfully unionized, and spread in subsequent days to the (mainly) women and men at Swift's Meat Packing Plant, a poultry company, who had unionized as the Food Workers' Industrial Union.

Initially the conflict was verbal. Employers denounced the WUL as a communist conspiracy, offered inducements for "loyal" workers who did not strike, and threatened to close the factory. This became a physical conflict when striking furniture workers tried to prevent employers from taking unfinished items, radio cabinets, out of the factory to have them worked on elsewhere. This worsened to mass looting and an all-day siege of local and provincial police at the Swift's strike. When the chicken-pluckers had walked out, 400 ducks and 11,000 live chickens were left in the factory, which the local Humane Society temporarily seized in order to feed them. The strikers and their supporters smashed railcars and trucks that were transporting butter, and released the chickens; whereupon onlookers rushed in to take and eat them. Eggs and butter were highly priced items at the time, as a result of World War One, at 20 cents per dozen for the former and 35 cents per pound for the latter.

In response to the incident at Swift's, the mayor of Stratford requested the support of the Canadian military, and soldiers arrived by train along with machine gun carriers. At its height there were more than 2,000 workers out on strike, including sympathy strikes, and the strikers' response to the calling in of the military was to organize a large rally and parade. The machine gun carriers, from Carden Loyd, were never employed in the end. The strike ended peacefully in November of the same year, with one of its local leaders, Oliver Kerr, actually elected as mayor of Stratford the next year. It was to be the last time that the Canadian military was called out to help with a strike.

The strikers, the chicken pluckers having been paid 2 cents per bird before the strike, were given a 10% pay raise and their work weeks were (variously in the different factories) limited to between 44 and 50 hours.

== Legacy ==
James Reaney, who had witnessed the strike firsthand as a seven-year-old child, turned it into a play, entitled King Whistle!, in 1979; and is recorded as jokingly claiming in a seminar that "the reason that Tom Patterson started the Stratford Festival" was "to get rid of the shame". The strike was one of several factors, including the rumours of the onset of what was to be World War Two and the end of the steam railway era causing a decline in the town's fortunes, that caused a sense of gloom in Stratford over the next couple of decades that Patterson sought to dispel.

The popular public perception that "baby tanks" had been used was a contributory factor in George Stewart Henry losing the 1934 Ontario general election to Mitchell Hepburn. The four machine gun carriers that arrived with the two companies of the Royal Canadian Regiment were promptly and widely mis-reported in the press as "baby tanks". The contemporary play Eight Men Speak reflects this perception with the dialogue "In Stratford ... troops and tanks were called in to terrorize the strikers and crush their struggle." in Act 4, and accounts of events even half a century later continued this popular description, such as Adelaide Leitch's Floodtides of Fortune account in 1980 saying "Four baby tanks, each with two men and armed with machine guns [...]". The "baby tanks" were not in fact tanks at all, but Carden Loyd tankettes, machine gun carriers with continuous tracks, that the Regiment had only recently acquired. G.S. Henry himself stated:

No tanks were sent to Stratford. Four Carden Loyd machine gun carriers automatically accompanied Headquarters and "C" Company to Stratford. These are part of the equipment, they being the modern method of transporting the machine guns belonging to this unit.

— Answer from the Prime Minister in the Ontario Legislative Assembly on 1934-03-02

Having used the Stratford strike as a political weapon against Henry and the Tories, Hepburn himself would go on to use similar tactics in the General Motors strike in Oshawa in 1937, where he first sent in 100 Royal Canadian Mounted Police officers and a squad of the Ontario Provincial Police, and then (the police having been sent away) swore in as special constables 400 veterans and university students, immediately dubbed "Hepburn's Hussars".
