= Bill C-38 =

Bill C-38 is the name of various legislation introduced into the House of Commons of Canada, including:

- Farm Debt Mediation Act, introduced in 1997 to the second session of the 35th Parliament
- Civil Marriage Act, introduced in 2005 to the only session of the 38th Parliament
- Jobs, Growth and Long-term Prosperity Act, introduced in 2012 to the first session of the 41st Parliament
