= Estevan riot =

1931 event in Saskatchewan, Canada

Estevan Riot
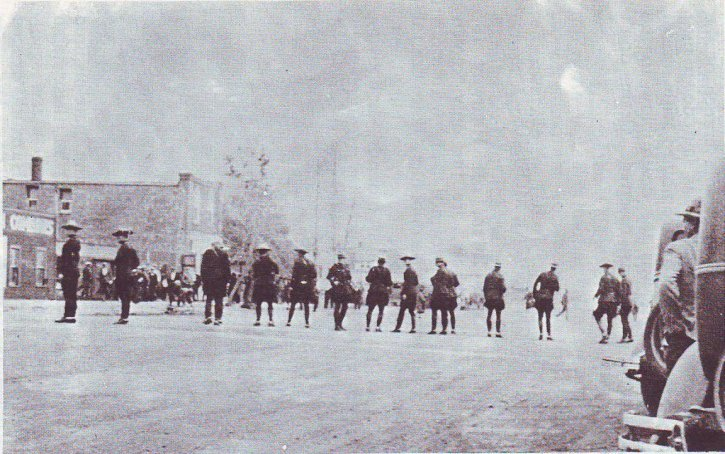
- RCMP officers during the Estevan Riot
- Date: September 29, 1931
- Location: Estevan, Saskatchewan, Canada
- Caused by: Labour unrest from coal miners
- Goals: Improved wages and working conditions
- Methods: Protest march

Parties
Workers Unity League	Royal Canadian Mounted Police

Casualties
- Deaths: 4
- Arrested: 14 (13 strikers and a union leader)

The Estevan riot, also known as the Black Tuesday Riot, occurred when members of the Royal Canadian Mounted Police attacked striking coal miners from nearby Bienfait, Saskatchewan, on September 29, 1931. The miners had been on strike since September 7, 1931, hoping to improve their wages and working conditions.

== Background ==
The region's mining work was seasonal; during the rest of the year, between April and August, miners would work in the fields to supplement wages before they returned to the mines. However, the droughts in the prairies and the overall economic situation in Canada made that impossible. That led to an increasing number of men looking for work in the mines, which let mining companies to choose their workers.

Furthermore, according to the Royal Commission that investigated the strike, Saskatchewan miners made half as much as their counterparts in Alberta and in British Columbia. Most of the miners and their families lived within company housing. Annie Barylik, the sixteen-year-old daughter of a miner at Bienfait Mines, described the conditions:

One bedroom, two beds in there, dining room, no beds in there, kitchen, one bed, and eleven in the family.... I think we need a bigger place than that. When it is raining the rain comes in the kitchen. There is only one ply of paper, cardboard paper nailed to about two-inch wood board.... It is all coming down and cracked... When the weather is frosty, when you wake up in the morning you cannot walk on the floor because it is all full of snow, right around the room.

The miners were represented at the bargaining table by the local branch of the Mine Workers' Union of Canada (MWUC), which had been organized by the Communist Party of Canada's trade union umbrella, the Workers' Unity League.

== Strike and riot ==
The local branch of the Mine Workers' Union of Canada in Bienfait demanded a wage increase, an end to the company store monopoly, better living conditions, and improved workplace safety. The mining company refused to recognize the union as legitimate and refused their demands.

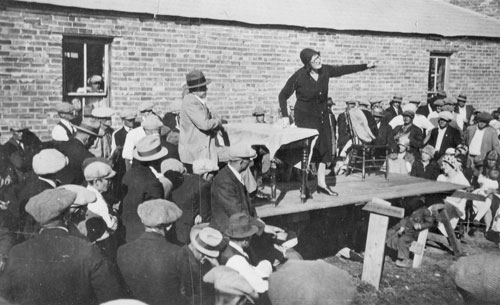
Annie Buller addressing a crowd before the Estevan Riot

On 7 September 1931, Bienfait coal miners voted to go on strike. Annie Buller, working with the Workers' Unity League, spoke in nearby Estevan in support of the striking workers.

On 29 September miners assembled in Estevan with their families to parade through the city in order to draw attention to their strike. As they walked from Beinfait to Estevan, they were met with lines of police officers. Upon entering the town square, the RCMP confronted the miners and attempted to block and break up the procession. Police violence broke out, and the RCMP opened fire on the strikers and killed four people and injured numerous others. Among those killed were miners Peter Markunas, Nick Nargan, Julian Gryshko and Mike Kyatick.

The following morning, 90 RCMP officers raided the miners' homes. 13 strikers and union leader were arrested on charges of rioting. Annie Buller was sentenced to one year of hard labour, to be completed at the Battleford Jail, and a $500 fine. The RCMP officers involved with the killing of the miners were not charged.

On 6 October, the mining company conceded to key demands including a $4 minimum wage, an eight-hour working day, reduced rent, and an end to the company store monopoly.

== Resolution ==
After a meeting with Royal Commission Counsel, members of both parties signed the following agreement:

We, the mine operators and employees in conference at the court-house Estevan, this sixth day of October, 1931, hereby agree that the mines be opened immediately and the men return to work on following conditions, viz.:

(1) That this be considered a temporary arrangement pending the findings of the Wylie Royal Commission and the possible drafting of a working agreement between the operators and the men.

(2) That committees of employees for each mine be a recognized organization in each mine.

(3) That the provisions of the Mines Act be observed in relation to check-weighers.

(4) That all water in the roadways and working face be removed by the company and that such places be kept as dry as possible.

(5) That the terms of any schedule or agreement finally reached between the operators and the men be made retroactive to the date of re-commencement of work by them.

(6) That there shall be no victimization or discrimination against men on account of the strike, particularly in reference to men on the payrolls as at September 7 last.

(7) That contract men be employed on an eight-hour basis, face to face, and the company men work nine hours a day.

(8) That because of working conditions in the various mines. the removal of slack and questions of overweight be left to negotiations between the operators and the committees of employees.

== Legacy ==
The event is still controversial in Estevan. The three striking miners killed have the inscription "murdered by RCMP" on their headstone, and locals still alternately erase and restore those words. The Saskatchewan Federation of Labour has created a plaque to memorialize the strikers.

The 1931 strike and ensuing riot were recognized by Parks Canada in June 2026 with a designation of national historical significance through the National Program of Historical Commemoration.

== Popular culture ==
The riot was depicted in the controversial movie Prairie Giant: the Tommy Douglas Story in which Tommy Douglas is falsely portrayed to be present. Also, James Garfield Gardiner is portrayed as then being premier of Saskatchewan, but it was really James Thomas Milton Anderson.

The riot was depicted by James Keelaghan in the title track of his 1990 album Small Rebellions.

== See also ==
- List of incidents of civil unrest in Canada
- Regina Riot
- Great Depression in Canada
- Workers' Unity League
- Scandals surrounding the RCMP
- James T.M. Anderson
- Annie Buller
- History of Saskatchewan
