= Mine Workers' Union of Canada =

- Founded: June 1, 1925
- Dissolved: August 22, 1935
- Headquarters: Canada
- Location: Canada
- Members: 4000
- Key people: Frank Leary Frank Wheatley James Sloan
- Affiliations: Workers' Unity League

The Mine Workers' Union of Canada (MWUC) was a trade union in the mining sector in Canada. It was founded on June 1, 1925, with assistance from the Communist Party of Canada, and it was dissolved on August 22, 1935. During its operation it was affiliated with the Worker's Unity League. The union at its peak had 4000 members and participated in 40 strikes. It mainly operated in Alberta and northern British Columbia.

== Founding ==
the MWUC was formed out of District 18 of the United Mine Workers of America (UMWA) which covered all of Alberta and the Crowsnest Pass in British Columbia. Tensions between the district and the international union were especially present in the decade before the split happened due to the actions of the UMWA and their handling of strikes. Members of distinct 18 accused the union leadership of caring more for the industry over its union members, they also called the union a company union.

During 1919 the workers in the Crowsnest Pass was fought over by two unions, the UMWA under the new leadership of John L. Lewis was moving towards corporate harmony and complete nonacceptance of communists among its membership. The One Big Union (Canada) (OBU) was endorsed by the more radical workforce in District 18 and they organized many local strikes demanding recognition of the OBU and the ability to join it. These strikes resulted in the district that stayed with the UMWA receiving a pay increase and the members that continued to protest being entered onto a union blacklist.

In 1922 the price of coal had dropped, as had the cost of living in the district, this caused the mine operators to petition the union for a purposed 50% wage decrease. UMWA refused this decrease and organized a strike which proved successful after 5 months. This strike still caused tension between the district and the union as the district only received $1,250 as a strike fund for the five months of strike.

The contracts between the UMWA and the mine owners ended and needed to be renegotiated in October 1924, the owners demanded a wage decrease and the UMWA did not contest this. Many UMWA members petitonted for a strike and district wide action but none happened. Some local mines did strike, but this resulted in the mines being opened under new non-union workforce. In December 1924 the owners of the Crows' Nest Pass Coal Company which operated the mines in Michel, and Fernie, British Columbia, shut down its mines and would only reopen them if the workers took an additional 30% pay cut. the Crows' Nest Pass Coal Company was also the largest mining company in the region, the union members petitioned for a district wide strike but the UMWA did not mobilize or support the miners in this goal which made the miners give in to the reduced rates by January 1925. These rates were then expanded to the entire region by April 1925.

The contract between the district and the UMWA expired in May 1925, many mines sought to leave immediately the first was Nordeggon May 8. Some of these communities came together on June 1, 1925, to form the Mine Workers' Union of Canada and electing Frank Leary as the first president. The MWUC was made to be a place for all political sides with no blacklists of communists or radicals, many of the central members were associated with the Communist Party of Canada and would be central to its actions. By September 1926 the MWUC was the largest miners' union in Alberta with around 4,000 members in fifteen camps.

MWUC was one of the founders of the All-Canadian Congress of Labour in 1927.

== Leadership ==
Upon its founding in 1925 the reformer Frank Leary was elected to become the president. He stated the following upon his victory "This organization is determined no U. M. W. of A. will be recognized in the pass under the present regime. The district officials failed us in a critical hour" John Stokaluk was chosen as the secretary of the MWUC at the same time. Learly was in power until 1926 when Frank Wheatly would successfully win the presidential office for himself, Leary did remain among the leadership of the union after his loss.

Wheatly was a head of the Alberta Federation of Labour. Wheatly oversaw many strikes during his time, he attempted to find a balance between the radical sections of the union and the industrialist running the mines. Wheatly did not achieve substantial gains for the union membership or widespread recognition of the MWUC. Wheatly would lose his seat in the aftermath of the Lethbridge riot, this riot was created from a union meeting after a failed strike vote where the communist section of the union including the next president James Sloan. Near the end of Wheatly's term he would reflect on his time stating "The mine workers on the job are reluctant to exert economic pressure which might have the effect of bringing about a shut down. Consequently conditions drift from bad to worse."

James Sloan was the third president of MWUC. L. Maurice was the vice president of the union.

== Labour mobilizations ==
One of the first actions of the MWUC was in Drumheller, Alberta. the event began before the union was founded in 1925 when the United Mine Workers of America imposed a 15% wage cut without consulting the miners. This caused the miners affiliated with the Communist Party of Canada to leave and upon the foundation of the MWUC they joined and attempted to negotiate with the mine owners. The MWUC was not allowed to negotiate so they formed a picket line in front of the mine and attempted to block access to the members of the UMWA. This escalated and became violent, it ended with one member of the MWUC being killed by the Alberta police and many other union members being arrested. This event caused the Communist Party of Canada to found the Canadian Labour Defence League as they needed to manage the legal cases of the imprisoned union members.

The Wayne field mines were another site of large action for the union. This disruption was caused when the mine owners made a change to the payment system which saw miners only being paid for coal that would fit through a 1.5 inch screen, instead of simply being paid for the unrefined coal as it was before. This system would mean that the coal would be refined by the miners and ready to sell to consumers immediately without need for additional staff. This would also be a pay cut for the miners as they would have to spend additional time refining the ore. The miners organized into local 17 and joined the MWUC to negotiate with the mine operators. the negotiations were successful with the union being able to secure an additional 4 cents per ton to account for the extra time spent on refining the ore, but the mine operators refused to recognize the MWUC as the union of the mines and the miners voted to go on strike starting August 16, 1928, demanding official recognition of the MWUC. The strikes lasted until February 1929 where the mine operators gave in to the demands and officially recognized the MWUC as the union of the mines.

== 1931 Bienfait-Estevan struggle ==
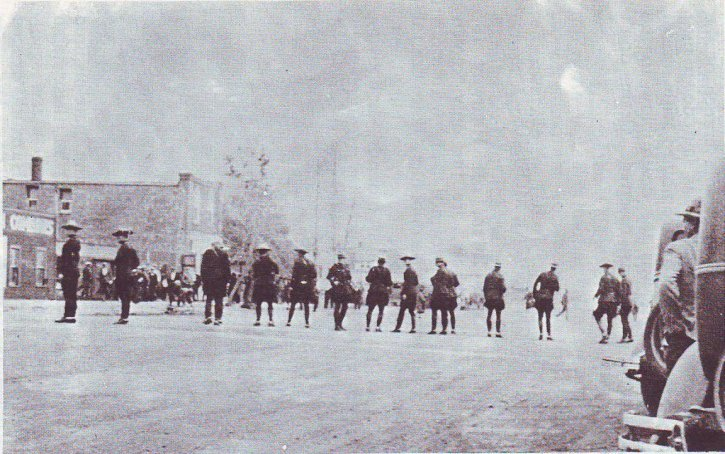
RCMP officers during the Estevan Riot

In the summer of 1931 MWUC was contacted by miners from Bienfait and Estevan in Saskatchewan. The Bienfait-Estevan miners lived in miserable conditions, but the Trades and Labour Congress of Canada had paid little attention to them. MWUC sent its organizers to Bienfait-Estevan. MWUC was able to mobilize a large majority of local miners, preparing for a strike. The mine owners rejected negotiations, and the mayor of Estevan prohibited manifestations by MWUC. When the MWUC took to the streets to protest, they were met with police fire. Three people were killed on September 29, 1931. Twelve miners were arrested in the aftermath. Following these events, MWUC lost its foothold in the area.

== Registration ==
MWUC was registered with the Canadian authorities on March 19, 1926. The registration was cancelled by the Department of Secretary of State on August 22, 1935.
