= Farmers' Creditors Arrangement Act =

1934 Act of the Parliament of Canada

Parliament of Canada
- Long title: An Act to facilitate Compromises and Arrangements between Farmers and their Creditors
- Citation: SC 1934, c. 53
- Territorial extent: Canada; Prairie Provinces after 1943
- Enacted by: Parliament of Canada
- Royal assent: 3 July 1934
- Commenced: S. 17 (nationwide); 3 July 1934; Remainder of Act: 1 September 1934 (Prairie Provinces); 1 October 1934 (Ontario and Quebec); 1 November 1934 (Remaining provinces)

Amended by
- SC 1935, cc. 20, 61; SC 1938, c. 47
- Status: Repealed

The Farmers' Creditors Arrangement Act, (French: Loi sur les arrangements entre cultivateurs et créanciers) was an Act of the Parliament of Canada that attempted to remedy a wave of insolvencies that occurred among Canadian farmers during the Great Depression. Originally framed to deal with such problems nationwide, it was gradually reduced in scope, and was reenacted in 1943 to apply solely to farmers in the Prairie Provinces.

== Background ==
By 1934, the farm debt problem in Canada, which had been provoked by the Great Depression, reached a scale where provincial moratory legislation (Note: as, in Ontario for example, The Mortgagors' and Purchasers' Relief Act, 1932, S.O. 1932, c. 49 , followed the following year by The Mortgagors' and Purchasers' Relief Act, 1933, S.O. 1933, c. 35) could not resolve it, as it could not remove the farmer from his position of default. The last agricultural census reported that 244,201 farms (33.61% of all farms in Canada) reported having mortgages totalling $677,000,000 (16.75% of the value of all farms, or 49% of the value of owned farms). Cash flow problems also resulted in a significant increase in the amount of short-term obligations. It reached the point where Prime Minister R.B. Bennett decided to introduce remedial legislation to address it at the federal level. The initial draft submitted by the Department of Finance addressed only voluntary arrangements between farmers and their creditors, but Bennett sent it back to add provisions designed to adjust principal and interest obligations to the productive value of the farm. As Bennett told the House of Commons, "The object, of course, is to keep the farmer on the farm; if possible to keep him cultivating the land on which he had lived."

The bill was introduced in June 1934, together with relief legislation concerning farm loans, and received Royal Assent a month later. M.A. MacPherson, a former Attorney General and Provincial Treasurer of Saskatchewan, was appointed to oversee the Act's initial implementation, before permanent oversight was assigned to staff in the Department.

== Framework ==
As originally passed, the Act provided for:

- Official Receivers to be appointed in each county or district of a province where an assignment or a petition might be a filed with respect to a farmer
- a farmer, who is unable to meet his liabilities as they come due, to be able to file a proposal for a composition, extension of time or scheme of arrangement with respect to his creditors, at any time before or after an assignment is filed
- such proposal to go ahead only with the concurrence of any secured creditor or person with a right of redemption over any applicable property (except in those cases where a proposal is formulated by a Board of Review)
- a stay of proceedings, not exceeding sixty days, where no creditor may exercise any remedy against property, or commence any proceedings relating to bankruptcy, debt recovery or realization of security
- the establishment of provincial Boards of Review, whose task would be to determine acceptable proposals (if, and only if, it can be done in fairness and justice to the debtor and creditors) where the creditors have declined to accept a farmer's proposal, and to submit their proposal (either with or without the creditors' consent) to the court for its approval, and such approved proposal would be binding
- failure to comply with the terms of a approval would constitute an act of bankruptcy, except where the court considers that such an act was due to causes beyond the farmer's control
- the reduction of interest payable, where a mortgage's annual rate of interest exceeds 7%, so that the contracted rate can only be enforced on the amount of interest then due, plus three months' further interest in lieu of notice, after which the annual interest rate is commuted to 5%

=== Subsequent amendments ===
In 1935, the Act was amended to provide for:

- specifying that a proposal would not automatically effect a discharge from bankruptcy
- the stay of proceedings to be extended from sixty to ninety days
- a farmer resident in Quebec to be able to make an assignment in bankruptcy where the Board declines to make a proposal and declares that his affairs can best be dealt with under the Bankruptcy Act
- the Act not to apply to any debt created after 1 May 1935, without the consent of the creditor
- the Act to cease to apply in British Columbia, other than for proposals already approved by the court or the Board of Review

In 1938, the Act was further amended to provide for:

- an expansion of the definition of "creditor" to include persons holding a mortgage, hypothec, pledge, charge, lien or privilege against the property of the debtor, notwithstanding any absence of privity of contract, as well as the vendor of real property where the debtor holds it under an agreement of sale
- providing for the legal representative of a farmer dying on or after 3 July 1934 to be able to continue proceedings or make a proposal on behalf of the estate
- a farmer to be deemed to have committed an act of bankruptcy where there is a default under the proposal
- an indefinite stay of proceedings until the date of the final disposition of the proposal
- the establishment of more than one Board of Review in a province
- no new proposals to be filed or accepted with respect to a specified province, on or after a date fixed by proclamation
- no new proposals by farmers (Note: other than farmers who were "soldier settlers" within the meaning of the Soldier Settlement Act) to be received in Manitoba or British Columbia after June 1939, or for any province other than Alberta and Saskatchewan after December 1939

== Attack on constitutional grounds ==
Many Canadian legal commentators at the time expected that the FCAA, together with 1933's Companies' Creditors Arrangement Act, would be declared unconstitutional as encroaching upon the provincial power over property and civil rights in relation to the rights of secured creditors, and they were astonished when both were upheld. The FCAA (and by extension the CCAA) was held to be constitutional by the Supreme Court of Canada, and the Judicial Committee of the Privy Council subsequently agreed. As Duff CJ noted in his judgment:

The statute is, by its express terms, incorporated into the general system of bankruptcy legislation in force in Canada and it is not open to dispute that legislation in respect of "compositions and arrangements is a natural and ordinary component of a system of bankruptcy and insolvency law". (Note: Reference re FCAA, pp. 393-394, quoting his judgment's introduction in Reference Re Companies' Creditors Arrangement Act, 1934 CanLII 72 at p. 660, [1934] SCR 659 (6 June 1934), Supreme Court (Canada))

== Replacement and repeal ==
The Act was repealed and replaced in 1943, with its scope limited to the provinces of Alberta, Saskatchewan and Manitoba, but it would fall into disuse later in the 1940s. It would remain dormant until its repeal in 1988, as a consequence of the passage of the Farm Debt Review Act in 1986.
