= Great Depression in Canada =

Impact of the worldwide economic depression in Canada

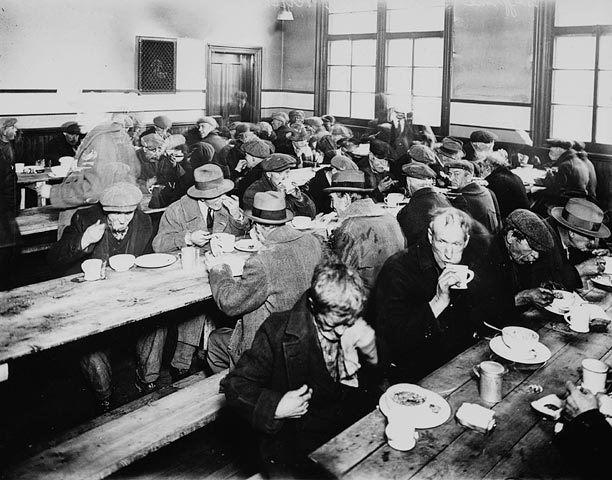
A Montreal soup kitchen in 1931

The worldwide Great Depression of the early 1930s was a social and economic shock that left millions of Canadians unemployed, hungry and often homeless. Few countries were affected as severely as Canada during what became known as the "Dirty Thirties", due to Canada's heavy dependence on exports which declined sharply in quantity and price, together with a crippling Prairies drought known as the Dust Bowl. Widespread losses of jobs and savings ultimately transformed the country by triggering the birth of social welfare, a variety of populist political movements, and a more activist role for government in the economy.

In 1930-1931 the Canadian government responded to the Great Depression by applying severe restrictions to entry into Canada. New rules limited immigration to British and American subjects or agriculturalists with money, certain classes of workers, and immediate family of the Canadian residents. About 25,000 unemployed immigrants were also deported.

== Economic results ==
By 1930, 30% of the labour force was out of work, and one fifth of the population became dependent on government assistance. Wages fell, as did prices. Gross National Expenditure had declined 42% from the 1929 levels. In some areas, the decline was far worse. In the rural areas of the prairies, two thirds of the population were on relief.

Further damage was the reduction of investment: both large companies and individuals were unwilling and unable to invest in new ventures.

In 1932, industrial production was only at 58% of the 1929 level, the second lowest level in the world after the United States, and well behind nations such as Britain, which only saw it fall to 83% of the 1929 level. Total national income fell to 55% of the 1929 level, again worse than any nation other than the U.S.

=== Impact ===
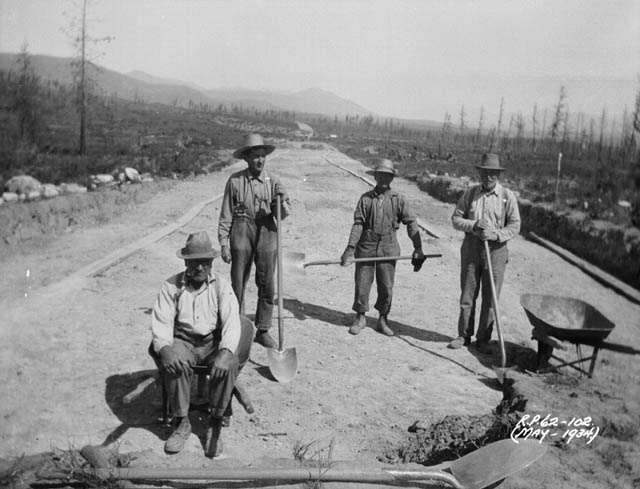
Relief Work repairing a highway

Canada's economy at the time was just starting to shift from primary industry (farming, fishing, mining and logging) to manufacturing. Exports of raw materials plunged, and employment, prices and profits fell in every sector. Canada was the worst-hit because of its economic position. It was further affected as its main trading partners were Britain and the U.S., both of which were badly affected by the worldwide depression.

One of the areas not affected was bush flying, which, thanks to a mining and exploration boom, continued to thrive throughout this period. Even so, most bush flying companies lost money, impacted by the government's cancellation of airmail contracts in 1931-2.

=== Unemployment ===
Urban unemployment nationwide was 19%; Toronto's rate was 17%, according to the census of 1931. Farmers who stayed on their farms were not considered unemployed. By 1933, 30% of the labour force was out of work, and one-fifth of the population became dependent on government assistance. Wages fell as did prices. In some areas, such as mining and lumbering areas, the decline was far worse.

=== Prairie Provinces ===
The Prairie Provinces and Western Canada were the hardest-hit. In the rural areas of the prairies, two thirds of the population were on relief. The region fully recovered after 1939. The fall of wheat prices drove many farmers to the towns and cities, such as Calgary, Alberta; Regina, Saskatchewan; and Brandon, Manitoba; many of them went west to British Columbia in a Canadian parallel to the “Okie” migration in the US from Plains states to California. Population in the prairie provinces fell below natural replacement level. There was also migration from the southern prairies affected by Dust Bowl conditions such as the Palliser's Triangle to aspen parkland in the north.

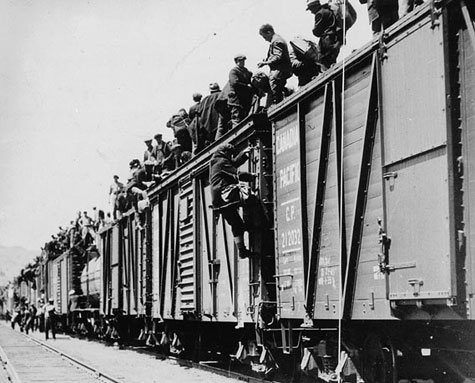
The On-To-Ottawa Trek

During the depression, there was a rise of working class militancy organized by the Communist Party. The labour unions largely retreated in response to the ravages of the depression at the same time that significant portions of the working class, including the unemployed, clamoured for collective action.

Numerous strikes and protests were led by the Communists, many of which culminated in violent clashes with the police. Some notable ones include a coal miners strike that resulted in the Estevan Riot in Estevan, Saskatchewan where four miners were killed by the RCMP in 1931, a waterfront strike in Vancouver that culminated with the "Battle of Ballantyne Pier" in 1935, and numerous unemployed demonstrations up to and including the On-to-Ottawa Trek that left one Regina police constable and one protester dead in the "Regina Riot". Although the actual number of Communist Party militants remained small, their impact was far disproportionate to their numbers, in large part because of the anticommunist reaction of the government, especially the policies of Prime Minister R. B. Bennett who vowed to crush Communism in Canada with an "iron heel of ruthlessness".

These conflicts diminished after 1935, when the Communist Party shifted strategies and Bennett's Conservatives were defeated. Agitation and unrest nonetheless persisted throughout the depression, marked by periodic clashes, such as a sit-down strike in Vancouver that ended with "Bloody Sunday". These developments had far-reaching consequences in shaping the postwar environment, including the domestic cold war climate, the rise of the welfare state, and the implementation of an institutional framework for industrial relations.

=== Women ===
Women's primary role were as housewives; without a steady flow of family income, their work became much harder in dealing with food and clothing and medical care. The birthrates fell everywhere, as children were postponed until families could financially support them. The average birthrate for 14 major countries fell 12% from 19.3 births per thousand population in 1930, to 17.0 in 1935. In Canada, half of Roman Catholic women defied Church teachings and used contraception to postpone births.

Among the few women in the labor force, layoffs were less common in the white-collar jobs and they were typically found in light manufacturing work. However, there was a widespread demand to limit families to one paid job, so that wives might lose employment if their husband was employed.

Housewives updated strategies their mothers used when they were growing up in poor families. Cheap foods were used, such as soups, beans and noodles. They purchased the cheapest cuts of meat—sometimes even horse meat—and recycled the Sunday roast into sandwiches and soups. They sewed and patched clothing, traded with their neighbors for outgrown items, and made do with colder homes. New furniture and appliances were postponed until better days. These strategies show that women's domestic labor—cooking, cleaning, budgeting, shopping, childcare—was essential to the economic maintenance of the family and offered room for economies. Many women also worked outside the home, or took boarders, did laundry for trade or cash, and did sewing for neighbors in exchange for something they could offer. Extended families used mutual aid—extra food, spare rooms, repair-work, cash loans—to help cousins and in-laws.

Women held 25-30% of the jobs in the cities. Few women were employed in heavy industry, railways or construction. Many were household workers or were employed in restaurants and family-owned shops. Women factory workers typically handled clothing and food. Educated women had a narrow range of jobs, such as clerical work and teaching. It was expected that a woman give up a good job when she married. Srigley emphasizes the wide range of background factors and family circumstances, arguing that gender itself was typically less important than race, ethnicity, or class.

=== Teachers ===
School budgets were cut a lot across the country, although enrollments went up and up because dropouts could not find jobs. To save money the districts consolidated nearby schools, dropped staff lines, postponed new construction, and increased class size. Middle-class well-educated teachers were squeezed by the financial crisis facing their employers. In Ontario, new teachers were not hired so the average age and experience increased. However, their salaries fell and men who otherwise would have taken higher status business jobs increasingly competed against women. Married women were not hired on the grounds it was unfair for one family to have two scarce jobs that breadwinners needed. Women teachers, who had made major gains in the 1910-20 era, saw themselves discriminated against. The teacher's unions were practically helpless in the crisis, even in Ontario where they were strongest. After prosperity returned in the 1940s, however, money was available again, there was a shortage of teachers, and the unions proved more effective. For example, in Quebec, the Corporation Général des Instituteurs et des Institutrices Catholics (CIC) was founded in 1946 (it became the Centrale de l'Enseignement du Québec (CEQ) in 1967). It sought higher pensions and salaries and better working conditions, while insisting the teachers were full-fledged professionals. In remote rural areas professionalization was uncommon; local school boards tightly controlled the one-room schools, typically hiring local women with a high school education or a year at university as teachers, so their meagre salaries would remain in the community.

=== Labour policy ===
Case studies of four Canadian textile firms—two cotton and two hosiery and knitting—demonstrate the range business response to the economic crisis. Each faced a different array of conditions, and each devised the appropriate restructuring strategies. The large corporations responded by investing in more expensive machinery and automation, hiring fewer skilled workers to tend the automated equipment, and tweaking their product lines to changing consumer tastes. However the smaller hosiery and knitting firms lacked the capital to invest or the research needed to monitor consumer tastes. They used time-tested "Taylorized" scientific management or made piecemeal changes. Power shifted upward to management, as strikes were too risky in the early 1930s and the opportunity to find a better job had drastically narrowed. By 1935, however, the influence of militant American unions spilled over the border and Canadian unions became more forceful and harmonious. The activity was most notable in Ontario's automobile factories, beginning in Windsor in late 1936, where the new Automobile Workers of America (UAW) chartered its first Canadian local at the Kelsey-Hayes factory.

== World trade ==
The Stock Market crash in New York led people to hoard their money; as consumption fell, the American economy steadily contracted, 1929-32. Given the close economic links between the two countries, the collapse quickly affected Canada. Added to the woes of the prairies were those of Ontario and Quebec, whose manufacturing industries were now victims of overproduction. Massive lay-offs occurred and other companies collapsed into bankruptcy. This collapse was not as sharp as that in the United States, but was the second sharpest collapse in the world.

Canada did have some advantages over other countries, especially its extremely stable banking system that had no failures during the entire depression, compared to over 9,000 small banks that collapsed in the United States.

Canada was hurt badly because of its reliance on base commodities, whose prices fell by over 50%, and because of the importance of international trade. In the 1920s about 25% of the Canadian Gross National Product was derived from exports. The first reaction of the U.S. was to raise tariffs via the Smoot-Hawley Tariff Act, passed into law June 17, 1930. This hurt the Canadian economy more than most other countries in the world, and Canada retaliated by raising its own rates on American exports and by switching business to the Empire.

In an angry response to Smoot–Hawley, Canada welcomed the British introduction of trade protectionism and a system of Commonwealth preference during the winter of 1931-32. It helped Canada avoid external default on their public debt during the Great Depression. Canada had a high degree of exposure to the international economy, which left Canada susceptible to any international economic downturn. The onset of the depression created critical balance of payment deficits, and it was largely the extension of imperial protection by Britain that gave Canada the opportunity to increase their exports to the British market. By 1938 Britain was importing more than twice the 1929 volume of products from Australia, while the value of products shipped from Canada more than doubled, despite the dramatic drop in prices. Thus, the British market played a vital role in helping Canada and Australia stabilize their balance of payments in the immensely difficult economic conditions of the 1930s.

== Government reaction ==
At the Depression, the provincial and municipal governments were already in debt after an expansion of infrastructure and education during the 1920s. It thus fell to the federal government to try to improve the economy. When the Depression began Mackenzie King was Prime Minister. He believed that the crisis would pass, refused to provide federal aid to the provinces, and only introduced moderate relief efforts. The government's reaction to The Great Depression is the focus of the 2013 documentary Catch The Westbound Train from Prairie Coast Films.

=== New Deal ===
The Bennett Government, which defeated Mackenzie King in the 1930 election, initially refused to offer large-scale aid or relief to the provinces, much to the anger of provincial premiers, but it eventually gave in and started a Canadian "New Deal" type of relief by 1935. By 1937, the worst of the Depression had passed, but it left its mark on the country's economic landscape. Atlantic Canada was especially hard hit. Newfoundland (an independent dominion at the time) was bankrupt economically and politically and gave up responsible government by reverting to direct British control.

First World War veterans built on a history of postwar political activism to play an important role in the expansion of state-sponsored social welfare in Canada. Arguing that their wartime sacrifices had not been properly rewarded, veterans claimed that they were entitled to state protection from poverty and unemployment on the home front. The rhetoric of patriotism, courage, sacrifice, and duty created powerful demands for jobs, relief, and adequate pensions that should, veterans argued, be administered as a right of social citizenship and not a form of charity. At the local, provincial, and national political levels, veterans fought for compensation and recognition for their war service, and made their demands for jobs and social security a central part of emerging social policy.

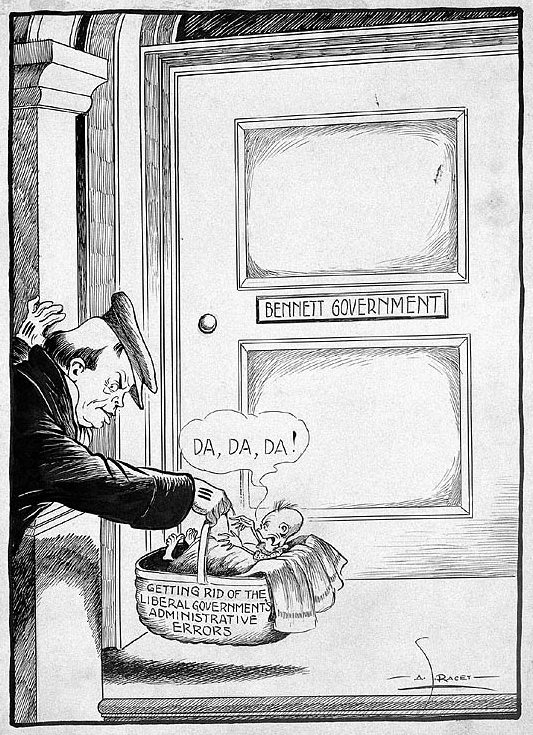
Blaming it on Bennett: A 1931 political cartoon suggests that Liberals had failed to take responsibility for their own errors.

The Liberal Party lost the 1930 election to the Conservative Party, led by R.B. Bennett. Bennett, a successful western businessman, campaigned on high tariffs and large-scale spending. Make-work programs were begun, and welfare and other assistance programs became vastly larger. This led to a large federal deficit, however. Bennett became wary of the budget shortfalls by 1932, and cut back severely on federal spending. This only deepened the depression as government employees were put out of work and public works projects were cancelled.

One of the greatest burdens on the government was the Canadian National Railway (CNR). The federal government had taken over a number of defunct and bankrupt railways during the First World War and the 1920s. The debt the government assumed was over $2 billion, a massive sum at the time, but during the boom years it seemed payable. The Depression turned this debt into a crushing burden. Due to the decrease in trade, the CNR also began to lose substantial amounts of money during the Depression, and had to be further bailed out by the government.

With falling support and the depression only getting worse, Bennett attempted to introduce policies based on the New Deal of Franklin Delano Roosevelt in the United States. Bennett thus called for a minimum wage, unemployment insurance, and other such programs. This effort was largely unsuccessful; the provinces challenged the rights of the federal government to manage these programs. Some of the federal efforts were successful: the Companies' Creditors Arrangement Act and Farmers' Creditors Arrangement Act, which provided alternatives to bankruptcy for distressed businesses, were held to be constitutional by the Reference Re Farmers' Creditors Arrangement Act.

The judicial and political failure of Bennett's New Deal legislation shifted the struggle to reconstitute capitalism to the provincial and municipal levels of the state. Attempts to deal with the dislocations of the Great Depression in Ontario focused on the "sweatshop crisis" that came to dominate political and social discourse after 1934. Ontario's 1935 Industrial Standards Act (ISA) was designed to bring workers and employers together under the auspices of the state to establish minimum wages and work standards. The establishment of New Deal style industrial codes was premised on the mobilization of organized capital and organized labour to combat unfair competition, stop the spread of relief-subsidized labour, and halt the predations of sweatshop capitalism. Although the ISA did not bring about extensive economic regulation, it excited considerable interest in the possibility of government intervention. Workers in a diverse range of occupations, from asbestos workers to waitresses, attempted to organize around the possibility of the ISA. The importance of the ISA lies in what it reveals about the nature of welfare, wage labour, the union movement, competitive capitalism, business attitudes toward industrial regulation, and the role of the state in managing the collective affairs of capitalism. The history of the ISA also suggests that "regulatory unionism", as described by Colin Gordon in his work on the American New Deal, may have animated key developments in Canadian social, economic, and labour history.

The failure to help the economy led to the federal Conservatives' defeat in the 1935 election when the Liberals, still led by Mackenzie King, returned to power.

The public at large lost faith in both the Liberal Party of Canada and the Conservative Party of Canada. This caused the rise of a third party: the Cooperative Commonwealth Federation (a socialist party that achieved some success before joining the Canadian Labour Congress in 1961, becoming the New Democratic Party).

With the worst of the Depression over, the government implemented some relief programs such as the National Housing Act and National Employment Commission, and it established Trans-Canada Airlines (1937, the predecessor to Air Canada). However, it took until 1939 and the outbreak of war for the Canadian economy to return to 1929 levels.

=== Liberals return ===
After 1936 the prime minister lost patience when westerners preferred radical alternatives such as the CCF (Co-operative Commonwealth Federation) and Social Credit to his middle-of-the-road liberalism. Indeed, he came close to writing off the region with his comment that the prairie dust bowl was "part of the U.S. desert area. I doubt if it will be of any real use again." Instead he paid more attention to the industrial regions and the needs of Ontario and Quebec regarding the proposed St. Lawrence Seaway project with the United States. As for the unemployed, he was hostile to federal relief and reluctantly accepted a Keynesian solution that involved federal deficit spending, tax cuts and subsidies to the housing market.

Mackenzie King returned as prime minister, serving until his retirement in 1948. During all but the last two years he was also secretary of state for external affairs, taking personal charge of foreign policy.

=== Social Credit ===
Social Credit (often called SoCred) was a populist political movement strongest in Alberta and neighbouring British Columbia, 1930s-1970s. Social Credit was based on the economic theories of an Englishman, C. H. Douglas. His theories became very popular across the nation in the early 1930s. A central proposal was the free distribution of dividends (or social credit), called "funny money" by the opposition.

During the Great Depression in Canada the demand for radical action peaked around 1934, after the worst period was over and the economy was recovering. Mortgage debt was significant because farmers could not meet their interest payments. The insecurity of farmers, whose debts were increasing and who had no legal protection against foreclosure, was a potent factor in creating a mood of political desperation. The radical farmers party, UFA was baffled by the depression and Albertans demanded new leadership.

Prairie farmers had always believed that they were being exploited by Toronto and Montreal. What they lacked was a prophet who would lead them to the promised land. The Social Credit movement began in Alberta in 1932; it became a political movement in 1935 and suddenly burned like a prairie fire. The prophet and new premier was radio evangelist William Aberhart (1878–1943). The message was biblical prophecy. Aberhart was a fundamentalist, preaching the revealed word of God and quoting the Bible to find a solution for the evils of the modern, materialistic world: the evils of sophisticated academics and their biblical criticism, the cold formality of middle-class congregations, the vices of dancing and movies and drink. "Bible Bill" preached that the capitalist economy was rotten because of its immorality; specifically it produced goods and services but did not provide people with sufficient purchasing power to enjoy them. This could be remedied by the giving out money in the form of "social credit", or $25 a month for every man and woman. This pump priming was guaranteed to restore prosperity, he prophesied to the 1600 Social Credit clubs he formed in the province.

Alberta's businessmen, professionals, newspaper editors and the traditional middle-class leaders vehemently protested Aberhart's crack-pot ideas, but they had not solved any problems and spoke not of the promised land ahead. Aberhart's new party in 1935 elected 56 members to the Alberta Assembly, compared to 7 for all the other parties.

Alberta's Social Credit Party remained in power for 36 years until 1971. It was re-elected by popular vote no less than 9 times, achieving success by moving from left to the right.

==== Social Credit in office ====
Once in office in Alberta, Aberhart gave a high priority to balancing the provincial budget. He reduced expenditures and increased the sales tax and the income tax. The poor and unemployed got nothing. The $25 monthly social dividend never arrived, as Aberhart decided nothing could be done until the province's financial system was changed, and 1936 Alberta defaulted on its bonds. He did pass the Debt Adjustment Act that cancelled all the interest on mortgages since 1932 and limited all interest rates on mortgages to 5%, in line with similar laws passed by other provinces. In 1937 backbenchers passed a radical banking law that was disallowed by the national government (banking was a federal responsibility). Efforts to control the press were also disallowed. The party was authoritarian and tried to exert detailed control over its officeholders; those who rebelled were purged or removed from office by the new device of recall elections. Although Aberhart was hostile to banks and newspapers, he was basically in favour of capitalism and did not support socialist policies as did the Cooperative Commonwealth Federation (CCF) in Saskatchewan.

By 1938 the Social Credit government abandoned its notions about the $25 payouts, but its inability to break with UFA policies led to disillusionment and heavy defections from the party. Aberhart's government was re-elected in the 1940 election, carrying 43% of the vote. The prosperity of the Second World War relieved the economic fears and hatreds that had fuelled farmer unrest. Aberhart died in 1943, and was succeeded as Premier by his student at the Prophetic Bible Institute and lifelong close disciple, Ernest C. Manning (1908–1996).

The Social Credit party, now firmly on the right, governed Alberta until 1968 under Manning.

== Recovery ==
The Canadian recovery from the Great Depression proceeded slowly. Economists Pedro Amaral and James MacGee find that the Canadian recovery has important differences with the United States. In the U.S. productivity recovered quickly while the labour force remained depressed throughout the decade. In Canada employment quickly recovered but productivity remained well below trend. Amaral and MacGee suggest that this decline is due to the sustained reduction in international trade during the 1930s.

In the midst of the Great Depression, the Crown-in-Council attempted to uplift the people, and created two national corporations: the Canadian Radio Broadcasting Commission (CRBC), and the Bank of Canada. The former, established in 1932, was seen as a means to keep the country unified and uplifted in these harsh economic times. Many poor citizens found radio as an escape and used it to restore their own faiths in a brighter future. Broadcasting coast to coast mainly in English, with some French, primarily in Quebec, the CRBC played a vital role in keeping the morale up for Canadians everywhere. The latter was used to regulate currency and credit which had been horribly managed amongst Canadian citizens in the prior years. It was also set up to serve as a private banker’s bank and to assist and advise the Canadian government on its own debts and financial matters. The bank played an important role to help steer government spending in the right direction. The bank's effort took place through the tough years of the depression and on to the prosperity that followed into and after the Second World War.

Both of these corporations were seen as positive moves by the Canadian government to help get the economy back on track. 1937 was an important year in the recovery from the Great Depression. The Bank of Canada was nationalized in that year, and the Canadian Radio Broadcasting Commission (CRBC) became the Canadian Broadcasting Corporation (CBC) in that same year. Both corporations were successful aids in the cultural and financial recovery of the Canadian economy during the Great depression.

It took the outbreak of World War II to pull Canada out of the depression. From 1939, an increased demand in Europe for materials, and increased spending by the Canadian government created a strong boost for the economy. Unemployed men enlisted in the military. By 1939, Canada was in the first prosperity period in the business cycle in a decade. This coincided with the recovery in the American economy, which created a better market for exports and a new inflow of much needed capital.

== See also ==
- Canada in the World Wars and Interwar Years
- Cities in the Great Depression
- List of riots and civil unrest in Calgary
