= Relief Camp Workers' Union =

Canadian Great Depression era relief worker's union

Relief Camp Workers' Union was a Canadian Great Depression era relief union in which the workers employed in the Canadian government relief camps organized themselves into in the early 1930s. The RCWU was established by the Workers' Unity League and was associated with the Communist Party of Canada. The creation of the union was a direct response to the conditions of the camps and the lack of financial compensation for the work the men provided. The union is best known for helping to organize the On-to-Ottawa Trek during the Great Depression.

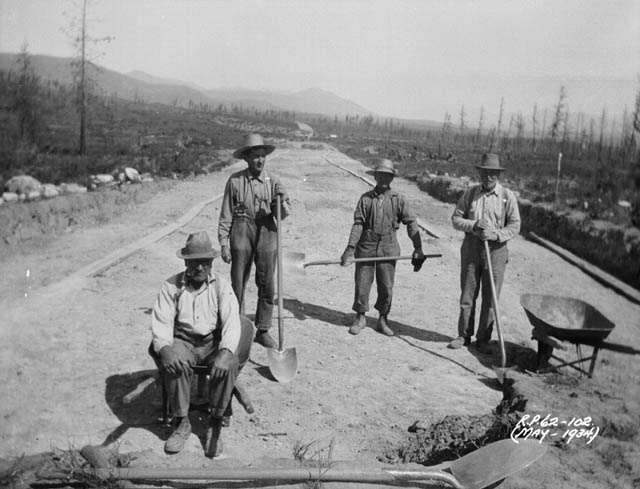
Relief Projects No. 62: Road construction at Kimberly-Wasa, British Columbia.

== Historical context and the origins of relief camps in Canada ==
Municipal, provincial, and federal governments disputed over how to deal with the growing numbers of the unemployed, and - as a consequence of this - with the growing hostility from the initial lack of action and guidance from the different levels of government. Relief, initially, was the responsibility of municipal governments - but the increasing numbers of unemployed in the early years was already straining the small financial reserves that municipalities had. The Ontario government, for example, introduced public works in urban and isolated areas early on to help ease unemployment, but between 1929 and 1932 employment fell by 32 percent and these early relief systems could no longer cope. In British Columbia, the province's reliance on the exportation of raw materials meant that citizens were hit particularly hard by the Depression - similarly to Ontario, unemployment had reached 30% by 1933. In the prairies, years of droughts and failed crops, in combination with declining commodity prices, caused families with long-standing histories in the region to pack up and move westward in search of employment. Vancouver became a hub for transient workers and their families as, in contrast to smaller communities, it had a pre-established Relief Department. Moreover, British Columbia offered a more temperate climate compared to the rest of Canada, meaning those who were without homes were less likely to freeze overnight or during the winter months.

=== Relief for married vs single men ===
Before the establishment of government camps, single men found it difficult to receive relief. Social attitudes at the time, and the fact that the Depression predated the emergence of the welfare state in Canada, meant that accepting relief came with a certain amount of stigma. At this point in history, Canadians commonly believed that men "should engage in waged work and be individualistic, productive and physically strong". Even during the Depression, Canadian society believed that single men should be responsible for themselves and not burden their families by staying with them if they were not contributing a wage. In Guelph, Ontario, men with dependants were given two days work a week whereas single men with no dependants were given two days work every two weeks. As the Depression worsened, single men were given work two days work every three weeks and were often paid in cash and with relief vouchers. This cultural sentiment towards men and a favouritization of married men or men with dependants caused a mass migration of transient men looking for employment in Canada. The responsibility to then relieve tensions fell on the federal government.

=== Federal relief camps ===
The government of Canada was aware of unrest due to the Depression and feared that lack of economic opportunity might turn the mostly single unemployed men to communism or to communist ideas. These fears, coupled with pre-existing fears that pre-dated the Depression, encouraged the federal government to outlaw the Communist Party of Canada in 1931. Government officials needed a place to put single men and give them something to do in order to curb communist ideas and sentiments. In 1932 Major-General Andrew McNaughton, then the chief of General Staff of the Department of National Defence, toured the country's military districts to examine the unemployment problem. At the time of his national tour one estimate found over “70,000 mostly single, young, unemployed, homeless men in Canada.”

McNaughton proposed the idea of relief camps to provide men with work to fill their days, food, clothing, medical attention, and some compensation to ease tensions. McNaughton's relief camps were designed to provide the basic necessities for single men in return for manual labour. This proposed system resembled the English Poor Laws in which the poor received helped in exchange for labour and rehabilitation. In October of 1932 the first federal relief camps opened in Canada. In November of 1932 camps started in eastern Canada and immediately housed over 2000 men. To cut costs, the government set up these camps in or in close proximity to existing military facilities and used the military's personnel and administrative experience to keep the camps running effectively. Each camp worked on "projects"; British Columbia had 53 projects and Ontario 37. The system tended to locate camps in more isolated and rural areas and away from urban "agitators" trying to spread communist ideas. Historians and other scholars continue to debate the effectiveness of the camps, but overall, they did help to ease tensions at the start of the Depression.

== Origins and Emergence of the Union in Camps ==
=== Life in the Camps ===
The federal government wanted to run the camps as effectively and as cheaply as possible but were still required to provide clothing, food, medical care, and money for all men employed in the camps. Although these terms were met, the quality of the food, clothing, and housing were repeatedly called into question. The biggest point of contention was the money to which the men were promised. The men worked for twenty cents per day for each day worked but there was much debate about whether the payment was a wage or an allowance. Moreover, there were issues with money being withheld from the workers.

=== Grievances ===
Grievances about the camp system were numerous, from the poor quality food, the lack of leisure facilities (bathrooms and showers), and that the men were only paid twenty cents per day. Complaints came from both internal and external sources. Organized labour outside of the camps criticized the cheap labour as it meant organized union workers from various trades would be less likely to receive work. Internally, workers in these camps recognized that a paradox existed; they knew their work was valuable yet they were simultaneously marginalized by society because of their social and economic status. This paradox caused relief workers to organize. They believed that since their work was valuable as they were constructing roads, airways, and forestry infrastructure, that they should be paid a fair wage. Certainly conditions were a source of grievance but they were tied into the fight for more money and less military control.

The federal government tried to maintain individuality among the men as to eliminate or stop the spread of an emerging collective conscious. This did not work as relief workers organized and created the RCWU. During relief camp strikes, workers and the union pressed for forty cents per hour as well as a five day work week, working a total of seven hours per day. RCWU rhetoric painted the relief camps as ‘slave camps’ and workers were engaged in ‘slave wage labour’. These sentiments and the growing discontent consequently caused the RCWU's numbers to quickly swell. The emergence of the RCWU was cause for concern and being associated with or organizing collectively within the camps would result in expulsion from the camps. As a result, RCWU organizers worked covertly in building the union because they faced being blacklisted from the camps.

== Camp Strikes ==
The RCWU organized its first strike in December 1934. In the four years that the federal relief camps ran, there were "359 recorded strikes, riots, demonstrations, and disturbances in all projects across Canada." Since the union was established by the WUL, they used their experience in organizing the unemployed in urban relief camps. The strikes were short-lived and the strikers returned to the camps with just a promise of a government commission to investigate their complaints.

In Ontario and in other areas, the disturbances were not as severe as those in British Columbia because there were far fewer men in these camps and therefore, far fewer 'agitators' making their way to those camps.

The RCWU managed to provide lodging and food for its members but by the end of May of 1935, their resources had begun to run dry and the demonstrations became fewer and far between. The RCWU was left with little resources but they did have a growing number of unhappy men. In June of 1935, the men embarked on a long journey which is now known as the On-to-Ottawa Trek. They rode on top of freight trains headed east to present their demands for Prime Minister Bennett in Ottawa but were subsequently stopped in the city of Regina.

== RCWU Strikes Outside the Camps ==
While in Vancouver, they protested regularly to raise public awareness of their rights. RCWU organizers made it a priority to maintain discipline in the ranks so as not to alienate public opinion. One occasion in particular was an exception to this rule. During one of the RCWU "snake parades", marching in a zig zag through the streets, usually in columns of two, the leader noticed that the entrance to the Hudson's Bay Company department store was unguarded. Other stores all had guards posted and shut their doors because the protesters would parade through the stores to present their case to shoppers. This time, on April 26, the manager of the store telephoned the police, who promptly arrived and attempted to eject the men. A fight ensued, ending with broken display cases and several injuries. One police officer was severely injured. The demonstrators and other protesters converged for a rally at Victory Square, where Mayor McGeer came and read the riot act and the crowd dispersed. Another notable moment during the relief camp strike was when a group of RCWU strikers occupied the city museum for eight hours, coming out only after a promise was given that the city would give them money to feed the strikers for three days.

Intransigence at all three levels of government became apparent throughout the strike, with the civic government looking to the provincial and federal governments to take responsibility for the crisis of unemployment. The provincial Liberal government had been elected on the platform of "Work and Wages", a slogan appropriated by the strikers to emphasize that this promise had gone unfulfilled. The federal Conservative government under R.B. "Iron Heel" Bennett, meanwhile, argued that policing and relief were provincial and municipal responsibilities, but if they could not control the situation themselves, a request could be made for federal forces under "aid to civil defense" provisions. This intransigence helped to generate public support for the strikers, even among conservatives who agreed that the "Red Menace" was a real threat to Canadian society and should be dealt a decisive blow.

The city, provincial, and federal police were all standing by during the strike, along with several hundred special constables because, the government claimed, it was part of a larger plot on the part of the Communists, on orders from Moscow, to spark a general strike in Vancouver. Another strike was developing amongst longshoremen, whose union was also under WUL leadership, and the government feared that the two might merge into one large strike, which might spread. The relief camp strikers, however, decided that they had accomplished all they could in Vancouver, and voted to take their grievances to Ottawa in what became the more famous On-to-Ottawa Trek.

== After the Trek ==
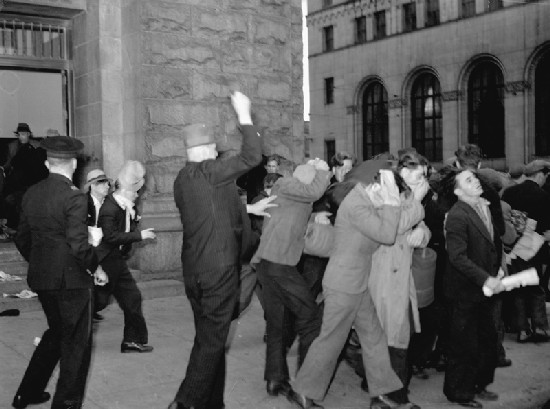
A plainclothes Mountie attacking protesters during the eviction of the Post Office in 1938.

The On-to-Ottawa Trek was crushed in Regina, and most of the men returned to the camps, but their efforts instigated the process which would lead to significant reforms and were later considered by historians to be an important turning point paving the way for the post war welfare state in Canada. In 1935, the Communists' abandoned the Third Period doctrine under which the WUL toiled, and many RCWU Communists left to fight fascism in the Spanish Civil War with the Mackenzie-Papineau Battalion. The relief camp issue would once again descend on Vancouver in 1938 when the RCWU's successor, the Relief Project Workers' Union led another walk out and another series of protests. The climax this time came when, on May 20, 1938, a group of protesters occupied a number of buildings including the post office in the Winch Building (now the Sinclair Centre). Over a thousand men continued to occupy the post office for almost a month, until they were violently removed by the Royal Canadian Mounted Police on June 18 in what came to be known as "Bloody Sunday." Many were injured (including several police officers) and 28 men were jailed. Protesters in Vancouver and Victoria demanded the release of the prisoners and the resignation of Premier Patullo.

== Leaders ==
Leaders of the RCWU included

- Arthur "Slim" Evans
- Ernest (Smokey) Cumber
- Matt Shaw
- Malcolm MacLeod
- Ronald Liversedge
- James "Red" Walsh
- Perry Hilton
- Lionel Edwards
- Steve Brody
- Bob "Doc" Savage
- Mike McCauley
- Bill Davis
- Gerry Winters
- Jack Cosgrove
- Steward "Paddy" O'Neil.

== Sources ==
- Lorne Brown, When Freedom was Lost: The Unemployed, the Agitator, and the State, Montreal: Black Rose Books, 1987.
- Victor Howard, "We Were the Salt of the Earth": A Narrative of the On-to-Ottawa Trek and the Regina Riot. Regina: Canadian Plains Research Centre, University of Regina, 1985.
- Ronald Liversedge, Recollections of the On To Ottawa Trek, ed. Victor Hoar. Toronto: McClelland and Stewart, 1973.
- John Manley, "Canadian Communists, Revolutionary Unionism, and the 'Third Period': The Workers' Unity League, 1929–1935," Journal of the Canadian Historical Association, New Series, vol. 5 (1994): 167-194.
- Bill Waiser, All Hell Can't Stop Us: The On-to-Ottawa Trek and Regina Riot. Calgary: Fifth House, 2003.
