= Arthur "Slim" Evans =

Canadian trade unionist (1890–1944)

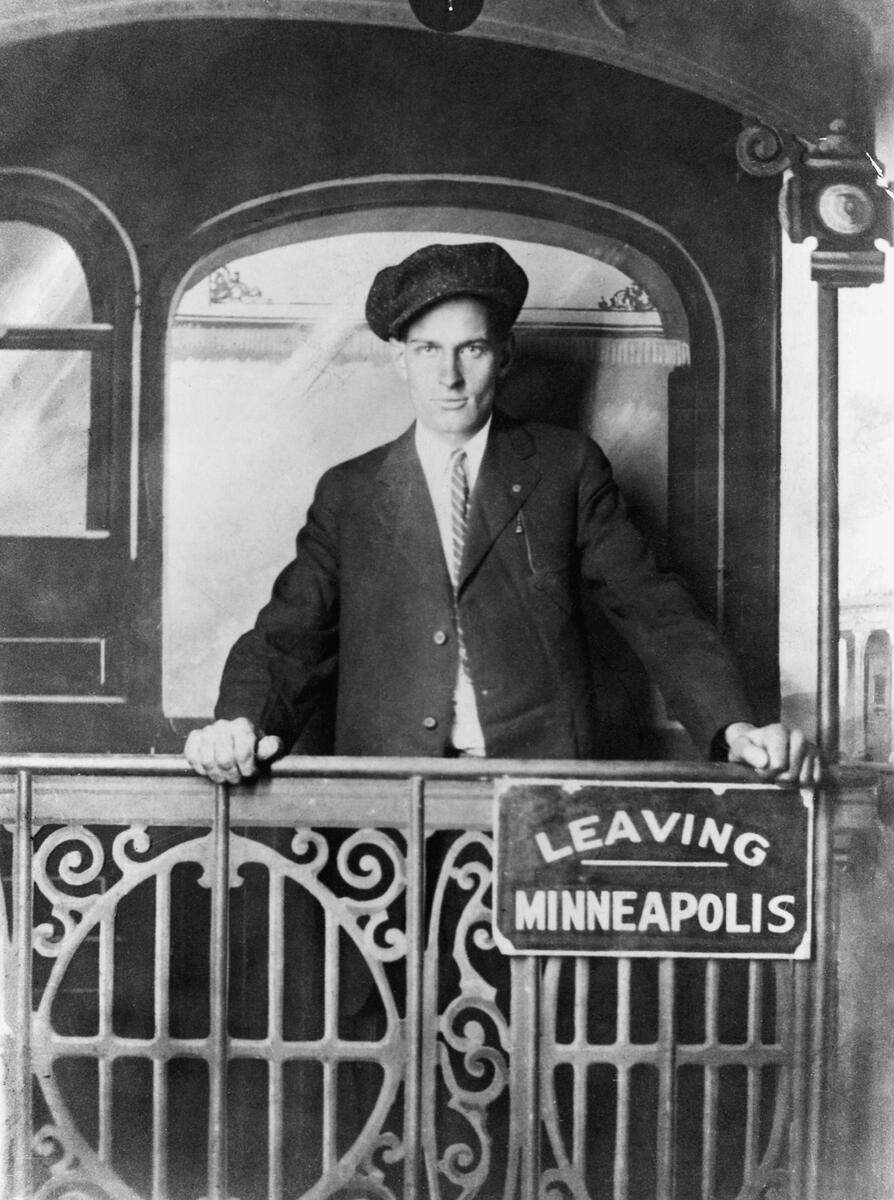
- Arthur "Slim" Evans, c. 1911
- Born: Arthur Herbert Evans; April 24, 1890; Toronto, Canada
- Died: February 13, 1944 (aged 53); Vancouver, Canada
- Occupations: Trade Unionist, carpenter
- Organizations: Industrial Workers of the World; One Big Union; Workers Unity League
- Known for: Leading the On to Ottawa Trek
- Political party: Communist

Arthur Herbert "Slim" Evans (April 24, 1890 – February 13, 1944) led the industrial labour union movement in Canada and the United States. He is most known for leading the On To Ottawa Trek. Evans was involved in the Industrial Workers of the World, the One Big Union, and the Workers' Unity League. He was a member of the Communist Party of Canada.

== Personal life ==
Evans was born in Toronto in 1890. At age 13, he left school to support his family. He worked numerous jobs, including horse driver and carpenter. Evans travelled west in 1911 and worked in various places, first as a farmer, then as a carpenter in Winnipeg, Minneapolis and Kansas City.

On August 4, 1920, Arthur "Slim" Evans married Ethel Hawkins, whom he met while organizing miners in Drumheller, Alberta. On April 13, 1922, the couple had their first child, a son named Stewart. Stewart Evans died in 1925 during the diphtheria epidemic in Vancouver. They had a second child, Jean Stewart Evans, on February 12, 1927. Jean would go on to write "Work and Wages!", a biography of her father.

== Wobblies ==
In Minneapolis, he became involved with the Industrial Workers of the World (IWW, or "Wobblies"). He led an IWW free speech rally in Minneapolis, where he was arrested for participating and sentenced to three years in jail. Evans later recalled: "All I did was read it. I was too shy and nervous then to make up any speech of my own." In 1912, he led a strike of political prisoners, resulting in his release.

He was present at the 1913 miners' strike in Ludlow, Colorado. He met IWW leaders "Big" Bill Haywood, Frank Little, and the legendary Joe Hill there. Two days after Evans arrived, strikebreakers hired by John D. Rockefeller, owner of the coal mines, attacked the strikers' camp, killing 20 people, including 12 children, in the Ludlow Massacre. Evans was shot in the leg with a machine gun. He walked with a limp for the rest of his life as a result.

Evans returned to Canada and continued his union activism. He led the One Big Union local of coal miners in Drumheller, Alberta. He led a strike of 6,300 One Big Union miners during the Canadian Labour Revolt in 1919. It was there he met his future wife Ethel, daughter of a Drumheller miner who had been involved in organizing the union. The strike was suppressed by anti-union mercenaries hired by the mining company. Because the One Big Union was not recognized, and workers were officially organized within the United Mine Workers, Evans had technically organized a 'wild cat' strike without permission. Evans used UMWA funds for the strike, he was accused of embezzlement and sentenced to a three-year prison term. Evan was released upon a petition from the workers he supposedly embezzled from.

Evans, and other former wobblies became a member of the Communist Party of Canada after it formed in 1921. Evans officially became a party member in 1926.

== Worker's Unity League ==
The Worker's Unity League was the official trade union centre of the Communist Party of Canada. Like the IWW and OBU, which Evans had previously organized, the Workers' Unity League was an industrial union. Evans was a major organizer within the union.

=== Princeton coal miner's strike ===
In 1932, coal miners saw their wages cut by 10% in Princeton, British Columbia. The miners contacted the Workers' Unity League, which sent Evans to organize a union in September 1932. The company refused to negotiate with the union, so the workers voted to strike. Evans advised the workers to wait until December to strike, because the demand for coal would be much higher. The strike began on December 22. British Columbia's attorney general dispatched crops of 40 RCMP officers to monitor Evans and suppress the strike. Officers assaulted the striking miners with batons, along with their families, while they were picketing. The Ku Klux Klan burned crosses, beat strikers, and sent threatening letters in the name of anti-communism.

Evans was arrested under Section 98, which allows arbitrary detention of suspected communists. He was imprisoned in far off Oakella Prison, where he did hard-labour before being released on bail. During his imprisonment, his wife and daughter were evicted from the home Evan had built for them. Following his release, Evans was kidnapped by off duty police constables and klansmen. A convoy of armed cars took him to Vancouver. The kidnappers threatened: "Take warning and move on or suffer the consequences". Evans immediately booked a train back to Princeton, where he led the strike to success, winning workers higher pay and improved workplace safety. Evans was again arrested under Section 98 and sentenced to one year in prison without bail. He rejected the legitimacy of the trial, and instead of defending himself, he sang The Internationale.

=== On-to-Ottawa trek ===
In 1935, Evans led the On-to-Ottawa Trek. Communist activists, including Evans, had organized workers in the government relief camps into the Relief Camp Workers' Union three years previously, in 1932. Relief camp workers struck on April 4, 1935, when they went to Vancouver, where they stayed and pressed their demands until the Trek began on June 3. The first batch of strikers left Vancouver, riding on boxcars, and were joined by many others in Kamloops, Field, Golden, Calgary and Moose Jaw. By the time they reached Regina, Saskatchewan, their numbers had climbed to over 2,000. Evans led a delegation to go ahead of the strikers and meet with the prime minister, R. B. "Iron Heel" Bennett. The two leaders engaged in a heated exchange when Bennett accused Evans of being an embezzler. Evans' response received much publicity:

You are a liar. I was arrested for fraudulently converting these funds to feed the starving, instead of sending them to the agents at Indianapolis, and I again say you are a liar if you say I embezzled, and I will have the pleasure of telling the workers throughout Canada that I was forced to tell the premier of Canada he was a liar. Don't think you can pull off anything like that. You are not intimidating me a damned bit.

The meeting accomplished little more than to illustrate the government's intransigence and the strikers' determination, and the delegation left Ottawa to rejoin the strikers in Regina.

Evans and other Trek leaders were arrested at a large demonstration of strikers and supporters on July 1, 1935 (now called Dominion Day, or Canada Day), precipitating the Regina Riot. The federal government had decided that the Trek would be forcibly stopped in Regina because of fears that it would gain momentum if allowed to reach Winnipeg, that could turn it from a protest into a revolutionary movement.

Evans was charged under Section 98, a section of the Criminal Code added in the aftermath of the Winnipeg General Strike, outlawing membership in revolutionary organizations. An exhaustive government inquiry was held into the causes of the riot, and its conclusions paved the way for reforming the relief camp system. This outcome and the overwhelming defeat of R. B. Bennett are two indicators that the strike was a success, even though the Trek was crushed.

=== Later organizing ===
Evans continued his union activism, organizing the miners and smelter workers in Trail, British Columbia, into the CIO union, Mine, Mill, and Smelters Union. While organizing the smelters, his car was torched by the mine owners. He also led fundraising drives for the Mackenzie-Papineau Battalion, the volunteer contingent from Canada that fought the fascists during the Spanish Civil War. His last union position was as the shop steward at the Vancouver Shipyards.

== Death ==
He died in Vancouver on February 13, 1944, aged 53. After leaving a streetcar, he was struck by a motorist crossing between the streets of Kingsway and Joyce.
