= On-to-Ottawa Trek =

1935 protest movement by unemployed workers against the Canadian government

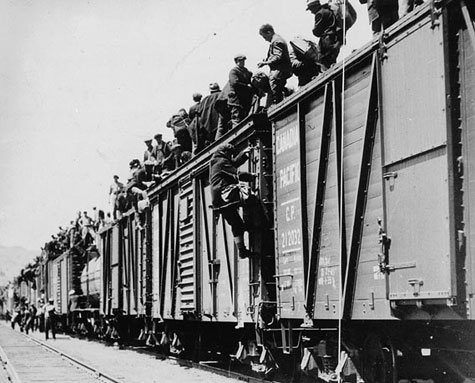
Strikers from unemployment relief camps climbing on boxcars in Kamloops, British Columbia

The On-to-Ottawa Trek was a mass protest movement in Canada in 1935 sparked by unrest among unemployed single men in federal relief camps principally in Western Canada. The trek started in Vancouver and, picking up reinforcements along the way, was conducted by riding railway freight cars eastward. The trek was stopped in Regina, where on July 1, 1935, police dispersed it with loss of life and mass arrests.

Federal relief camps were brought in under Prime Minister R. B. Bennett's government as a result of the Great Depression. The Great Depression crippled the Canadian economy and left one in nine citizens on relief. The relief, however, did not come free; the Bennett government ordered the Department of National Defence to organize work camps where single unemployed men were used to construct roads and other public works at a rate of twenty cents per day. The men in the relief camps were living in poor conditions with very low wages. The men decided to unite in 1933, led by Arthur "Slim" Evans, an officer of the Workers' Unity League (WUL). The Workers' Unity League helped the men organize the Relief Camp Workers' Union.

A strike was held in December 1934 with the men leaving the various camps and protesting in Vancouver, British Columbia. After a two-month protest, they returned to the camps after a promise of a government commission to look into their complaints. When a commission was not appointed, a second strike was approved by the members, and a walkout was called on April 4, 1935.

About 1,000 strikers headed for Ottawa. The strikers' demands were: "(1) that work with wages be instituted at a minimum of fifty cents per hour for unskilled workers and trade union rates for skilled labour on the basis of a six-hour day, a five-day week with a minimum of twenty work days per month; (2) that all workers in the camps be covered by the Workmen's Compensation Act and that adequate first aid supplies be carried on the jobs at all times; (3) that the National Defence and all military control with the system of blacklisting be abolished; (4) that democratically elected committees be recognized in every camp; (5) that there be instituted a system of noncontributory unemployment insurance; (6) that all workers be given their democratic right to vote; (7) that Section 98 of the Criminal Code, Sections 41 and 42 of the Immigration Act and all vagrancy laws and anti-working class laws be repealed".

Public support for the men was enormous, but the municipal, provincial, and federal governments passed responsibility between themselves. They then decided to take their grievances to the federal government. On June 3, 1935, hundreds of men began boarding boxcars headed east in what became known as the "On-to-Ottawa Trek".

== Meeting in Ottawa ==
The protesters reached Regina, Saskatchewan, on June 14, 1935. Three days later, on June 17, the protesters met with two federal cabinet ministers in the government of Prime Minister R. B. Bennett, Robert Manion and Robert Weir. Manion and Weir invited eight elected representatives of the protest (with Arthur "Slim" Evans as their leader) to Ottawa to meet Bennett on the condition the rest of the protesters stay in Regina, where a large contingent of the Royal Canadian Mounted Police was located. The remaining trekkers continued to remain in the stadium located on Regina Exhibition Grounds, "with food and shelter supplied by townspeople and the Saskatchewan government."

The June 22 Ottawa meeting turned into a shouting match, with Bennett accusing Evans of being an "embezzler". Evans, in turn, called the prime minister "a liar" before the delegation was finally escorted out of the building and on to the street.

== Regina riot ==
Regina Riot
- Part of the On-to-Ottawa Trek
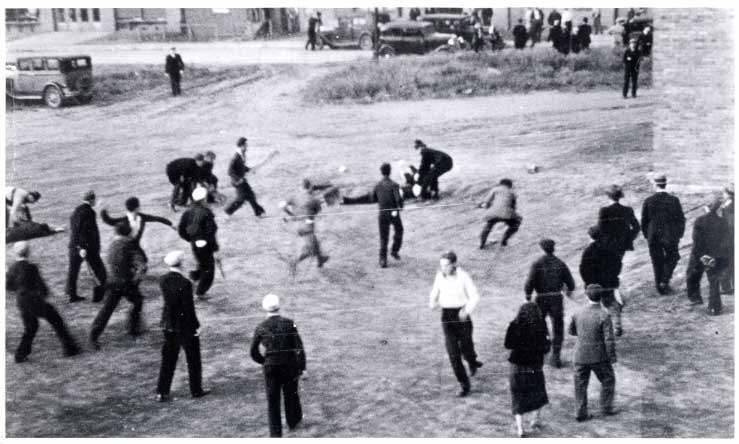
- Rioters converging on an injured man during the riot
- Date: July 1, 1935
- Location: Market Square, Regina, Saskatchewan
- Caused by: Breakdown in negotiations between Trek leaders and the Bennett government; Government crackdown on the Trekkers
- Methods: Police charge; Tear gas attack

Parties
Trekkers; Workers' Unity League; Relief Camp Workers' Union	Government of Canada; Royal Canadian Mounted Police; Supported by: Regina Police

Lead figures
Arthur Evans	R. B. Bennett; Hugh Guthrie; James MacBrien

Number
1,500 to 2,000	350

Casualties and losses
Deaths: 1; Injuries: Over 100; Arrested: 140	Deaths: 1; Injuries: 39 (confirmed)

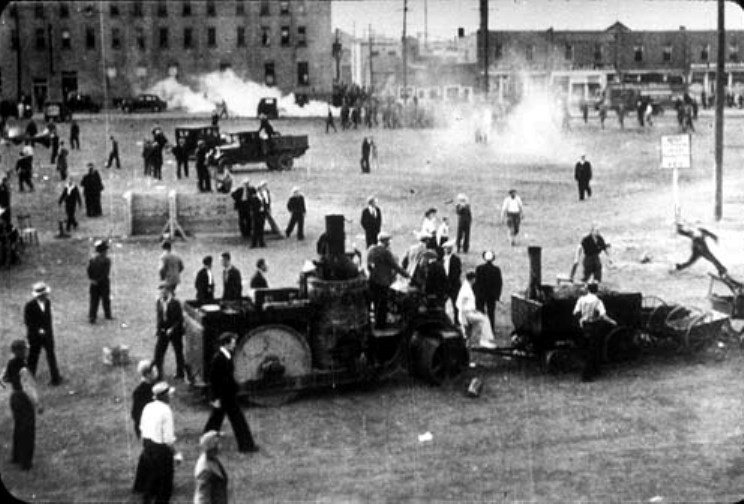
Scene from the Regina Riot

The eight delegates arrived back in Regina on June 26. Attempts of the Trekkers to travel east by car, truck or train were thwarted by RCMP. A public meeting was called for July 1 in Market Square in Germantown (now the site of the Regina Police Service station) to update the public on the progress of the movement. It was attended by 1,500 to 2,000 people, of whom only 300 were Trekkers. Most Trekkers decided to stay at the exhibition grounds in Saskatchewan.

Three large moving trucks were parked on three sides of the square concealing RCMP riot squads. Regina police were in the garage of the police station which was in Market Square. At 8:17 p.m. a whistle was blown, and the police charged the crowd with batons from all four sides. The attack caught the people off guard before their anger took over. They fought back with sticks, stones, and anything at hand. Mounted RCMP officers then started to use tear gas and fired guns. Driven from the square, and with the RCMP blocking the roadway back to the exhibition grounds, the battle continued in the surrounding streets for six hours.

Police fired revolvers above and into groups of people. Tear gas bombs were thrown at any groups that gathered together. Plate glass windows in stores and offices were smashed, but with one exception, these stores were not looted, they were burned. People covered their faces with wet handkerchiefs to counter the effects of the tear gas and barricaded streets with cars. Finally, the Trekkers who had attended the meeting made their way individually or in small groups back to the exhibition stadium where the main body of Trekkers were quartered.

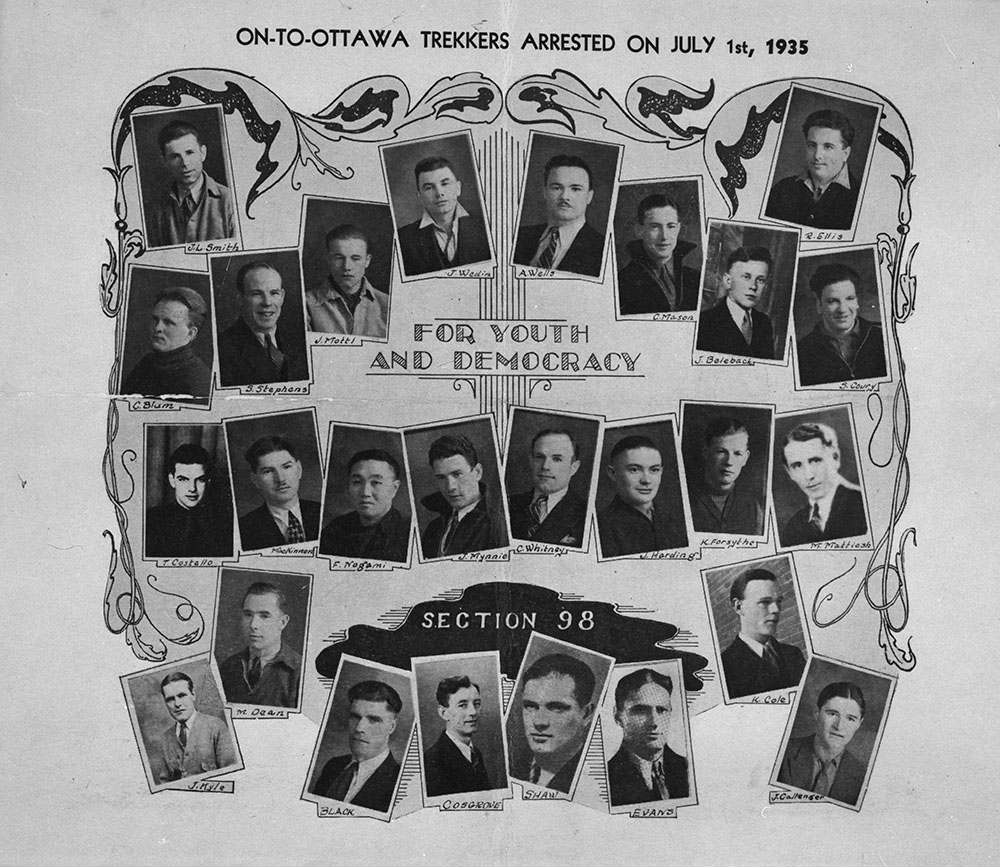
A poster made by the Communist Party of Canada, illustrating some of the participants in the On-to-Ottawa Trek who were arrested in 1935. The image also refers to Section 98 of the Criminal Code of Canada.

When it was over, 140 Trekkers and citizens had been arrested. Charles Miller, a plainclothes policeman, died, and Nick Schaack, a Trekker, later died in the hospital from injuries sustained in the riot. There were hundreds of injured residents and Trekkers were taken to hospitals or private homes. Those taken to a hospital were also arrested. Property damage was considerable. The police claimed 39 injuries in addition to the dead police officer, but denied that any protesters had been killed in the melee; the hospital records were subsequently altered to conceal the actual cause of death.

Trekkers Arthur Evans and George Black who were on the speakers' platform were arrested by plainclothes police at the beginning of the melee.

The city's exhibition grounds were surrounded by constables armed with revolvers as well as automatic fire-arms. The next day a barbed wire stockade was erected around the area. News of the police-instigated riot was front-page news across Canada. About midnight one of the Trek leaders telephoned Saskatchewan Premier James Gardiner, who agreed to meet their delegation the next morning. The RCMP were livid when they heard of this and apprehended the delegates for interrogation but eventually released them in time to see the premier.

Gardiner sent a wire to Prime Minister Bennett, accusing the police of "precipitating a riot" while he had been negotiating a settlement with the Trekkers. He also told the prime minister the "men should be fed where they are and sent back to camp and homes as they request" and stated his government was prepared to "undertake this work of disbanding the men." An agreement to this effect was subsequently negotiated. Bennett was satisfied that he had smashed what he described as a communist revolt and Gardiner was glad to rid his province of the strikers.

The Federal Minister of Justice, Hugh Guthrie, said in the House of Commons on July 2 that "shots were fired by the strikers, and the fire was replied to with shots from the city police." During the lengthy trials that followed, no evidence was ever produced to show that strikers fired shots during the riot. For his part, Bennett characterized the On-to-Ottawa Trek as "not a mere uprising against law and order but a definite revolutionary effort on the part of a group of men to usurp authority and destroy government."

== Effects ==
The Bennett government proceeded with "the prosecution of the trek leaders and those who had been charged with rioting and assault."

The events discredited Bennett's Conservative government, and in the 1935 federal election, his party dropped 20 percentage points in popularity and was thrown out of office.

After the Trek, the Saskatchewan government provided Trekkers with free transportation back to the west as a peace offering.

The federal work camps were soon dismantled and replaced by seasonal relief camps run by the provinces who paid the men slightly more for their labour than the earlier camps. Even these camps were soon closed down. Although the Trek did not reach Ottawa, its reverberations certainly did. Several demands of the Trekkers were eventually met, and the public support that galvanized behind the Trek set the tone for the social and welfare provisions of the postwar era.

== See also ==
- Canada in the world wars and interwar period
  - Great Depression in Canada
  - Canadian Cities in the Great Depression
- History of Regina, Saskatchewan
- Bonus Army
- Estevan Riot
- List of incidents of civil unrest in Canada
- Timeline of Calgary history
