= Farm Debt Mediation Act =

Canadian law

Parliament of Canada
- Long title: An Act to provide for mediation between insolvent farmers and their creditors, to amend the Agriculture and Agri-Food Administrative Monetary Penalties Act, and to repeal the Farm Debt Review Act
- Citation: SC 1997, c. 21
- Territorial extent: Canada
- Enacted by: Parliament of Canada
- Royal assent: 25 April 1997
- Commenced: 1 April 1998
- Bill citation: C-38, 35th Parliament, 2nd Session

The Farm Debt Mediation Act (French: Loi sur la médiation en matière d’endettement agricole, S.C. 1997, c. 21) ("FDMA") is an act of the Parliament of Canada that enables a debt advisory service to insolvent farmers by Agriculture and Agri-Food Canada, as well as certain protective provisions available to help facilitate mediation with creditors while allowing such farmers to continue their operations.

== Background ==
While the Farm Debt Review Act already allowed protection for farmers in financial difficulty, it was seen as being too broad in scope, where even hobby farmers could receive protection from creditors. The Act's structure of exercising authority through a network of appointed boards was also viewed as being too decentralized. In April 1997, the FDMA received Royal Assent, and it was brought into force in April 1998.

== Framework ==
=== Scope ===
In contrast to the FDRA, a farmer is defined as being any individual or entity "that is engaged in farming for commercial purposes and that meets any prescribed criteria," (Note: no prescribed criteria are currently in effect) and only insolvent farmers may apply for a financial review and mediation with all of the farmer's creditors (either with or without a stay of proceedings). As in the FDRA, "farming" included the production or raising of any animal or thing on a farm, and it was declared that:

6 Only farmers

(a) who are for any reason unable to meet their obligations as they generally become due,
(b) who have ceased paying their current obligations in the ordinary course of business as they generally become due, or
(c) the aggregate of whose property is not, at a fair valuation, sufficient, or if disposed of at a fairly conducted sale under legal process would not be sufficient, to enable payment of all their obligations, due and accruing due

are eligible to apply under section 5.

A stay of proceedings under the FDMA operates "notwithstanding any law", which has been interpreted to mean that it also suspends a petition of bankruptcy under the Bankruptcy and Insolvency Act.

=== Administration ===
In place of the former Farm Debt Review Boards, administrators are either appointed or engaged by Agriculture and Agri-Food Canada to administer the Act, (Note: there are currently no administrators that are engaged at this time, who are not part of the Public Service of Canada) and they can enter into agreements to engage mediators and experts. Where an administrator receives an application from an insolvent farmer, they must inform all the farmer's secured and unsecured creditors and (where the Minister is guarantor of any debt) the Minister, issue a stay of proceedings for 30 days where it has been requested, and (after a preliminary review of the farmer’s financial affairs) make a determination as to whether the farmer is actually eligible to make such an application.

In connection with the application:

- the administrator or appropriate expert will undertake "a detailed review of the farmer's financial affairs", which must include an inventory and financial statements of the farming operation, and may recommend that specified parties participate in a mediation, as well as the "preparation of recovery plans (Note: unless the administrator agrees to accept the farmer's choice of person for the role) for the purpose of reaching financial arrangements with creditors and the Minister."
- when the results of a review has been finalized in a report, the administrator must appoint a mediator and inform the farmer and creditors of the appointment

- in the case of a mediation arising under s. 5(1)(a) (which includes a stay of proceedings), the mediation and stay terminate when the administrator determines that either the farmer or the majority of the creditors refuse to participate in the mediation or refused to continue to participate in good faith, the mediation will not result in reaching an arrangement between the farmer and a majority of creditors, the farmer has contravened any directive issued concerning the guardianship of the assets, or where the farmer has jeopardized the assets or obstructed the guardian in the performance of his duties.
- in the case of a mediation arising under s. 5(1)(b) (which concerns only financial review and mediation), the mediation terminates when the administrator determines that either the farmer or the majority of the creditors refuse to participate in the mediation or refused to continue to participate in good faith, or the mediation will not result in reaching an arrangement between the farmer and a majority of creditors

- a stay of proceedings can be extended for a further three 30-day periods, and must be extended to the date of an appeal board's decision concerning an administrator's decision not to extend the stay (when the stay is scheduled to expire in the interim)

- when a stay has been issued, the administrator must appoint a guardian over the farmer's assets (who may be the farmer), and the administrator may issue directives to such guardian

- the minister may appoint one or more appeal boards to hear appeals from an administrator's decisions concerning a farmer's eligibility to make an application, or relating to an extension or termination of a stay of proceedings
- a farmer shall not make a new application under the Act during the two years following the previous one

=== Enforcement ===
Before enforcing any remedy against a farmer's property, or commencing any proceedings "for the recovery of a debt, the realization of any security or the taking of any property of a farmer," a secured creditor must give written notice of intention to do so, together with advising the farmer of his right to apply for a stay of proceedings, and copies must be given to the farmer and administrator at least 15 business days before doing so. The holder of a guarantee is not considered a secured creditor nor obliged to give a FDMA notice, unless that guarantor is a farmer and has provided collateral security in support of the guarantee.

Enforcement involves a complex interplay between the FDMA and other relevant statutes. In Manitoba, the process is characterized thus:

1. Initial notices of intention to realize on security must be given under the Bankruptcy and Insolvency Act, FDMA and the Personal Property Security Act (Note: with respect to the seizure of growing crops) There is debate as to whether these notices should be given concurrently or consecutively.
2. After the stay of proceedings under the FDMA has ceased to have effect, the farmer's real property may not be seized unless a separate mediation process has been completed and leave granted by the Manitoba Court of Queen’s Bench under the Family Farm Protection Act. The FFPA process cannot commence until the FDMA stay of proceedings has terminated.
3. Where farm machinery and farm equipment have been purchased from a dealer in the province, the Farm Machinery and Equipment Act provides that it cannot be repossessed by a lienholder without the approval of the Manitoba Farm Industry Board. Following repossession, the lienholder must give notice to the farmer of his action, and must hold the assets for 10 working days, in order for the purchaser to be able to settle the amount of the payments in default, together with accrued interest and other related costs.
4. A farmer cannot be petitioned into bankruptcy or have an interim receiver appointed with respect to his assets, but may opt to make an assignment in bankruptcy.

== Impact ==
The Act's mandatory requirements have been strictly interpreted by the courts. For example, it has been held that a farmer cannot waive the secured creditor's obligation to given notice of intention to enforce security, even where it has been included in a mediation agreement. However, a stay cannot affect the appointment already in effect of an interim receiver for the purposes of preserving the estate of a bankrupt for the benefit of creditors, as it is not a proceeding for the recovery of a debt.

Because the Act covers only farming operations that are operated "with a commercial purpose", the courts have devised a list of factors to consider whether such is the case:

- the debtor has dedicated most his/her land to a farming activity;
- the farming activity is entirely the result of the debtor’s efforts;
- the debtor has claimed farming losses;
- the debtor has engaged in farming activities both before and since obtaining the debt; and
- the debtor intends to make an eventual profit from the farming activity.
