= Workers' Unity League =

Workers' Unity League (WUL)
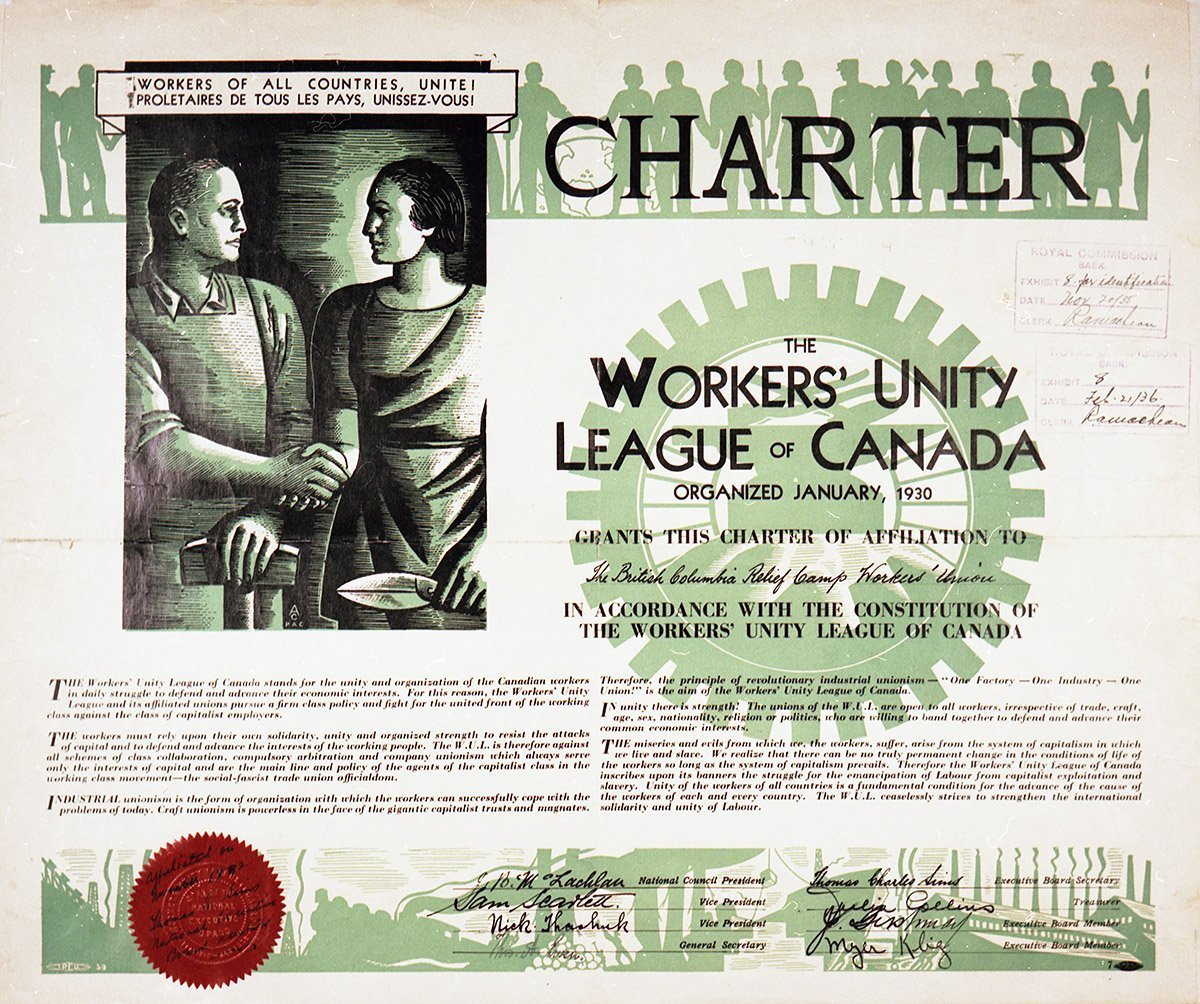
- Popular front merger: Congress of Industrial Organizations
- Founded: 1930
- Dissolved: 1935
- Location: Canada
- Members: 40,000
- Key people: J.B. McLachlan, Tom McEwen; Annie Buller; Arthur "Slim" Evans
- Affiliations: Red International of Labour Unions

The Workers' Unity League (WUL) was established in January 1930 as a militant industrial union labour central closely related to the Communist Party of Canada on the instructions of the Communist International.

This was reflective of the shift in the Communist International's political line that ushered in its "Third Period". Rather than "boring from within"—the policy of the "Second Period" that encouraged communists to join mainstream labour unions and progressive organizations in order to move them to the revolutionary left—this new line emphasized creating independent communist organizations. The WUL paralleled similar alternative trade union structures elsewhere: the Trade Union Unity League in the US, and the National Minority Movement in the UK.

Some of the unions affiliated with the WUL include the Mine Workers' Union of Canada, Lumber Workers Industrial Union of Canada and the Relief Camp Workers' Union. Unlike both the Trades and Labor Congress of Canada (TLC) and the All Canadian Congress of Labour (ACCL), the WUL organized the unemployed as well.

== History ==
=== Formation ===
The 6th World Congress of the Communist International held in summer 1928 adopted a militant political line, opposed to reformism and compromise with the moderate left. The Comintern believed global capitalism had entered a 'Third Period', which would be marked by economic collapse, leaving the working class ripe for radicalization. The Communists Party, as a Comintern member, accepted this new political line.

Communist Party member Samuel Carr returned from Moscow's Lenin School in Spring 1929, relaying the Comintern's intention for a Communist labour union centre in Canada. The Communist Party of Canada declared its intention of creating a 'red union centre' separate from the established Trades and Labor Congress of Canada during its June 1929 conference. The Workers' Unity League six months later, in January 1930.

=== Initial Struggles ===
The first action of the Workers' Unity League was a walkout in the National Steel Car Company factory in Hamilton, Ontario. Led by YCL member Harvey Murphey, 1200 workers walked off the job, most of them Finnish immigrants. Although members of Hamilton's Trades and Labour Council (HTLC) were initially sympathetic, the aggressive communist rhetoric scared the moderates on the council. A delegation of the strikes who came to the HTLC to ask for support and resources were turned away and denounced for their "nerve and effrontery."

The strikes then appealed to the Finnish Organization of Canada, which had been supportive of labour in the past. The Finnish Organization of Canada ignored their appeals. 300 of the 1200 workers maintained the strike for a full 6 weeks before it ended in defeat for the workers.

The failure of the strike was a major setback for the Workers' Unity League. The WUL faced failures in organizing miners in Alberta and Nova Scotia. A major difficulty faced by the WUL was that the depression made jobs hard to come by, and although conditions were bad, organizing with a union ran the risk of losing what little they had. Additionally, many workers were wary of communism- a fact only bolstered by the WUL's portrayal as a Soviet puppet in the media.

In spite of this, the WUL found success in organizing unemployed workers, led by Arthur "Slim" Evans. Unemployed workers were usually a hindrance to organized labor -striking workers were often replaced by the unemployed, who were willing to work for less- but the WUL organization brought them into the labour movements fold, and instead of crossing picket lines, unemployed workers joined them.

=== Growth and Militancy ===
In 1931, the WUL had less than 7,000 members. By 1932, this had more than doubled to 15,000 workers. Between 1929 and 1932, the TLC' membership fell by 25%, from 141,000 to 105,000. At its peak in 1935, the Workers' Unity League had over 40,000 members. The WUL's willingness to organize sectors previously considered organizable was a major factor in its growth.

The WUL, despite being smaller than the TLC and All-Canadian Congress of Labour, started 90% of strikes in Canada between 1933 and 1936. In 1933, 181 of the 233 strikes in Canada was led by the WUL and it won 111 of the strikes.

The Workers' Unity League was the most active labour union of its time, and was distinguished for its willingness to strike. Sam Scarlet, veteran union organizer and member of the Industrial Workers of the World, said that the WUL was the "only home for a serious class fighter".

1933 and 1934 saw the most bitter and numerous strikes since 1920. The Workers' Unity League affiliated unions represented 71% of the striker days during this period of time, and despite representing a minority of workers, half of all strikers were members and a majority of strikes were carried out by it. This includes the bloody walkout by Estevan, Saskatchewan miners in which the police killed three strikers, and the strike of furniture workers and chicken pluckers in Stratford, Ontario which was put down by calling in the Canadian army.

The WUL provided a solid base for growth of the Communist Party, with membership growing from 1,300 in 1930 to over 9,000 in 1935.

=== Popular Front Merger ===
In 1935, international developments changed the strategy of the Communist International. The rise of fascism in Europe urged Stalin to call for a Popular Front of Communists and non-Communists against the extreme right wing. Following the Popular Front strategy, the Worker's Unity League merged into the Congress of Industrial Organizations, a faction within the TLC. Many Communists such as Henry Segal, Fred Collins, and Leo Sax gained executive posts in the C.I.O. Following the Comintern line of 'unity for a price', many WUL industrial unions were liquidated and its members distributed among the TLC affiliated craft unions. For example, the red union of Food Workers was dissolved into the respective TLC affiliated bakers', teamsters', and hotel and restaurant employees' unions.

In 1938, the CIO was expelled from the TLC, being accused of communist sympathies. A new union central, the Canadian Congress of Labour (CCL) was founded by the expelled unions. Leading Communists were expelled form the new union, and Communist influence over the labour movement began to wane in favour of the Co-operative Commonwealth Federation. The CCL merged with the TLC in 1956, forming the current Canadian Labour Congress (CLC).

== See also ==
- Estevan Riot
- On to Ottawa Trek
- 1933 Stratford, Ontario general strike

== Works cited ==
- Khouri, Malek (2007). Filming Politics: Communism and the Portrayal of the Working Class at the National Film Board of Canada, 1939-46. University of Calgary Press. ISBN 9781552381991.
