= Truman (surname) =

Truman is a surname of English origin. Notable people with the name include:

- Sir Benjamin Truman (1700–1780), English entrepreneur and brewer
- Benjamin C. Truman (1835–1916), American journalist and author
- Bess Truman (1885–1982), wife of President Truman
- Charles Truman (1949–2017), British art historian and curator
- Christine Truman (born 1941), British tennis player
- David Truman (1913–2003), American academic
- Edwin M. Truman (born 1941), American economist
- Harry Truman (disambiguation)
  - Harry R. Truman (1896–1980), American victim of the 1980 eruption of Mount St. Helens
  - Harry S. Truman (1884–1972), 33rd U.S. president
- James Truman (disambiguation)
  - James S. Truman (1874–1957), New York state senator
- Joseph Truman (born 1997), British sportsperson
- Louis Truman (1908–2004), American general
- Lyman Truman (1806–1881), New York state senator
- Margaret Truman (1924–2008), American writer, daughter of President Truman
- Michael Truman (1916–1972), British film producer
- Ralph Truman (1900–1977), British actor
- Timothy Truman (born 1956), American writer

== Fictional characters ==
- Will Truman, fictional character in the television series Will and Grace
- Scott Truman, fictional character in the television series Power Rangers RPM

== See also ==
- Senator Truman (disambiguation)
- Trueman, surname
- Truman (given name)
