= Truman =

Truman may refer to:

== People ==
- Truman (surname)
  - Harry S. Truman (1884–1972), 33rd U.S. president
- Truman (given name)
  - Truman Capote (1924–1984), American writer and actor

== Media ==
- Truman (book), a biography of Harry S. Truman by David McCullough
- Truman (1995 film), a film based on the book by McCullough
- The Truman Show, an American film by Peter Weir
- Truman (2015 film), a Spanish-Argentine film
- "Truman", a song by Stray Kids from single album Mixtape: Dominate, 2025

== Places in the United States ==
- Truman, Minnesota, a city
- Truman, Pennsylvania, an unincorporated community
- Truman, Wisconsin, an unincorporated community

== Other uses ==
- Truman's Brewery, a former London's famous brewery closed in 1989
- Truman High School (disambiguation)
- Truman Sports Complex, Kansas City, Missouri, USA
- Truman State University, Missouri, USA
  - Truman Bulldogs, this university's athletic program
- USS Harry S. Truman (CVN-75)
- The Truth about Truman School, a 2008 children's book by Dori Hillestad Butler
- Truman House (disambiguation)

== See also ==
- Turman
- Trumann, Arkansas
