= History of Vancouver =

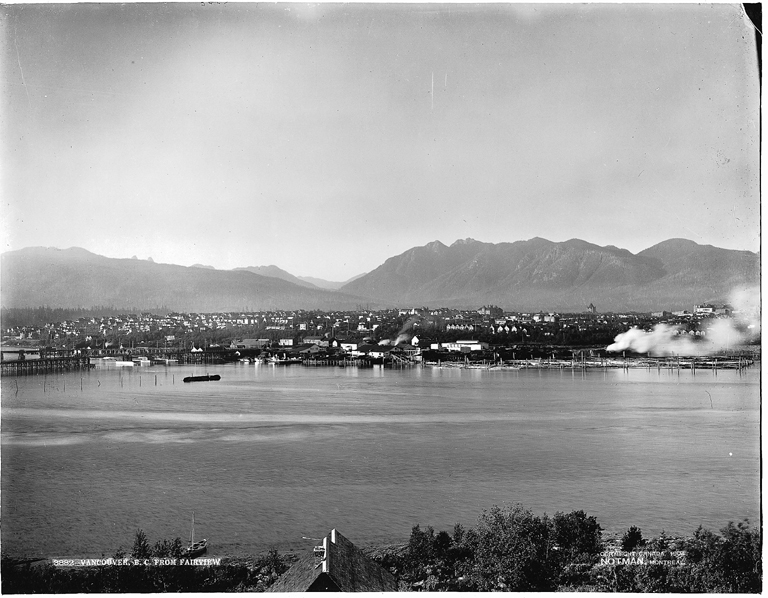
View of Downtown Vancouver from Fairview in 1904

The history of Vancouver, British Columbia, Canada, extends back thousands of years, with its first inhabitants arriving in the area following the Last Glacial Period. With its location on the western coast of Canada near the mouth of the Fraser River and on the waterways of the Strait of Georgia, Howe Sound, Burrard Inlet, and their tributaries, Vancouver has – for thousands of years – been a place of meeting, trade, and settlement.

The presence of people in what is now called the Lower Mainland dates from 8,000 to 10,000 years ago, when the glaciers of the last ice age began to disappear. The area, known to local First Nations as S'ólh Téméxw in Halkomelem, shows archeological evidence of a seasonal encampment (the Glenrose Cannery site) near the mouth of the Fraser River that dates from that time.

The first Europeans to explore the area were Spanish Captain José María Narváez in 1791 and British naval Captain George Vancouver in 1792. The area was not settled by Europeans until almost a century later, in 1862. The city grew rapidly following the completion of the Canadian Pacific Railway (CPR) transcontinental line from Eastern Canada, allowing for continuous rail service in the late 1880s. Many Chinese settlers moved into the region following the completion of the CPR. Subsequent waves of immigration were initially of Europeans moving west, and later, with the advent of global air travel, from Asia and many other parts of the world.

== Early history ==
=== First Nations settlements ===
The Indigenous peoples of the Pacific Northwest Coast are the original inhabitants of what is now known as Vancouver. The city falls within the traditional territories of three Coast Salish peoples: the Musqueam, Squamish (Sḵwxwú7mesh), and Tsleil-waututh. On the southern shores of Vancouver along the Fraser River, the Musqueam live with their main community. In the False Creek and Burrard Inlet area, the Squamish live in numerous villages in North Vancouver, with their territory also a part of Howe Sound and upwards towards the town of Whistler. Further down the Burrard Inlet, the Tsleil-Waututh have their main community. The Musqueam and Tsleil-Waututh historically spoke a language dialect of the Halkomelem language (i.e. Hunʼqumiʼnum, or the "downriver dialect"), whereas the Squamish language is separate but related. Their language is more closely connected to their Shishalh neighbours at Sechelt. Historically, the area where Vancouver is now was a resource-gathering place for food and materials.

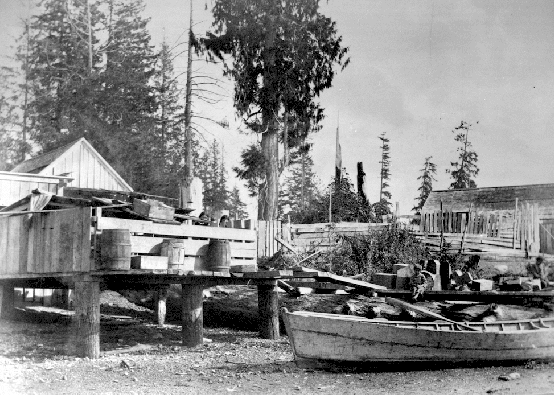
An indigenous village at Coal Harbour in 1886. Vancouver fell within the traditional territory of three Coast Salish peoples.

The Musqueam have been living continuously at their main winter village, Musqueam, at the mouth of the Fraser River, for 4,000 years. Vancouver's ecosystem, with its abundant plant and animal life, provides a wealth of food and materials that have supported the people for over 10,000 years. At the time of first European contact, the recently arrived Squamish people had villages in the areas around present-day Vancouver in places like Stanley Park, Kitsilano and False Creek area, as well as Burrard Inlet. Tsleil-Waututh were said to also be settled on Burrard Inlet at the time of George Vancouver's arrival in 1792. The largest villages were at Xwemelch'stn (sometimes rendered Homulchesan), near the mouth of the Capilano River and roughly beneath where the north foot of the present Lions Gate Bridge is today, and at Musqueam. X̱wáýx̱way was a large village in Stanley Park (in the Lumberman's Arch area). The foundation of a Catholic mission at the village, called Eslha7an, near Mosquito Creek engendered the creation of another large community of Squamish there. Along False Creek, at the south foot of Burrard Bridge, another village called Senakw, existed at one time as a large community, and during colonization was the residence of Squamish historian August Jack Khatsahlano.

The Indigenous peoples of the Northwest Coast had achieved a very high level of cultural complexity for a food gathering base. As Bruce Macdonald notes in Vancouver: a visual history: "Their economic system encouraged hard work, the accumulation of wealth and status and the redistribution of wealth ..." Winter villages, in what is now known as Vancouver, were composed of large plank houses made of Western Red Cedar wood. Gatherings called potlatches were common in the summer and winter months when the spirit powers were active. These ceremonies continue to be an important part of the social and spiritual life of the people.

=== European exploration ===
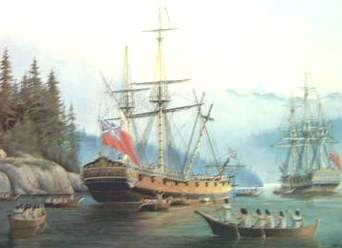
HMS Discovery was the lead ship used by George Vancouver. In 1792, his expedition charted several points and inlets, including Point Grey and Burrard Inlet.

Spanish Captain José María Narváez was the first European to explore the Strait of Georgia in 1791. In the following year, 1792, the British naval Captain George Vancouver (1757–1798) met the Spanish expedition of Dionisio Alcalá Galiano and Cayetano Valdés y Flores off Point Grey, and together further explored the Strait of Georgia. Vancouver also explored Puget Sound in the present day Seattle area. Vancouver, surveying in small boats with his officer Peter Puget, arrived at the present city of Vancouver before the Spanish. They first landed at what Vancouver later named Point Grey. Puget informally called the place Noon Breakfast Point. Puget's name was officially given to the southwest tip of Point Grey in 1981. Simon Fraser was the first European to reach the area overland, descending the river which bears his name in 1808.

Despite the influx of Europeans during the Fraser Gold Rush in 1858–59, the settlement on Burrard Inlet and English Bay was almost unknown prior to the early 1860s due in large part to the lack of interest in the area as access to the British Columbia interior was via the City of New Westminster and the Fraser River, and also due to the power of the Squamish chiefs over the area. Robert Burnaby and Moberly camped and prospected for coal in what is now Coal Harbour in the summer of 1859. They had an amicable relationship with the First Nations of the area. Robert Burnaby wrote to his family, "our [spare] time has been occupied in exploring all the ins and outs of this Inlet, which I prophesy will become one of the greatest naval rendezvous and centres of commerce on this side of the world."

== European settlement and growth ==
The first non-Indigenous settlement in the city limits of Vancouver was built around 1862 at McCleery's Farm, in the vicinity of what is now the Southlands area.

Lumbering was the early industry along Burrard Inlet, now the site of Vancouver's seaport. The first sawmill began operating in 1863 at Moodyville, a planned settlement built by American lumber entrepreneur Sewell "Sue" Moody. In 1915, it expanded as a municipality and was renamed "North Vancouver"; the name Moodyville still applies to the Lower Lonsdale district, though more as a marketing term than in common usage (Moodyville proper was a few blocks to the east). The first export of lumber took place in 1865; this lumber was shipped to Australia. In 1867, Stamp's Mill, the first sawmill on the south shore of Burrard Inlet located in the Squamish village of K'emk'emeláy, began producing lumber at what is now the foot of Dunlevy Avenue in Vancouver. A site for the mill was originally planned at Brockton Point in what is now Stanley Park, but the Brockton Point site proved infeasible due to nearby currents and shoals which made docking difficult. The largest trees in the world grew along the south shores of False Creek and English Bay and provided (amongst other things) masts for the world's windjammer fleets and the increasingly large vessels of the Royal Navy. Millworkers and lumberers were from a wide variety of backgrounds – mostly Scandinavians and Nootkas – who were also brought to the inlet to help with the local whaling industry. At first, Squamish typically did not work in the mills.

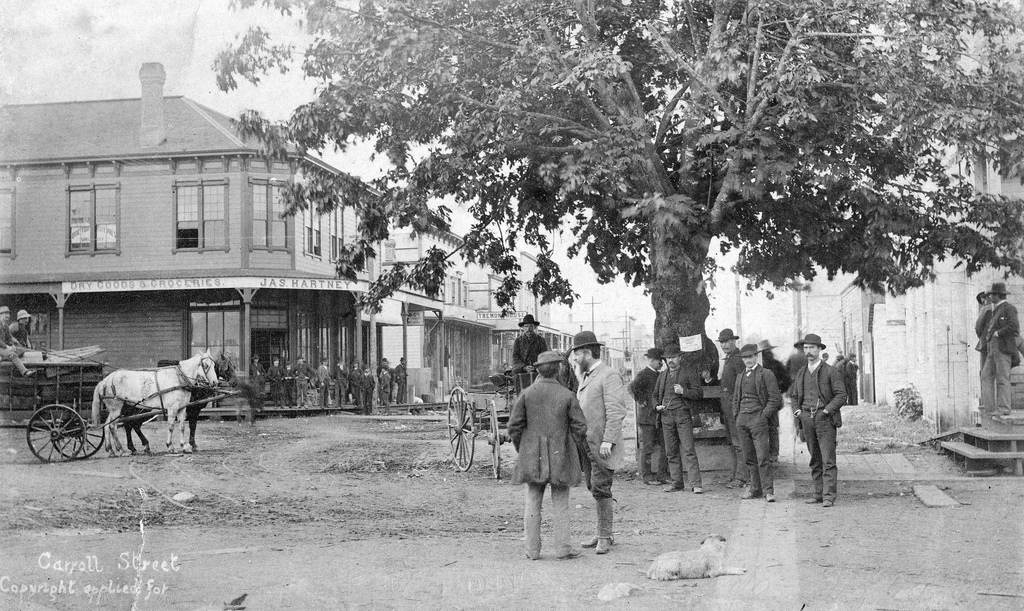
View of Gastown from Carrall and Water Street in 1886. Named after Gassy Jack, Gastown was Vancouver's first downtown core.

A former river pilot, John "Jack" Deighton, set up a small (24' x 12') saloon on the beach about a mile west of the sawmill in 1867 where mill property and its "dry" policies ended. His place was popular and a well-worn trail between the mill and saloon was soon established – this is today's Alexander Street. Deighton's nickname, "Gassy Jack", came about because he was known to be quite talkative, or "gassy". A number of men began living near the saloon and the "settlement" quickly became known as Gassy's Town, which was quickly shortened to "Gastown". In 1870, the colonial government of British Columbia took notice of the growing settlement and sent a surveyor to lay out an official townsite named Granville, in honour of the British Colonial Secretary, Lord Granville, though it was still popularly known as Gastown (which is the name still current for that part of the city).

The new townsite was situated on a natural harbour, and for this reason it was selected by the Canadian Pacific Railway as their terminus. The transcontinental railway was commissioned by the government of Canada under the leadership of Prime Minister Sir John A. Macdonald and was a condition of British Columbia joining the confederation in 1871. The CPR president, William Van Horne, believed that Granville was not a good name for the new terminus because of the seedy associations with Gastown, and strongly suggested "Vancouver" would be a better name, in part because people in Toronto and Montreal knew where Vancouver Island was but had no idea of where Granville was.

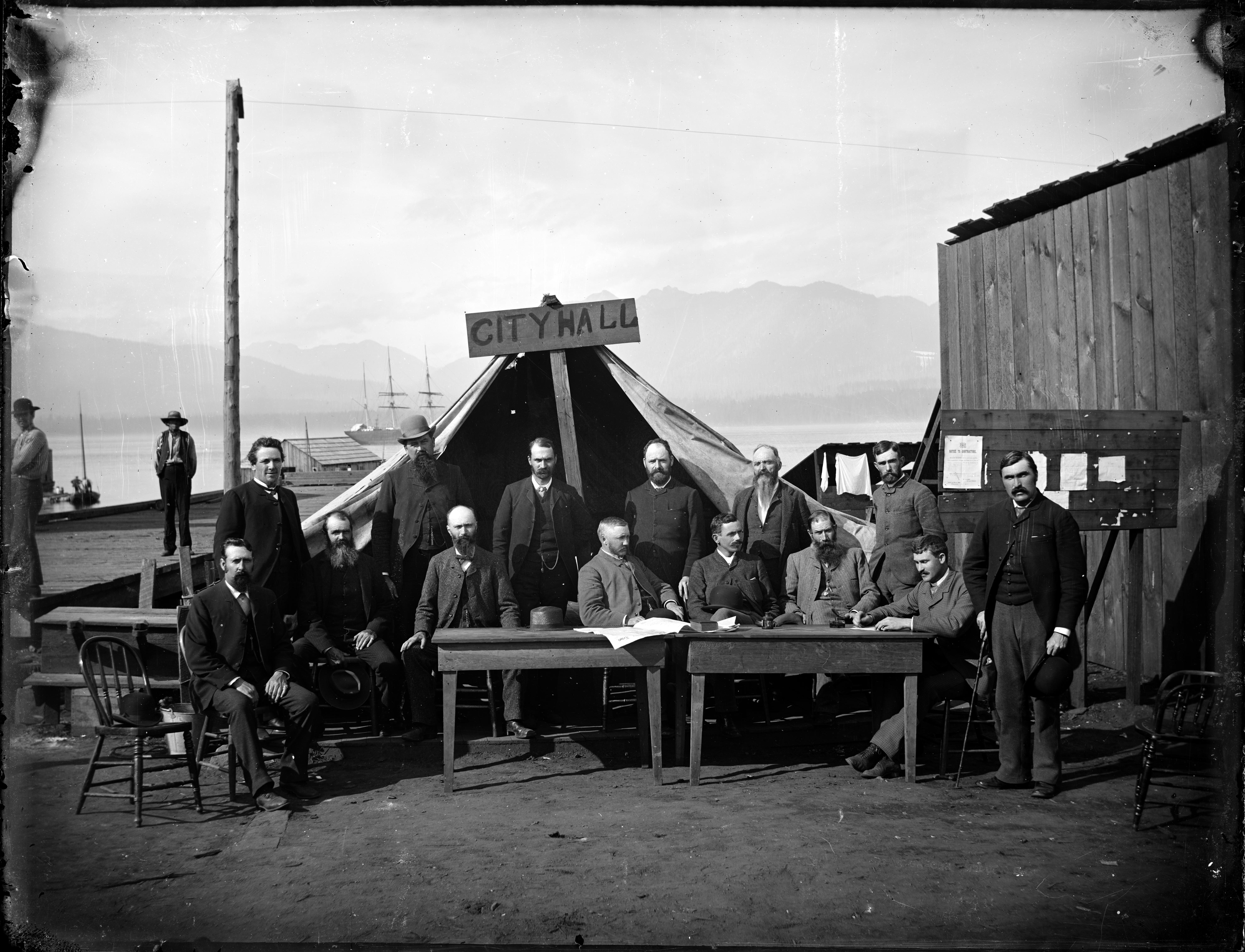
The first city council meeting after the Great Vancouver Fire in 1886

Under its new name, the city was incorporated on April 6, 1886. Two months later, on June 13, a large blaze that came to be known as the Great Vancouver Fire destroyed most of the city along the swampy shores of Burrard Inlet in 25 minutes. The tragedy ironically led to positive consequences on the city, as Vancouver was rebuilt with modern water, electricity and streetcar systems. The city recovered quickly after the fire, although celebratory Dominion Day festivities to launch the opening of the CPR were postponed a year as a result. The first regular transcontinental train from Montreal, Quebec, arrived at a temporary terminus at Port Moody, British Columbia, in July 1886, and service to Vancouver itself began in May 1887. That year Vancouver's population was 1,000; by 1891 it reached 14,000 and by 1901 it was 26,000. The population increased to 120,000 by 1911.

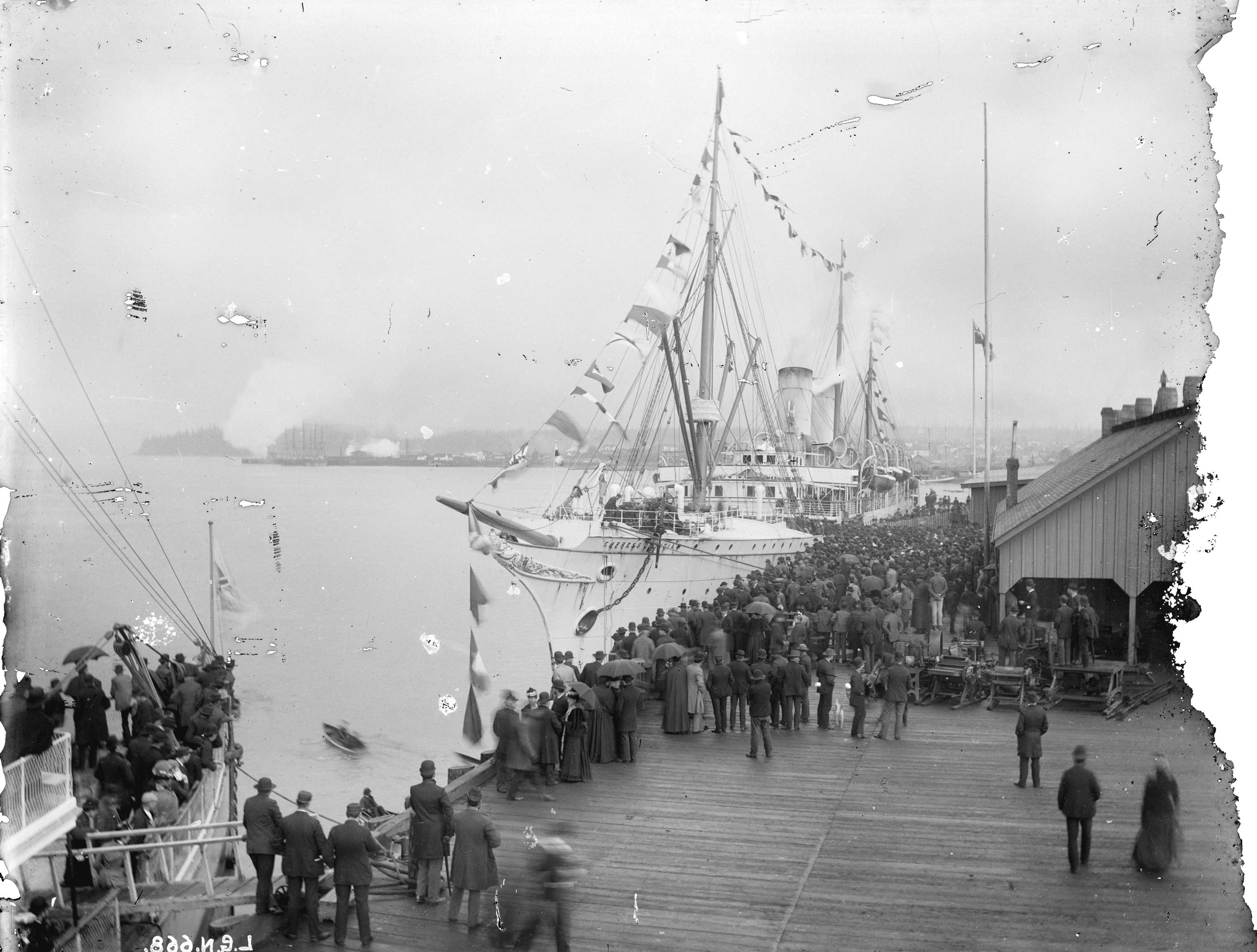
RMS Empress of India at the Port of Vancouver, 1891

The Port of Vancouver became internationally significant as a result of its key position in the All-Red Route, which spanned the global trade network of the British Empire, with the combined steamship and railway of the CPR shortening shipping times from the Orient to London drastically, and the new city becoming a node for major speculative investment by British and German capital. The completion of the Panama Canal initially reduced Vancouver's shipping traffic by becoming the new preferred route from Asia to Europe; however, reduced freight rates in the 1920s made it viable to ship even Europe-bound prairie grain west through Vancouver in addition to grains that already shipped to parts of Asia.

== Early 20th century ==
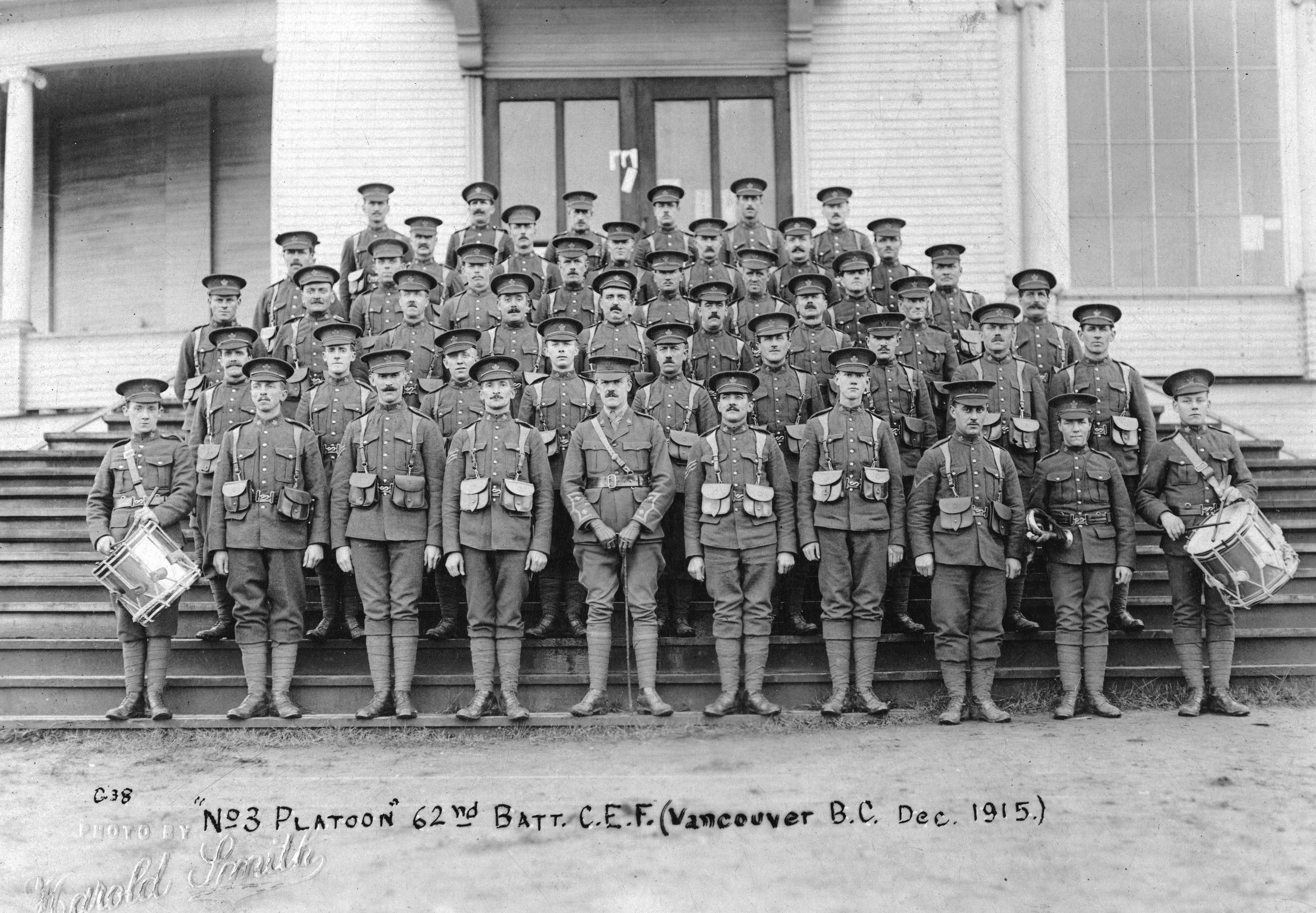
Men of the 62nd Battalion of the Canadian Expeditionary Force in Vancouver, December 1915

=== Economy ===
With the opening of the Panama Canal in 1914, Vancouver's seaport was able to compete with the major international ports for global trade because it was positioned as an alternative route to Europe. During the 1920s, the provincial government successfully fought to have freight rates that discriminated against goods transported by rail through the mountains eliminated, giving the young lawyer of the case, Gerry McGeer, a reputation as "the man who flattened the Rockies". Consequently, prairie wheat came west through Vancouver rather than being shipped out through eastern ports. The federal government established the Vancouver Harbour Commission development. With its completion in 1923, Ballantyne Pier was the most technologically advanced port in the British Empire.

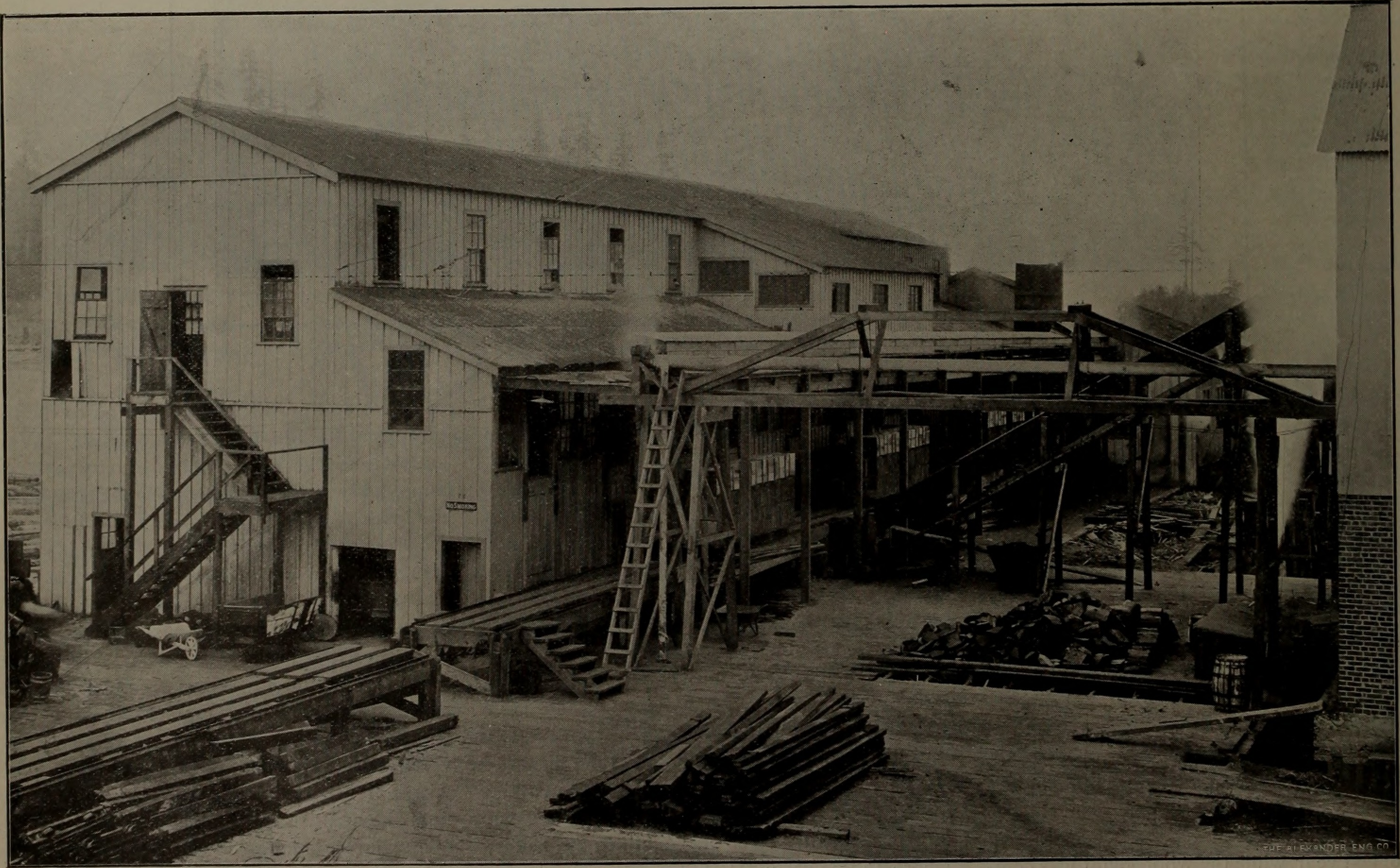
A sawmill in Vancouver, 1903

The CPR, lumber exporters, terminal operators, and other companies based on the waterfront banded together after World War I to establish the Shipping Federation of British Columbia as an employers’ association to manage industrial relations on the increasingly busy waterfront. The Federation fought vociferously against unionization, defeating a series of strikes and breaking unions until the determined longshoremen established the International Longshore and Warehouse Union local after World War II. By the 1930s, commercial traffic through the port had become the largest sector in Vancouver's economy.

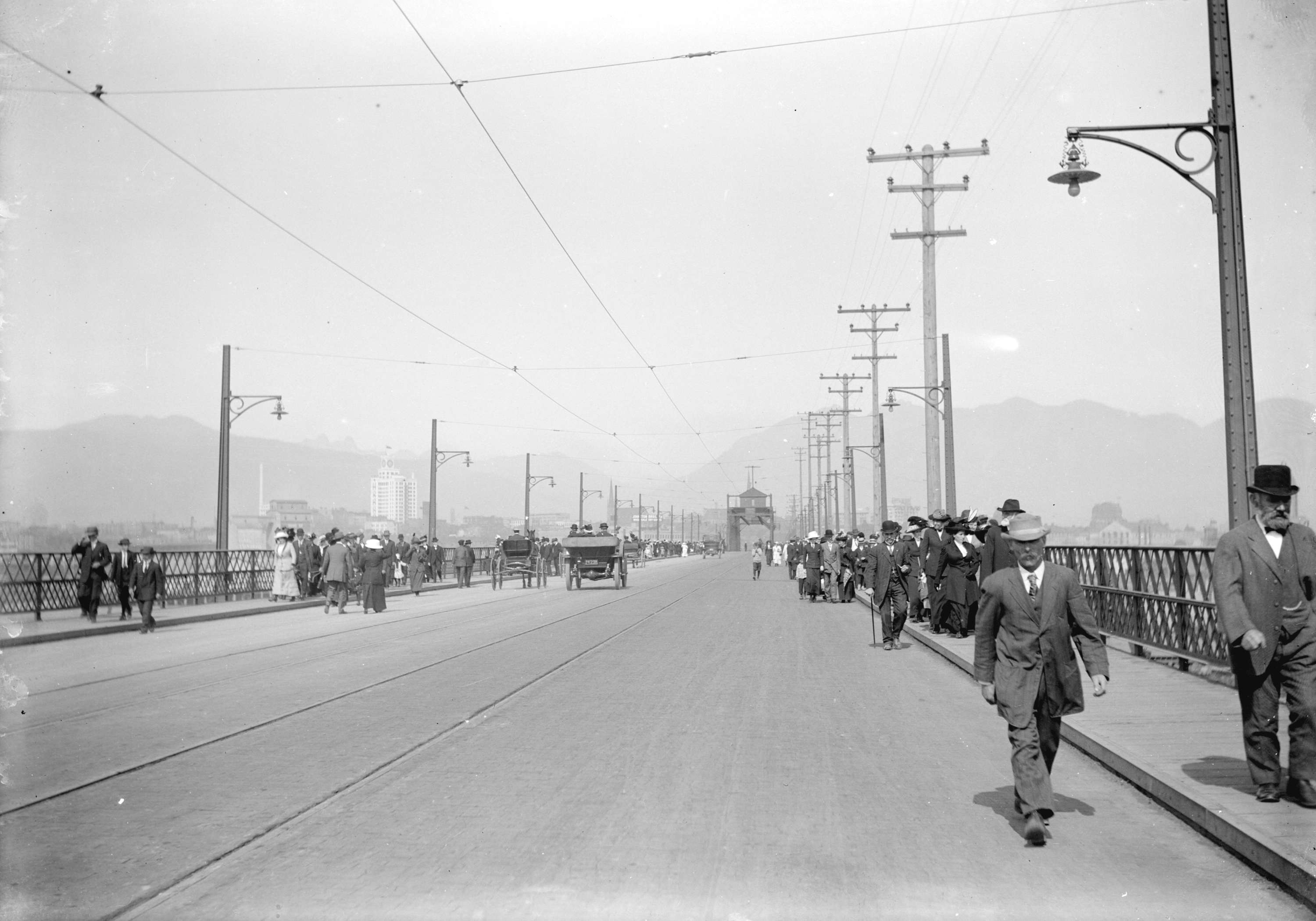
Connaught Bridge shortly after its completion in 1911. The rise of automobiles led to the construction of new bridges that could accommodate vehicles over False Creek.

The rapid growth in automobiles and trucks after 1910 led to the construction of new bridges over False Creek, including the Granville Street Bridge (built 1889, rebuilt 1954), the Burrard Bridge (built 1932), and the Cambie Bridge (built 1912, rebuilt 1984). Auto traffic to North Vancouver was facilitated with the construction of the first Second Narrows Bridge in 1925 and by the completion of the Lion's Gate Bridge in 1938, across the First Narrows. In 1923, Warren Harding became the first US president to set foot in Canada. He received by the premier of British Columbia and the mayor of Vancouver and spoke to a crowd of 50,000 in Stanley Park. A monument to Harding designed by Charles Marega was unveiled in Stanley Park in 1925.

=== Labour disputes ===
Although the provincial resource-based economy allowed Vancouver to flourish, it was nonetheless not immune to the vagaries of organized labour. Two general strikes were launched by labour groups during the years following World War II, including Canada's first general strike following the death of a trade unionist, Albert Goodwin. Major recessions and depressions hit the city hard in the late 1890s, 1919, 1923, and 1929.

==== Great Depression ====
British Columbia was perhaps the Canadian province hit hardest by the Great Depression. Although Vancouver managed to stave off bankruptcy, other cities in the Lower Mainland were not so lucky, such as North Vancouver and Burnaby. Vancouver also happened to be the target destination for thousands of transients – unemployed young men – who travelled across Canada looking for work, often by hopping on boxcars. This was the end of the line and had for years been a "mecca of the unemployed" because, as some cynically joked, it was the only city in Canada where you could starve to death before freezing to death. "Hobo jungles" sprouted up in the earliest days of the depression, where men built makeshift shanty towns out of whatever they could find or steal. The largest of these was shut down allegedly for being unsanitary.

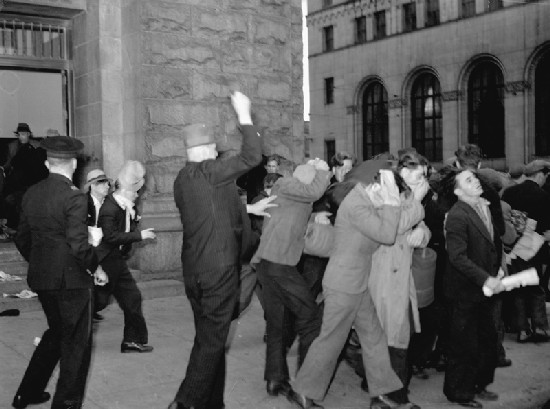
Plainclothes RCMP officers attack Relief Camp Workers' Union protesters in 1938. Several protests over unemployment occurred in the city during the Great Depression.

Vancouver was also the launching pad for the Communist Party of Canada–led unemployed protests that frequented the city throughout the decade, culminating in the relief camp strike and the On-to-Ottawa Trek in 1935. Communist agitators and their supporters also led strikes in other industries, most notably the 1935 waterfront strike, and organized a large proportion of the Mackenzie–Papineau Battalion from Vancouver to fight fascism in the Spanish Civil War as Canada's (unofficial) contribution to the International Brigades.

=== Asian immigrants ===
Economic hard times fuelled social tensions. In particular, members of the new and growing Asian population were subjected to discrimination as well as periodic upsurges of more physical objections to their arrival.

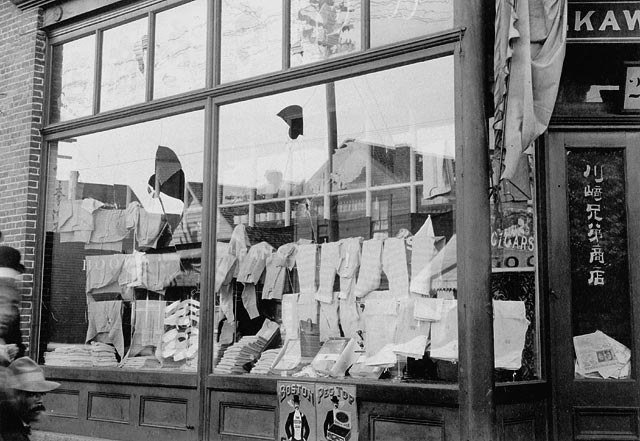
Damage after the 1907 anti-Asian riots in Vancouver

The most overt expression of this came in the 1907 riots organized by the Asiatic Exclusion League, a group formed under organized labour and inspired by its counterpart in San Francisco.

Some politicians and publicists promoted and disseminated controversial ideologies through popular books such as H. Glynn-Ward's 1921 The Writing on the Wall and Tom MacInnes’s 1929 The Oriental Occupation of British Columbia. Newspapermen such as L. D. Taylor of the Vancouver World and General Victor Odlum of the Star generated a glut of editorials analyzing and warning about the "Oriental menace", as did Danger: The Anti-Asiatic Weekly.

This determination of European settlers to secure British Columbia as a "White Man's Province" influenced federal politicians to pass immigration laws such as the head tax and the Chinese Exclusion Act. What may be called a "climate of fear and hysteria" in the 1920s culminated in the "Janet Smith case", in which a Chinese national was accused of killing his young, white, female co-worker. The evidence for his guilt was perhaps based more on stereotyping than facts.

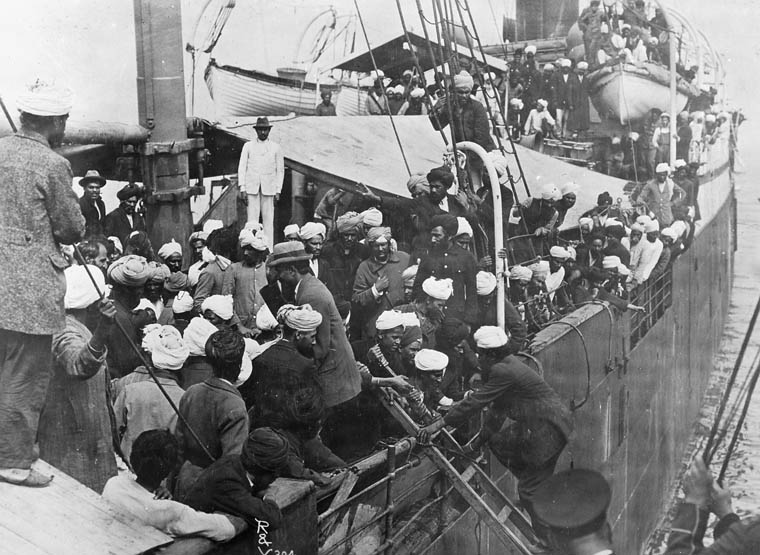
Passengers aboard the Komagata Maru in 1914 during an incident that resulted in Indian migrants being denied entry after they arrived to Vancouver.

A growing population of Indians, primarily from the province of Punjab and of the Sikh religion, were also required to abide by immigration laws starting in 1908, despite the fact that they were subjects of the British Empire. This culminated in the 1914 Komagata Maru incident, in which most of 376 immigrants on the Komagata Maru, most of them from Punjab, were not permitted to disembark because they had not complied with immigration laws that required that they come by a continuous passage from their home country.

A group of residents of Indian origin rallied in support of the passengers. After losing a court challenge of the immigration laws, the ship remained in Burrard Inlet while negotiations continued concerning its departure. When negotiations dragged on, the head immigration officer in Vancouver arranged an attempt by the Vancouver police and other officials to board the ship, who were repelled by what the Vancouver Sun reported as "howling masses of Hindus". Subsequently, the federal government sent a naval ship and after concessions made by the federal Minister of Agriculture, an MP from Penticton, the ship departed. After returning to India, twenty of the passengers were shot by police in an incident after they refused to return to Punjab.

=== Vice and politics ===
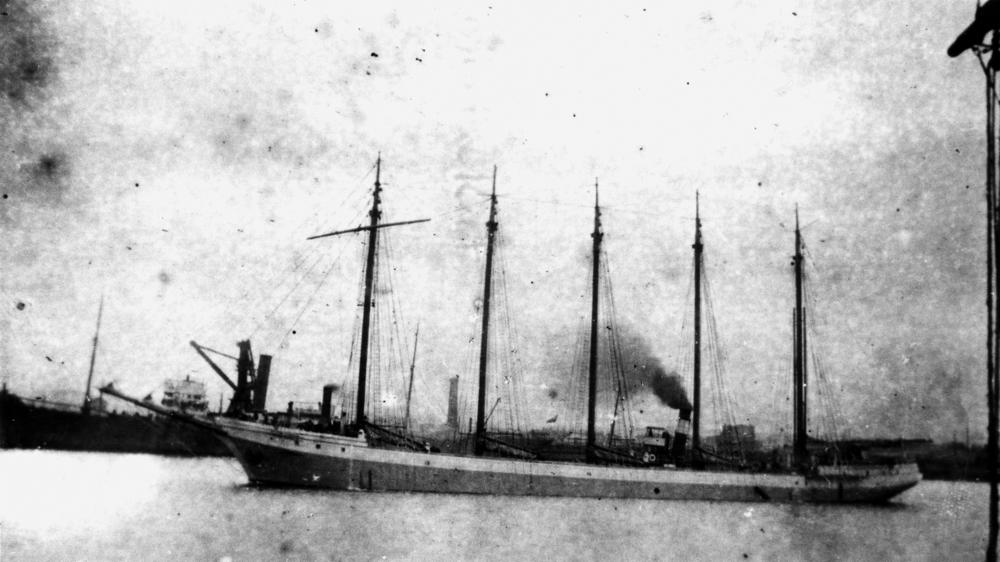
The Malahat was a rum-rummer that used Vancouver as its home port during the Prohibition Era of the neighbouring United States.

Vancouver, was also the home port of the 75-metre (246 ft) Malahat, a five-masted schooner known as the "Queen of Rum Row", maintained an active liquor trade throughout the Prohibition Era of the neighbouring United States, despite efforts to bring prohibition to Canada.

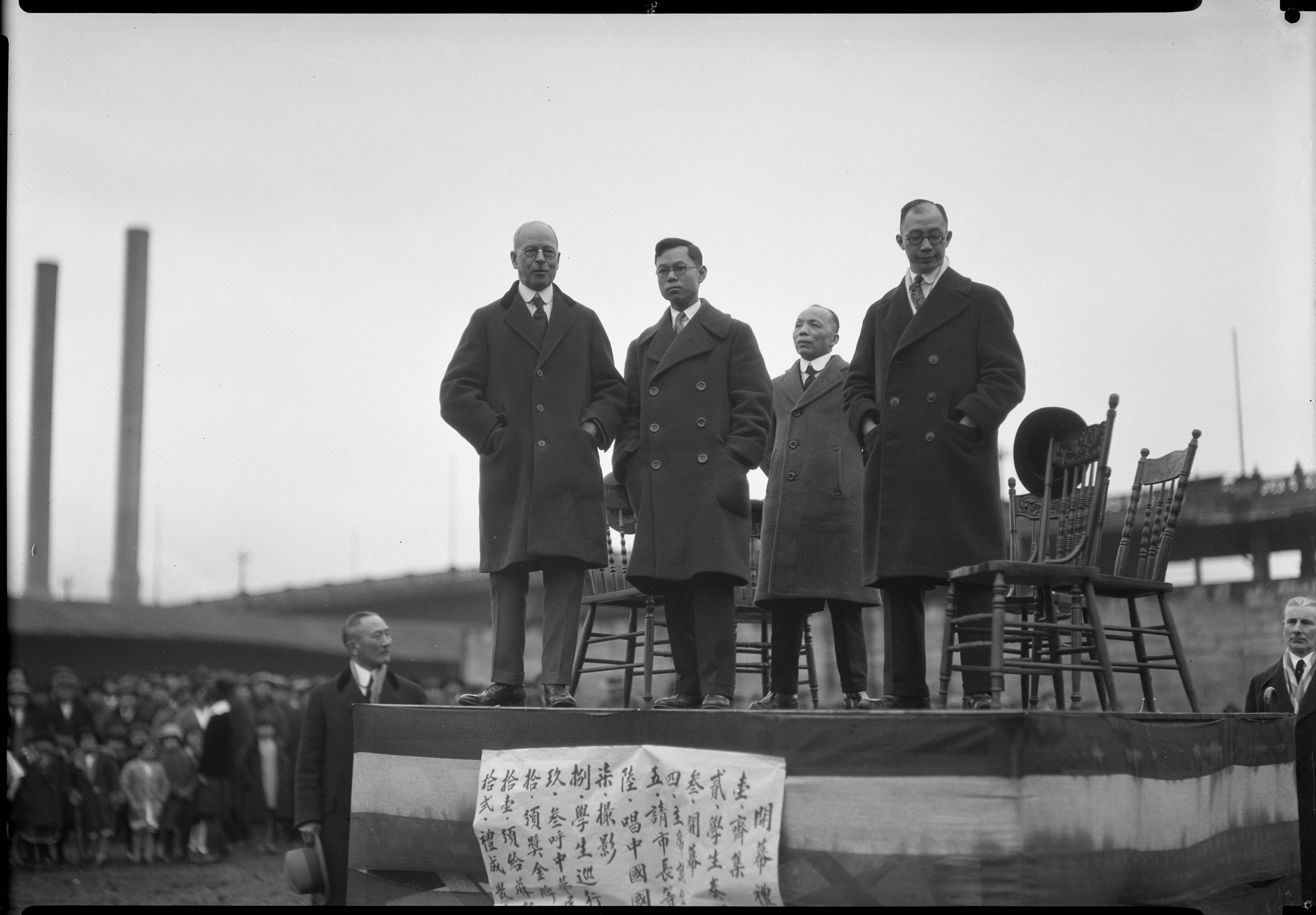
Mayor L. D. Taylor opening a playground in Chinatown, Vancouver

Vancouver's longest serving and most often elected mayor, L. D. Taylor, followed an "open town" policy prior to his final defeat in 1934 to Gerry McGeer. Essentially, the policy was that vice crimes such as prostitution, gambling, and bootlegging would be managed, rather than eliminated, so that police resources could be directed towards major crime.

A consequence of this, in addition to assumptions that Taylor was colluding with the criminal underworld, was the maintenance of red light districts in racialized neighbourhoods, such as Chinatown, Japantown, and Hogan's Alley, which perpetuated the association of non-whites with immorality and vice crime. Taylor suffered the biggest electoral defeat the city had seen in 1934, largely on this issue. McGeer ran on a law and order platform, resulting in a crackdown on vice crimes, which, after years of Taylor's "open town" policy, sought to clean up crime. Unfortunately, policing non-white communities was key to successfully executing the plan. Even the East End (today's Strathcona) had by World War I been largely vacated by English, Scottish, and Irish residents who moved to the wealthier (and whiter) new developments of the West End and Shaughnessy. The East End, the original residential district that grew up around Hasting's Mill, was left to successive waves of new immigrants, and became associated with poverty and vice.

=== Neighbourhood and property development ===
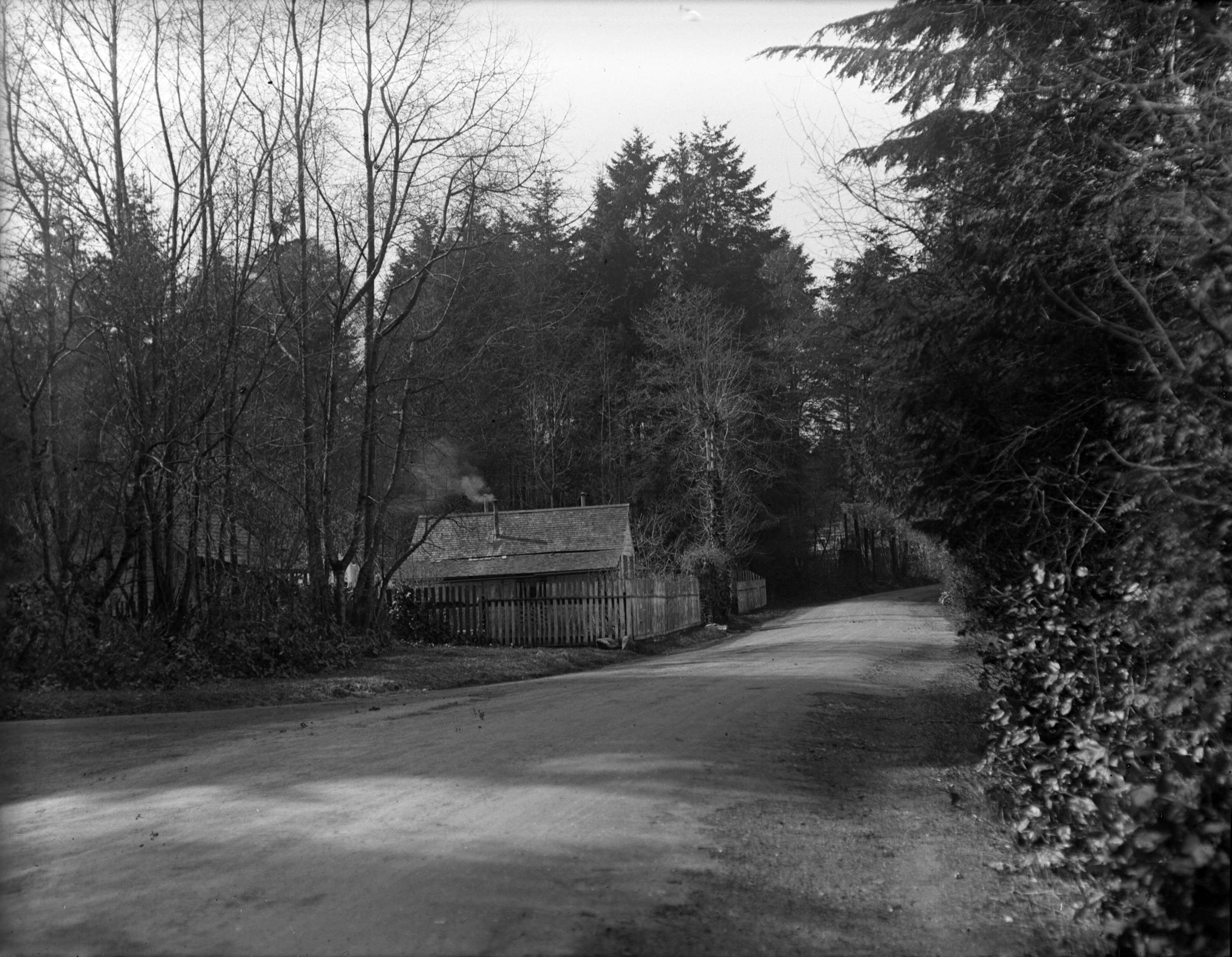
Tim Cummings' home in 1928. Cummings was the last squatter to live in Stanley Park, residing there until his death in 1958.

The first act of the Vancouver City Council at its first meeting in 1886 was to request that the 1,000-acre (4.0 km^{2}) military reserve be handed over for use as a park. Historians have pointed out that this may seem a strange priority for the nascent city as there was an abundance of green space at the time. The West End, however, was designated to be an upscale neighbourhood by speculators with connections to the CPR; they did not want the scattered settlements on this property to grow into another industrial, working-class neighbourhood. This act also signalled the beginning of the process that would see the remaining inhabitants of various origins evicted as squatters in the 1920s for the creation of a seemingly pristine park. It has been suggested that perhaps the new Stanley Park would ultimately be purged of any trace of its former Indigenous population. However, over time, the Vancouver Park Board has added Indigenous carvings.

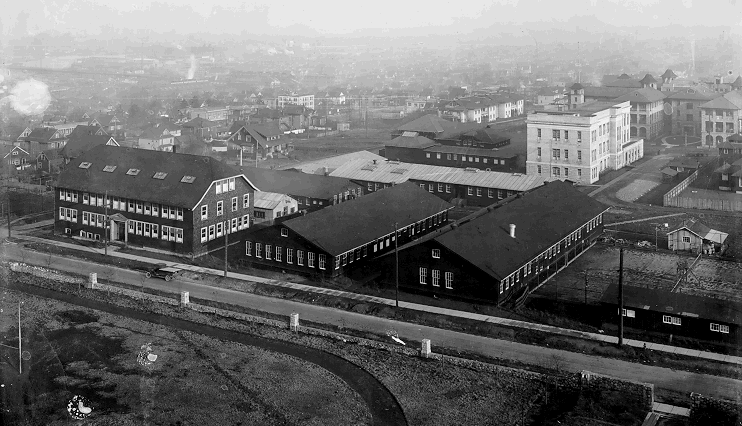
The University of British Columbia's first campus in Fairview, 1917. The university moved to its permanent location at Point Grey in 1925.

In 1877, Superintendent of Education John Jessop submitted a proposal for the formation of a provincial university. An Act Respecting the University of British Columbia was passed by the provincial legislature in 1890, but disagreements arose over whether to build the university on Vancouver Island or the mainland. A provincial university was formally called into being by the British Columbia University Act of 1908, although its location was not yet specified. Originally titled McGill University College of British Columbia (associated with McGill University in Montreal), it was selected in 1910 to be constructed at a site at Point Grey, though the outbreak of World War I delayed construction. The now-independent University of British Columbia began operations in 1915.

In 1911, Vancouver expanded with the amalgamation of the Hastings Townsite (originally called New Brighton). The former municipality's name continues on in the Hastings–Sunrise neighbourhood, which covers the same territory (together with northern Renfrew–Collingwood). Residents of the nearby Squamish village of Sen̓áḵw were forcibly evicted as part of this expansion in 1913.

Boundaries of Vancouver before the 1929 addition of Point Grey and South Vancouver

By the interwar years, other neighbourhoods had grown that were working class, but not especially impoverished or racially exclusive, such as Mount Pleasant, the suburb of South Vancouver, and Grandview–Woodland. Even the West End was becoming less exclusive. CPR developers once again established a new enclave for the city's white and wealthy elite that would pull them from the West End and be the destination for the "coming smart set". Point Grey was incorporated in 1908 for this purpose, and Shaughnessy Heights would be developed exclusively for the "richest and most prominent citizens", who were required to spend a minimum of CA$6,000 on the construction of new homes, which were to conform to specific style requirements. These patterns of economic segregation were apparently secured by 1929, when Point Grey and South Vancouver were amalgamated with Vancouver. Point Grey included the current neighbourhoods of West Point Grey, Dunbar–Southlands, Arbutus Ridge, Shaughnessy, South Cambie, Kerrisdale, western Oakridge, western Marpole; and South Vancouver included the current neighbourhoods of Riley Park–Little Mountain (excluding its northeast corner), central and southern Kensington–Cedar Cottage, southern Renfrew–Collingwood, Sunset, Victoria–Fraserview, Killarney, and eastern parts of Oakridge and Marpole. William Harold Malkin was the first mayor of the new city, having defeated incumbent Louis Denison Taylor, the champion of amalgamation, in the 1928 civic election.

=== Civic celebrations ===
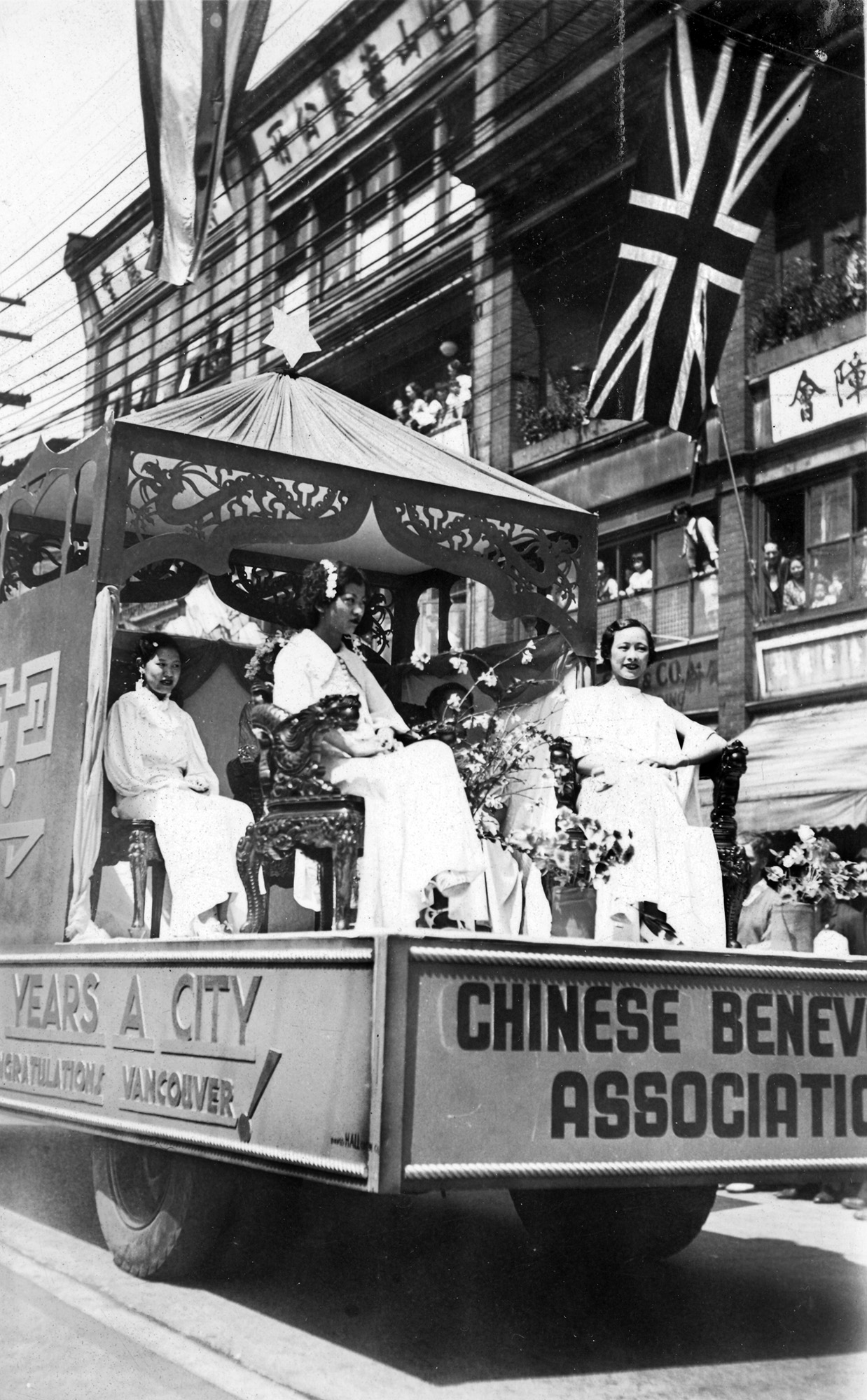
A Chinese Benevolent Association float at the city's jubilee parade, 1936

Vancouver was the site of major celebrations in 1936, in part to bolster civic spirit in the midst of the Great Depression, as well as to celebrate Vancouver's Jubilee. Mayor McGeer provoked considerable controversy by organizing expensive celebrations at a time when the city was teetering on the brink of bankruptcy and civic employees were working at a significantly reduced pay rate. Nevertheless, he did find a great deal of support from those who agreed a celebration would ultimately be good for the city's prosperity. While some large expenditures were roundly criticized – for example, the "ugly" fountain erected in Stanley Park's Lost Lagoon – others drew significant financial and public support, such as the construction of a new (and the current) city hall on Cambie Street.

The next major civic celebration was the 1939 Royal visit of the King and Queen as part of their tour of Canada which marked the end of the depression and the likelihood of another world war.

== World War II ==
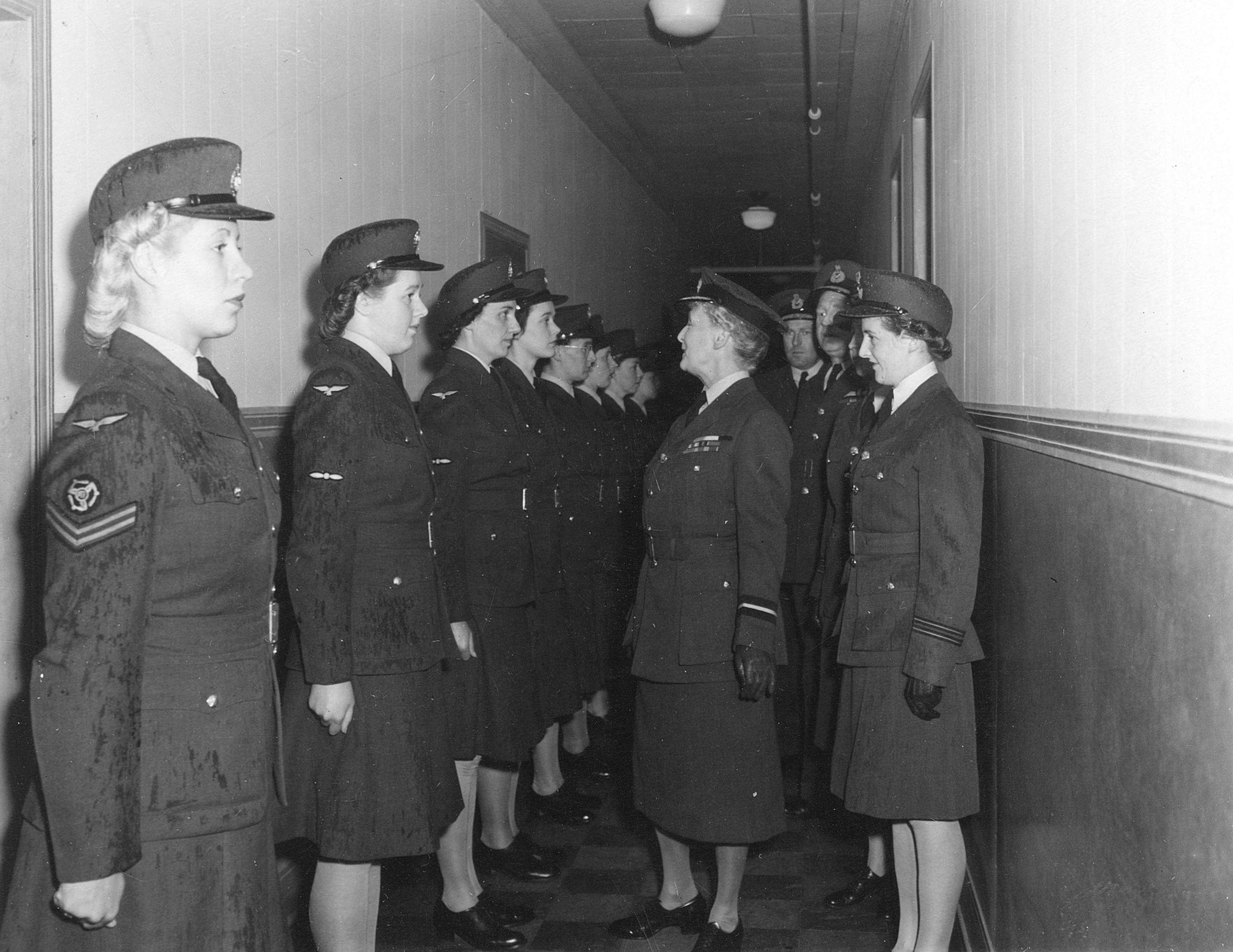
Hallway inspection of members of the Women's Army Corps at Western Air Command in Vancouver, 1942

The outbreak of World War II resulted in major changes for Vancouver. Local militia units quickly recruited extra members and Vancouver's Seaforth Highlanders of Canada, for example, had a battalion overseas in England within 4 months, and they remained in Europe fighting until the end of the war. The British Columbia Regiment, 15th Field Regiment RCA, 6th Field Engineers, HMCS Discovery and others all contributed to the war effort.

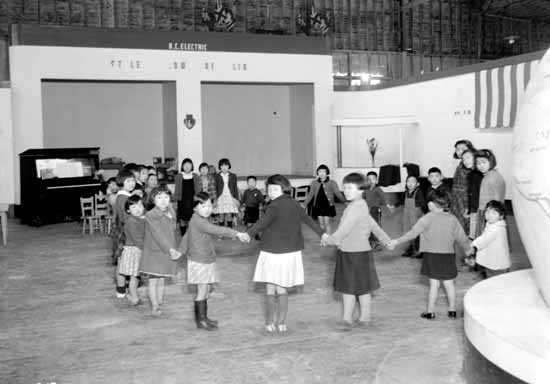
A Japanese Canadian kindergarten class at Hastings Park, a processing facility for Japanese Canadian internment, in 1942

Massive new spending by the governments and employment in the military and factories provided a much-needed economic boost after the Great Depression of the 1930s. Among the many products and weapons for war service produced in the Vancouver area were minesweepers and corvettes for the Royal Canadian Navy; anti-aircraft guns in Burnaby and the Boeing aircraft factory in nearby Richmond produced parts for B-29 bomber aircraft. The old defences for Vancouver Harbour were upgraded with coast artillery positions at Point Grey (the Museum of Anthropology is built on top of this); Stanley Park; under the Lion's Gate Bridge and at Point Atkinson.

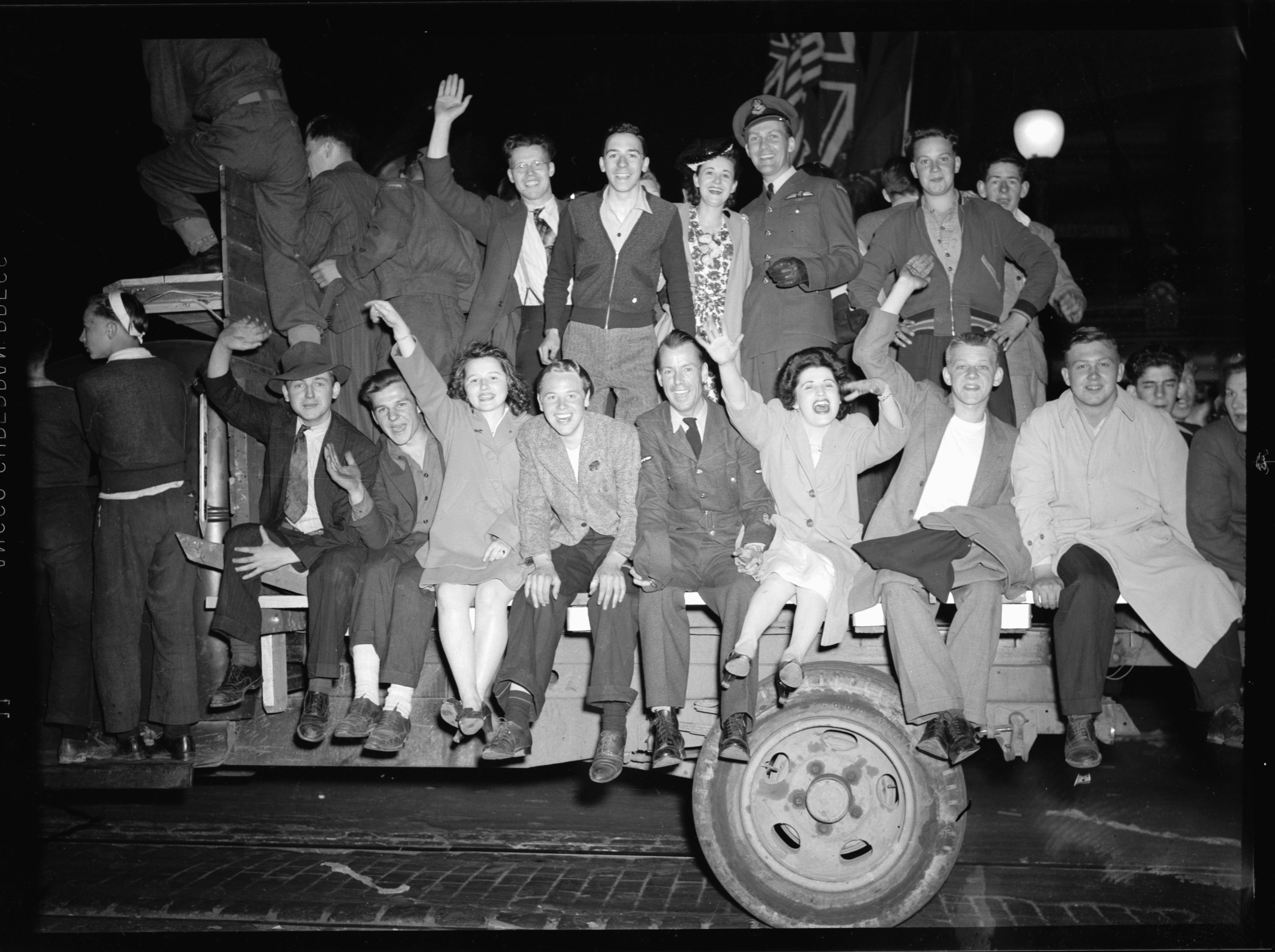
People in Vancouver celebrating the Victory in Europe, May 1945

In 1942, a few months after the Japanese attacked Pearl Harbor, Japanese Canadians were interned from the West Coast. The Americans did the same with their citizens of Japanese ancestry. Canadians of Japanese descent were placed into holding areas such as the barns at Hastings Park and then interned in camps in the interior by the federal government which invoked the War Measures Act.

Due to the fear of bombing and of poison gas attacks, a blackout was imposed on the West Coast in 1942 and schoolchildren and others were issued gas masks. Japan did indeed attack the West Coast. A Japanese submarine shelled the Estevan Point Lighthouse, Japanese soldiers invaded and held an island in Alaska and Japanese balloon bombs (fire balloons) were floated across the Pacific Ocean on air currents to wreak their havoc on the forests and citizens of Canada and the US. Locally these balloon bombs landed as close to Vancouver as Point Roberts, but their existence was kept secret until very late in the war.

== 1945 to 2000 ==
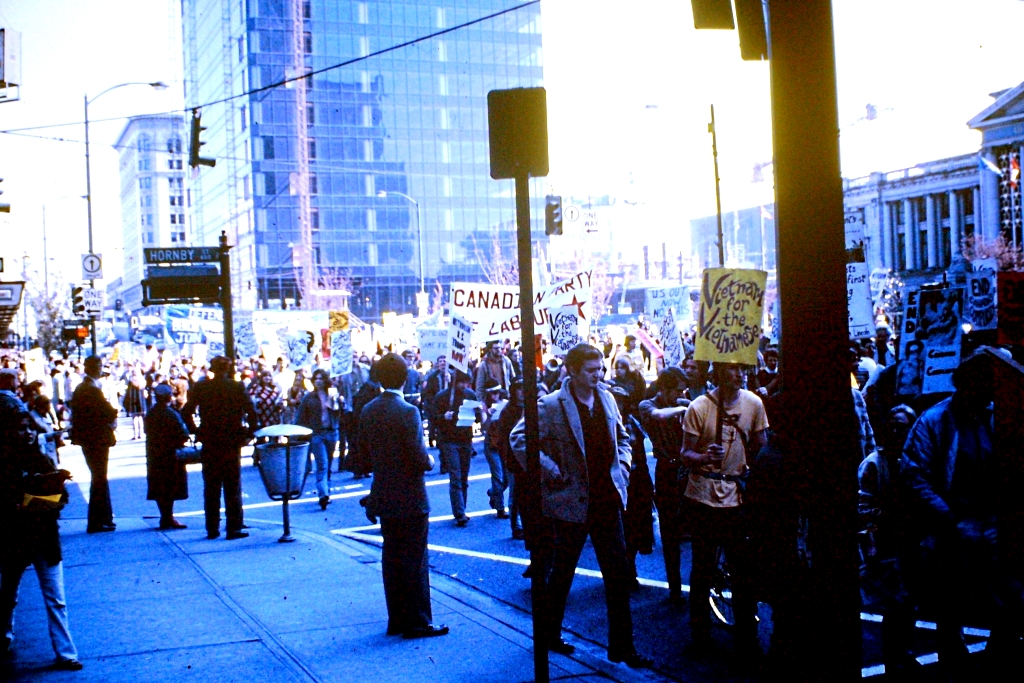
Protest against the Vietnam War in Vancouver, 1968

CBUT, the oldest television station in Western Canada, first went on the air in December 1953. The Oak Street Bridge, connecting Vancouver to Richmond across the Fraser River, opened in 1957. While the Second Narrows Bridge and the Lions' Gate Bridge had provided a connection to the North Shore since 1925 and 1938 respectively, the Ironworkers Memorial Second Narrows Crossing followed in 1960. The last vestiges of British Columbia Electric Railway's streetcar and interurban rail system were dismantled in 1958; many of the urban lines were replaced by trolley bus routes of the Vancouver trolley bus system, which opened in 1948. The city hosted the British Empire and Commonwealth Games in 1954.o

Another major bridge across the Fraser River, the Port Mann Bridge to Surrey, opened in 1964. Two new universities were established, the British Columbia Institute of Technology in 1964 and Simon Fraser University in 1965; both have satellite campuses in Vancouver. Residents of Strathcona – most of them Chinese – formed a protest movement led by civic activist Mary Lee Chan and prevented the construction of a freeway which would have resulted in the bulldozing of the neighbourhood. In 1967, the Greater Vancouver Regional District was incorporated. Greenpeace, one of the leading international environmental organizations, was founded in Vancouver in 1971. The conflict between hippies and Vancouver mayor Tom Campbell culminated in the Gastown riots of 1971.

In the 1960s, a highway was proposed to run through downtown Vancouver. The proposal was part of a program of urban renewal supported by funding from the Canadian Mortgage and Housing Corporation. The highway's route ran through Vancouver's historic Chinatown and Hogan's Alley, a predominantly black neighbourhood. Hogan's Alley was bulldozed in 1967 as part of the construction of the Georgia and Dunsmuir viaducts. A protest movement against the highway formed that used street protests, city council meetings, and a human chain blockade at the grand opening of the viaducts as protest tactics. Opposition united local activists in Stratchona led by Mary Lee Chan with city planning activists, led by future BC Premier Mike Harcourt. Opposition coalesced in the formation of The Electors' Action Movement (TEAM) that won two seats in the 1968 election and then majority control of city council in the 1972 Vancouver municipal election. The plans for the highway were ultimately abandoned and Vancouver does not have a highway through its downtown. The urban planning that took place after this period and which had a focus on active transportation, low-rise densification, and parks is often called Vancouverism.

In 1968 the Canada Council awarded a $3,500 grant to Joachim Foikis of Vancouver "to revive the ancient and time-honoured tradition of town fool". He made a habit of attending all city council meetings in full traditional jester's outfit, adding wit, nursery rhymes and interest to the normally pedestrian meetings and bringing international attention to Vancouver.

Disc sports debuted in Vancouver on Kitsilano Beach in 1974 with the Vancouver Open Frisbee Championships.

The continuing growth of the airport on Sea Island resulted in the construction of another bridge across the Fraser River, the Arthur Laing Bridge which opened to traffic in 1975.

As Pacific Central Station replaced Waterfront Station as the main railway station in 1979, the latter was transformed into the terminal of SeaBus and the future SkyTrain (which opened six years later). Canada's first domed stadium, BC Place Stadium opened in 1983. The SkyTrain and the BC Place Stadium, as well as Science World, Canada Place and the Plaza of Nations, were constructed for Expo 86. This significant international event was the last World's Fair held in North America and was considered a success, receiving 22,111,578 visits.

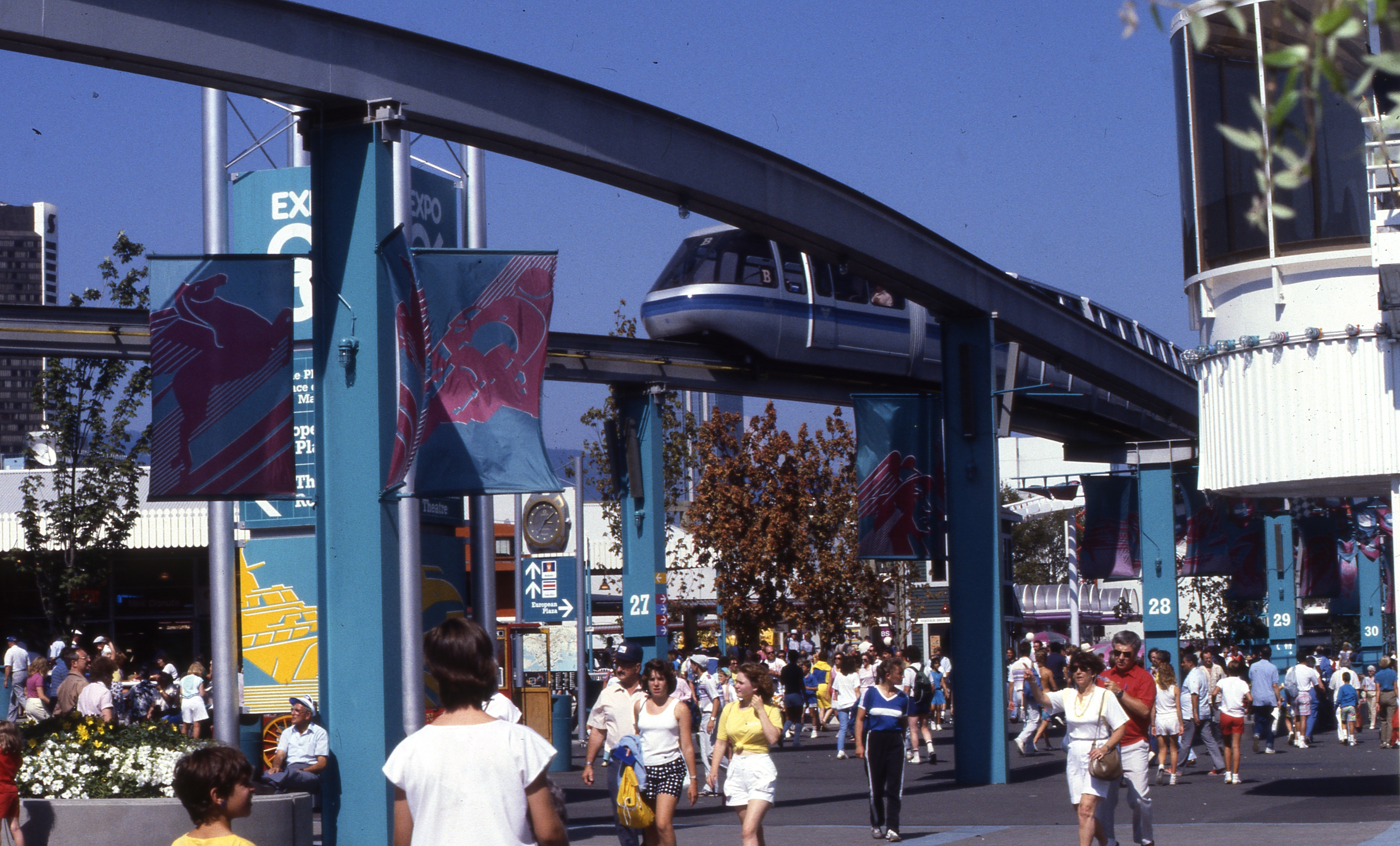
Expo 86 was held in Vancouver. The theme of the world fair was transportation and communication.

In 1951 the population stood at 562,000; by 1971 it reached 1,000,000. The Park Royal Shopping Centre, in West Vancouver, became the first in the city in 1950 and Empire Stadium, was built to host the 1954 British Empire Games. Vancouver became the western anchor of the new CBC national television network in 1958 and the western hub of the newly completed Trans-Canada Highway in 1962. The giant Tsawwassen Ferry Terminal, was built in 1959 for passenger and vehicle ferry service to southern Vancouver Island and the nearby Roberts Bank Superport coal terminal was finished in the late sixties. A second, Second Narrow's Bridge was built in 1960 and the W.A.C. Bennett Dam was completed in 1967.

The establishment of the Queen Elizabeth Theatre in 1959 and of Simon Fraser University in 1965, enriched the city's cultural life. Canada's first purpose-built auto racing track, the Westwood Motorsport Park was built in nearby Coquitlam, that same year. The first McDonald's restaurant outside the United States was opened in Richmond in 1967.

== Early 21st century ==
Vancouver was awarded the hosting rights of the 2010 Winter Olympics and 2010 Winter Paralympics in 2003, with some events held in Richmond, West Vancouver, Whistler, and the University of British Columbia campus. The city has also hosted matches of the 2015 FIFA Women's World Cup and the 2026 FIFA World Cup at BC Place stadium, the home of the BC Lions and the Vancouver Whitecaps. General Motors Place (now Rogers Arena) opened in 1995 as the new home of the Vancouver Canucks, whose Stanley Cup runs caused riots in 1994 and in 2011.

=== Housing crisis ===
In the first decade of the 2000s, the average purchase price of detached homes and condominiums in Vancouver began to outpace inflation. The 2008 financial crisis created a period of price stability between 2008 and 2011. Average housing prices then began to climb, doubling between 2011 and 2016, and continued to rise through the 2010s and early 2020s, with the average sale price in Vancouver peaking at $2,847,000 in 2024 before declining to $2,555,000 in February 2026. The cost of rentals followed a similar pattern with a slower rate of increase, doubling from an average of $950/month in 2011 to $1,875/month in 2025. Homelessness also increased in the same period from 1,602 persons in 2012 to 2,715 in 2025.

The cost of housing has been a major political issue in Vancouver and is considered a contributor to an affordability crisis in the city. There are multiple factors that have contributed to the increase in housing costs, including a substantial decrease in federal funding for subsidized housing construction, increased immigration to the region, federal and provincial subsidies for home ownership, domestic and foreign speculation in the Canadian housing market, and low interest rates in the first two decades of the 21st century.

=== Chinese immigration ===
Political uncertainties rose as Hong Kong headed towards the transfer of sovereignty over Hong Kong from the United Kingdom to China. Many wealthy Chinese residents of Hong Kong chose to immigrate to Canada, as it was relatively easier for them to enter the country due to their Commonwealth of Nations connections. It was also relatively easier for Hong Kongers to migrate to Canada than to the US, as the latter set fixed quotas for different nationalities, while Canada ran on a "points" system, allowing immigrants to arrive if they have desirable factors such as graduate degrees, training, funds to start new businesses and language abilities.

According to statistics compiled by the Canadian Consulate in Hong Kong, from 1991 to 1996, "about 30,000 Hong Kongers emigrated every year to Canada, comprising over half of all Hong Kong emigration and about 20% of the total number of immigrants to Canada." The great majority of these people settled in the Toronto and Vancouver areas, as there are well-established Chinese communities in those cities. After the Handover, there was a sharp decline in immigration numbers. Since 1997, there has been a steady influx of Chinese from China, Singapore and other locales of the Chinese diaspora. In 2022, Vancouver elected its first Chinese-Canadian mayor, Ken Sim.

== See also ==
- History of British Columbia
- List of heritage buildings in Vancouver
- Timeline of Vancouver history
