= Truman (given name) =

Truman is a given name. Notable people with the name include:

- Truman H. Aldrich (1848–1932), American politician
- Truman Smith Baxter (1867–1931), Canadian politician
- Truman Bethurum (1898–1969), American contactee
- Truman Bewley (born 1941), American economist
- Truman Boardman (1810–1895), American politician
- Truman Bodden (born 1945), Caymanian politician
- Truman Bradley (Native American) (died 1900), Schaghticoke Native American who lived in the village of Nichols Farms in Trumbull, Connecticut
- Truman Bradley (actor) (1905–1974), American actor and narrator
- Truman W. Brophy (1848–1928), American dentist
- Truman Capote (1924–1984), American author
- Truman Chafin (born 1945), American politician
- Truman W. Collins (1902–1964), American businessman, civic leader, and philanthropist
- Truman H. DeLap (1885–1974), American politician
- Truman C. Everts (1816–1901), American explorer
- Truman Enos (1777–1858), American politician
- Truman Futch (1891–1960), American politician
- Truman Gibson (1912–2005), American businessman, attorney, government advisor, and boxing promoter
- Truman Hart (1784–1838), American politician
- Truman Head (1809–1875), Union Army soldier
- Truman H. Hoag (1816–1870), American politician
- Truman Ward Ingersoll (1862–1922), American photographer
- Truman H. Judd (1817–1884), American politician
- Truman Kimbro (1919–1944), American soldier
- Truman H. Landon (1905–1986), American air force general
- Truman Lowe (1944–2019), Ho-Chunk artist
- Truman G. Madsen (1926–2009), American religious philosopher
- Truman Michelson (1879–1938), American linguist
- Truman J. Nelson (1911–1987), American writer
- Truman Handy Newberry (1864–1945), American politician
- Truman O. Olson (1917–1944), American soldier
- Truman B. Ransom (1802–1847), American educator and military officer
- Truman Reeves (1840–1924), American politician
- Truman Henry Safford (1836–1901), American calculating prodigy
- Truman Seymour (1824–1891), American general
- Truman Smith (1791–1884), American politician
- Truman Smith (officer) (1893–1970), American infantry officer
- Truman Spain (1913–1968), American football tackle
- Truman Spangrud (born 1934), American general
- Truman Taylor (born 1932), American television host
- Truman F. Wilbanks (1891–1967), American football player and coach
- Truman "True" Williams (1839–1897), American illustrator
- Truman G. Younglove (1815–1882), American politician
- Truman G. Yuncker (1891–1964), American botanist

== Fictional characters ==
- Truman Burbank, fictional character in the film The Truman Show
- Truman Motley, fictional character in the 1976-2000 comic strip Motley's Crew
- Truman X, fictional character in the television series The X's
- Truman Tomten, fictional character in the television series Noddy

== See also ==
- Truman (surname)
- Matty Healy (born 1989), English musician who is also known as "Truman Black"
