= Turman =

Turman may refer to:

== People ==
- Buddy Turman (1933–2007), American professional heavyweight boxer
- George Turman (1928–2008), former Lieutenant Governor of Montana
- Glynn Turman (born 1947), American stage, television, film actor and writer, director, and producer
- Jimmy Turman (1927–2019), American politician
- Lawrence Turman (1926–2023), American film producer, director of The Peter Stark Producing Program at the University of Southern California

== Places ==
- Turman, Iran, village in South Khorasan
- Turman Township, Sullivan County, Indiana, USA

== See also ==
- Turmen
- Truman
