= Truman House =

Truman House may refer to:

== Associated with U.S. President Harry S. Truman ==
- Harry S. Truman Little White House, Key West, Florida, NRHP-listed
- Harry S. Truman National Historic Site, Independence, Missouri & Grandview, Missouri, the family farm and longtime home of Harry S. Truman, NRHP-listed
- Wallace House, Independence, Missouri, also known as Truman Home, in Harry S. Truman Historic District
- Solomon Young Farm-Harry S. Truman Farm, Grandview, Missouri, NRHP-listed, part of Harry S. Truman Historic District
- Harry S Truman Birthplace State Historic Site, Lamar, Missouri, a house that is NRHP-listed as Harry Truman Birthplace Memorial

== Other ==
- Truman-Randall House, Florence, Arizona, listed on the NRHP in Pinal County, Arizona
- House at 7246 St. Augustine Road, Jacksonville, Florida, also known as the Truman House, NRHP-listed
- Truman's Place, Hughesville, Maryland, NRHP-listed

== See also ==
- Truman Annex, Key West, Florida, USA
- Truman Building, Washington, D.C., USA; HQ for the Department of State
- Truman Balcony, at the White House, Washington, D.C., USA
- Harry S. Truman Presidential Library and Museum, Independence, Missouri, USA
- Harry Truman (disambiguation)
- Truman (disambiguation)
