= 1992 United States Senate election in Arizona =

- November 3, 1992
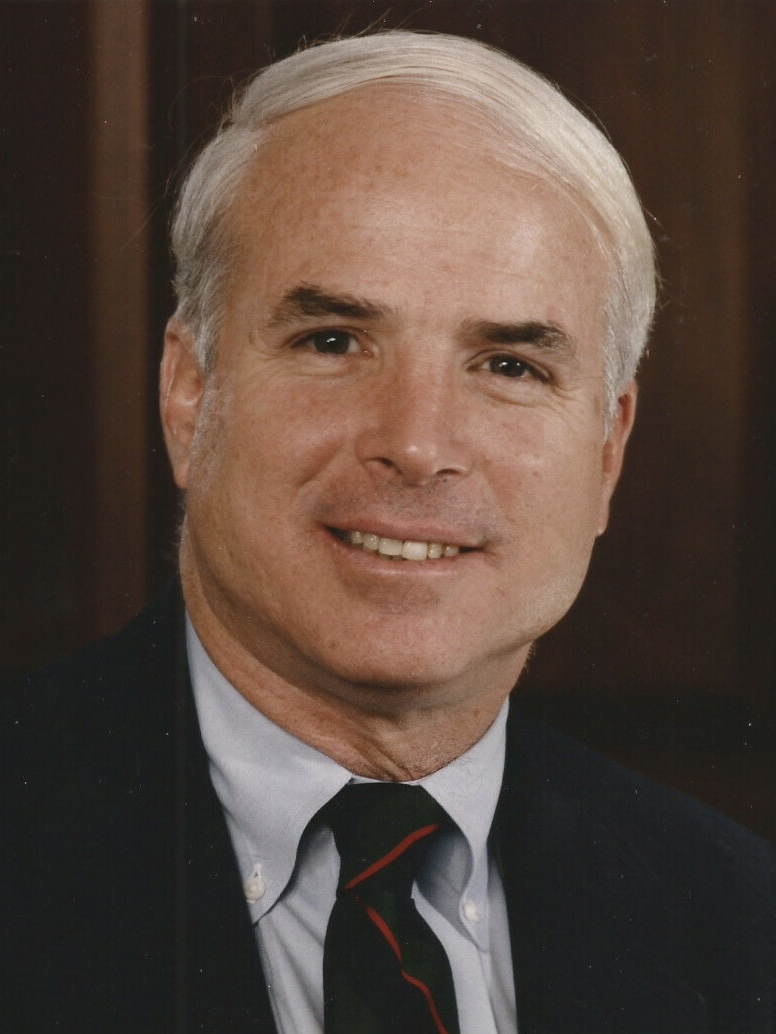

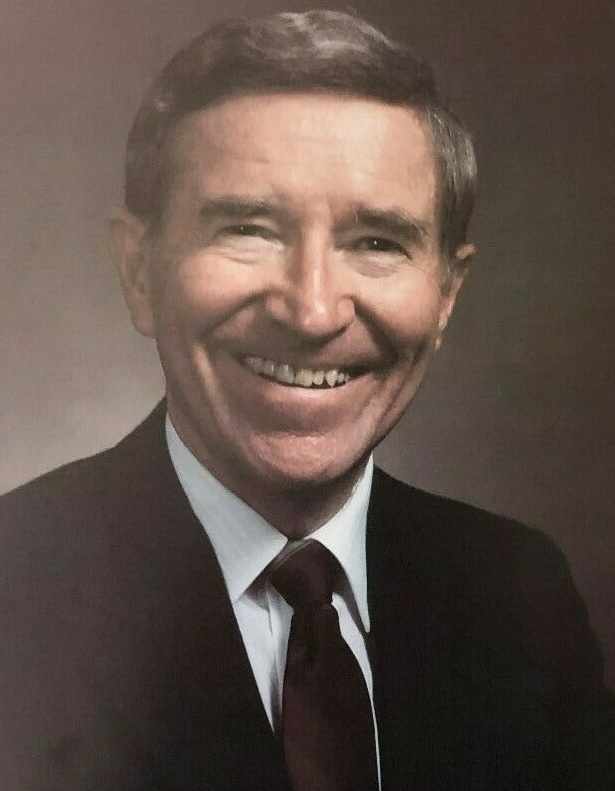
Nominee	John McCain	Claire Sargent	Evan Mecham
Party	Republican	Democratic	Independent
Popular vote	771,395	436,321	145,361
Percentage	55.82%	31.57%	10.52%
- County results McCain: 40–50% 50–60% Sargent: 40–50%
U.S. senator before election
John McCain
Republican
Elected U.S. Senator
John McCain
Republican

The 1992 United States Senate election in Arizona was held on November 3. Incumbent Republican U.S. Senator John McCain won re-election to a second term.

== Democratic primary ==
=== Candidates ===
- Claire Sargent, community activist
- Truman Spangrud, Air Force Lieutenant General

== General election ==
=== Candidates ===
- Kiana Delamare (Libertarian)
- Ed Finkelstein (New Alliance)
- John McCain, incumbent U.S. Senator (Republican)
- Evan Mecham, former Governor and candidate for this seat in 1962 (Independent)
- Claire Sargent, community activist (Democratic)
- Robert B. Winn (Independent)

=== Results ===
General election results
Party	Candidate	Votes	%	±%
Republican	John McCain (incumbent)	771,395	55.82%	−4.66%
Democratic	Claire Sargent	436,321	31.57%	−7.94%
Independent	Evan Mecham	145,361	10.52%	
Libertarian	Kiana Delamare	22,613	1.64%	
New Alliance	Ed Finkelstein	6,335	0.46%	
Write-in		26	0.00%	
Majority		335,074	24.24%	+3.28%
Turnout		1,382,051		
Republican hold		Swing		

== See also ==
- 1992 United States Senate elections
