= Trueman =

Trueman is a surname of English origin, and may refer to

- Albert William Trueman (1902–1988), Canadian educator and administrator
- Arthur Elijah Trueman (1894–1956), English geologist
- Bert Trueman (1882–1961), English footballer
- Brian Trueman (1932–2024), British writer and broadcaster
- Carl Trueman (born 1967), English professor and theologian
- Fred Trueman (1931–2006), British cricketer
- Inez Trueman (1917–2015), Canadian politician
- Mark Trueman (born 1988), English football manager and former player
- Peter Trueman (1934–2021), Canadian television and radio personality
- Stuart Trueman (1911–1995), Canadian author and journalist

== Fictional ==
- Martin Trueman, fictional villain from The Sarah Jane Adventures
- Patrick Trueman, fictional character from EastEnders
- Paul Trueman, fictional character from EastEnders
- Yolande Trueman, fictional character from EastEnders

== See also ==
- Truman (surname)
