= William Reid Owen =

Canadian politician

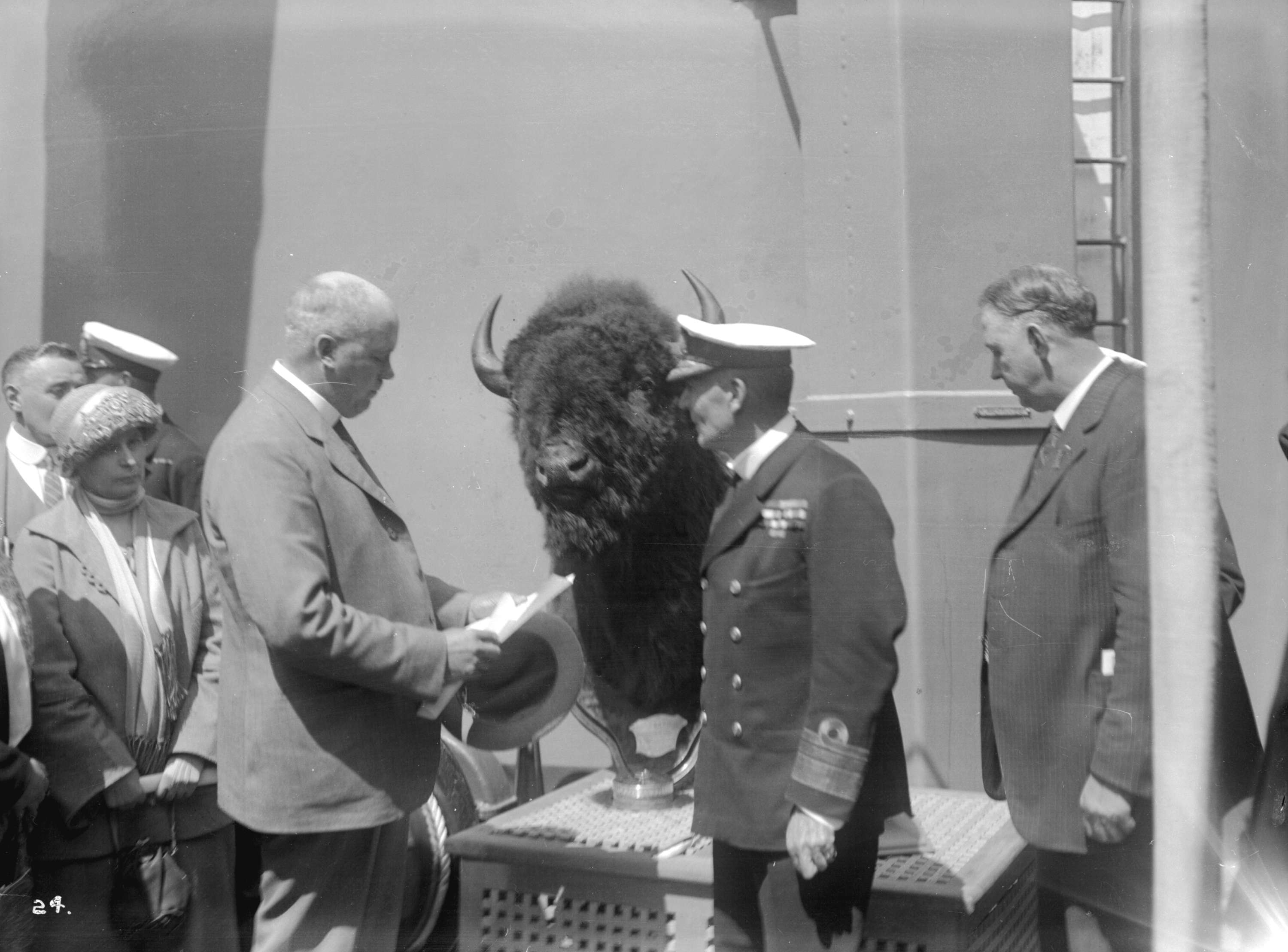
Mayor Owen meets Rear Admiral Field on the visit of HMS Hood to Vancouver with the Battlecruiser Squadron, June 1924

William Reid Owen (25 November 1864 – 22 March 1949) was the 20th mayor of Vancouver, British Columbia in 1924. He was born in Ontario and moved to Vancouver in 1899.

He became mayor after winning a narrow victory over Louis Taylor by 53 votes. He lost to Taylor the following year by 640 votes.
