= Truman Smith Baxter =

Canadian mayor

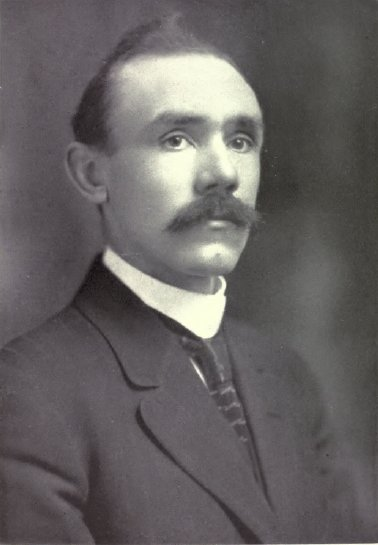

16th Mayor of Vancouver
- In office 1913–1914
- Preceded by: James Findlay
- Succeeded by: L. D. Taylor

Personal details
- Born: November 24, 1867 Near Carlingford, Fullerton Township, Perth County, Ontario, Canada
- Died: October 27, 1931 (aged 63) Vancouver, British Columbia, Canada
- Spouse: Sarah Whiteside
- Children: 4
- Profession: Lawyer and businessman

Truman Smith Baxter (November 24, 1867 – October 27, 1931) was the 16th mayor of Vancouver, British Columbia. He was born on a farm near Carlingford, Ontario, part of Fullertown Township in Perth County. He was the son of Richard and Elizabeth Baxter, the former a native of Ontario, and the latter of Cornwall, England. The paternal grandfather came from New York to Ontario at the time of the American Revolutionary War, being numbered among the United Empire Loyalists.

== Career ==
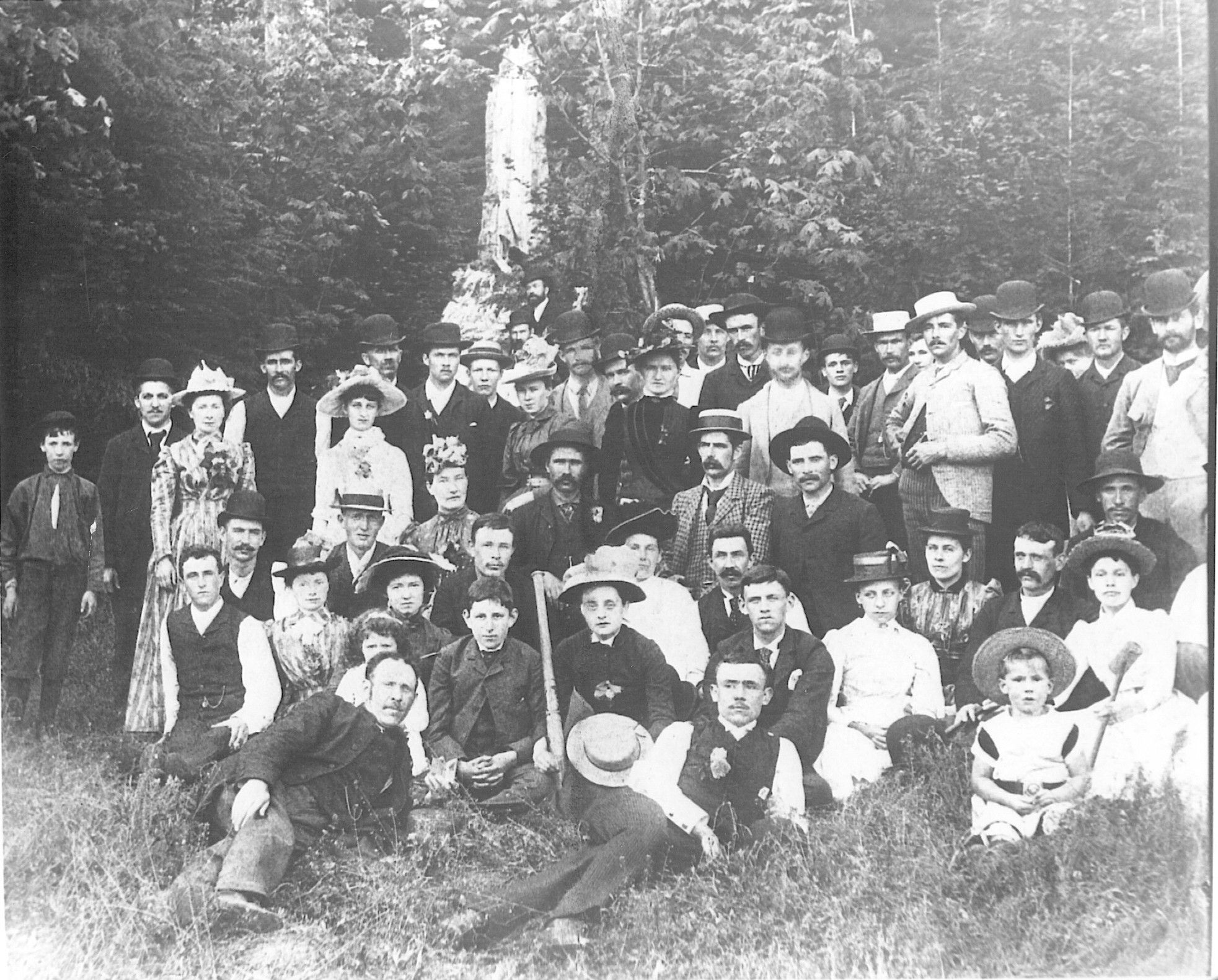
Future Mayor T.S. Baxter reclining in center at the First Presbyterian Church picnic in North Vancouver July 1891. His future wife Sarah Whiteside is the second woman standing from the left.

Truman was educated in the public schools in Perth County Ontario and then attended High School in Stratford Ontario. His mother, Elizabeth died when he was fourteen years old. His father Richard continued farming until his retirement in 1907 when he moved to Toronto. After graduation, Truman took up the profession of teaching, which he practiced for three years in Ontario. In the spring of 1890, at the age of 23, he moved to Vancouver. His first position was in the Leamy & Kyle mill on False creek, one of the city's first sawmills, often referred to as the "Red Mill". After a time he went to the Royal City Planing Mills, and later the Heaps mill on False creek which was later destroyed by fire. During his first year of residence in Vancouver he was employed grading the streets and was also a longshoreman. He then began studying for a first-class teachers certificate in connection with J.A. Fraser, who was at the time MLA for Cariboo. After obtaining the certificate he worked as a teacher in the public schools in Vancouver, eventually becoming the first assistant at Mount Pleasant School. He then studied law and five years later was called to the bar. He practiced for three years in partnership with L.B. McLellan and William Savage. In partnership with Peter Wright he purchased the furniture store of G.W. Hutchins at the corner of Main and Hastings Street, and renamed it Baxter and Wright.

Baxter served on three occasions as an alderman for ward 5 in Vancouver (1900, 1905-6, 1912). In 1903, he was an unsuccessful candidate for the provincial legislature, as a Liberal. In 1913, he became mayor running as an independent, and was elected by acclamation. In 1914, he won a second term against L. D. Taylor by 2091 votes. Baxter ran on his strengths as a business administrator, arguing that he had pulled the city’s finances together out of the “financial chaos” caused by previous administrations. Baxter was said to be favoured by women voters, Taylor by working men. In 1915, he lost to Taylor by 686 votes.

At Lulu Island, in 1893, Baxter married Miss Sarah Whiteside, a daughter of John Whiteside and a sister of Thomas Whiteside, who for two years also represented ward 5 in city council. They had four children together- Ernest, Fred, Harold, and Marguerite. Baxter was an enthusiastic motorist, and was one of the first car owners in British Columbia. He belonged to the Loyal Orange Lodge, and various civic and social clubs including the Vancouver Board of Trade, Progress, Terminal City, Commercial and Automobile clubs.

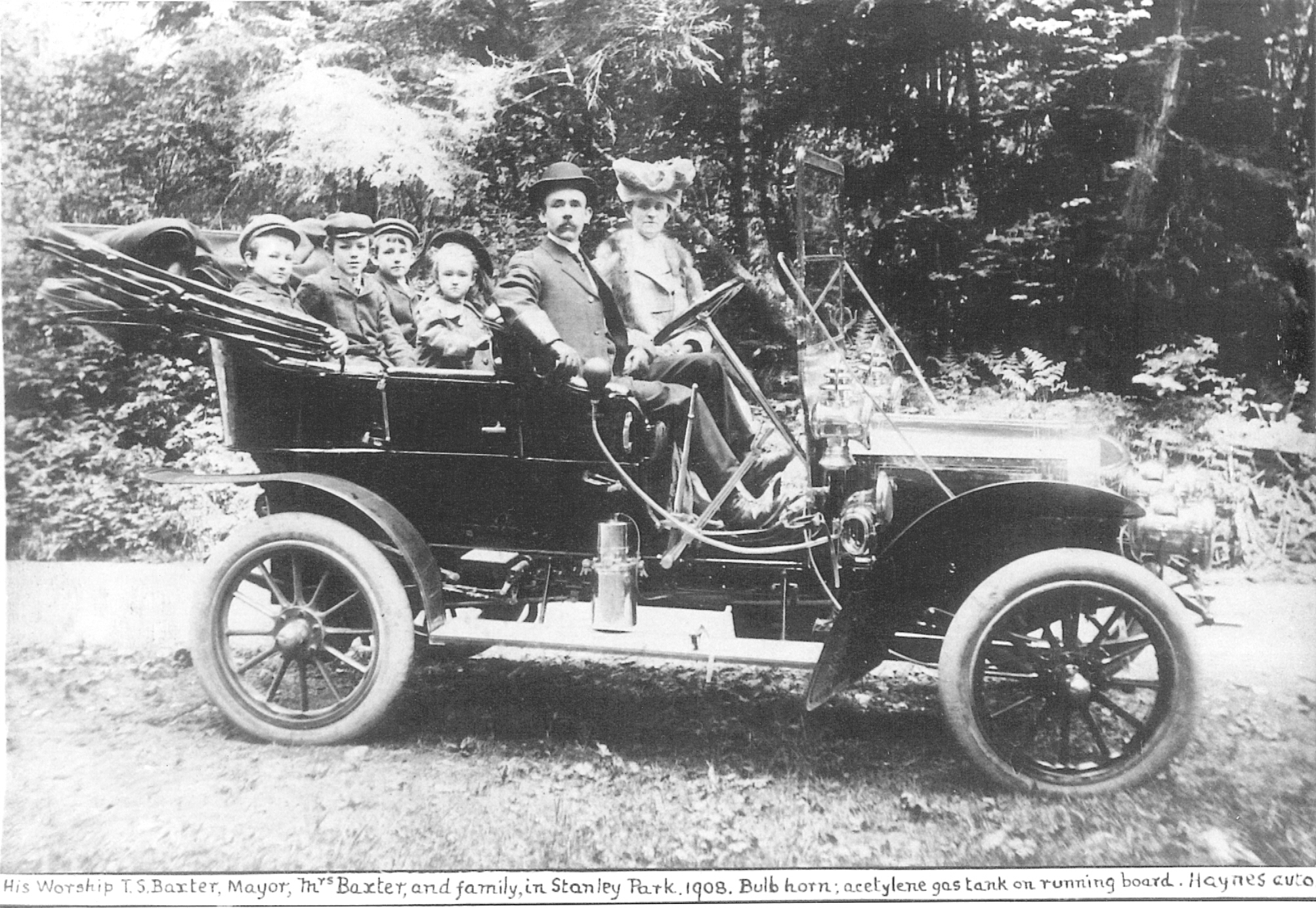
His worship T.S. Baxter, Mayor of Vancouver and family in Stanley Park in 1908

Baxter faced not only a time of economic decline, but also the circumstances surrounding Canada's involvement with World War I. Two of his four children volunteered to serve overseas in that conflict. All civic departments were reorganized to adapt to the financial crisis and war priorities. At the outbreak of the war, city council voted a two per cent cut in pay of civil servants, but also formed a Charities and Relief Committee to look after those most in need. He worked hard to carry the Canadian Northern Railway agreement to False creek, and was successful in that effort.
