= L. D. Taylor =

Canadian politician (1857–1946)

His Worship Louis Taylor
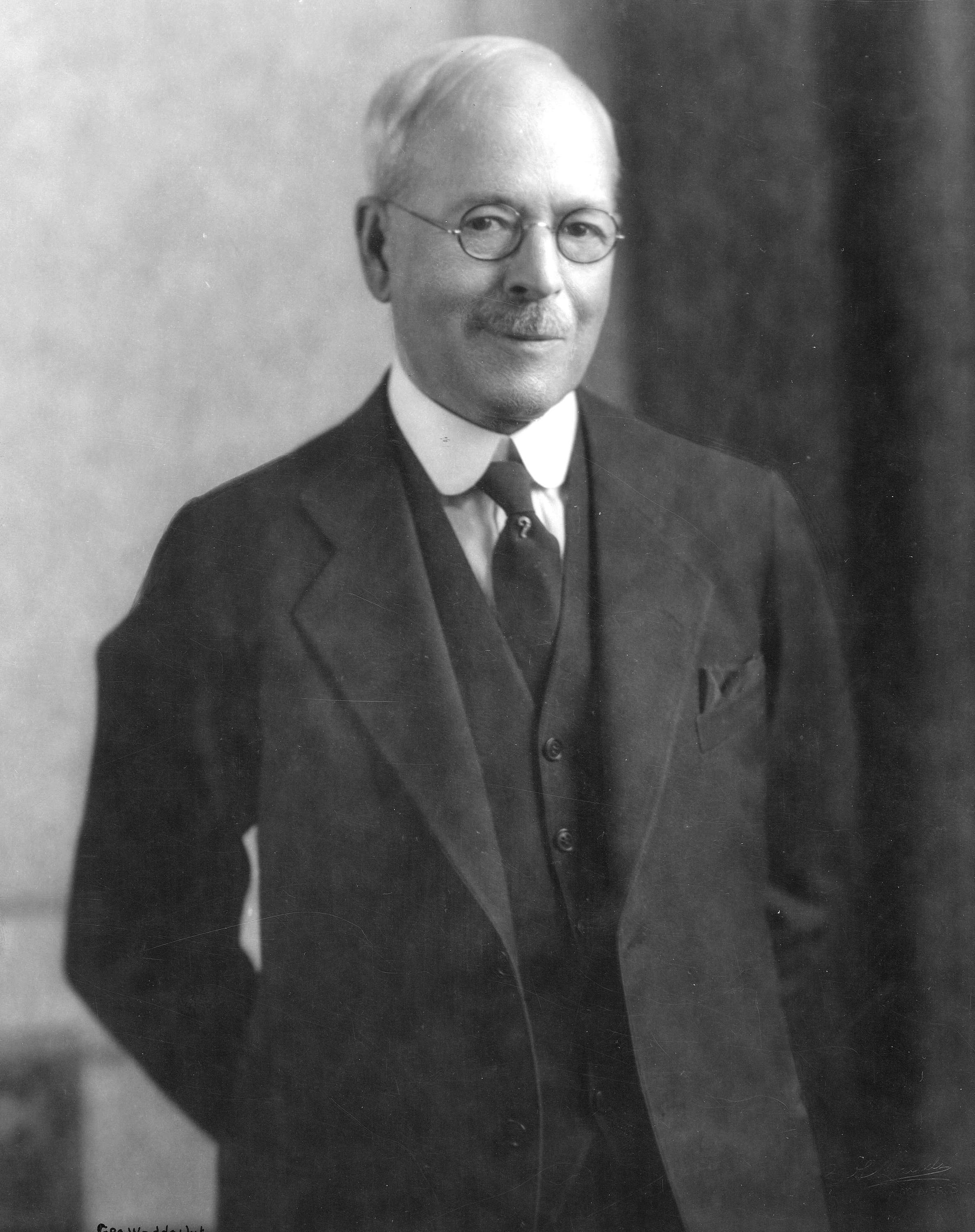
- Taylor in 1932

14th Mayor of Vancouver
- In office 1931–1934
- Preceded by: William H. Malkin
- Succeeded by: Gerry McGeer
- In office 1925–1928
- Preceded by: William R. Owen
- Succeeded by: William H. Malkin
- In office 1915–1915
- Preceded by: Truman S. Baxter
- Succeeded by: Malcolm P. McBeath
- In office 1910–1911
- Preceded by: Charles Douglas
- Succeeded by: James Findlay

Personal details
- Born: July 22, 1857 Ann Arbor, Michigan, U.S.
- Died: June 4, 1946 (aged 88) Vancouver, British Columbia, Canada
- Party: Liberal
- Profession: Pioneer, businessman

Louis Denison Taylor (July 22, 1857 – June 4, 1946) was elected the 14th mayor of Vancouver, British Columbia. He was elected eight times between 1910 and 1934, serving a total of 11 years.

== Biography ==
Born in Michigan, Taylor lived in Chicago before coming to Vancouver on September 8, 1896. He briefly participated in the Klondike Gold Rush before beginning his political career.

L. D. Taylor championed the issue of amalgamating South Vancouver and Point Grey with Vancouver, and oversaw a variety of public works projects in the rapidly developing city, including the opening of the airport at Sea Island and the Burrard Street Bridge. Amalgamation would take place in 1929 but not under Taylor, because he lost the 1928 election to W. H. Malkin.

Taylor was a Georgist, locally known as 'Single-Tax Taylor' for his belief in the economic teaching of Henry George. Taylor ran as a friend of organized labour, although he opposed labour militancy and Communists.

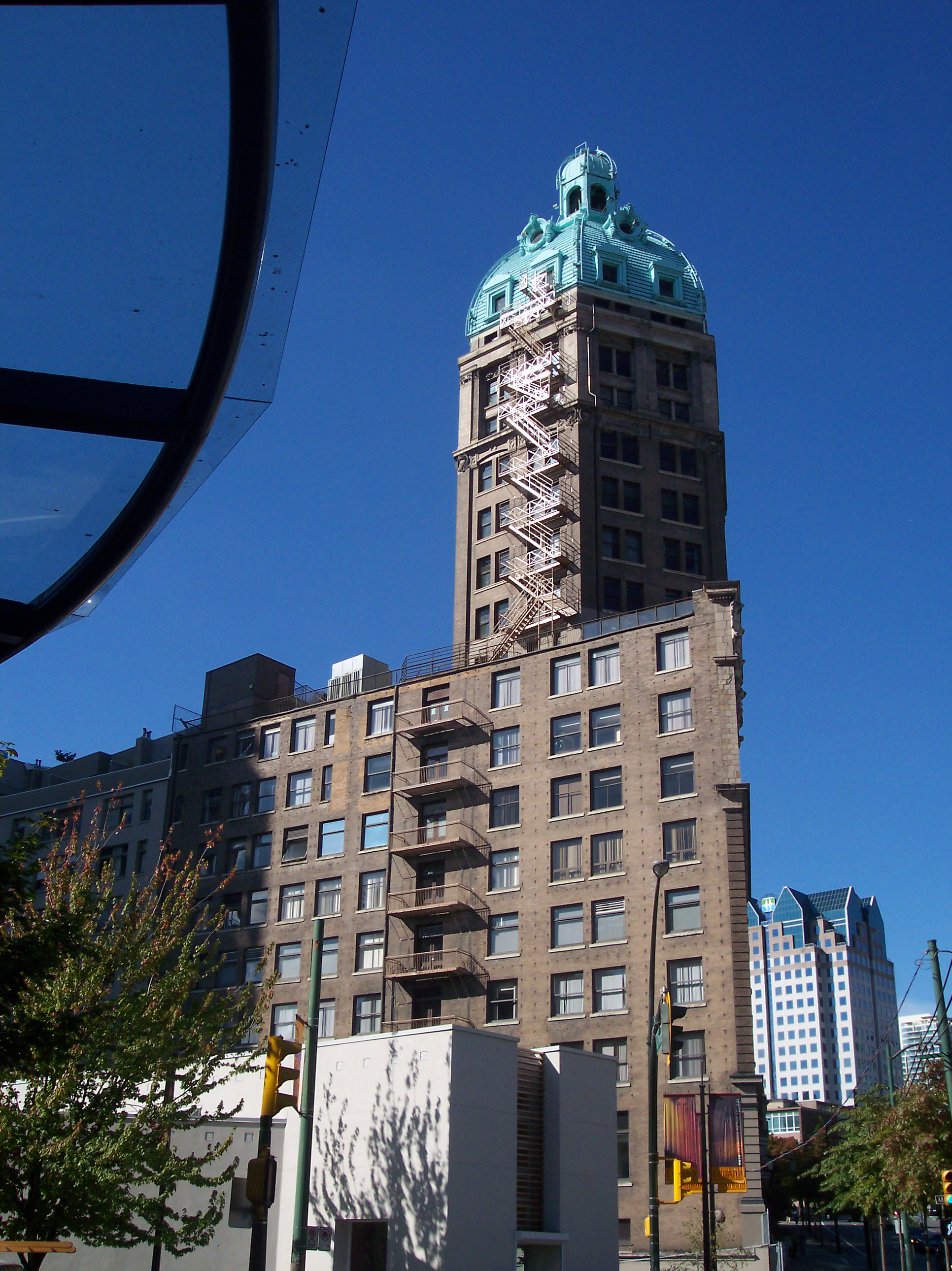
The Sun Tower at Pender and Beatty Streets, erected by L. D. Taylor as the headquarters for his Vancouver World newspaper.

Mayor Taylor's political career immeasurably benefited from his other role as a newspaperman. He began in the trade working for the Vancouver Daily Province before buying the Vancouver World. The building he had constructed for his newspaper was later taken over by the Vancouver Sun and remains a landmark building in the city, known today as the Sun Tower. Taylor eventually was forced to sell the paper, but not before using it as a political platform from which he railed against Chinese immigration, big business, and other issues of the day that helped establish his reputation as a populist leader.

He had an interest in civil aviation and invited American aviator Charles Lindbergh to visit Vancouver; Lindbergh declined due to the lack of a suitable landing field. On July 23, 1928, Taylor was an invited guest on the inaugural B.C. Airways Limited flight between Victoria, Seattle, and Vancouver. As he disembarked from the Ford Trimotor plane at Minoru Racetrack in Richmond, British Columbia, Taylor accidentally walked into a still-rotating propeller and fractured his skull. An attending physician noted that he would have been killed instantly had he been taller, as the propeller had not caused severe damage to the inner skull; an observer remarked that "if he'd had an ounce more brains he'd be dead". Taylor underwent surgery at Vancouver General Hospital and was discharged on August 21. The plane itself crashed on August 25 near Port Townsend, Washington, with no survivors among its seven passengers and crew, and the airline folded.

Despite his popularity at the polls, Taylor often found himself mired in controversy. In particular, an exhaustive 1928 inquiry into allegations of corruption in the police department and city hall revealed that he had associations with known vice operators in the city. Although he was cleared of any criminal wrongdoing, the inquiry blamed his "open town" policy on the proliferation of vice and crime in Vancouver. Mayor Taylor claimed that he had no intention of running a "Sunday School town" and argued that police resources should be spent on major crimes, not victimless vice crimes. Taylor lost re-election in 1928 but returned to the mayor's office in 1930. He attended the opening ceremonies at Sea Island Airport on July 22, 1931, but became ill the next day and spent several months in recovery.

This was the basis for Gerry McGeer's 1934 electoral campaign, which obliterated Taylor's political career with the largest electoral defeat Vancouver had ever seen. McGeer was an old adversary of Taylor, having been the lead attorney prosecuting the 1928 police inquiry, and claimed in his campaign that he would eliminate the crime and corruption that flourished under Taylor's civic administration. Taylor unsuccessfully contested several more elections, but spent the rest of his life bitter about the 1934 election. He died in poverty. Taylor Manor, a senior citizens' home in East Vancouver, was named for him in 1946. It was renovated and re-opened in 2015 as a supportive-housing complex for people living on the street with mental health and addiction problems.

== See also ==
- History of Vancouver
