= Harry Truman (disambiguation) =

Harry S. Truman (1884–1972) was the 33rd president of the United States from 1945 to 1953.

Harry Truman may also refer to:

== Places ==
- Harry S Truman State Park, Truman Lake, Osage River, Missouri, United States
- Harry S. Truman Reservoir, Osage River, Missouri, United States
- Harry S. Truman Historic District, Independence, Missouri, United States

=== Facilities and structures ===
- Harry S Truman Building, Washington, D.C.; the headquarters of the U.S. Department of State
- Harry S Truman Airport, St. Thomas, U.S. Virgin Islands
- Harry S. Truman Bridge, Missouri River, Missouri, United States
- Harry S. Truman Parkway, Savannah, Georgia, United States
- Harry S. Truman Memorial Veterans' Hospital, Columbia, Missouri, United States
- Harry S. Truman College, Chicago, Illinois, United States
- Harry S Truman High School (disambiguation)

== Music ==
- "Harry Truman" (song), a 1975 song by Chicago from Chicago VIII
- "Harry Truman", a song by Headgear
- "Harry Truman", a song by Mindless Self Indulgence from Frankenstein Girls Will Seem Strangely Sexy

== Other uses ==
- Harry R. Truman (1896–1980), victim of the eruption of Mount St. Helens
- Harry Truman (rugby union) (1909–1984), Welsh rugby union player
- Harry Truman Simanjuntak (born 1951), Indonesian archaeologist
- Harry Truman Day, 8th of May
- USS Harry S. Truman, a Nimitz-class super-carrier of the United States Navy
- Harry S Truman School of Public Affairs, University of Missouri
- Harry S. Truman: A Life (book), 1994 biography about the U.S. president
- Harry S. Truman (Twin Peaks), a character on Twin Peaks

== See also ==
- Presidency of Harry S. Truman, his presidency
