= Senator Truman (disambiguation) =

Harry S. Truman (1884–1972) was a U.S. Senator from Missouri from 1935 to 1945. Senator Truman may also refer to:

- George E. Truman (1865–1929), Arizona State Senate
- James S. Truman (1874–1957), New York State Senate
- Lyman Truman (1806–1881), New York State Senate
