= William Harold Malkin =

Canadian politician

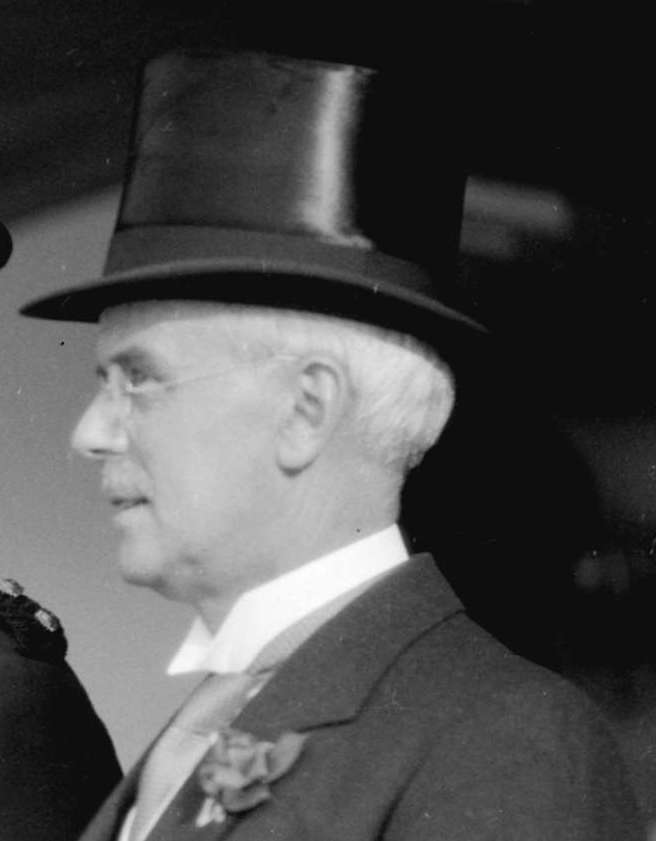

21st Mayor of Vancouver
- In office 1929–1930
- Preceded by: Louis D. Taylor
- Succeeded by: Louis D. Taylor

Personal details
- Born: 30 July 1868 Burslem, Staffordshire, England
- Died: 11 October 1959 (aged 91) Vancouver, British Columbia, Canada
- Spouse: Marion Malkin

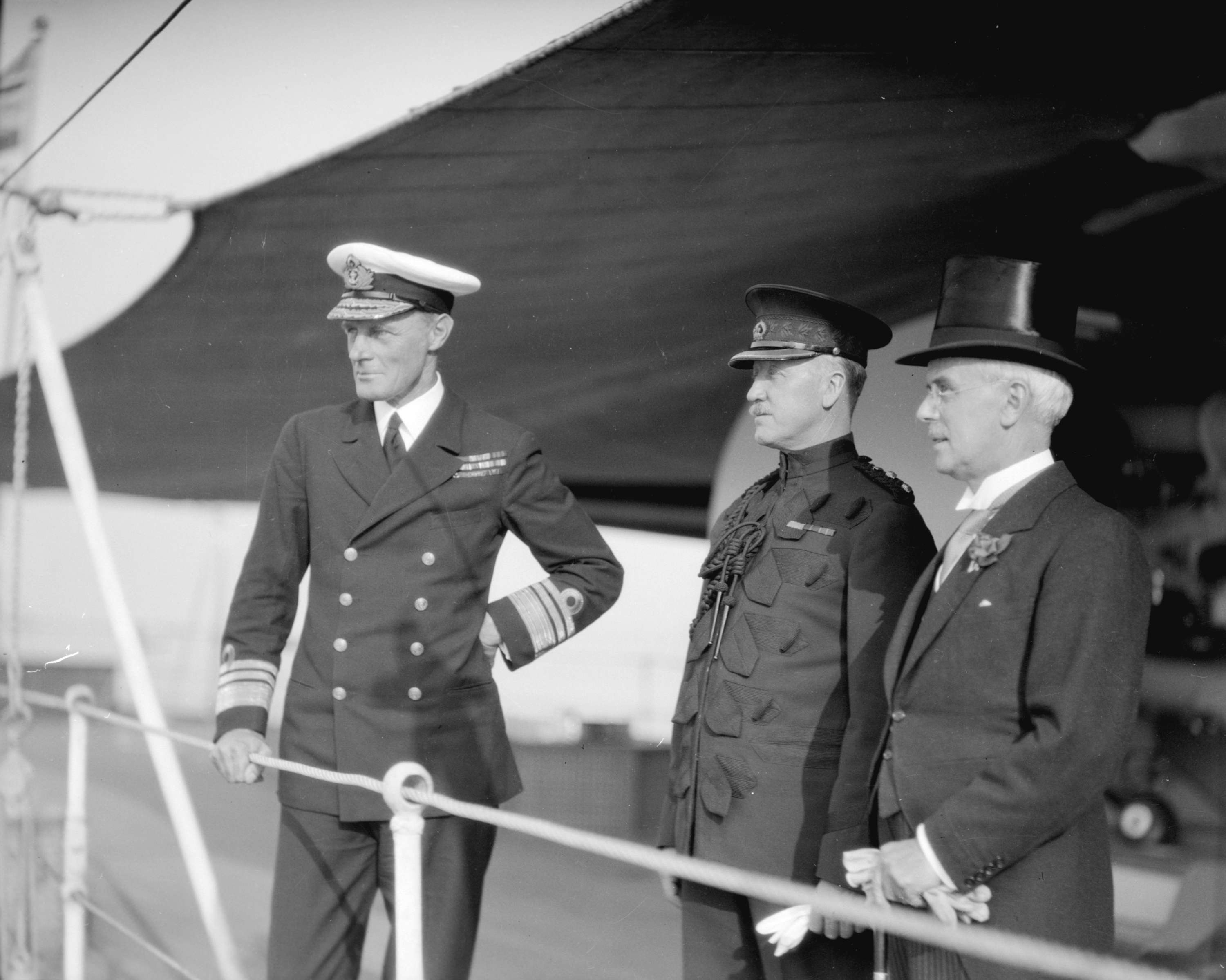
Mayor Malkin, right, with Vice-Admiral Vernon Haggard on the occasion of the visit of HMS Despatch and HMS Dauntless at Vancouver, August 1930

William Harold Malkin (30 July 1868 – 11 October 1959) was the 21st mayor of Vancouver, British Columbia. He was born in Burslem, Staffordshire, England. He served as chairman of the Vancouver Board of Trade in 1902.

Malkin succeeded L. D. Taylor as mayor in 1929, and served through 1930. After Malkin's re-election campaign failed, Taylor was re-elected as mayor in 1931.

While in power, Malkin presided over a newly expanded Greater Vancouver which formed by merging the existing city of Vancouver with the municipalities of Point Grey and South Vancouver. Malkin was responsible for the construction of the Malkin Bowl in Stanley Park, and named it for his wife, Marion.
