= Harry Truman (rugby union) =

- Full name: William Henry Truman
- Born: 11 December 1909 Porth, Wales
- Died: 23 June 1984 (aged 74) Tenby, Wales

Rugby union career
- Position: Forward
International career
Years	Team	Apps	(Points)
1934–35	Wales	2	(0)

William Henry Truman (11 December 1909 — 23 June 1984) was a Welsh international rugby union player.

Born in Porth, Truman moved to Tenby aged five and attended Tenby Council School, where he learned his rugby.

Truman played for his local side Tenby United after school and ascended to the vice-captaincy his second season in 1930–31. After a briefly stint with London Welsh, Truman joined Llanelly in the 1931–32 season. He became Tenby's first Wales international when he made his debut in the front row against England at Cardiff during the 1934 Home Nations, before gaining a second cap in 1935 against the same opponent at Twickenham, this time utilised in the second row.

== See also ==
- List of Wales national rugby union players
