= James Findlay (British Columbia politician) =

Canadian politician

James Findlay (5 October 1854 – 19 October 1924) was the 15th mayor of Vancouver, British Columbia. Born in Montreal, he moved to Vancouver in June 1887.

Findlay defeated incumbent Louis Taylor by 1314 votes and became mayor for 1912, but he did not seek another term beyond that year.
