= Turman, Iran =

Turman طورمان
- Village
- Location within Iran
- Coordinates: 33°08′18″N 59°23′57″E
- Country: Iran
- Province: South Khorasan
- County: Birjand
- Bakhsh: Central
- Rural District: Alqurat

Population (2006)
  - Total: 150
- Time zone: UTC+3:30 (IRST)
  - Summer (DST): UTC+4:30 (IRDT)

Turman (Persian: طورمان, also Romanized as Ţūrmān) is a village in Alqurat Rural District, in the Central District of Birjand County, South Khorasan Province, Iran. At the 2006 census, its population was 150, in 43 families.
