= James Truman =

James Truman may refer to:

- James S. Truman (1874–1957), American lawyer and politician from New York
- James W. Truman, American chronobiologist
