= Truman Spangrud =

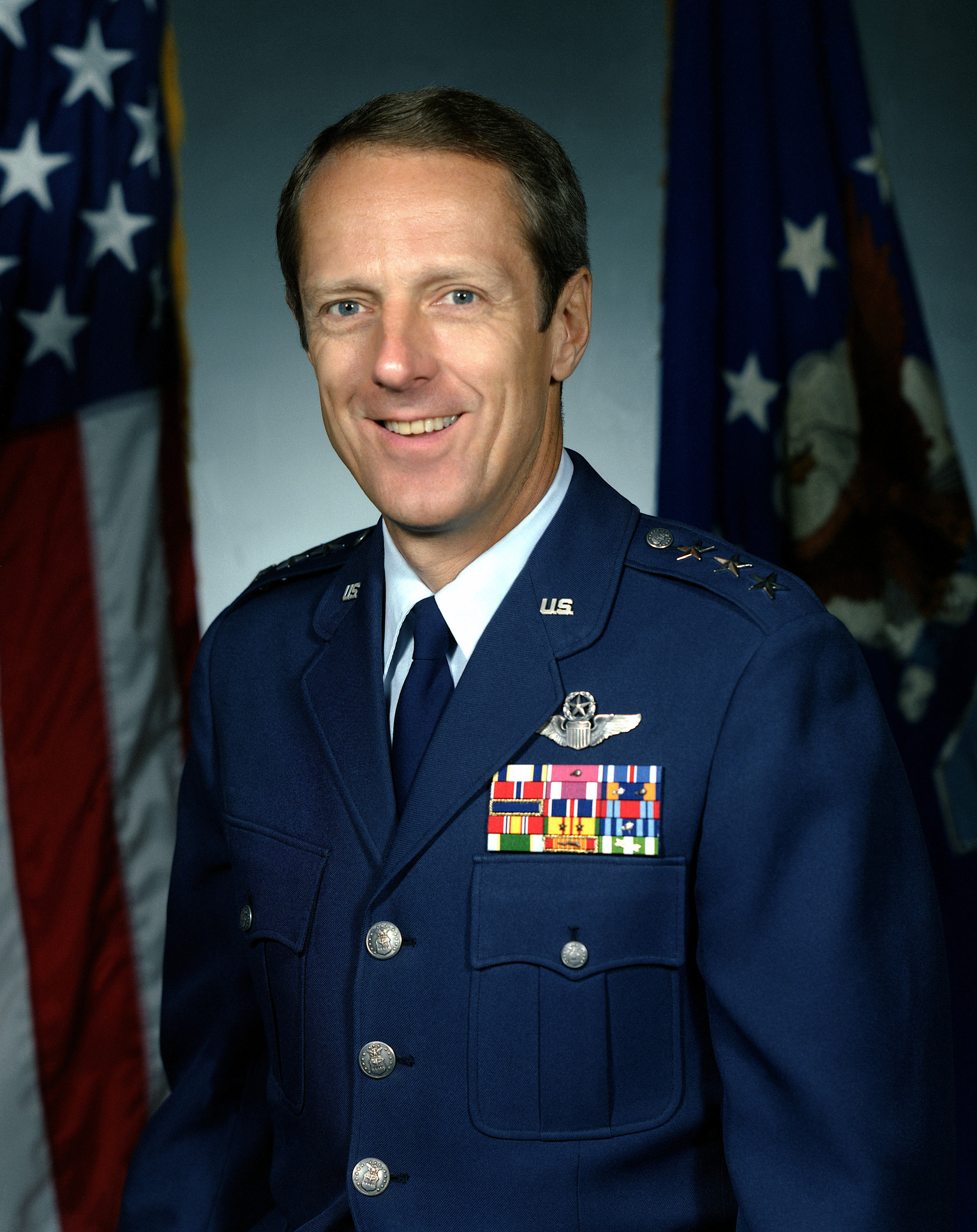
- Born: December 21, 1934 (age 91); Kennedy, Minnesota, U.S.
- Military career
- Allegiance: United States of America
- Branch: United States Air Force
- Service years: 1956–1988
- Rank: Lieutenant General

Casper "Truman" Spangrud (born December 21, 1934) is a retired lieutenant general in the United States Air Force. He was commander of Air University from 1986 to 1988.

Spangrud was born in 1934, in Kennedy, Minn., and graduated from Karlstad (Minn.) High School in 1952. He received a bachelor's degree from the University of Arizona, Tucson, in 1956 and a master of science degree in business administration from The George Washington University, Washington, D.C., in 1966. He is a graduate of Air Command and Staff College and the National War College.

Commissioned through the Reserve Officer Training Corps program in 1956, the general completed pilot training at Marana Air Base, Arizona, and Greenville Air Force Base, Mississippi, in December 1957. He completed F-84F and F-100 training at Nellis Air Force Base, Nev., and Luke Air Force Base, Ariz., in June 1958. After B-47 training at McConnell Air Force Base, Kan., in February 1959, he was assigned to the 98th Bombardment Wing, Lincoln Air Force Base, Neb., where he commanded a B-47 crew from March 1962 to August 1965. His crew was upgraded to select status in 1964 and he held a spot promotion to major. He graduated from Air Command and Staff College as a distinguished graduate in June 1966, and concurrently earned a master's degree from The George Washington University.

From July to December 1966 the general trained as an F-4 pilot at Davis-Monthan Air Force Base, Ariz. He then served a split tour of duty as an F-4 pilot with the 8th Tactical Fighter Wing at Ubon Royal Thai Air Force Base, Thailand, and as deputy chief of the All-Weather Attack Division, Office of the Deputy Chief of Staff for Operations, Headquarters 7th Air Force, Republic of Vietnam. While assigned to Southeast Asia he flew 81 combat missions, 58 over North Vietnam.

Upon his return to the United States in November 1967, Spangrud was assigned to Headquarters Strategic Air Command at Offutt Air Force Base, Nebraska, as a computer systems analyst in the Office of the Deputy Chief of Staff for Operations. From August 1969 to June 1971 he served as aide, pilot and executive officer to the SAC vice commander in chief.

Graduating from the National War College as an outstanding graduate in June 1972, Spangrud was assigned as executive officer to the comptroller of the Air Force, Headquarters U.S. Air Force, Washington, D.C. He then served as chief, Cost Analysis Division, and in March 1974 he became director of the Cost and Management Analysis Directorate.

From July 1977 to March 1980 Spangrud served as deputy chief of staff, comptroller, Air Force Systems Command, Andrews Air Force Base, Md. He then became vice commander of the Electronic Systems Division, Air Force Systems Command, Hanscom Air Force Base, Massachusetts. In August 1982 he was assigned as director of budget at Air Force headquarters, and in September 1984 he became comptroller of the Air Force. He assumed his present command in November 1986.

The general is a command pilot with 3,500 flying hours. His military decorations and awards include the Distinguished Service Medal, Legion of Merit with oak leaf cluster, Distinguished Flying Cross, Bronze Star Medal, Meritorious Service Medal and Air Medal with six oak leaf clusters.

He was promoted to lieutenant general September 1, 1984, with same date of rank. He retired on August 1, 1988.
