= Colony of British Columbia =

The Colony of British Columbia refers to one of two colonies of British North America, located on the Pacific coast of modern-day Canada:

- Colony of British Columbia (1858–1866)
- Colony of British Columbia (1866–1871)

== See also ==
- History of British Columbia
