= Sound Heritage (journal and series) =

Canadian oral history journal

Sound Heritage Series
- Discipline: History of British Columbia, oral history
- Language: English

Publication details
- Former name: Sound Heritage
- History: 1974–1983
- Publisher: Provincial Archives of British Columbia (Canada)
- Frequency: Quarterly

Standard abbreviations
- ISO 4: Sound Herit. Ser.

Indexing
- Sound Heritage Series
- ISSN: 0228-7781
- Sound Heritage
- ISSN: 0316-2826

Sound Heritage (later known as the Sound Heritage Series) was a quarterly journal — and later a series of historical monographs — dealing with topics in British Columbia history, and based primarily on oral history sources. It was published during the years 1974–1983 in Victoria, BC, by the Aural History Program (later the Sound and Moving Division, or "SMID") of the Provincial Archives of British Columbia (PABC).

== Contents ==
=== Origins and evolution of Sound Heritage ===
Sound Heritage evolved in 1974 from Reynoldston Research and Studies (RRAS), a journal that focused on oral history as a discipline. Volume numbers were continuous between the two publications; volume 2 of RRAS was followed by volume 3 of Sound Heritage.

During the years 1974 to 1977, Sound Heritage began to gradually change "from a quarterly journal about oral history . . . to a monograph series issued more or less quarterly, demonstrating oral history in its very broadest sense."

Early issues of Sound Heritage continued the RRAS format, featuring articles, essays, memoirs, poems, excerpts from transcribed interviews, and reviews of books and recordings using oral history. Issues were sometimes loosely organized around a common theme. The format changed starting with vol. 5, no. 1, Skeena Country, edited by Allen Specht. Except for a related short story, the entire issue was based on interviews recorded during the 1960s in the Skeena and Bulkley regions by Imbert Orchard. This format of unified, single-themed issues was eventually adopted for the rest of the series' run.

In 1980, Sound Heritage completed its transition to a monographic series, with resulting changes in numbering; volume 8 number 4 of Sound Heritage was followed by number 28 of the Sound Heritage Series (SHS).

=== Themes ===
The idea of organizing issues around historical themes would continue for the life of the publication. A few popular themes would emerge.

- Regional history: Several issues were constructed as popular histories of BC regions and communities, such as Clayoquot Sound, the Gulf Islands, the Okanagan Valley, the Lardeau region of the West Kootenay, and the city of Victoria. A combined double issue, "Opening Doors," focused on Vancouver's Strathcona neighbourhood.
- First Nations history: "Lillooet Stories" dealt with the culture and traditions of the Lillooet people (St'át'imc Nation). A notable pair of issues under the title "nut-ka," examined the history and survival of Nootka (Nuu-chah-nulth) indigenous culture after Captain Cook's arrival on the west coast of Vancouver Island.
- Industrial history: There were issues devoted to aviation, coastwise shipping, forestry, labour unions, railroading, and radio broadcasting.
- Social history: Other books featured projects about missionaries, utopian settlements, and the propagation of tall tales.

=== Sources ===
A major and founding oral history collection of the Aural History Program, PABC, was the Imbert Orchard fonds, which contains about 950 interviews recorded all over British Columbia in the years 1959–1979 by radio producer Imbert Orchard (1909–1991) of CBC Vancouver. Six of the Sound Heritage/SHS books were based exclusively on regional sub-series of Orchard interviews, including books on the Skeena and Okanagan regions and the city of Victoria. Orchard himself wrote two books on the Fraser Valley from his interviews, as well as Martin: The Story of a Young Fur Trader, an oral biography that drew on 34 hours of interviews with Starret.

Several Sound Heritage books drew on newly created oral history collections that were specially commissioned or acquired by the PABC. For instance: vol. 6 no. 2, Navigating the Coast, was based on Peter Chapman's extensive interviews with employees and passengers of the Union Steamship Company. Vol. 8 no. 4, In the Western Mountains, drew on Susan Leslie's project to record interviews with pioneers of BC Mountaineering.

=== International Standard Serial Number ===
Because of the 1980 change from a journal to a series of monographs, Sound Heritage has two different ISSNs:

- 0316-2826 (1974 – 1980) - Sound Heritage
- 0228-7781 (1980 – 1983) - Sound Heritage Series

=== Related publications from the Aural History Program, PABC ===
Steveston Recollected. Text by Daphne Marlatt; photographs by Robert Minden and Rex Weyler. (Provincial Archives of British Columbia, 1975)

Voices: A Guide to Oral History. Edited by Derek Reimer, David Mattison, and Allen Specht. (Provincial Archives of British Columbia,1984)

== Sound Programs ==
Several numbers of Sound Heritage/SHS had accompanying documentary sound programs. These were published in the form of audio cassettes, which could be ordered separately to complement the books. The programs were often produced by the author of the corresponding book. Some programs were condensations of the book's contents; others focused on one facet (or even one interview) from the source oral history collection.

== Legacy ==
In 1982, the BC government announced the cancellation of the Sound Heritage Series. The series ended in 1983 with the publication of SHS no. 40, Growing Up in the Valley, by Imbert Orchard. In 1984, an anthology of material excerpted from the series was published by Douglas & McIntyre of Vancouver.
