= Operation Solidarity =

1983 protest movement in British Columbia

The Operation Solidarity (also known as the Solidarity Crisis) refers to a large-scale protest movement in British Columbia, Canada in 1983 that emerged in response to the Social Credit (Socred) government's economic policy of austerity and anti-union legislation. The movement arose during a period when Canada’s economic conditions had sharply declined since 1980, characterized by high unemployment and inflation. In this context, governments across the country were under pressure to cut public expenditures. In February 1982, Premier Bill Bennett implemented a wage control program, and his 1983 re-election platform was built around the theme of “restraint.”

Following the re-election of the Socred government, a sweeping series of bills was introduced on July 7, 1983. These bills aimed to drastically reduce spending on social programs, and included the closure of the province’s Human Rights Tribunal, along with the elimination of rent controls, tenant rights, and various employment standards.

In response, labour organizations across the province united in an unprecedented show of solidarity. The Solidarity Coalition, composed of community organizations, activists, and trade unions, was formed to challenge these legislative changes. Many believed this mass coalition would eventually escalate into a full general strike. The scale and intensity of the opposition forced the government to back down on its attack on labour rights, and it was a formative time for the labour unions involved. Provinces across Canada learned from the event about the erosion of democratic protections and worker rights that can arise from an imbalance in power and a lack of participatory democracy.

== See also ==
- Timeline of labour issues and events in Canada
