= History of British Columbia =

The history of British Columbia covers the period from the arrival of Paleo-Indians thousands of years ago to the present day. Prior to European colonization, the lands encompassing present-day British Columbia were inhabited for millennia by a number of First Nations.

Several European expeditions to the region were undertaken in the late 18th and early 19th centuries. After the Oregon boundary dispute between the UK and US government was resolved in 1846, the colonies of Vancouver Island and colony of British Columbia were established; the former in 1849 and the latter in 1858. The two colonies were merged to form a single colony in 1866, which later joined the Canadian Confederation on 20 July 1871.

An influential historian of British Columbia, Margaret Ormsby, presented a structural model of the province's history in British Columbia: A History (1958); that has been adopted by numerous historians and teachers. Chad Reimer says, "in many aspects, it still has not been surpassed". Ormsby posited a series of propositions that provided the dynamic to the history of the province:

the ongoing pull between maritime and continental forces; the opposition between a "closed", hierarchical model of society represented by the Hudson's Bay Company and colonial officials, and the "open", egalitarian vision of English and Canadian settlers, and regional tensions between Vancouver Island and the mainland, metropolitan Vancouver and the hinterland interior.

== Indigenous peoples ==
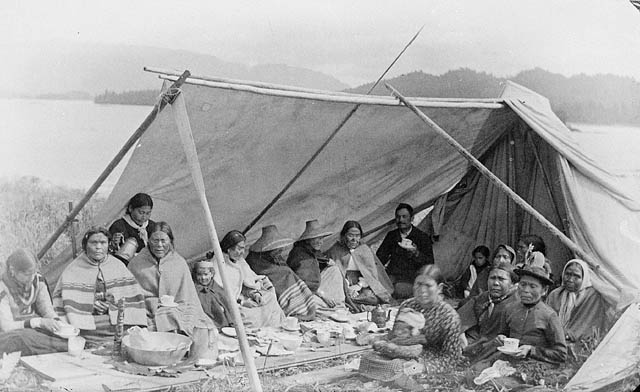
Tsimshian people c. 1892, Metlakatla

Human history in what has come to be known as British Columbia dates back thousands of years. Archaeology finds in British Columbia have been dated to as early as 13,543 years ago, with some exciting potential for underwater sites beginning to be detected.

The geography of the land influenced the cultural development of the peoples, and in places allowed for the cultural development of permanent villages, complex social institutions, and a huge range of languages. British Columbia (BC) is divided by anthropological theory into three cultural areas: the Northwest Coast, the Plateau, and the North. First Nations in each area developed customs and approaches to living that fit the resources in the region. Through much of British Columbia, salmon formed a substantial part of the diet where available. The term pre-contact is used to describe the period prior to contact between First Nations and European explorers. The exact time of contact varied according to circumstance but took place on the coast during the 1770s. In places in the Interior, it occurred later.

British Columbia, before the arrival of the Europeans, was home to many Indigenous peoples speaking more than 30 different languages, including Babine-Witsuwit'en, Danezaa (Beaver), Carrier, Chilcotin, Cree, Dene language, Gitxsan, Haida, Haisla, Halkomelem, Kaska, Kutenai, Kwak̓wala, Lillooet, Nisga'a, Nuu-chah-nulth, Nuxalk, Nsyilxcən, SENCOTEN, Sekani, Shuswap, Sinixt, Squamish, Tagish, Tahltan, Thompson, Tlingit, Tsetsaut, and Tsimshian. There was frequent contact between bands, and voyages across the straits of Georgia and Juan de Fuca were common.

The abundance of natural resources, such as salmon and cedar, enabled the development of a complex hierarchical society within coastal communities. With so much food being available, the peoples of the coastal regions could focus their time on other pursuits such as art, politics, and warfare.

== Early European explorers ==
The first European visitors to present-day British Columbia were Spanish sailors and other European sailors who sailed for the Spanish crown. There is some evidence that the Greek-born Juan de Fuca, who sailed for Spain and explored the West coast of North America in the 1590s, might have reached the passageway between Washington State and Vancouver Island – today known as the Strait of Juan de Fuca. (A later British explorer named Charles William Barkley named the passage after Juan de Fuca's reputed visit.)

=== Spanish expeditions ===
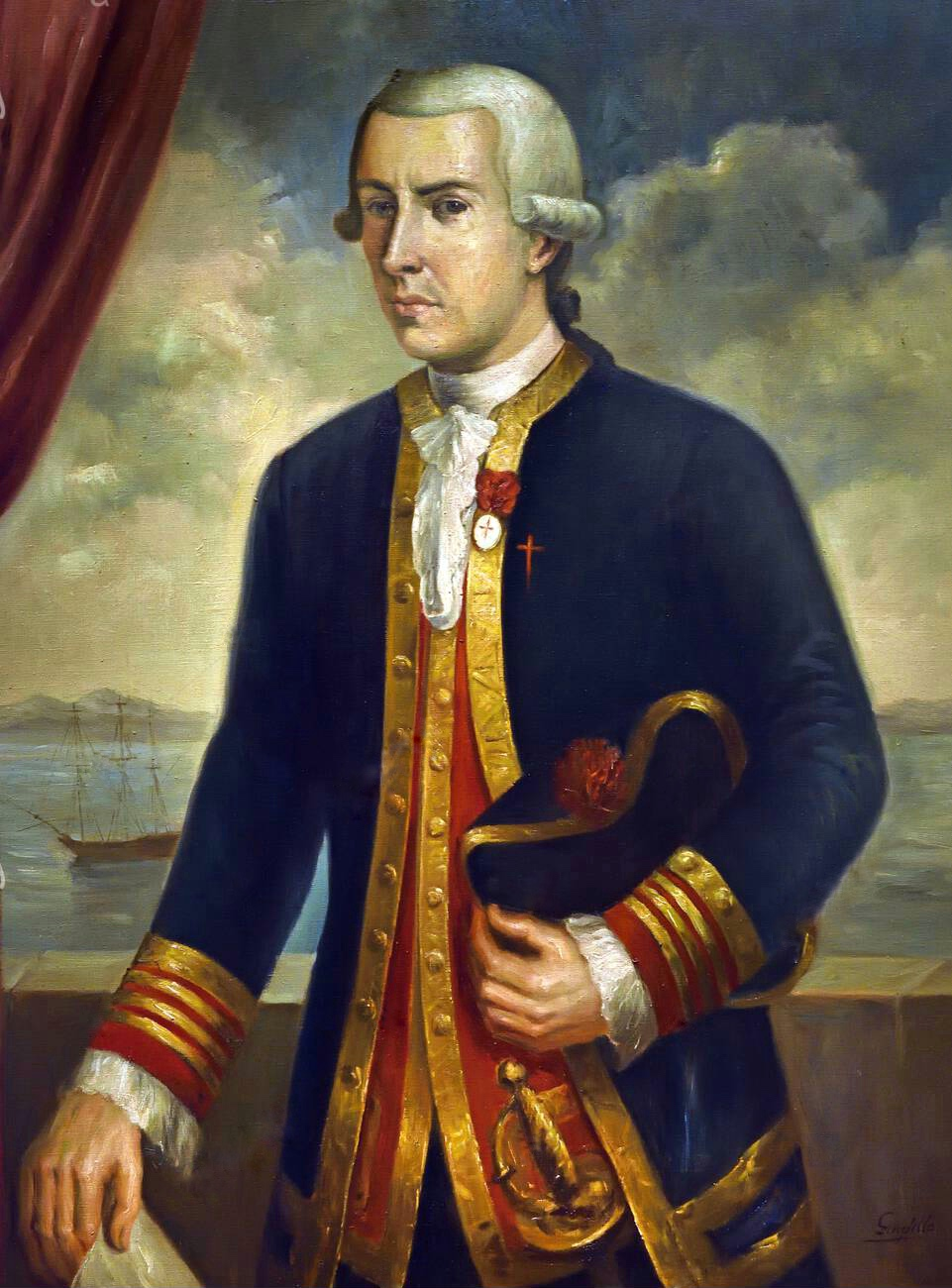
Juan Francisco de la Bodega y Quadra, a Spanish naval officer who was a part of a naval expedition to the region in 1775

While there is a theory and some evidence that Francis Drake may have explored the British Columbia Coast in 1579, it is conventionally claimed that it was Juan Francisco de la Bodega y Quadra who completed the first documented voyage, which took place in 1775. In doing so, Quadra reasserted the Spanish claim for the whole of the Pacific coast, first made by Vasco Núñez de Balboa in 1513, who declared the whole of the Pacific and its shores as part of the Spanish Empire. Quadra sailed over Sonora Reef, named after his boat, on Destruction Island in 1775. Some of his crew were murdered by the cannibal natives on the beach, and they attempted to board his ship until his remaining crew destroyed them with cannon fire. Quadra left the coast of Washington and sailed to Sitka, Alaska, but he did not make landfall or "discover" British Columbia.

In 1774, the Spanish navigator Juan José Pérez Hernández, a native of Mallorca, sailed from San Blas, Nueva Galicia (modern-day Nayarit), with instructions to reach 60° north latitude to discover possible Russian settlements and take possession of the lands for the Spanish Crown. Hernández reached 55° north latitude, becoming the first European to sight Haida Gwaii and Vancouver Island. He traded with the natives near Estevan Point, although apparently without landing. The expedition was forced to return to Nueva Galicia, due to the lack of provisions.

Since Pérez Hernández's first expedition failed to achieve its objective, the Spanish organized a second expedition in 1775 with the same goal. This expedition was commanded by Bruno de Heceta on board the Santiago, piloted by Pérez Hernández, and accompanied by Juan Francisco de la Bodega y Quadra in La Sonora. After illnesses, storms, and other troubles had affected the expedition, de Heceta returned to Nueva Galicia, while Quadra kept on a northward course, ultimately reaching 59° North in what today is Sitka, Alaska. During this expedition, the Spanish made sure to land several times and formally claim the lands for the Spanish Crown, while verifying the absence of Russian settlements along the coast.

=== British exploration and the Nootka Crisis ===
Three years later, in 1778, the Royal Navy captain James Cook arrived in the region, searching for the Northwest Passage and landed at Nootka Sound on Vancouver Island, where he and his crew traded with the Nuu-chah-nulth First Nation. Upon trading his goods for sea otter pelts, his crew in turn traded them for an enormous profit in Macau on their way back to Britain. This led to an influx of traders to the British Columbian coast, and ongoing economic contact with the aboriginal peoples there. In 1788, John Meares, an English navigator and explorer, sailed from China and explored Nootka Sound and the neighbouring coasts. He bought some land from a local chief named Maquinna and built a trading post there.

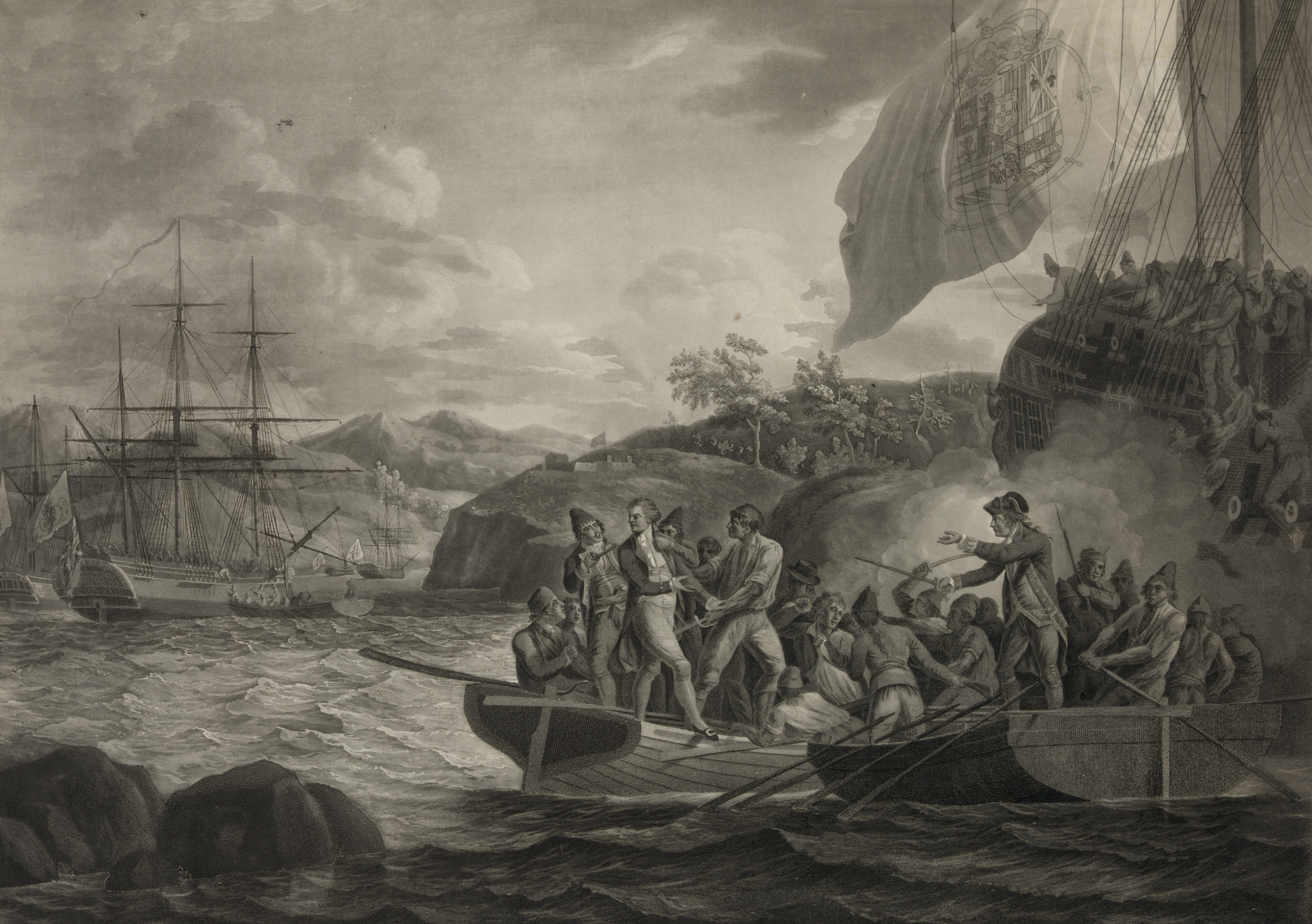
The seizure of James Colnett by Spanish forces, one of several incidents that led to the Nootka Crisis

Two years later, in 1789, the Spanish commander Esteban José Martínez, a native of Seville, established a settlement and started building a fort in Friendly Cove, Nootka Sound, which was named Fort San Miguel. This territory was already considered as part of New Spain by the Spanish due to the previous explorations of the region. Upon Martinez's arrival, a number of British ships were seized, including those of Captain Meares. This originated the Nootka Crisis, which almost led to a war between Britain and Spain. Some months later, Manuel Antonio Flórez, Viceroy of New Spain, ordered a Francisco de Eliza to rebuild the fort. The expedition, composed of three ships, the Concepción, under the command of De Eliza, the San Carlos, under the command of Salvador Fidalgo and the Princesa Real, under the command of Manuel Quimper, sailed in early 1790 from San Blas in Nueva Galicia and arrived at Nootka Sound in April of that year. The expedition had many Catalan volunteers from the First Free Company of Volunteers of Catalonia, commanded by Pere d'Alberní, a native of Tortosa. The expedition rebuilt the fort, which had been dismantled after Martínez abandoned it. The rebuilt fort included several defensive constructions as well as a vegetable garden to ensure the settlement had food supplies. The Catalan volunteers left the fort in 1792. The Nootka Crisis however ended very much in favour of the British after the Spanish capitulated to British terms. Spanish influence in the region ended in 1795 after the Nootka Convention came into force.

=== Later British expeditions (1790s–1821) ===
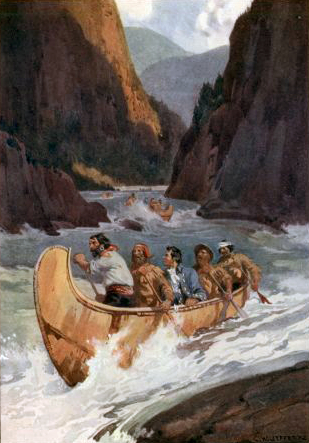
Depiction of voyageurs along the Fraser River in 1808 by Charles William Jefferys

Subsequently, European explorer-merchants from the east started to discover British Columbia. Three figures dominate the early history of mainland British Columbia: Alexander Mackenzie, Simon Fraser, and David Thompson. As employees of the North West Company, the three were primarily concerned with discovering a practicable river route to the Pacific, specifically via the Columbia River, for the extension of the North American fur trade. In 1793, Mackenzie became the first European to reach the Pacific overland north of the Rio Grande. He and his crew entered the region through the Rocky Mountains via the Peace River, reaching the ocean at North Bentinck Arm, near present-day Bella Coola. Shortly thereafter, Mackenzie's companion, John Finlay, founded the first permanent European settlement in British Columbia, Fort St. John, located at the junction of the Beatton and Peace Rivers.

Simon Fraser was the next to try to find the course of the Columbia. During his expedition of 1805–09, Fraser and his crew, including John Stuart, explored much of the British Columbia interior, establishing several forts (Hudson's Hope, Trout Lake Fort, Fort George, Fort Fraser, and Fort St. James). Fraser's expedition took him down the river that now bears his name, to the site of present-day Vancouver. Although both Mackenzie and Fraser reached the Pacific, they found the routes they took impassable for trade. It was David Thompson who found the Columbia River and followed it down to its mouth in 1811. He was unable to establish a claim, however, for the American explorers Lewis and Clark had already claimed the territory for the United States of America six years earlier. The American Fur Company of John Jacob Astor had founded Fort Astoria just months before Thompson arrived, though within a year the local staff at Astoria sold the fort and others in the region to the North West Company, which renamed it, Fort George. Though "returned" to US hands as a result of treaty complications at the end of the War of 1812, this meant only there was a parallel US fort adjacent to the NWC one, which was the more prosperous of the two. Following the forced merger of the North West Company and Hudson's Bay Company in 1821, Fort Vancouver was established as the new regional headquarters.

== From fur trade districts to colonies (1821–1858) ==
The arrival of Europeans began to intensify in the mid-19th century, as fur traders entered the area to harvest sea otters. Although technically a part of British North America, British Columbia was largely run by the Hudson's Bay Company after its merger with the North West Company in 1821. The Central Interior of the region was organized into the New Caledonia District, a name that came to be generally attributed to the mainland as a whole. It was administered from Fort St. James, about 150 kilometres (93 mi) northwest of present-day Prince George. The Interior south of the Thompson River and north of California was named by the company the Columbia District, and was administered first from Fort Vancouver (present-day Vancouver, Washington).

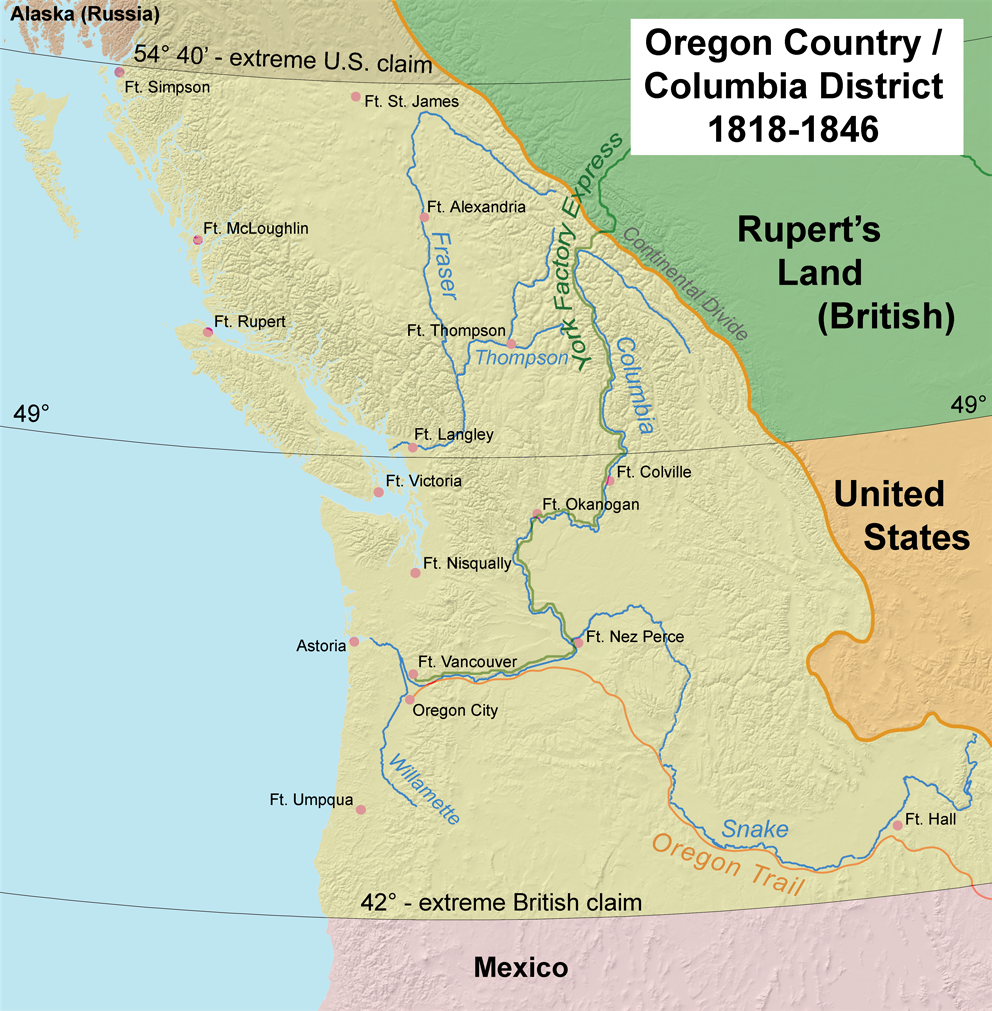
Map of the Columbia District / Oregon Country, a disputed region between the Americans and British during the early 19th century

Throughout the 1820s and 1830s, the HBC controlled nearly all trading operations in the Pacific Northwest, based out of the company headquarters at Fort Vancouver on the Columbia River. Although authority over the region was nominally shared by the United States and Britain through the Anglo-American Convention of 1818, company policy, enforced via Chief Factor John McLoughlin of the company's Columbia District, was to discourage any settlement, including US settlement, of the territory. The company's effective monopoly on trade virtually forbade any settlement in the region. It established Fort Boise in 1834 (in present-day southwestern Idaho) to compete with the American Fort Hall, 483 km (300 mi) to the east. In 1837, it purchased Fort Hall, also along the route of the Oregon Trail, where the outpost director displayed the abandoned wagons of discouraged settlers to those seeking to move west along the trail.

Fort Vancouver was the nexus for the fur trade on the Pacific Coast; its influence reached from the Rocky Mountains to the Hawaiian Islands, and from Alaska into Mexican-controlled California. At its pinnacle, Fort Vancouver watched over 34 outposts, 24 ports, six ships, and 600 employees. Also, for many primarily American settlers, the fort became the last stop on the Oregon Trail as they could get supplies before starting their homestead.

By 1843 the Hudson's Bay Company operated numerous posts in the Columbia Department, including Fort Vancouver, Fort George (Astoria), Fort Nisqually, Fort Umpqua, Fort Langley, Fort Colville, Fort Okanogan, Fort Kamloops, Fort Alexandria, Flathead Post, Kootanae House, Fort Boise, Fort Hall, Fort Simpson, Fort Taku, Fort McLoughlin (in Milbanke Sound), Fort Stikine, as well as a number of others.

A very high degree of linguistic variation occurs in BC; a response to this was the development of a trade jargon, Chinook Jargon. Not a complete language, it was used in trade, governance, and some early writings, for example, hymns.

By 1811 John Jacob Astor had founded Astoria, and ten years later the Hudson's Bay Company had established itself on the Columbia. In the meantime, the explorers and traders had been coming by land. Somewhere and sometime during this period the existence of the (Chinook) Jargon became known. All the Indians talked it to each other and resorted to it in their conversations with the whites. Knowledge of this trade language became a necessary part of the trader's equipment.

Fort Victoria was established as a trading post in 1843, both as a means to protect HBC interests, as well as to assert British claims to Vancouver Island and the adjacent Gulf Islands. The Gulf Islands and Strait of Juan de Fuca are the access point to Puget Sound as well as a fallback position in preparation for the "worst-case" scenario settlement of the dispute, in the face of manifest destiny. Increasing numbers of American settlers arriving on the Oregon Trail gave rise to the Oregon boundary dispute. The Hudson's Bay Company dominated and controlled all territory north of the Columbia River. The British position was that a fair division of the Columbia District was a boundary at the Columbia River.

In 1844, the United States Democratic Party asserted that the US had a legitimate claim to the entire Columbia District or Oregon Country, but President James Polk was prepared to draw the border along the 49th parallel, the longstanding US proposal. When the British rejected this offer, Polk broke off negotiations, and American expansionists reasserted the claim, coining slogans (most famously "Fifty-Four Forty or Fight!"). With the outbreak of the Mexican–American War diverting attention and resources, Polk was again prepared to compromise. The Oregon boundary dispute was settled in 1846 Treaty of Washington. The terms of the agreement established the border between British North America and the United States at the 49th parallel from the Rocky Mountains to the sea, the original American proposal, with all of Vancouver Island retained as British territory.

This effectively destroyed the geographical logic of the HBC's Columbia Department, since the lower Columbia River was the core and lifeline of the system. The US soon organized its portion as the Oregon Territory. The administrative headquarters of fur operations, and of the Columbia Department, then shifted north to Fort Victoria, which had been founded by James Douglas.

In 1849, the Crown Colony of Vancouver Island was created; and in 1851, James Douglas was appointed governor. Douglas, known as the father of British Columbia, established colonial institutions in Victoria. He started the process of expanding the economic base of the new colony by signing 14 treaties between 1850–1854 to purchase land for settlement and industrial development (coal deposits were known by the HWBC in the vicinities of Nanaimo and Fort Rupert). Subsequent native population clashes later in the 19th century along with economic upheaval and native wars allowed his political successors to be much less consistent with British principles, treaties, and laws.

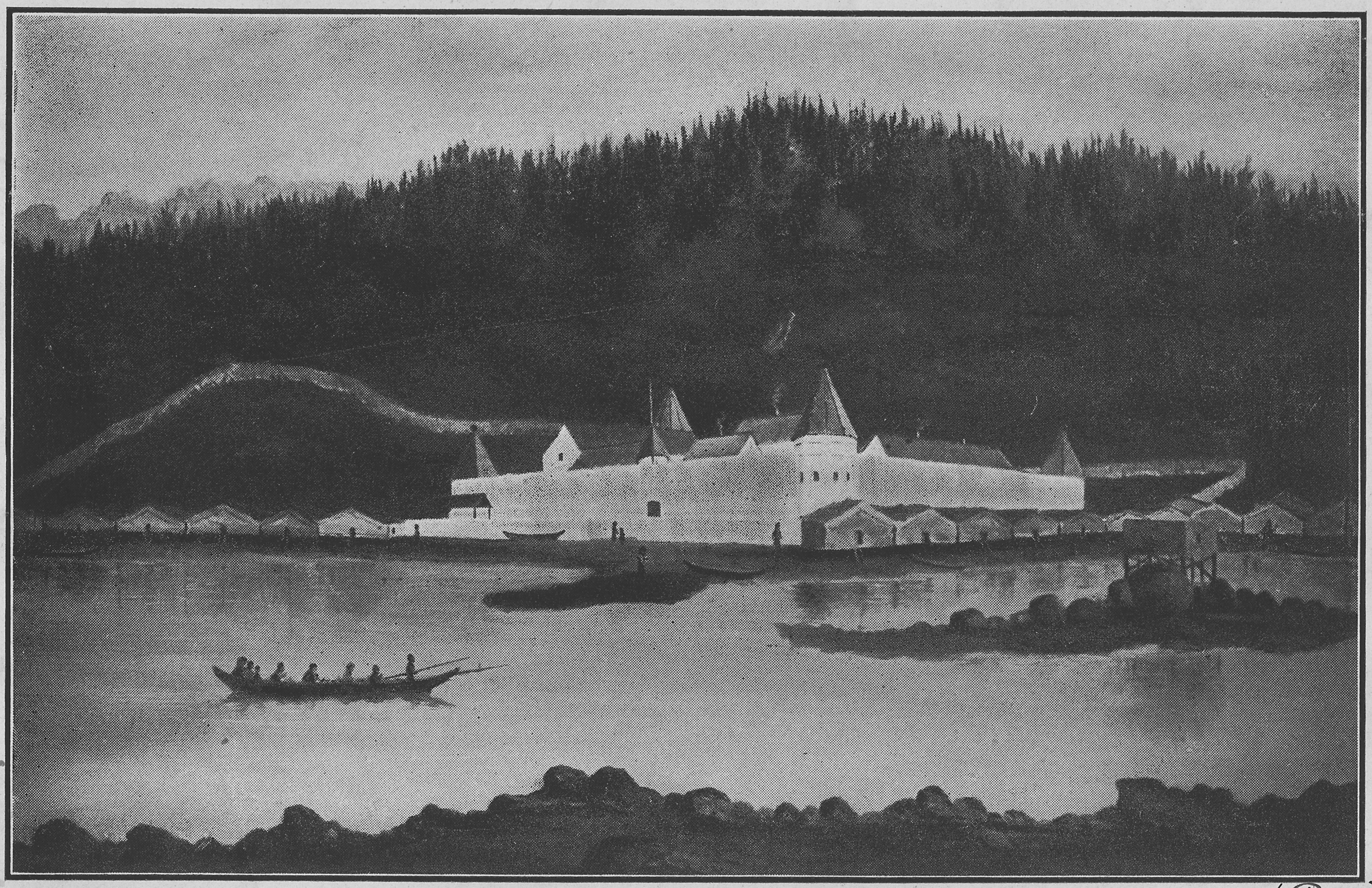
Fort Simpson in 1857. The fort was a HBC trading post in Lax Kw'alaams.

Meanwhile, on the mainland, New Caledonia continued to focus on the fur trade with few non-native inhabitants (mostly HBC employees and their families) under the administrative oversight of Douglas, who was also the HBC's regional chief executive. The Hudson's Bay Company like the previous French colony and North West Company of Montreal still officially discouraged settlement because it interfered with the lucrative fur trade. The fur trade was a mutually beneficial relationship between the local HBC trading fort and adjacent native tribes. American expansion and control of territory were predicated primarily by the settlement of the land not commercial relationships with the existing local population. The British made virtually no effort to assert sovereignty over the aboriginal peoples of the area. In accordance with the Royal Proclamation of 1763, large-scale settlement by non-aboriginal people was prohibited until the lands were surrendered by treaty.

== Colonial British Columbia (1858–1871) ==
In 1858, gold was found along the banks of the Thompson River just east of what is now Lytton, British Columbia, triggering the Fraser Canyon Gold Rush. When word got out to San Francisco about gold in British territory, Victoria quickly transformed into a tent city as prospectors, speculators, land agents, and outfitters flooded in from around the world, mostly via San Francisco. The Hudson's Bay Company's Fort Langley burgeoned economically as the staging point for many of the prospectors heading by boat to the Canyon.

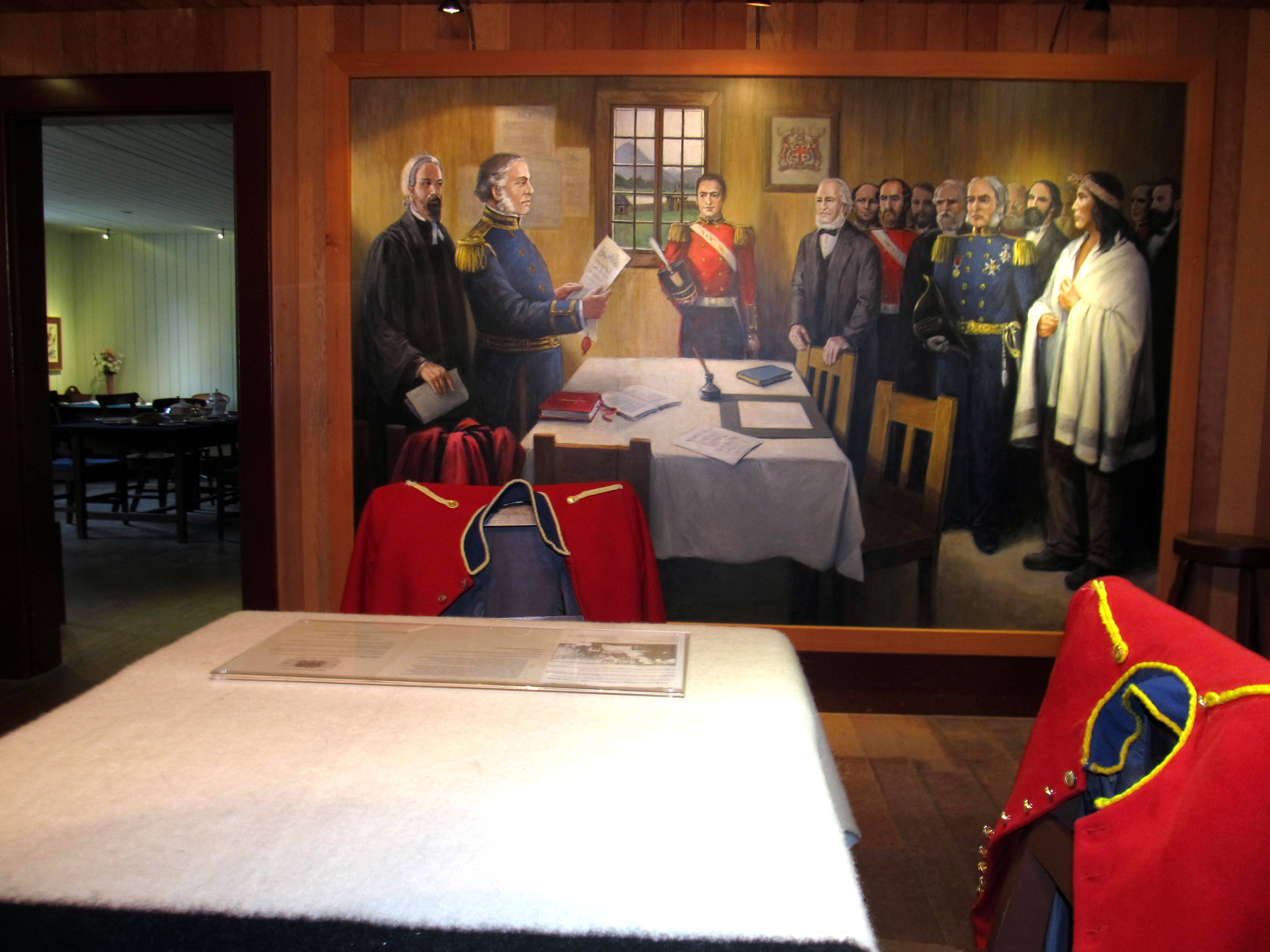
Depiction of the proclamation establishing the colony of British Columbia by Governor James Douglas at Fort Langley National Historic Site

A wide range of linguistic diversity among First Nations and explorers/traders made communication difficult. Trade jargon, initially used by First Nations expanded and changed to include words from English and French to become the Chinook Jargon. Not a complete language, the jargon became widespread among First Nations and early Europeans to enable communication and trade. Though little used today a significant number of place names in British Columbia derive from Chinook and early anthropologists sometimes recorded stories using the jargon.

At the time, the region was still not under formal colonial authority. Douglas, fearing challenges to the claim of British sovereignty in the region in the face of an influx of some 20,000 Americans, stationed a gunboat at the mouth of the Fraser in order to obtain licence fees from those seeking to head upstream. With the resolution of the Oregon Boundary Dispute, British interests, primarily the HBC, lost the governance of all territory between the 49th Parallel and the Columbia River, where there had been a sudden influx of American settlers 8 years previous.

When news of the Fraser Canyon Gold Rush reached London, the Colonial Office established the mainland as a Crown colony on 2 August 1858, naming it the Colony of British Columbia. Richard Clement Moody was hand-picked by the Colonial Office, under Edward Bulwer-Lytton, to establish British order and to transform the newly established Colony of British Columbia (1858–1866) into the British Empire's "bulwark in the farthest west" and "found a second England on the shores of the Pacific". Lytton desired to send to the colony "representatives of the best of British culture, not just a police force": he sought men who possessed "courtesy, high breeding and urbane knowledge of the world" and he decided to send Moody, whom the government considered to be the archetypal "English gentleman and British Officer" at the head of the Columbia Detachment, which was created by an act of the British Parliament, the British Columbia Government Act 1858 (21 & 22 Vict. c. 99), on 2 August 1858. The Engineers were believed to exemplify the qualities sought by the government.

=== Richard Clement Moody and the Royal Engineers ===
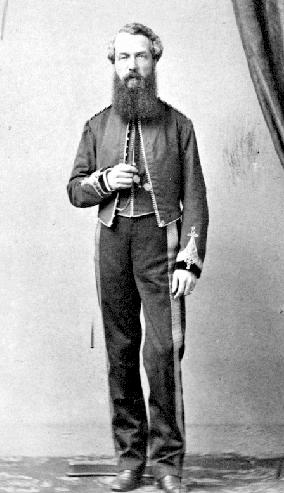
Colonel Richard Clement Moody in 1859

Moody arrived in British Columbia in December 1858, commanding the Royal Engineers, Columbia Detachment. He was sworn in as the first lieutenant governor of British Columbia and appointed Chief Commissioner of Lands and Works for British Columbia. On the advice of Lytton, Moody hired Robert Burnaby as his personal secretary, and the two became close friends.

Moody had hoped to begin immediately the foundation of a capital city, but upon his arrival at Fort Langley, he learned of an outbreak of violence at the settlement of Hill's Bar. This led to an incident popularly known as "Ned McGowan's War", where Moody led 22 Engineers and Judge Matthew Baillie Begbie to Yale to face down a group of rebellious American miners. Order was restored without further strict pain.

=== Founding New Westminster ===
In British Columbia, Moody "wanted to build a city of beauty in the wilderness" and planned his city as an iconic visual metaphor for British dominance, "styled and located with the objective of reinforcing the authority of the Crown and of the robe". Subsequent to the enactment of the Pre-emption Act of 1860, Moody settled the Lower Mainland. He selected the site and founded the new capital, New Westminster. He selected the site due to the strategic excellence of its position and the quality of its port. He was also struck by the majestic beauty of the site, writing in his letter to Blackwood:

The entrance to the Frazer is very striking—Extending miles to the right & left are low marsh lands (apparently of very rich qualities) & yet fr [sic] the Background of Superb Mountains—Swiss in outline, dark in woods, grandly towering into the clouds there is a sublimity that deeply impresses you. Everything is large and magnificent, worthy of the entrance to the Queen of England's dominions on the Pacific mainland. [...] My imagination converted the silent marshes into Cuyp-like pictures of horses and cattle lazily fattening in rich meadows in a glowing sunset. [...] The water of the deep clear Frazer was of a glassy stillness, not a ripple before us, except when a fish rose to the surface or broods of wild ducks fluttered away.

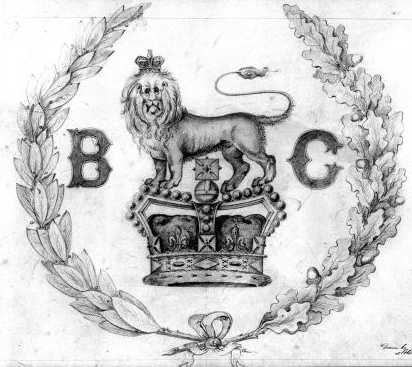
The royal crest of the colony of British Columbia, designed by Moody

Moody designed the first Coat of arms of British Columbia.

However, Lytton "forgot the practicalities of paying for clearing and developing the site and the town" and the efforts of Moody's Engineers were continuously hampered by insufficient funds, which, together with the continuous opposition of Douglas, whom Thomas Frederick Elliot described as "like any other fraud", "made it impossible for [Moody's] design to be fulfilled".

=== Feud between Moody and Governor James Douglas ===
Throughout his tenure in British Columbia, Moody was engaged in a feud with James Douglas, Governor of Vancouver Island, whose jurisdiction overlapped with his own.

Moody's position as chief commissioner and lieutenant governor was one of "higher prestige [and] lesser authority" than that of Douglas, despite Moody's superior social position in the judgement of the settlers. Moody had been selected by Lytton due to his possession of the quality of the "archetypal English gentleman and British Officer", his family was "eminently respectable": he was the son of Colonel Thomas Moody and of Martha Clement, who was a socially superior member of the planter class of the West Indies, including Demerara and the Guianas, in which Douglas's father and brothers owned less land and from which Douglas's 'a half-breed' mother originated.

Mary Moody, a descendant of the Hawks industrialist dynasty and of the armigerous Boyd merchant banking family, wrote on 4 August 1859 "it is not pleasant to serve under a Hudson's Bay Factor" and that the "Governor and Richard can never get on". In a letter to the Colonial Office of 27 December 1858, Moody boasts that he has "entirely disarmed [Douglas] of all jealously" Douglas repeatedly insulted the Engineers by attempting to assume their command and refusing to acknowledge their value in the nascent colony.

Margaret A. Ormsby, the author of the Dictionary of Canadian Biography entry for Moody (2002), condemns Moody for a contribution to the abortive development of the city. However, most other historians have exonerated Moody for the abortive development of the city and consider his achievement to be impressive, especially with regard to the perpetual insufficiency of funds and the personally motivated opposition of Douglas, whose opposition to the project continually retarded its development. Robert Edgar Cail, Don W. Thomson, Ishiguro, and Scott have praised Moody for his contribution, the latter accusing Ormsby of being "adamant in her dislike of Colonel Moody" despite the evidence, and almost all biographies of Moody, including those of the Institute of Civil Engineers, the Royal Engineers, and the British Columbia Historical Association, are flattering.

=== Other developments ===
Moody and the Royal Engineers also built an extensive road network, including what would become Kingsway, connecting New Westminster to False Creek, the North Road between Port Moody and New Westminster, and the Cariboo Road and Stanley Park. He named Burnaby Lake after his private secretary Robert Burnaby and named Port Coquitlam's 400-foot "Mary Hill" after his wife. As part of the surveying effort, several tracts were designated "government reserves", which included Stanley Park as a military reserve (a strategic location in case of an American invasion). The Pre-emption act did not specify conditions for distributing the land, so large parcels were snapped up by speculators, including 3,750 acres (1,517 hectares) by Moody himself. For this he was criticized by local newspapermen for land grabbing. Port Moody is named after him. It was established at the end of a trail that connected New Westminster with Burrard Inlet to defend New Westminster from potential attack from the US.

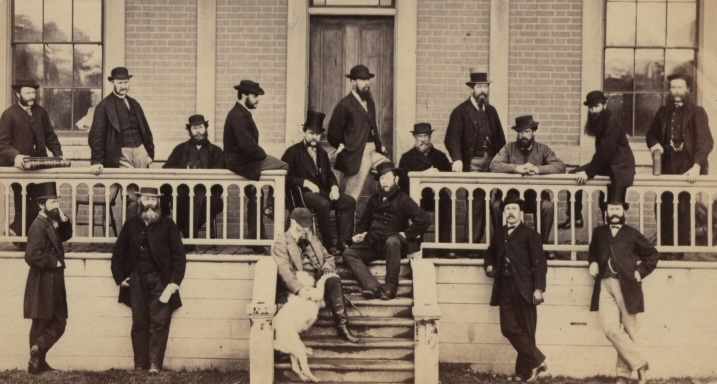
Members of the Legislative Council of British Columbia in Victoria, c. 1867

By 1862, the Cariboo Gold Rush, attracting an additional 5000 miners, was underway, and Douglas hastened construction of the Great North Road (commonly known now as the Cariboo Wagon Road) up the Fraser Canyon to the prospecting region around Barkerville. By the time of this gold rush, the character of the colony was changing, as a more stable population of British colonists settled in the region, establishing businesses, opening sawmills, and engaging in fishing and agriculture. With this increased stability, objections to the colony's absentee governor and the lack of responsible government began to be vocalized, led by the influential editor of the New Westminster British Columbian and future provincial premier, John Robson. A series of petitions requesting an assembly were ignored by Douglas and the colonial office until Douglas was eased out of office in 1864. Finally, the colony would have both an assembly and a resident governor.

Royal Engineers, Columbia Detachment was disbanded in July 1863. In the Moody family, only 22 men and 8 wives returned to England, while the rest, 130 sappers, elected to remain in BC. Scott contends that the departure of the Engineers "doomed" the development of the settlement and the fruition of Lytton's dream. Chartres Brew replaced Moody as land commissioner.

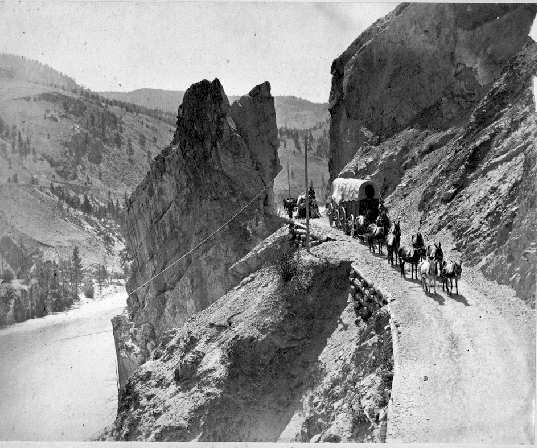
Horse drawn freight wagons on the Cariboo Road along the Thompson River, 1867

A second major gold rush in the Cariboo region of the colony occurred in 1861–64, in the midst of smaller ones, notably in the Omenica, Big Bend and on the Stikine. The influx of gold miners into BC's economy led to the creation of basic infrastructure in BC, most notably, the creation of the Cariboo Wagon Road which linked the Lower Mainland to the rich goldfields of Barkerville. However, the enormous costs of the road, and its predecessor the Douglas Road and services such as the Gold Escort, left BC in debt by the mid-1860s. In 1866, because of the massive debt leftover from the gold rush, the mainland and Vancouver Island became one colony named British Columbia, with its capital in Victoria.

On Vancouver Island settlement and industrial development took place along the shorelines. For example, see the 19th-century settlement in Comox or Colony of Vancouver Island.

=== Annexation debate ===
In 1867, there were three options open: to continue as a British colony, to be annexed by the United States, or to confederate with the newly formed Dominion of Canada. In Britain, many Little Englanders expected, or even hoped, that its North American colonies would depart from the British Empire. Admiral Joseph Denman told the Admiralty that British Columbia did not deserve Royal Navy protection, and advised the British government to "divest herself of these possessions by any means consistent with honor". Secretary of State for the Colonies Lord Granville stated his wish that British North America "would propose to be independent and annex themselves". The Times' view was the British consensus:

British Columbia is a long way off. ... With the exception of a limited official class it receives few immigrants from England, and a large proportion of its inhabitants consists of citizens of the United States who have entered it from the south. Suppose that the colonists met together and came to the conclusion that every natural motive of contiguity, the similarity of interests, and facility of administration induced them to think it more convenient to slip into the Union than into the Dominion. ... We all know that we should not attempt to withstand them.

Financially, becoming officially part of the United States made sense since British Columbia was economically essentially a satellite of San Francisco — the most important city of the entire American West and North America's Pacific coast — Washington, and Oregon, which provided all of the colony's supplies despite a substantial American tariff. American currency circulated widely in the colony, whose nearest British neighbours were Red River 2,000 miles to the east, and Hong Kong to the west. San Francisco's population in the 1860s exceeded 60,000, while Victoria's never rose above 4,000. All mail from British Columbia went through San Francisco, forcing the colony's post office to keep large quantities of American postage stamps. The opening of the American transcontinental railroad in 1869 made it possible to travel by ship from Victoria to San Francisco, then by train to Ottawa or Washington in just 24 days. With the gold now gone, most of the American miners had left, and the economic future did not look promising unless BC could join the very rapidly growing, rich economies of the Pacific states.

While American residents of British Columbia celebrated the United States' purchase of Alaska in 1867, having American territory to their north and south caused British residents' fears for the future of their colony to grow. Alaska was part of American Secretary of State William H. Seward's plan to incorporate the entire northwest Pacific Coast, chiefly for the long-term commercial advantages to the United States in terms of Pacific trade. Seward believed that the people in British Columbia wanted annexation and that Britain would accept this in exchange for the Alabama claims. In the event, Seward dropped the idea of exchange and accepted an arbitration plan that settled the Alabama claims for cash. When a false report circulated in April, soon after the Alaska news, that the British government was considering settling the claims by ceding the colony, a substantial annexation movement appeared supported by many residents and three of the colony's six newspapers.

Anti-confederationists, who were not necessarily annexationists, were the majority on Vancouver Island. That said, annexationists argued that the colony would never be able to negotiate with the United States a free trade agreement similar to the Reciprocity Treaty of 1854, and that annexation would end the disadvantage of the American tariff. Most Canadian-born residents supported confederation with their land of origin but were not very popular, as many in the colony believed that they sent their money home instead of spending it in British Columbia as the American-born colonists did. Residents of the mainland almost unanimously supported confederation with the rest of British North America; they argued that this would benefit the colony as Canada would soon negotiate another reciprocity treaty. Many British-born colonists were on both sides.

Representative Nathaniel P. Banks of Massachusetts' Annexation Bill of 1866 offered voluntary annexation to British North America, including territorial status for Vancouver Island and British Columbia together as the "territory of Columbia". The bill was unsuccessful, as was Senator Alexander Ramsey of Minnesota's 1867 proposal that the United States, as part of another reciprocity treaty with Canada, offer $6 million to the Hudson's Bay Company for the territory west of the 90th longitude. The US would assume British Columbia's $2 million debt, and subsidize the Northern Pacific Railway to build a road to Puget Sound. Two American military officers, who travelled throughout British Columbia for two months while arranging for the supply of occupation troops in Alaska, wrote a detailed report to Washington in November 1867 of their belief that a majority of residents supported annexation. They claimed that "[i]t did not become necessary in a single instance to broach the subject of the cession of that territory to the United States, for it was the constant theme of conversation". Employees of the Hudson's Bay Company were said to be especially supportive, although they and many others could not make their opinion public because of fears of being denounced as disloyal. A majority of British Columbians never publicly supported American annexation, however, and support for joining Canada grew over time; in particular, annexationists failed to persuade the anti-confederation Hudson's Bay Company officials and their friends that dominated Vancouver Island politics. Accusations that "American gold" and "American greenbacks" funded "renegade Englishmen" likely hurt annexation support; whether the US officers' belief of the existence of widespread covert support was correct, by October 1867 annexation no longer appeared as a topic in British Columbia newspapers or documents.

Until the Alaska Purchase and the new Dominion status (which were almost simultaneous), the British had been indifferent to the fate of British Columbia. London realized its value as a base for its imperial trade opportunities in the Pacific and the need of the Royal Navy for a station in the region. By 1868 public opinion was likely on the confederation side. Annexationists (or, at least, anti-confederationists) were in control of the Legislative Council of British Columbia, however, and in February 1869 passed a resolution opposing confederation; until his death the colonial governor, Frederick Seymour, also opposed confederation. Successor Anthony Musgrave supported confederation (after being unsuccessful in bringing Newfoundland into Canada) but due to an accident was delayed in his duties; meanwhile, annexation support revived during the winter of 1869–1870. One hundred and four individuals, about one percent of the white population of the colony, signed an 1869 petition to President Ulysses S. Grant asking for annexation. While there is no reason to believe that they accurately represented the majority opinion, many colonists viewed Washington and London as equal competitors for British Columbia's loyalty depending on who offered more incentives, while Ottawa was more foreign and less familiar.

In August 1869, Granville communicated London's new view of British Columbia when he wrote to Musgrave, "I have no hesitation in stating that [support of confederation] is also the opinion of Her Majesty's Government." In February 1870 Musgrave successfully persuaded the Legislative Council to pass a resolution supporting confederation with Canada. Many British-born colonists now supported confederation as the best way to maintain a connection with Britain. By April the Victoria Colonist reported that a mass meeting in Victoria supported confederation while "the vaguest hint in the direction of annexation was met with a howl of execration". Musgrave proposed an attractive plan for joining Canada, with the Dominion assuming the colony's debt and building a new Canadian transcontinental railway that would eliminate the reliance on the American railroad. The United States was focused on issues of Reconstruction and few Americans considered Seward's plan to expand Manifest Destiny to the Pacific.

== Entry into Canada (1871–1900) ==
Both the depressed economic situation – arising from the collapse of the gold rushes – and a desire for the establishment of truly responsible and representative government, led to enormous domestic pressure for British Columbia to join the Canadian Confederation, which had been proclaimed in 1867. The Confederation League, spearheaded by three future premiers of the province — Amor De Cosmos, Robert Beaven, and John Robson — took a leading role in pushing the Colony of British Columbia towards this goal. And so on 20 July 1871, British Columbia became the sixth province to join Canada. In return for British Columbia entering Confederation, Canada absorbed BC's massive debt and promised to build a railway from Montreal to the Pacific coast within 10 years.

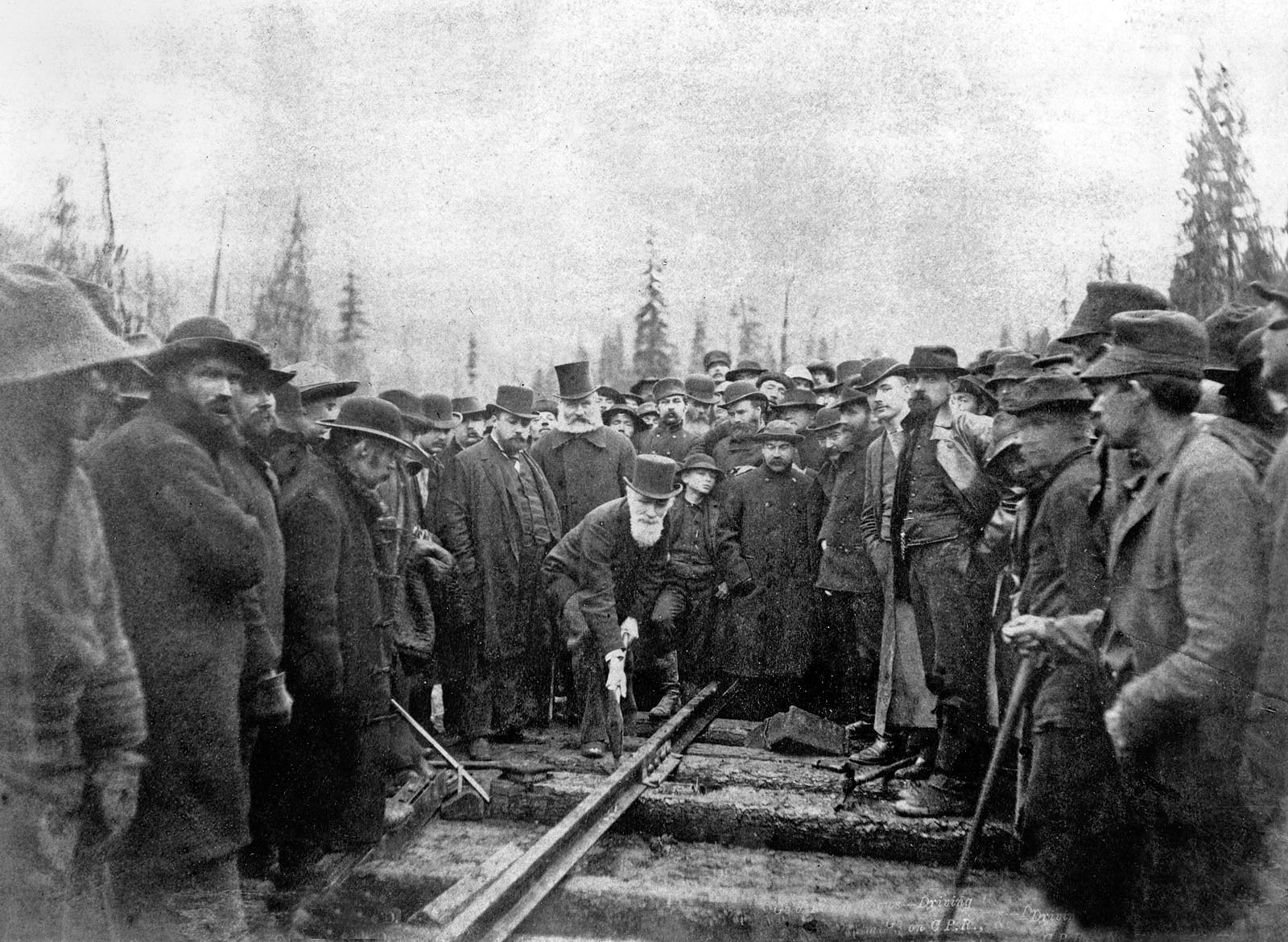
Donald Alexander Smith drives in the last spike for the Canadian Pacific Railway in 1885.

Contrary to popular belief British Columbia did not demand a transcontinental railway as a condition of confederation; its delegates expected a wagon road, but John A. Macdonald's national government proposed the railway as a substitute, with Ottawa and London viewing it as a way of connecting not just British Columbia but the prairies with the rest of the British Empire. The promise of a railway became, however, the most important reason for British Columbia to stay within Canada. The provincial legislature threatened to secede in 1878 because Macdonald's successor Alexander Mackenzie, whose Liberal Party had opposed the railway, attempted to modify the promise; Macdonald's return to power that year likely kept British Columbia from departing Canada. In fulfillment of the promise, the last spike of the Canadian Pacific Railway was driven in at Craigellachie on 7 November 1885. No good road yet existed between British Columbia and other Canadian provinces; until the completion of BC Route "A" in 1928, automobiles had to enter the United States to travel from BC to eastern Canada.

The mining frontier in BC led to the development of many mines and smelters, mostly through American investment. One of the world's largest smelters still exists as of 2021 in Trail. The capital and work to be found in BC during the turn of the 19th century to the 20th century led to the founding of several new towns in BC such as Nelson, Nakusp, Slocan, Kimberley, Castlegar, Rossland, and Salmo. A large coal empire run by Robert Dunsmuir (1825–1889) and by his son and later BC premier (in office: 1900–1902), James Dunsmuir, developed on Vancouver Island during this era.

As the economy on the mainland continued to improve as a result of improved transportation and increased settlement, other resource-based economic activity began to flourish. Throughout the latter half of the nineteenth century, fishing, forestry, and farming (including the planting of extensive orchards in the Okanagan region) became the "three F's" on which the province built its economy — a situation that persisted well into the late twentieth century.

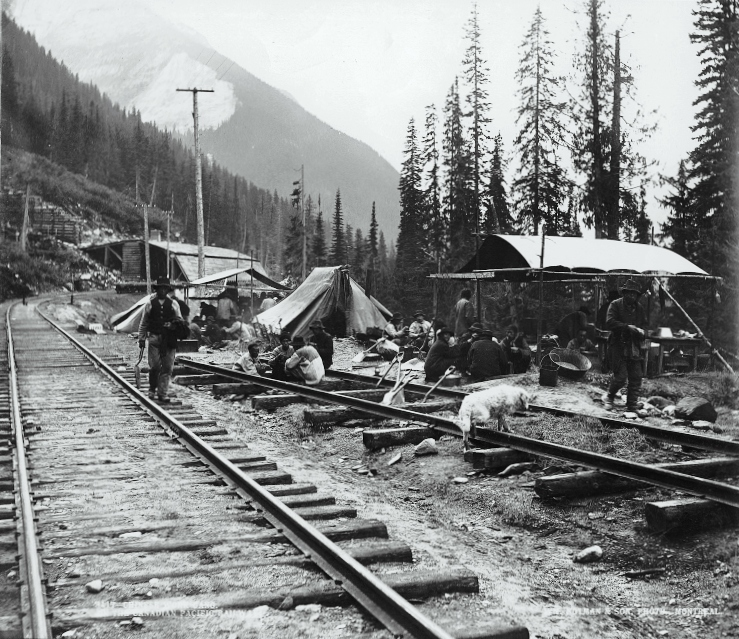
Chinese workers working on a rail line in Glacier National Park, 1889

With the booming economy came the expansion of the original fur-trading posts into thriving communities (such as Victoria, Nanaimo, and Kamloops). It also led to the establishment of new communities, such as Yale, New Westminster, and — most notably, though a latecomer — Vancouver. The product of the consolidation of the burgeoning mill-towns of Granville and Hastings Mill – located near the mouth of the Fraser on Burrard Inlet in the later 1860s – Vancouver was incorporated in 1886 following its selection as the railhead for the Canadian Pacific Railway. Despite a devastating fire that all but wiped out the city three months later, Vancouver quickly became the largest city in the province, its ports conveying both the resource wealth of the province – as well as that transported from the prairie provinces by rail – to markets overseas. Vancouver's status as the principal city in the province has endured, augmented by growth in the surrounding municipalities of Richmond, Burnaby, Surrey, Delta, Coquitlam, and New Westminster. As of 2016, Metro Vancouver is the third most populous metropolitan area in Canada, behind Toronto and Montreal.

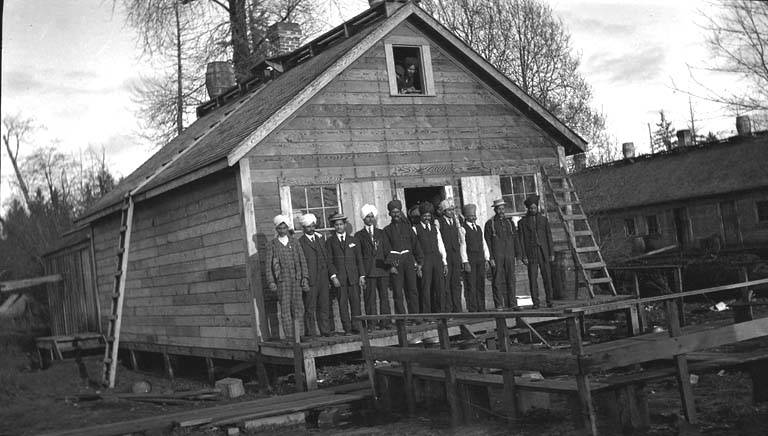
Punjabi Sikh workers at a lumber camp, c. 1914

In the late 19th century British Columbia's ethnic diversity began to develop significantly, as immigration was not fed entirely by European countries. Chinese and Japanese emigrants made many coastal settlements home, beginning in the 1850s, and became increasingly more evident in the 1880s. Indian emigrants also began sailing to British Columbia in the following years and would help develop the provincial logging industry, founding mill towns such as Paldi on Vancouver Island.

== 20th century ==
Since the days of the fur trade, British Columbia's economy has been based on natural resources, particularly fishing, logging and mining. From the canneries to the mills and mines, BC's resource sector was increasingly the domain of large commercial interests.

With industrialization and economic growth, workers arrived to join in the seemingly boundless prosperity. Increasingly, these workers came from Asia as well as Europe. The mix of cultures and diversity was a source of strength, but also, often, of conflict. The early part of the 20th century was a time of great change and talk between immigrants and the First Nations, all of whom found their lives changing rapidly.

=== Rise of the labour movement ===
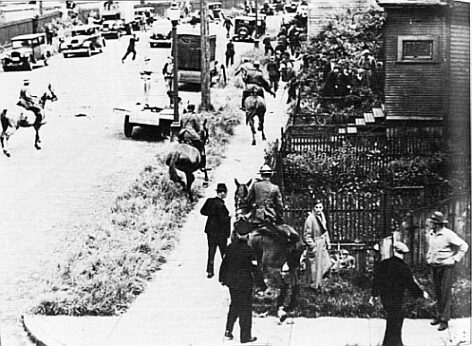
Mounted police chase strikers during a docker's strike at Ballantyne Pier in Vancouver, June 1935.

The dominance of the economy by big business was accompanied by an often militant labour movement. The first major sympathy strike was in 1903 when railway employees struck against the CPR for union recognition. Labour leader Frank Rogers was killed while picketing at the docks by CPR police during that strike, becoming the British Columbia movement's first martyr. Canada's first general strike occurred following the death of another labour leader, Ginger Goodwin, in 1918, at the Cumberland coal mines on Vancouver Island. A lull in industrial tensions through the later 1920s came to an abrupt end with the Great Depression. Most of the 1930s strikes were led by Communist Party organizers. That strike wave peaked in 1935 when unemployed men flooded the city to protest conditions in the relief camps run by the military in remote areas throughout the province. After two tense months of daily and disruptive protesting, the relief camp strikers decided to take their grievances to the federal government and embarked on the On-to-Ottawa Trek, but their commandeered train was met by a gatling gun at Hatzic, just east of Mission City, and the strikers arrested and interned in work camps for the duration of the Depression.

=== Race and ethnic relations ===
At the time that BC was settled the ideology of the British Empire, and of many of its colonial settlers was based on an assumption of superiority, often racial superiority based on the pseudo-science of Race. Racism and a desire to create a white colony were widespread. The scientific thinking of Charles Darwin was used to develop a theory of the races, known as social Darwinism, which is today completely discredited. Under this ideology, restrictive laws were passed, by both federal and provincial levels of government. The potlatch ban outlawed First Nations cultural and spiritual practices, non-white people were denied the vote – specifically First Nations, Chinese, Indians, and Japanese people.

During the 20th century, many immigrant groups arrived in British Columbia and in the 21st centuray, Vancouver is the second most ethnically diverse city in Canada, after Toronto. Vancouver, in particular, has a long history of Chinese and Indian settlement; today, ethnic Chinese and Indians form over 30 percent of the city's population.

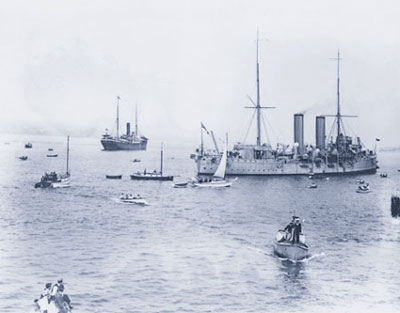
The Komagata Maru and HMCS Rainbow, July 1914

In 1886, a head tax was imposed on the Chinese, which reached as much as $500 per person to enter Canada by 1904. By 1923 the government passed the Chinese Immigration Act, which prohibited all Chinese immigration until 1947. Sikhs from British India had to face an amended Immigration Act in 1908 that required Indians to have $200 on arrival in Canada, and immigration would be allowed only if the passenger had arrived by continuous journey from India, which was impossible. Perhaps the most famous incident of anti-Indian racism in BC was in 1914 when the Komagata Maru arrived in Vancouver Harbour with 376 Punjabi Sikhs, Muslims, and Hindus aboard, of whom only 20 were allowed entry. The Komagata Maru spent two months in the harbour while the Khalsa Society went through the courts to appeal their case. The Khalsa Society also kept the passengers on the Komagata Maru alive during those two months. When the case was lost, HMCS Rainbow, a Royal Canadian Navy cruiser, escorted the Komagata Maru out to sea while thousands of Caucasians cheered from the seawall of Stanley Park.

=== Interwar period and World War II ===
Alcohol was prohibited in British Columbia from 1917 to 1921. A referendum in 1916 asked BC citizens whether they approved of making alcohol illegal (the other question was whether women should have the right to vote). The contested results rejecting prohibition led to a major political scandal that subsequently saw the referendum being overturned and alcohol prohibited. However, by 1921, the failures of prohibition were so apparent—a thriving black market, arbitrary (often class- and race-based) enforcement and punishment, rampant corruption—that alcohol was established as a commodity subject to government regulation and taxation as it is today. US prohibition in the 1920s and early 1930s led to a thriving business of producing and smuggling alcohol to quench the thirst of BC's southern neighbours. Many of Vancouver's richest families built or consolidated their fortunes in the rum-running business. Some compare today's robust cannabis-growing industry in BC to this earlier era.

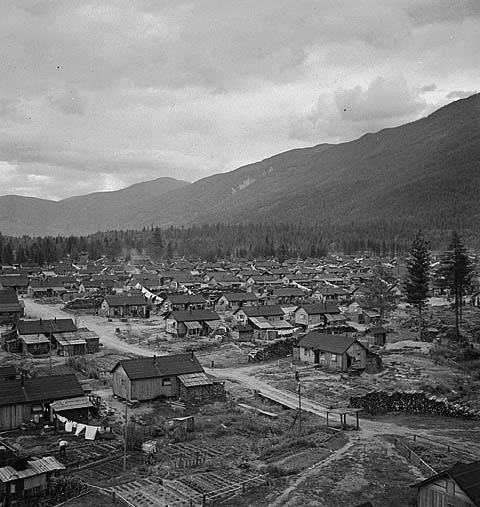
Internment camp for Japanese Canadians during World War II

The end of the 1920s and the end of prohibition in the US, combined with the onset of the Great Depression, plunged the province into economic destitution during the 1930s. Widespread unemployment among veterans was hardened by many of the available jobs being taken by European immigrants and disgruntled veterans organized a range of "soldier parties" to represent their interests. These were variously named Soldier-Farmer, Soldier-Labour, and Farmer-Labour Parties. These formed the basis of the fractured labour-political spectrum that would generate a host of fringe political parties, including those who would eventually form the Co-operative Commonwealth Federation and the early Social Credit splinter groups. Compounding the already dire local economic situation, tens of thousands of men from colder parts of Canada moved into Vancouver, creating huge hobo jungles around False Creek and the Burrard Inlet rail yards. This included the old Canadian Pacific Railway mainline right-of-way through the heart of Downtown Vancouver. Increasingly desperate times led to intense political efforts, an occupation of the main post office at Granville and Hastings, which was violently put down by the police, and an effective imposition of martial law on the docks for almost three years due to the Battle of Ballantyne Pier. A Vancouver contingent for the On-to-Ottawa Trek was organized and seized a train, which was loaded with thousands of men bound for the capital but was met by a Gatling gun straddling train tracks at Mission. All the men were arrested and sent to work camps for the duration of the Depression. There were signs of an economic return towards the end of the 1930s, and the onset of World War II transformed the national economy, ending the Depression.

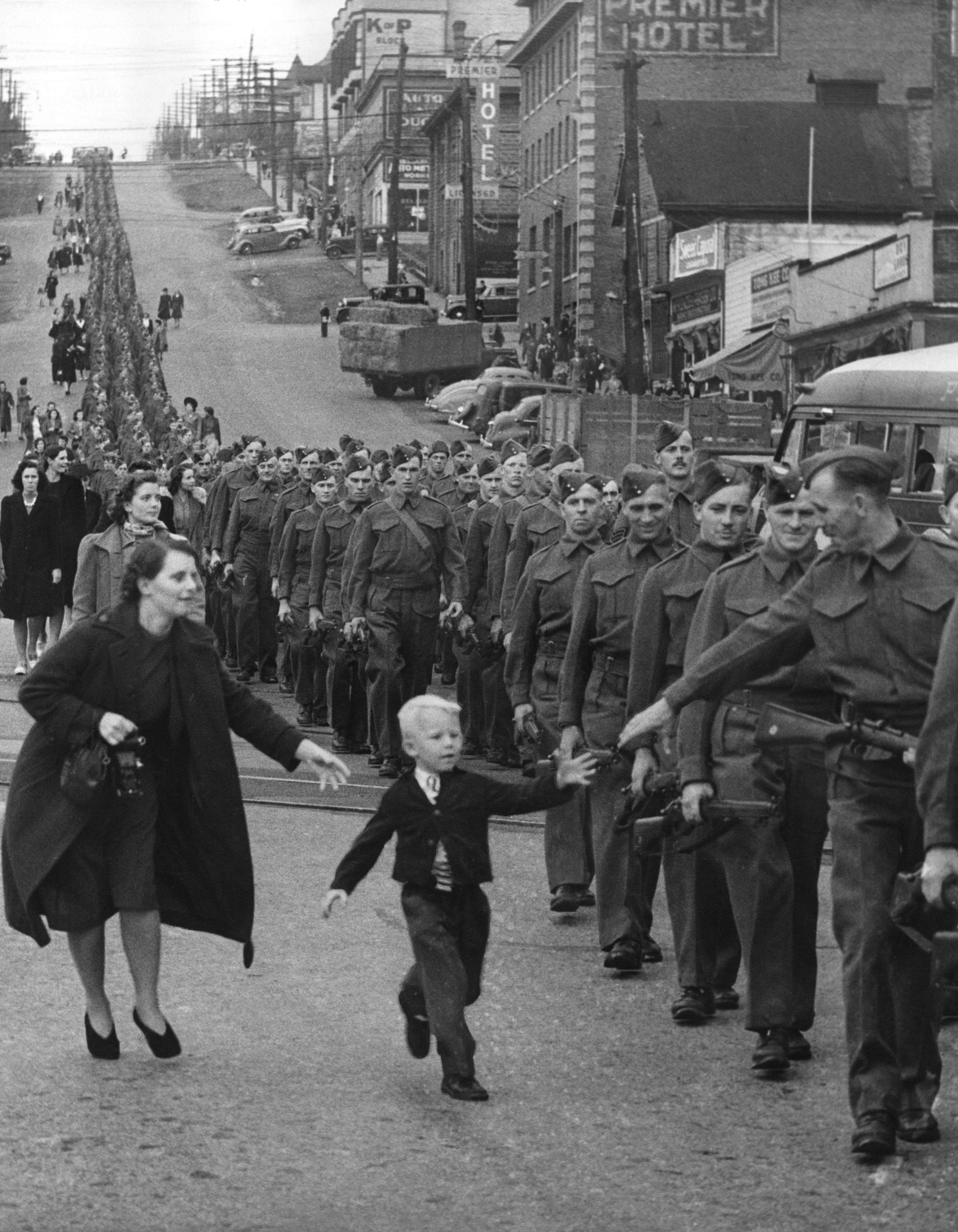
Wait for Me, Daddy (photo by Claude P. Dettloff): the BC Regiment marching in New Westminster, October 1940

British Columbia's location on the Pacific Ocean has resulted in closer relations with East Asia and South Asia. These relations have often caused friction between cultures which has sometimes escalated into racist animosity towards those of Asian descent. This was manifest during the Second World War when many people of Japanese descent were relocated or interned in the Interior region of the province. A Pacific Command was created in 1942 also and was disbanded in 1945. During the war, a range of coastal defences were constructed, including harbour defences for Vancouver. Today's Museum of Anthropology at UBC sits atop the foundation for gun batteries that were used to command Vancouver Harbour approaches.

Militia units from southern BC provided cadres for many regiments that eventually fought in Europe. The Rocky Mountain Rangers sent a battalion to fight the Japanese in the Battle of the Aleutian Islands in 1943. Thousands more British Columbians volunteered for the Royal Canadian Navy and Royal Canadian Air Force. Two soldiers, Ernest Alvia Smith and John Keefer Mahony, were awarded the Victoria Cross for actions with BC-based regiments in Italy.

=== Coalition and the post-war boom ===
During World War II the mainstream BC Liberal and BC Conservative parties united in a formal coalition government under new Liberal leader John Hart, who replaced Duff Pattullo when the latter failed to win a majority in the 1941 election. While the Liberals won the most seats, they actually received fewer votes than the socialist Co-operative Commonwealth Federation (CCF). Pattullo was unwilling to form a coalition with the rival Conservatives led by Royal Maitland and was replaced by Hart, who formed a coalition cabinet made up of five Liberal and three Conservative ministers. The CCF was invited to join the coalition but refused.

The pretext for continuing the coalition after the end of war was to prevent the CCF, which had won a surprise victory in Saskatchewan in 1944, from ever coming to power in British Columbia. The CCF's popular vote was high enough in the 1945 election that they were likely to have won three-way contests and could have formed government; however, the coalition prevented that by uniting the anti-socialist vote.

In the post-war environment, the government initiated a series of infrastructure projects, notably the completion of Highway 97 north of Prince George to the Peace River Block, including a section called the John Hart Highway. They also introduced public hospital insurance.

In 1947, Byron Ingemar Johnson became leader of the Coalition. The Conservatives had wanted their new leader Herbert Anscomb to be premier, but the Liberals in the Coalition refused. Johnson led the coalition to the highest percentage of the popular vote in British Columbia history (61 percent) in the 1949 election. This victory was attributable to the popularity of his government's spending programs, despite rising criticism of corruption and abuse of power. During his tenure, major infrastructure continued to expand, such as the agreement with Alcan Aluminum to build the town of Kitimat with an aluminum smelter and the large Kemano Hydro Project. Johnson achieved popularity for flood relief efforts during the 1948 flooding of the Fraser Valley, which was a major blow to that region and to the province's economy.

On 13 February 1950, a Convair B-36B crashed in northern British Columbia after jettisoning a Mark IV atomic bomb. This was the first such nuclear weapon loss in history.

Increasing tension between the Liberal and Conservative coalition partners led the Liberal Party executive to vote to instruct Johnson to terminate the arrangement. Johnson ended the coalition and dropped his Conservative cabinet ministers, including deputy premier and finance minister Herbert Anscomb, precipitating the general election of 1952. A referendum on electoral reform prior to this election had instigated an elimination ballot (similar to a preferential ballot), where voters could select second and third choices. The intent of the ballot, as campaigned for by Liberals and Conservatives, was that their supporters would list the rival party in lieu of the CCF, but this plan backfired when a large group of voters from all major parties, including the CCF, voted for the Social Credit Party, who won the largest number of seats in the House (19), one seat ahead of the CCF, despite the CCF having 34.3 percent of the vote to Social Credit's 30.18 percent.

The Social Credit Party, led by rebel former Conservative MLA W. A. C. Bennett, formed a minority government backed by the Liberals and Conservatives (with 6 and 4 seats respectively). Bennett began a series of fiscal reforms, laying the groundwork for a second election in 1953 in which the new Bennett administration secured a majority of seats. Bennett then returned the province to the first-past-the-post system thereafter, which is still in use.

=== 1952–1960s ===
With the election of the Social Credit Party, British Columbia embarked on a phase of rapid economic development. Bennett and his party governed the province for the next twenty years, during which time the government initiated an ambitious program of infrastructure development. This was fuelled by a sustained economic boom in the forestry, mining, and energy sectors.

During these two decades, the government nationalized British Columbia Electric and the British Columbia Power Company, as well as smaller electric companies, renaming the entity BC Hydro. West Kootenay Power and Light remained independent of BC Hydro, being owned and operated by Cominco, though tied into the regional power grid. By the end of the 1960s, several major dams had been begun or were completed in—among other locations—the Peace, Columbia, and Nechako River watersheds. Major transmission deals were concluded, most notably the 1961 Columbia River Treaty between Canada and the United States, which required the building of three large dams in British Columbia in return for financial compensation related to US hydroelectric power production enabled by the dams. The dams flooded large areas within British Columbia but would prove to be a very stable and renewable source of power for the province. The province's economy was also boosted by unprecedented growth in the forestry sector, as well as oil and gas development in the province's northeast.

The 1950s and 1960s were also marked by development of the province's transportation infrastructure. In 1960, the government established BC Ferries as a crown corporation to provide a marine extension of the provincial highway system. The ferry system was also supported by federal grants as being part of the Trans-Canada Highway system. The highway system was improved and expanded through the construction of new highways and bridges, and paving of existing highways and provincial roads.

Vancouver and Victoria became cultural centres as poets, authors, artists, musicians, as well as dancers, actors, and haute cuisine chefs flocked to their scenery and warmer temperatures, with the cultural and entrepreneurial community bolstered by many Vietnam war draft dodgers from the United States. Tourism also played a role in the economy. The rise of the Japanese economy and other Pacific economies was a boost to British Columbia's economy, primarily because of exports of lumber products, minerals, and metallurgical coal.

Politically and socially, the 1960s brought a period of social volatility. The divide between the political left and right, which had prevailed in the province since the Depression and the rise of the labour movement, sharpened as free enterprise parties coalesced into the de facto coalition represented by Social Credit—in opposition to the social democratic New Democratic Party (NDP), the successor to the Co-operative Commonwealth Federation. As the province's economy blossomed, so did labour–management tensions. Tensions emerged, also, from the counterculture movement of the late 1960s, of which Vancouver and Nanaimo were centres. The conflict between hippies and Vancouver mayor Tom Campbell culminated in the Gastown riots of 1971.

=== 1970s and 1980s ===
On 27 August 1969, the Social Credit Party was re-elected in a general election for what would be Bennett's final term in power. At the start of the 1970s, the economy was strong because of rising coal prices and an increase in the size of the forestry sector; however, BC Hydro reported its first loss since founding. The Social Credit Party was forced from power in the August 1972 election, paving the way for a provincial NDP government under Dave Barrett. Under Barrett, the large provincial surplus soon became a deficit, although changes to the accounting system makes it likely some of the deficit was carried over from the previous Social Credit regime and its "two sets of books", as W. A. C. Bennett had once referred to his system of fiscal management. The brief three-year period of NDP governance brought several lasting changes to the province, most notably the creation of the Agricultural Land Reserve, intended to protect farmland from redevelopment, and the Insurance Corporation of British Columbia, a crown corporation charged with providing single-payer basic automobile insurance.

Perceptions the government had instituted reforms either too swiftly or that were too far-reaching, coupled with growing labour disruptions, led to the defeat of the NDP in the 1975 general election. Social Credit – under W. A. C. Bennett's son, Bill Bennett – was returned to office. Under the younger Bennett's government, 85 percent of the province's land base was transferred from government reserve to management by the Ministry of Forests, reporting of deputy ministers was centralized to the Premier's Office, and NDP-instigated social programs were rolled back.

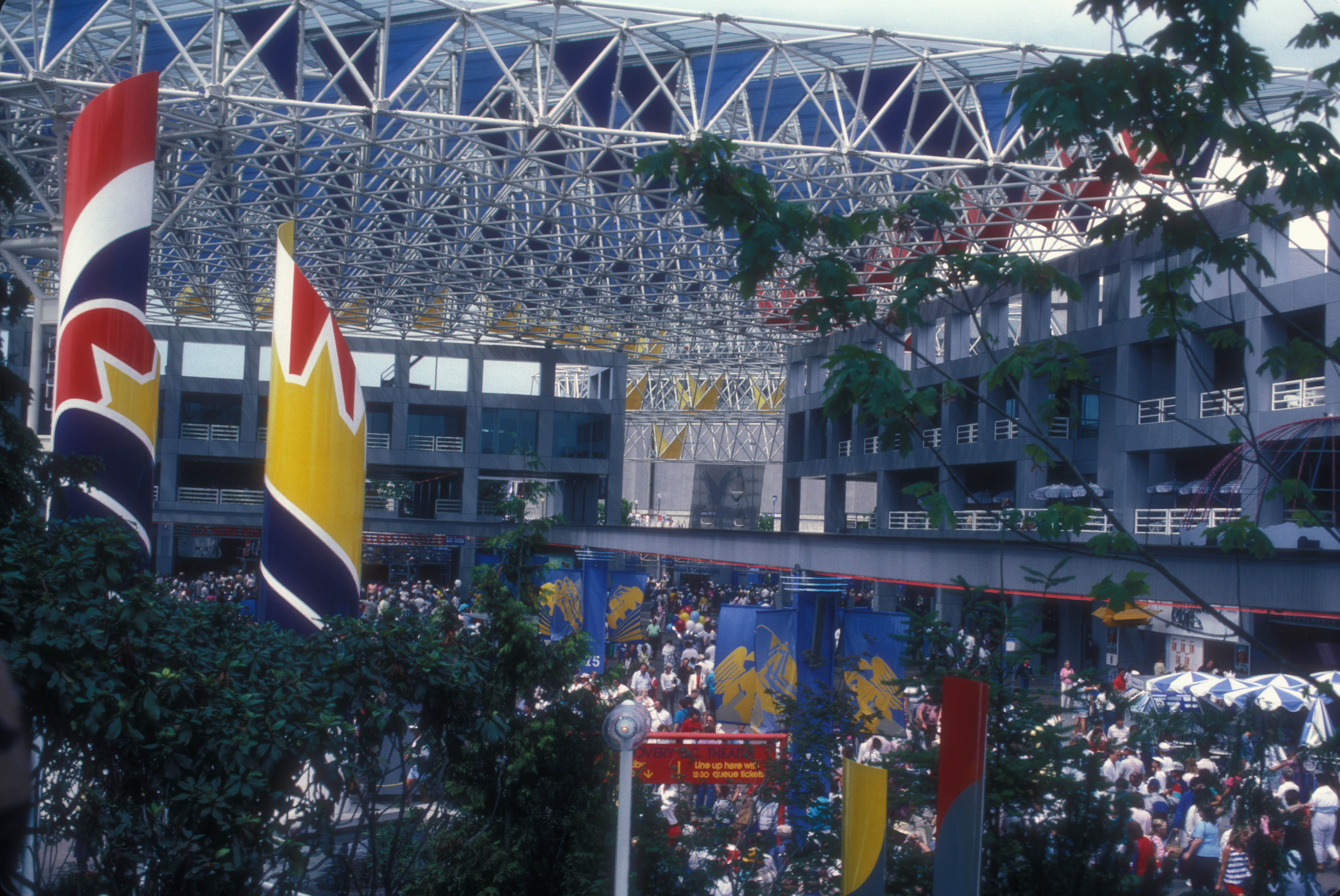
British Columbia's pavilion for Expo 86, Vancouver

During the 1975 Social Credit administration, certain money-losing Crown-owned assets were privatized in a selling of shares in the British Columbia Resources Investment Corporation, with the "Brick shares" soon becoming near-worthless. Towards the end of his tenure in power, Bennett oversaw the completion of several megaprojects meant to stimulate the economy. Most notable of these was the winning of a world's fair for Vancouver, which came in the form of Expo 86; to which was tied the construction of the Coquihalla Highway and Vancouver's SkyTrain system. The Coquihalla Highway project became the subject of a scandal after revelations that the premier's brother bought large tracts of land needed for the project before it was announced to the public. This was also because of graft investigations of the huge cost overruns on the project. Both investigations were derailed in the media by a still further scandal, the Doman Scandal, in which the premier and millionaire backer Herb Doman were investigated for insider-trading and securities fraud. The Social Credit Party was re-elected in 1979 under Bennett, who led the party until 1986.

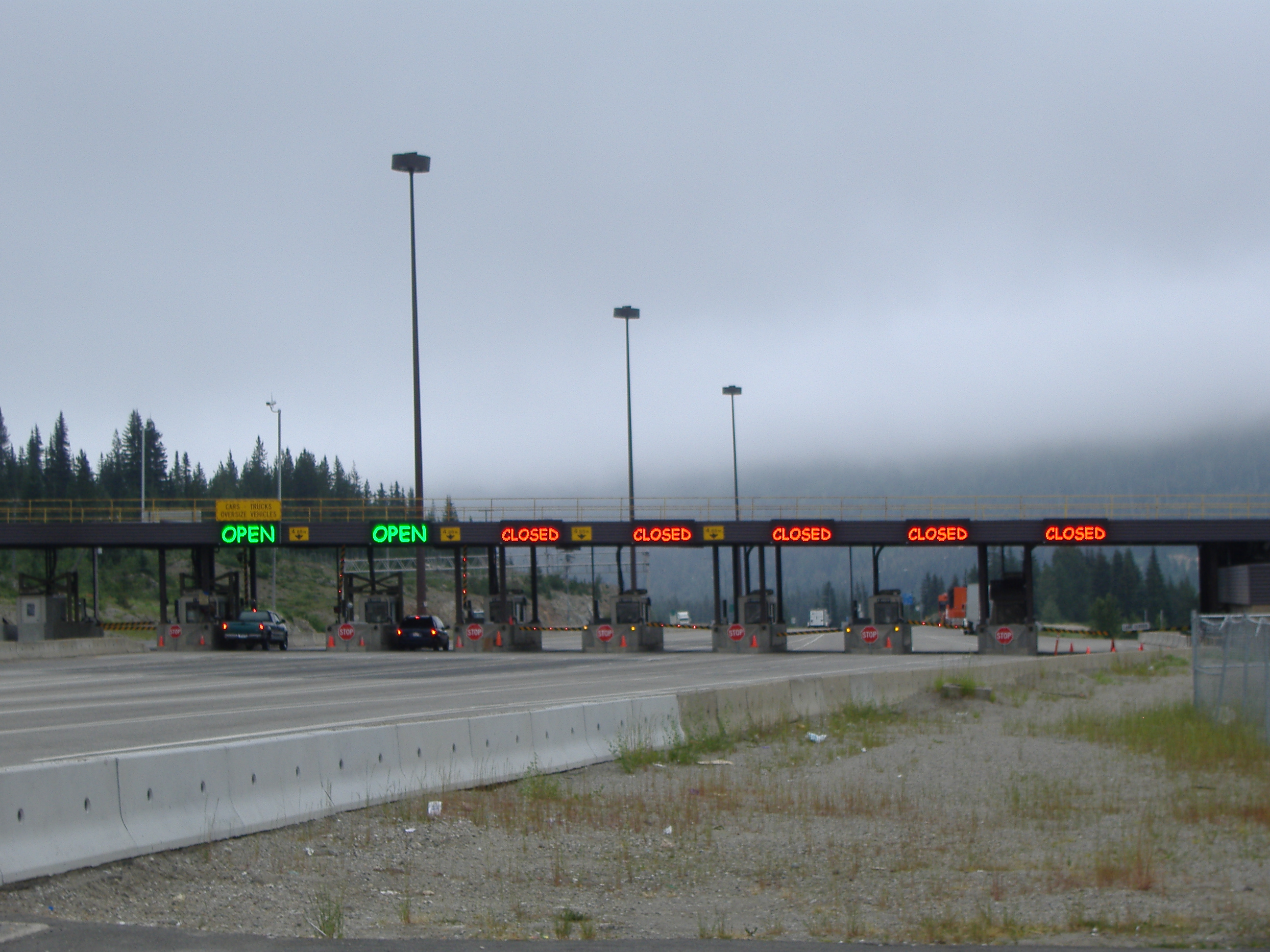
The Coquihalla Highway was one of the legacies of the Expo 86 world's fair, though creation of the toll highway sparked controversy. Tolling was removed in 2008.

As the province entered a sustained recession, Bennett's popularity and media image were in decline. On 1 April 1983, Premier Bennett overstayed his constitutional limits of power by exceeding the legal tenure of a government, and the lieutenant governor, Henry Pybus Bell-Irving, was forced to call Bennett to Government House to resolve the impasse. An election was called for 30 April 1983. In the meantime, government cheques were covered by special emergency warrants as the Executive Council no longer had signing authority because of the crisis. Campaigning on a platform of moderation, Bennett won a majority in the election.

After several weeks of silence in the aftermath, a sitting of the House was finally called. In the speech from the throne, the Social Credit Party announced a program of fiscal cutbacks. The program contained controversial budget cuts, which sparked public demonstrations which, through the course of a summer, drew large demonstrations of up to 100,000 people. This became known as the 1983 Solidarity Crisis. A grassroots opposition movement mobilized, consisting of organized labour and community groups, with the British Columbia Federation of Labour forming a separate organization of unions, Operation Solidarity. This was directed by Jack Munro, then-president of the International Woodworkers of America (IWA), the most powerful of the province's resource unions. The movement collapsed after an apparent deal was struck by Munro and Premier Bennett.

A tense winter of blockades at various job sites around the province ensued, as among the new laws were those enabling non-union labour to work on large projects. There were other sensitive labour issues, such as companies from Alberta and other provinces being allowed to compete with unionized British Columbia companies. Despite the tension, Bennett's last few years in power were relatively peaceful. Economic and political momentum grew because of the mega-projects associated with Expo 86, and Bennett was to end his career by hosting Prince Charles and Lady Diana on their visit to open Expo 86. After his retirement was announced, a Social Credit Party convention was scheduled at Whistler Resort, which would decide the leader of the party after his retirement.

Entrepreneur and former mayor of Surrey Bill Vander Zalm became the new Social Credit Party leader, and led the party to victory in the election later that year. A series of scandals forced Vander Zalm's resignation, and Rita Johnston became premier of the province. Johnston presided over the end of Social Credit power, calling an election which reduced the party's caucus to only two seats. This caused the revival of the long-defunct British Columbia Liberal Party as Opposition to the victorious NDP under former Vancouver mayor Mike Harcourt.

In 1988, David Lam was appointed as British Columbia's twenty-fifth lieutenant governor, and was the province's first lieutenant governor of Chinese origin.

=== 1990s ===
The New Democratic Party (NDP) won the 1991 general election. The NDP's creation of new parkland and protected areas was popular and helped boost the province's growing tourism sector, although the economy continued to struggle against the backdrop of a weak resource economy. Housing starts and an expanded service sector saw growth overall through the decade, despite political turmoil. The NDP won a second term in 1996. Scandals damaged the party, most notably the fast ferry scandal involving the province trying to develop the shipbuilding industry.

== 21st century ==
If the 20th century can be said to have been one of ethnocultural strife, the 21st thus far can be said to be one of relative harmony. One of the first pronouncements of Stephen Harper, upon his victory in the 39th general election to the Parliament in Ottawa, was that proper redress would be afforded the payers of the Chinese head tax. On 22 June 2006, he offered an apology and $20,000 compensation for the head tax once paid by Chinese immigrants. Asian people, at 20.2% of the total population, were in the 2006 census by far the largest visible minority demographic, with many of the Lower Mainland's large cities having sizable Chinese, South Asian, Japanese, Filipino, and Korean communities.

The BC Liberal Party won a landslide majority in the 2001 provincial election; the party would govern until the return of the NDP after the 2017 provincial election.

Whereas prior to 2009, the federal government was ill-disposed toward China, by the second quarter of 2009, the China Investment Corporation was able to purchase of a 17 percent share fraction of the Vancouver miner Teck Resources. The transition of views on the Chinese government has been unprecedented, from one of fear to one of official cooperation in the space of five years, and in the face of popular trepidation. In November 2013, British Columbia finance minister Mike de Jong reported a successful placement of Chinese RMB$2.5 billion in dim sum bonds.

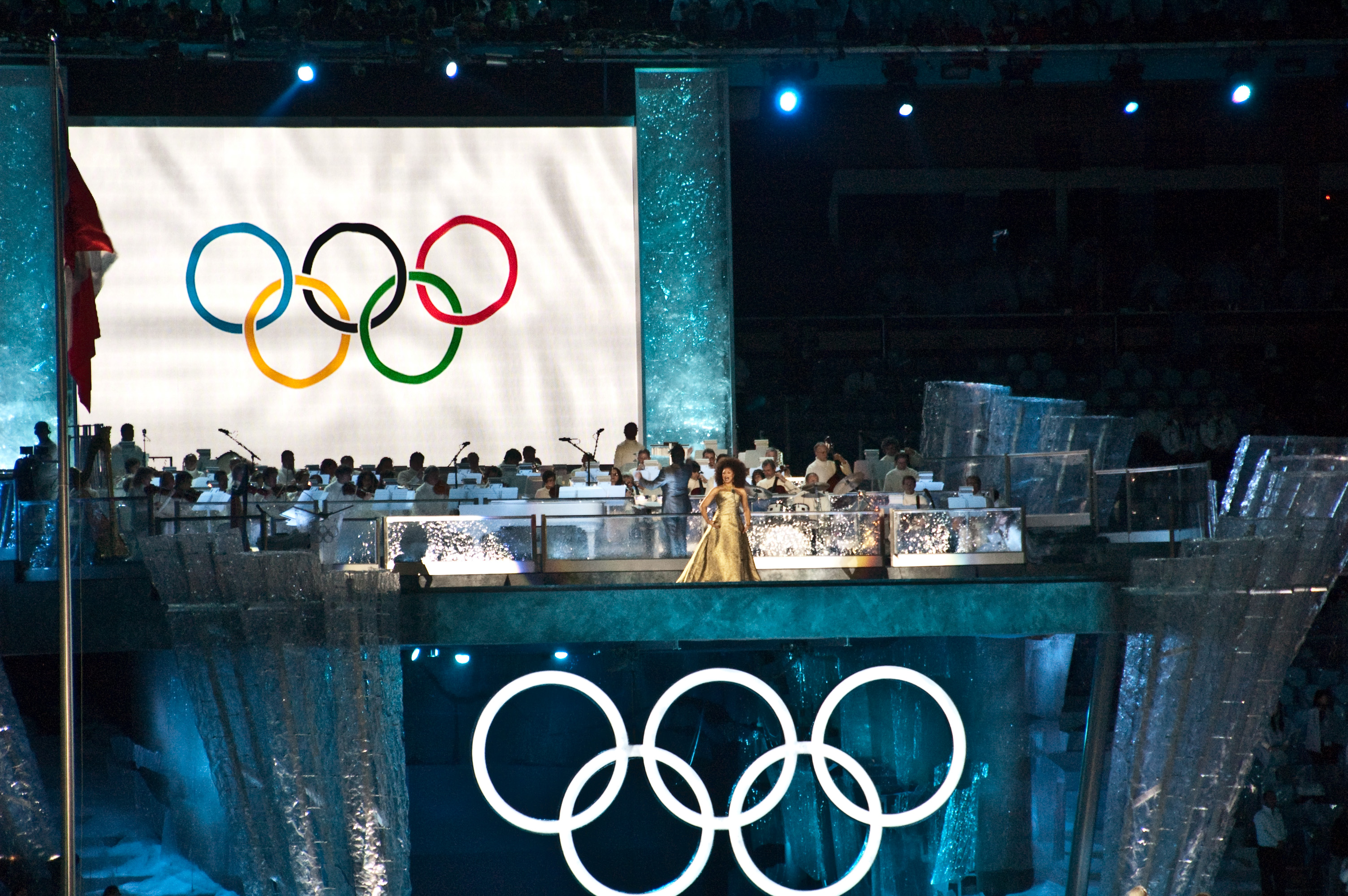
Measha Brueggergosman performing at the 2010 Winter Olympics in Vancouver

The province hosted the 2010 Winter Olympics in Vancouver and Whistler.

=== Crimes ===
- The scandal of the December 2003 BC Legislature Raids, which led to the October 2010 conviction of Dave Basi and Bob Virk, ministerial aides to Gary Collins and Janet Reid, respectively, involved "bribes – cash, meals, and NFL tickets – in exchange for leaking confidential [information] about the sale" of BC Rail. The case set precedent in R. v. Basi, according to which defendants' counsel may participate at pre-trial hearings involving a police informant.
- Although Robert Pickton had apparently claimed responsibility for 49 murders at or near his pig farm in Port Coquitlam, at trial by jury in 2007, he was only convicted of six.
- On 13 August 2007, an officer of the Vancouver Police Department fatally opened fire on Paul Boyd instead of deploying his taser, without legal consequence.
- On 14 October 2007, Robert Dziekański was tasered by a Royal Canadian Mounted Police officer. The incident might have been unreported but for the cell phone video taken by eyewitness Paul Pritchard. It took six years for the provincial coroner to determine that death of Dziekanski was a homicide.
- A drug dealer who failed to pay $100,000 to the Red Scorpion gang for trafficking on its turf was the catalyst for the execution of six people in a Surrey high rise in 2007.
- In 2026 on 10 February, a former student killed 8 people and wounded over two dozen others in the Tumbler Ridge shooting.

=== Civil amercement ===
After a scandal-filled second term for the BC NDP government, the BC Liberals won the 2001 election with the biggest landslide in BC history: 77 of 79 seats. Gordon Campbell became the seventh premier in ten years, and the first Liberal premier in almost 50 years. On 25 November 2005, the Civil Forfeiture Act (CFA) was passed by Campbell's second government with a 3:2 majority. This act followed Ontario's Civil Remedies Act, which had passed in November 2003. This act makes it possible for the government to amerce or to seize property without due process, and the Civil Forfeiture Office (CFO) has been eager to use this power in order to fill the coffers of government. The office does not need criminal charges, or convictions, to amerce a property. Bill 5 was introduced by Solicitor-General Rich Coleman, who made liberal use of the "organized crime" fear, uncertainty, and doubt tactic. He also mentioned that Ontario, Manitoba, and Alberta had also recently introduced similar legislation.

The act, which was brought in with "organized crime" as the target, since at least 2007 has been expanded to target ordinary citizens. In latter-day practice, amercements may include partial (Jang) or full seizure (Lloydsmith, Rai) of a house. On 4 May 2011, Solicitor-General Shirley Bond of Christy Clark's first government introduced the concept of "administrative forfeiture", under which a civil court is no longer required to judge amercements of property worth less than $75,000. The CFO moved in mid-2012 to seize the guide certificate of Robert Milligan, a certain way to destroy his livelihood. The CFO has a budgetary target. Offences under the Motor Vehicle Act, Wildlife Act, and Employment Standards Act are now pursued by the CFO. Justice Minister Suzanne Anton expressed unreserved support for the CFO and CFA in a January 2014 interview.

== First Nations ==
The legacy of British Imperialism in BC is unusual in that neither conquest nor treaties were undertaken as settlement occurred under the doctrine of Terra nullius. With few exceptions (the Douglas Treaties of Fort Rupert and southern Vancouver Island), no treaties were signed. Some early settlers assumed, based on the catastrophic population crash of First Nations peoples linked to smallpox and racist ideas, that "Indians" were a dying race, which led to a lack of action to deal with what was then termed the "Indian land question".

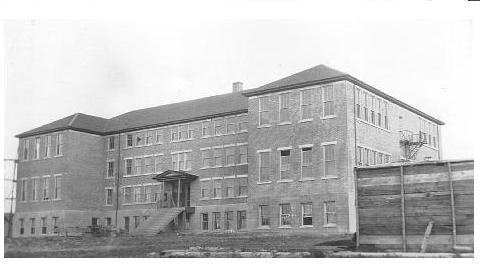
Lejac residential school at Fraser Lake during the 1920s. It was one of several institutions in BC that was part of the Canadian Indian residential school system.

Upon Confederation, the federal government assumed responsibility for Indians and lands reserved for Indians, while the province had responsibility for non-Aboriginal civil matters and resources. The 1913 McKenna-McBride Royal Commission made some amendments to lands but failed to deal with issues pertaining to title and First Nations rights. Several delegations to Ottawa and London were sent by First Nations seeking redress for grievances, to little avail. Instead, the Indian Act, federal legislation governing First Nations, was amended to make it a crime to organize or engage legal counsel. Other oppressive measures also accompanied the amendment including the Potlatch Ban and the increasingly applied Indian Residential School system designed to assimilate First Nations.

The status of the First Nations (Aboriginal) people of British Columbia is a long-standing problem that has become a major issue in recent years. First Nations were confined to tiny reserves that no longer provide an economic base. They were provided with inadequate education and discriminated against in numerous ways. In many areas, they were excluded from restaurants and other establishments. Status Indians gained the right to vote in 1960. They were prohibited from possessing alcohol, which rather than preventing problems with this drug, exacerbated them by fostering unhealthy patterns of consumption such as binge drinking. Certain privileges of status Indians are governed by the Indian Act. With the exception of what are known as the Douglas Treaties, negotiated by James Douglas with the native people of the Victoria area, no treaties were signed in British Columbia until 1998. Many native people wished to negotiate treaties, but the province refused until 1990. Another major development was the 1997 decision of the Supreme Court of Canada in the Delgamuukw v. British Columbia case that aboriginal title still exists in British Columbia.

60% of First Nations in British Columbia are aligned with the First Nations Summit. This brings a total of 58 First Nations, but only 20 are said to be inactive negotiations. Three Final Agreements have been settled, with one being rejected by Lheidli T'enneh in 2007. The other two, the Maa-nulth treaty group, a 5 Nuu-chah-nulth member group, and the Tsawwassen First Nation. Although these treaties have yet to be ratified by Parliament in Ottawa and Legislature in Victoria, neighbouring First Nations are seeking to block these treaties in the courts. A group of Vancouver Island and some mainland First Nations, the WSANEC, Lekwungen, and Semiahmoo, are seeking to block to Tsawwassen First Nation treaty, claiming infringement on their rights and land titles. On the west coast of Vancouver Island, the Ditidaht First Nation is doing the same against the Maa-nulth treaty group. The only treaty signed in recent years, the Nisga'a Treaty (1998), was negotiated outside of the current treaty process. There is considerable disagreement about treaty negotiations. Among indigenous people, there is mounting criticism of extinguishment of Aboriginal title and continued assimilation strategies by attempting to change the indigenous peoples from nations to municipal style government. Therefore, a substantial number of First Nations governments consider the current treaty process inadequate and have refused to participate.

A November 2007 court ruling for the Xeni Gwet'in First Nation called future participation in the process into question. The judge ruled that the Xeni Gwet'in could demonstrate aboriginal title to half of the Nemaia Valley, and that the province had no power over these lands. Under the BC treaty process, negotiating nations have received as little as 5% of their claimed land recognized. Grand Chief Stewart Phillip, president of the Union of BC Indian Chiefs, called the court victory a "nail in the coffin" of the BC treaty process.

In May 2021, unmarked graves containing the remains of 215 children were found at a former Kamloops Indian residential school, part of the Canadian Indian residential school system.

== See also ==
- Outline of British Columbia
- Aboriginal peoples in Canada
- Former colonies and territories in Canada
- History of the west coast of North America

== Bibliography ==
- Barman, Jean (1991). The West Beyond the West: A History of British Columbia. Toronto: University of Toronto Press. ISBN 9780802027399.
- Howay, F. W.; Sage, W. N.; Angus, H. F. (1942). British Columbia and the United States: The North Pacific Slope from Fur Trade to Aviation. Toronto: The Ryerson Press.
- Scott, Laura Elaine (1983). The Imposition of British Culture as Portrayed in the New Westminster Capital Plan of 1859 to 1862. Simon Fraser University.
