= William Kashtan =

Canadian communist leader (1909–1992)

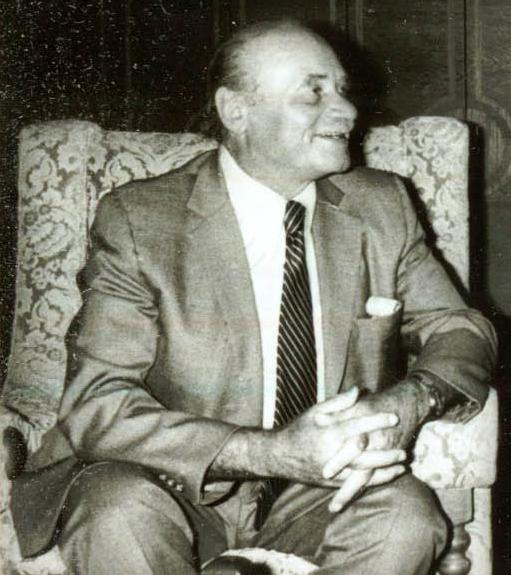

General Secretary of the Communist Party of Canada
- In office 1965–1988
- Preceded by: Leslie Morris
- Succeeded by: George Hewison

Personal details
- Born: June 27, 1909 Montreal, Québec
- Died: June 17, 1992 (aged 82) Toronto, Ontario
- Resting place: Bathurst Lawn Memorial Park
- Party: Communist Party of Canada
- Other political affiliations: Labor-Progressive Party (1943–1959)

William Kashtan (27 June 1909 – 17 June 1992) was the general secretary of the Communist Party of Canada for 23 years beginning in January 1965, several months following the death of Leslie Morris, until his retirement in 1988. The delay in his assuming of the position was due to the opposition of Tim Buck to his appointment.

== Life and career ==
Kashtan was born in Montreal, Quebec in 1909. In 1927, at the age of 18, he joined the Young Communist League. Two years later, he moved to southern Ontario to organize for the YCL there and then became the League's general secretary in 1930. In 1936, he helped found the Canadian Youth Congress which, at its peak, had over 400,000 members.

He visited Spain early in the Spanish Civil War and on his return helped organize the Mackenzie–Papineau Battalion.

After World War II he served as Toronto organizer of the Labor-Progressive Party, as the Communist Party was known from 1943 to 1959, and served subsequently as industrial director, labour secretary and central organizer.

He was a perennial candidate for the Labor-Progressive Party and then the Communist Party of Canada and became general secretary of the party in 1965, despite the opposition of party chairman and longtime leader Tim Buck.

Kashtan never succeeded in winning election to the House of Commons of Canada, and retired in 1988. He was an orthodox, pro-Moscow Communist and consistently supported the Soviet Union through various shifts in policy at the Kremlin. Kashtan opposed Eurocommunism in the 1970s when many other Communist Parties in the West embraced it.

In 1970, Kashtan spoke out against the Front de libération du Québec (FLQ) group in Quebec, describing it as a terrorist organization and claiming that its methods were not consistent with genuine revolutionary behaviour.

In 1971, on behalf of the CPC, he suggested James Gareth Endicott resign as president of the Canadian Peace Congress because he had drawn anti-Soviet and pro-China views, to which Endicott consented.

Kashtan retired as party leader in 1988 and was replaced by George Hewison. In the early 1990s, following the dissolution of the Soviet Union, Hewison and his supporters attempted to move the Communist Party away from Marxism-Leninism and towards social democracy in light of the failure of Soviet-style Communism. Kashtan came out of retirement to fight the changes, along with future Party leader and then member of the Central Executive, Elizabeth Rowley.

His views on the Soviet-Afghan war can be summarized in his 1980 speech at the University of Alberta:

The Soviet Union's involvement in Afghanistan was not an act of aggression or intervention ... Rather, the Soviet Union was honoring a 1978 treaty with Afghanistan, which stipulated that Afghanistan could ask the U.S.S.R. for military aid ... He cited resistance to the revolution by the land-owning and capitalist classes as an internal factor. And continuing interference in the affairs of Afghanistan by Cpina [recte China], Pakistan, as well as the CIA, is an external reason mentioned by Kashtan.

== Electoral record ==
1984 Canadian federal election: Trinity
Party	Candidate	Votes	%	±%
Liberal	Aideen Nicholson	9,811	43.59	-13.93
New Democratic	David English	6,712	29.82	+7.02
Progressive Conservative	Peter Rekai	5,120	22.75	+5.92
Green	Susan Berlin	341	1.52	–
Libertarian	Peter W. Ring	255	1.13	-0.75
Communist	William Kashtan	195	0.87	+0.15
Commonwealth of Canada	Ted Ma	73		–
Total valid votes		22,507		

1980 Canadian federal election: Trinity
Party	Candidate	Votes	%	±%
Liberal	Aideen Nicholson	12,628	57.52	+9.59
New Democratic	Manuel Azevedo	5,005	22.80	-3.05
Progressive Conservative	Richard Boraks	3,695	16.83	-5.92
Libertarian	Vijay Basdeo	412	1.88	-0.38
Communist	William Kashtan	159	0.72	-0.18
Marxist–Leninist	Aili Waldman	57	0.26	-0.05
Total valid votes		21,956		

1979 Canadian federal election: Trinity
Party	Candidate	Votes	%	±%
Liberal	Aideen Nicholson	10,206	47.93	-4.84
New Democratic	Manuel Azevedo	5,504	25.85	+12.82
Progressive Conservative	Frank Lacka	4,843	22.75	-9.54
Libertarian	Maureen Cain	482	2.26	–
Communist	William Kashtan	192	0.90	-0.26
Marxist–Leninist	Aili Waldman	65	0.31	-0.13
Total valid votes		21,292		

1974 Canadian federal election: Trinity
Party	Candidate	Votes	%	±%
Liberal	Aideen Nicholson	10,683	52.77	+13.16
Progressive Conservative	Paul Hellyer	6,537	32.29	-8.19
New Democratic	Jonathan Cohen	2,637	13.03	-4.67
Communist	William Kashtan	234	1.16	–
Marxist–Leninist	Jim Turnbull	90	0.44	–
Independent	Martin K. Weiche	64	0.32	–
Total valid votes		20,245		

1972 Canadian federal election: Davenport, Toronto
Party	Candidate	Votes	%	±%
Liberal	Charles Caccia	9,366	43.7	-6.7
Progressive Conservative	John A. Gillespie	6,442	30.1	+8.0
New Democratic	Angelo Principe	5,272	24.6	-2.9
Independent	William Kashtan	190	0.9	
Independent	Richard Daly	160	0.7	
Total valid votes		21,430	100.0	

1968 Canadian federal election: York West
Party	Candidate	Votes	%	±%
Liberal	Philip Givens	20,416	44.8	-2.9
New Democratic	Val Scott	16,204	35.6	+12.7
Progressive Conservative	Wes Boddington	8,344	18.3	-11.2
Independent	Norman Gunn	442	1.0	
Communist	William Kashtan	155	0.3	
Total valid votes		45,561	100.0	

1965 Canadian federal election: Davenport, Toronto
Party	Candidate	Votes	%	±%
Liberal	Walter L. Gordon	9,887	58.4	+3.6
Progressive Conservative	Daniel Iannuzzi	3,907	23.1	+0.6
New Democratic	Nelson W. Abraham	2,918	17.2	-4.4
Communist	William Kashtan	224	1.3	
Total valid votes		16,936	100.0	

Canadian federal by-election, November 8, 1954: Trinity Death of Lionel Conacher
Party	Candidate	Votes	%	±%
Liberal	Donald Carrick	5,589	38.60	-2.34
Progressive Conservative	Willson Woodside	4,237	29.26	-1.33
Co-operative Commonwealth	Herman A. Voaden	3,700	25.55	+5.85
Labor–Progressive	William Kashtan	953	6.58	-2.19
Total valid votes		14,479		

1953 Canadian federal election: Broadview
Party	Candidate	Votes	%	±%
Progressive Conservative	George Hees	10,403	49.58	+1.47
Liberal	Joseph J. Carroll	6,316	30.10	+2.08
Co-operative Commonwealth	Herbert Gargrave	3,910	18.63	-4.39
Labor–Progressive	William Kashtan	224	1.07	–
Socialist Labor	Alan Sanderson	130	0.62	-0.23
Total valid votes		20,983		

1945 Canadian federal election: St. Paul's
Party	Candidate	Votes	%	±%
Progressive Conservative	Douglas Ross	12,390	40.7	-10.6
Liberal	James Rooney	12,211	40.1	-8.6
Co-operative Commonwealth	Andrew F. Brewin	4,958	16.3	
Labor–Progressive	William Kashtan	895	2.9	
Total valid votes		30,454	100.0	
