= Stanley Bréhaut Ryerson =

Canadian historian (1911–1998)

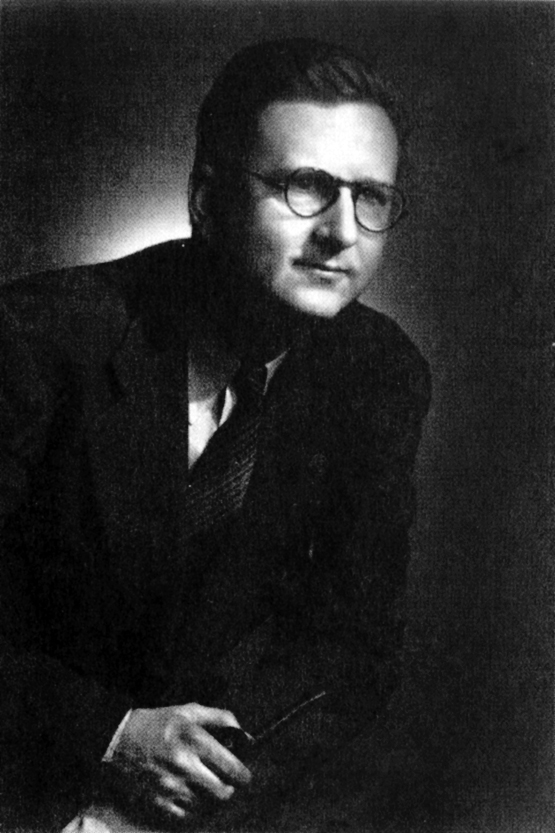
- Stanley B. Ryerson in 1944
- Born: March 12, 1911; Toronto, Canada
- Died: April 25, 1998 (aged 87); Montreal, Canada
- Education: Upper Canada College, University of Toronto, Sorbonne
- Political party: Communist Party of Canada (1934−1971)
- Spouse(s): Simonne Levy (m. 1934, div.); Mildred Helfand Ryerson (m. 1944)
- Children: 2

Stanley Bréhaut Egerton Ryerson (March 12, 1911 – 25 April 1998) was a Canadian historian, educator, political activist. His parents were Edward Stanley Ryerson and Tessie De Vigne, a well-off middle-class family in Toronto. Ryerson's paternal grandfather was Egerton Ryerson, a leading Methodist and educator in nineteenth century Toronto. His grandmother, Emily Eliza Beatty, was a sister-in-law to William McDougall, one of the Fathers of Confederation; and, on his mother's side, he was related to Louis Antoine Bréhaut de l'Isle, French Commander at Trois-Rivières in 1638.

== Ideological origins ==
Ryerson began his communist activism while attending classes towards a Diplomes d'Etudes Superieures with a thesis on the writings of Sicilian peasant-realist novelist Giovanni Verga, which he started at the Sorbonne in Paris in 1931. While travelling through Europe, he experienced the political turmoil in Spain and Italy during the early depression years, and while in Paris he took part in the funeral procession of the last survivor of the Paris Commune of 1871, a Z. Camelinat. On this day in 1932, while marching with 200,000 others to Père Lachaise Cemetery, Ryerson felt a fierce wave of connection with the French Left. His experiences in Europe affected his vision of the capitalist world and he would write: "the realization that the cultural values of art and literature were being turned by capitalism into what I can only describe as spiritual onanism and the discovery that communism, by solving the material problems of society, was the only path to a future creative renaissance, was the first impulse."

Europe was the scene of his birth as a communist; Canada was the scene of his growth into a historian and communist intellectual.

== In the Communist Party ==
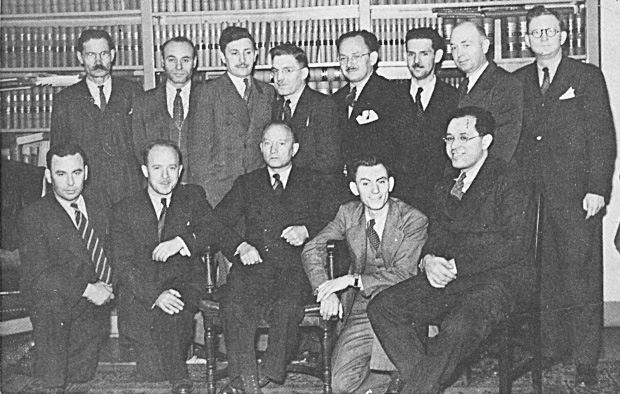
Stanley B. Ryerson (top right) with other Canadian Communist leaders in 1942.

In the 1930s and 1940s, the Communist Party of Canada lacked a connection to the Canadian middle class as well as intellectuals; with his return to Canada, Ryerson would become a symbol of the party's appeal to this segment of society. Ryerson "was not the only traditional intellectual to join the CPC, but he was one of the first and undoubtedly was to become the most important." The Communist parties of Great Britain and the United States of America, as well as many other nations, could count numerous artists and intellectuals as members from the 1930s on; but in Canada, Ryerson was a lonely figure. His position within the CPC, including his rapid rise in the party hierarchy and his presence on the Central Committee (CC) until 1969, was assured by his unique position; a position that allowed him to play a role within the "political history of Canadian Communism unlike that of his American and British counterparts." He was a middle class school boy from a privileged background in an overwhelmingly proletarian organisation, and as such his presence within the CPC did not always meet with approval. His education, however, made him an asset for the party that would become more valuable in the years to come.

== Marxist historian ==
Ryerson's major contribution was as a Marxist historian and it was here that Ryerson was to find his voice. The Canadian bourgeoisie's dismissal of Communism generally states that it is an alien importation and as such has no basis within Canadian society. By stressing the progressive nature of the Canadian past, the CPC hoped to prove the validity of its existence within Canadian society. During this period, the CPC published numerous articles and pamphlets, but Stanley Ryerson's 1837: The Birth of Canadian Democracy, published in 1937, was the first full Marxist analysis on the 1837 Rebellions. 1837 should be viewed as a work of Marxist historiography written for a working-class audience and not for academia; since Ryerson wrote this book so it could be used as a weapon in the struggle of working people to build a qualitatively different and better world. Ryerson's rationale for writing this book, as was the rationale for all his works, can be best summarised as an exploration of Canadian history with the hopes of educating the working class; in a sense it was an exercise in the raising of class consciousness.

The choice of the title for this book is in itself an interesting by-product of the 1930s Popular Front activities of the CPC. Dedicated to the soldiers of the Mackenzie-Papineau Battalion fighting in the Spanish Civil War in defence of Republican Spain, this book was written in the hope of redefining the context of revolution. Ryerson referred to the cause of 1837 as the cause of democracy; his decision to place the word in the title of his book, was done with the hope of suggesting that this referred "to both bourgeois liberalism that will supplant the remnants of feudal oligarchy and the ultimate vision of equality in the classless society brought about by the proletarian revolution." Doyle contended it was Ryerson's aim to redefine "democracy," and the way in which we refer to the events of 1837 and the idea of revolution in general.

== In leadership ==
Following the outlawing of the CPC in 1940, General Secretary Tim Buck along with Sam Carr and Charles Sims fled Canada for the safety of New York where they would reside under the protection of the Communist Party of the United States of America (CPUSA). The leadership of the now underground party was placed in the hands of an Operations Centre, which was headed by Stewart Smith, Leslie Morris, and Stanley Ryerson. This new leadership decided upon a slogan for the CPC's anti-war protests: "Withdraw from the British Empire". Signalling a more radical approach to their anti-imperialist protests, the Operations Centre authorised Ryerson to write and publish two pamphlets in Quebec, French-Canada, A Nation in Bondage and French-Canada and the War. The pamphlets described French Canada as a subjugated people held in "slavery" by English Canada. This new approach to the issue of French Canada enabled Ryerson to develop close contacts among Canadian nationalists who opposed the war. With the German invasion of the Soviet Union in July, 1941 the CPC's stance on the war changed quickly. Now that they supported the war, Tim Buck called Ryerson, Smith, and Morris before a CC meeting held on January 22 and 23, 1943. During this meeting, Buck assailed the position of Ryerson, which had become the position of the CPC during their anti-war period. According to Buck, "English-Canada as a nation does not oppress French-Canada, nor impose inequality upon it. The national inequality from which the workers and farmers of Quebec suffer, is a heritage of the past."

== Attitude towards French Canada ==
Later that year, the Communist Party, re-constituted as the Labor-Progressive Party, published Ryerson's French Canada: A Study in Canadian Democracy. Within the pages of French Canada, Ryerson set out his vision of their vision for the future of Canada. He also emphasised the common aims of French and English Canadians in their anti-capitalist and anti-colonialist goals. Although researched and mostly written while Ryerson was occupied with the direction of the underground party, French Canada was a careful and provocative analysis of Quebec's social and political history.

French Canada aimed to encourage the development of a sense of national pride and unity among Canadians during the Second World War era. Ryerson put forth a socio-economic analysis of Quebec and in turn educated most English-speaking Canadians about a region they knew very little about. As a sequel to 1837, Ryerson's French Canada revealed "the militant spirit of democracy among French Canadians" in the hopes of uniting "them with their Anglophone compatriots." Ryerson did follow a certain "great man" approach to history when, in the early chapters, he emphasized the heroes "who struggled for self-determination and/or Canadian unity"; this approach was complemented by an emphasis on "the Quebec masses and their rise out of feudal subjugation toward political power." Following historical materialism too, Ryerson viewed the previous administrations of Quebec as working with representatives of English Canada and international capitalism to keep Quebec in economic subservience. Ryerson believed, "The Toronto Tory and the Quebec corporatist meet on common ground: hostility to the democratic peoples' movement, [and] denial of our democratic heritage." Following on his contentions laid out in 1837, Ryerson viewed the failure of English Canada to recognise their connection to French Canada and to fight hand in hand for the fullest democratic rights of the minority nation only served to deepen the power of reactionary influences and limit Canadian democracy and unity in general.

French Canada was a by-product of World War II and should be viewed as such. It was full of optimism about the prospects of an Allied victory in the war against international fascism and a transformed world capable of bringing about the complete elimination of the conditions that gave rise to fascism and to the prospect of war. Although this book is full of optimism about a possible future world, Ryerson did not envision a Communist future for Canada and instead placed the LPP as an important part of post-war Canada, but not a defining movement or a dominant party. Ryerson's vision did not come to pass, but his analysis of the political perspicacity of working-class Quebec was groundbreaking as it came during a time when most writers tended to view "Quebec as either a quaint or lamentable anachronism." French Canada gave its readers a more modern and hopeful image of French-Canadian society.

== Intellectual evolution ==
For Ryerson, an understanding of social relations was paramount if one was to garner an understanding of history; his encounter with Harold Innis's materialism led Ryerson to the charge that equated Marxism and economic determinism. He wrote "Marxism holds that it is the people who make history-their labor and their struggles and their dreams; and that these are understandable and have meaning when seen in their real setting…" He added, "Labor, production, the real relationships of living society: this is the point of departure for historical materialism…Thought and feelings, ideas and passion and imagination have their being in a material world, are conditioned by it, work upon it." Ryerson's approach to history is that of a man who sees the struggles and ideas of people as the driving force behind history. He did not believe they operate within a vacuum but within a given social system. Ryerson recognised the interplay of freedom and necessity within the development of history "as it is in the best Marxist historical writing."

Following on the tradition of viewing his writings as a mode of class consciousness, The Founding of Canada was written very much as a popular Marxist introduction to Canadian history. This book offered very little new material and was instead more of a shifting in emphasis for Ryerson. This shift in emphasis stemmed primarily from Ryerson's interest in prehistory and Soviet anthropology; this shift in emphasis is best illustrated by the six chapters on pre-European-contact Canada. This work was not a complete shift of emphasis; Ryerson still dealt with the issue of exploitation and freedom. He believed "[t]he weight of 'official' historiography has hitherto been heavily on the side of efforts to smother the facts of exploitation," and because of this "[t]he idyllic patriarchal picture of these times that has become traditional, is a piece of flagrant deception."

Retrospectives of Ryerson have treated Unequal Union as the more adventuresome of these two works. It focused on only 60 years, rather than the 300-year scope of The Founding of Canada, and it discussed more deeply the events after the War of 1812 leading up to the expansion of Canadian confederation in 1870. In this work, Ryerson turned to an analysis of land and land-holding, recognising the importance of land to the upper class during the colonial era. Gregory Kealey felt Ryerson overextended himself in his argument that the land-monopoly represented a "sort of commercialised feudalism" which "loomed as the dominating problem before the Canadas." But Ryerson's analysis of the 1837 Rebellions held true for Kealey, as he agrees with the classical Marxist formulation that "potential production forces were stifled by dominant property relations; and as long as the latter couldn't be broken down progress remained illusory." Therefore, the rebellions of 1837 were an effort to break the "rule of a landlord-merchant oligarchy," blocking the development of industrial capitalism.

== Analysis of nation and class ==
Ryerson showed how the concepts of "nation" and "class", as used by Marxist historians, can aid in an understanding of Canadian problems. He did not attempt to place Canadian history into a preconceived framework of ideas. Instead, he sought to bring the role of 'class' and 'nation', and persons and personalities, into the forefront of discussion instead of allowing them "to disappear behind a cloud of economic factors." For Ryerson, the complexities and contradictions of Canadian history can be best analysed through the lens of class conflict rather than idealistic theses of most bourgeois historians. Throughout these two volumes, Ryerson emphasised his critical view of colonialism and its effect on Canadian society. This two-volume work, Ryerson explained modestly, was intended as "a preliminary breaking of ground, suggesting a line of approach to a re-interpretation of this country's history". These volumes are more scholarly in style and documentation, as they were "addressed less to a working-class readership and more to academic historians and other well-informed readers."

Freedom was of paramount concern for Ryerson, whether it is the freedom of French Canadians or the freedom of the working class in general, Ryerson consistently built his arguments on the notion of freedom. In his philosophical work, The Open Society: Paradox and Challenge, published in 1965 outside of the CPC's press, Ryerson discussed his vision of an open and free society. The crux of his argument is found in the issue of freedom; he saw the past as "an evolution of people in society, marked by harsh conflict of contending classes and national forces, generating a progression toward greater freedom." The driving force behind all of society is the nature of class existence and each struggle the oppressed class wages brings it closer to freedom. According to many Marxist thinkers, including Ryerson, the ability to break through to a more open society will come about from the "dispelling of the fog of false consciousness, [the] gaining for ourselves a true recognition of the real nature of the existing social structure."

== Academic career ==
Ryerson paid a price for his commitment to the CPC and his analysis of Canadian history. Upon his return to Canada from his studies in Europe, he took up party work in August 1934 in Montreal, where he taught French studies at Sir George Williams University. Ryerson had been working very closely with the CPC and in 1935 he was elected to the Central Committee (CC) and was elected provincial secretary in 1936. He held his position at the College for three years until his secret was discovered; he worked and wrote under the pseudonym of E. Roger to protect his job, his politics would lead to his eventual non-renewal in 1937. Ryerson's next academic position would not come for 35 years, a year after he parted company with the CPC; he would accept a position in the History department at the Université du Québec à Montréal, and "at age 58, he commenced the academic career he had sacrificed in the 1930s."

== Breaking with the Party ==
His decision to leave the CPC in 1971 was primarily based upon his experiences within the Party from 1956 (the year of the Hungarian Revolution) up to, and after, the Soviet invasion of Prague in 1968. During his 35-year tenure in the CPC, Ryerson was routinely asked to augment his historical writings to meet the prevailing philosophy at the time. After the internal party crisis between 1956 and 1957, Ryerson was forced to write an article stating his previous books and articles had given "a rather idealised treatment of the bourgeois democrats Lafontaine and Baldwin." Blaming this on "liberalism," he essentially turned his back on his earlier beliefs concerning 1837 and sought to align himself with the new revisionist tendencies within the CPC that came about during the post-Stalin debate. Ryerson's beliefs concerning Marxism-Leninism differed greatly from that of the CPC of the late 1950s and early 1960s. His vision was brought to the forefront when in his article "In France: 'The Week of Marxist Thought'," he agreed with the leader of the French Communist party who argued:

that among the shoals to avoid, …, is the narrow, 'cramped conception of Marxism-Leninism simply as a position to be defended, a fortress to be held, with every portcullis closed while one peers out over the battlements at all who are not 'our people' wandering on the distant plain'

This sentiment did resonate with the leadership of General Secretary Leslie Morris, who viewed the sentiments of the Popular Front much more favourably than was seen under the leadership of William Kashtan; it was under Kashtan's leadership that Ryerson made his final break with the CPC.

== Views on Ryerson ==
Common criticism of Ryerson accuses his work of continual failure to transcend the CPC's ideological passivity when it came to their relationship with Moscow. Kealey sees these arguments as being based upon a belief that Ryerson's understanding of Marxism was severely limited by the many Stalinist distortions people generally see in Soviet philosophy disseminated during Ryerson's time in the CPC. It is true that party work affected his intellectual work; his choice of material was in many respects dictated by the political atmosphere of the day. But this does not mean he substituted party beliefs for his own in every respect. Ryerson was a dedicated Communist, who saw within the CPC the best vehicle for advancing the cause of Communism and the betterment of the working class. His decision to follow the general line, and in some instances deny his true beliefs, is unfortunate but should not be viewed from outside of their historical realities. During the era of the Popular Front, Ryerson wrote in a manner befitting that era and during the time of the Democratic Front he stridently put forth arguments seeking the destruction of Fascism as it was, in his eyes, the best way forward for the working-class. The removal of Ryerson from his intellectual and historical "context denies him recognition as the major pioneer of Marxist historical writing in Canada;" and it also denies the very nature of Ryerson and his role in Canadian society.

As a Party intellectual, he was in the minority when compared to other communist parties in the world; but his dedication to a Marxist analysis of history and Canadian society was unsurpassed within the CPC. His early education was founded on the study of literature, but his time in Paris in the early 1930s would forever change his life and transform him into an Organic Intellectual of the working-class. His rationale for delving into historical and political writing can be found within the pages of Open Society. In reading 1837, French Canada, The Founding of Canada, and Unequal Union, readers find Ryerson's journey to "dispel the fog of false consciousness". At the very heart of his writings are the class struggle and the raising of class consciousness through the written word.
