= James Gareth Endicott =

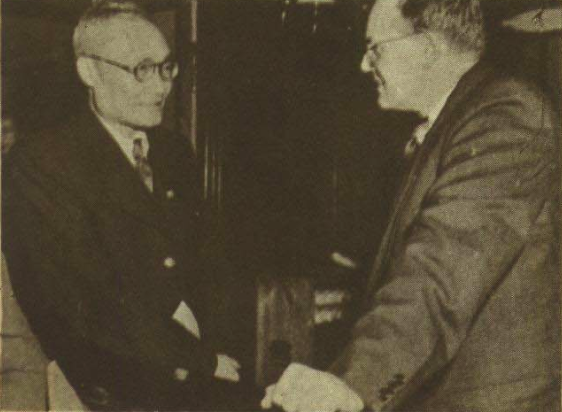
- James Gareth Endicott (right) with Y. T. Wu

President of the International Institute for Peace
- In office 1957–1971

President of the Canadian Peace Congress
- In office 1949–1971
- Preceded by: Office established
- Succeeded by: John Hanly Morgan

Personal details
- Born: December 24, 1898 Sichuan Province, China
- Died: November 27, 1993 (aged 94) Toronto, Canada
- Resting place: Mount Pleasant Cemetery, Toronto
- Party: Cooperative Commonwealth Federation (1941–1944)
- Spouse: Mary Elsie Austin
- Children: Norman Endicott, Stephen Endicott, Shirley Endicott, Michael Endicott
- Parent(s): James Endicott; Sarah Endicott
- Education: University of Toronto
- Occupation: Peace activist, Christian minister, professor
- Awards: Stalin Peace Prize

Military service
- Branch/service: Canadian Army
- Rank: Private
- Battles/wars: First World War

James Gareth Endicott (December 24, 1898 – November 27, 1993) was a Canadian Christian minister, missionary, and socialist.

== Family and early life ==
Endicott was born in Sichuan Province, China, the third of five children to a Methodist missionary family and became fluent in Chinese. His family returned to Canada in 1910. His father, James Endicott, was elected the second Moderator of the United Church of Canada from 1926 to 1928.

Endicott enlisted in World War I as a Private. After the war he was educated at the University of Toronto's Victoria College where he was president of the student council and a founder of the university's Student Christian Movement.

Endicott earned a master's degree and was ordained as a minister in the United Church of Canada. In 1925, Endicott returned to China as a missionary remaining there for most of the following two decades.

== Missionary in China ==
While Endicott was a missionary in China, he taught English in China and became professor of English and Ethics at West China Union University. He became social advisor to Chiang Kai-shek and political advisor to his New Life Movement and served as an advisor to US military intelligence from 1944 to 1945 as a liaison between the American military and the Chinese Communist forces fighting against the Japanese in World War II.

Initially a supporter of Chiang Kai-shek and his wife, he once compared Chiang to Abraham Lincoln and described Madame Chiang as a combination of Helen of Troy, Florence Nightingale and Joan of Arc. He became disillusioned after seeing Chiang's officers starve their troops and by the Kuomintang's corruption.

Endicott was impressed by the Communists and became friends with Zhou Enlai as the Chinese Civil War resumed, and he became a supporter of the Chinese Communist Party. During the war he provided an underground network where pro-communist forces could meet and exchange ideas.

After the war, he spoke at student demonstrations, urging opposition to the Nationalist government and provoking criticism from the church in Canada. This led to his resignation from the ministry and the mission on May 5, 1946, after the United Church of Canada gave him an ultimatum to either modify his public statements or quit. In August 1946 Endicott was invited to help write a constitution for the new League for the Protection of Human Rights in China. Paul Yen, Talitha Gerlach, Y. T. Wu and other liberals were also asked to participate. At Zhou Enlai's urging, he moved to Shanghai to publish the underground anti-Kuomintang Shanghai Newsletter. The newsletter was aimed at westerners in the Kuomintang stronghold as well as at trying to convince western governments that Chiang's regime was corrupt and dictatorial.

== Return to Canada ==
In 1947, he returned to Canada. At a time when western countries were backing Chiang and were optimistic about his government, Endicott advised the Canadian government that the Kuomintang regime's fall was imminent and then went public with his predictions and his denunciation of the Kuomintang as corrupt. His comments were denounced as traitorous by the media and he was labelled the most reviled Canadian of the year for his support of the Chinese Communist Revolution and the Chinese Communist Party and was criticized by the United Church for his support of the revolution.

He continued his support for the Chinese Communist Party by giving lectures and publishing the Canadian Far Eastern Weekly which had 5,000 subscribers at its peak.

== Canadian Peace Congress ==
In 1949, he founded and became chairman of the Canadian Peace Congress and helped publish its Peace Letter bulletin. He also became a senior figure in the World Peace Council serving as president of the International Institute for Peace from 1957 until 1971.

In 1950, as a Canadian delegate to the World Peace Council in Stockholm, Endicott sat on the committee that drafted the Stockholm Peace Appeal which was the petition that began the international "Ban the Bomb" movement.

== Korean War ==
Endicott returned on a visit to China in 1952, during the Korean War and, on his return to Canada, charged the United States with using chemical and biological weapons during the war. His charges led him to be vilified in the Canadian press as "public enemy number one" and he was censured by the United Church for his support of Mao Zedong and the Chinese Communists.

He was condemned by Canadian politicians, including Lester Pearson who had been a college friend. Pearson called him the "bait on the end of a Red hook" and a "Red stooge" while John Diefenbaker called his statements "damnable," and Conservative leader George Drew referred to Endicott as a "jackal of the Communists."

The government threatened to charge him with treason and sedition, but did not follow through, while others called for him to lose his passport and mailing privileges.

== Later work ==
Endicott was awarded the Stalin Peace Prize in 1952 for his efforts working for "peaceful coexistence between the Christians and the Communists". He continued his advocacy for the People's Republic of China by publishing the Canadian Far East Newsletter and though he publicly backed the Soviet Union in the initial years of the Sino-Soviet split, he was sympathetic to China's arguments and reported them in the newsletter. Endicott was offered the presidency of the World Peace Council in the early 1960s but declined due to his wife's declining health and what he anticipated as a personally untenable position of leading the council during a period of growing tensions between the Soviet Union and the People's Republic of China and their respective factions on the council.

In 1982, the United Church extended a formal apology to Endicott for having denounced him three decades earlier, acknowledging that it had caused him "much personal hurt and anxiety".

In 1983, Endicott was awarded an honorary doctorate of law by York University.

== Tiananmen Square and later views on China ==
In an interview shortly before his death, Endicott said that he thought the Communist Manifesto is "still as true as ever," though he feels the "old men" who are Communist leaders like Deng Xiaoping are not progressive enough.

Though ambivalent about the policies of Deng and initially supportive of the Tiananmen Square protests of 1989, Endicott was sympathetic to the Chinese government's dilemma in dealing with what he came to see as a counterrevolutionary movement. He told an interviewer,

What is more clear to me now is that there was a core of students who were concerned mainly with getting something done about corruption in the party and in the society. I said at the time they should be supported. But a lot of the leaders, who at the time appeared to be idealistic, turned out to be agents for a capitalist restoration. It appears now that the Communist government was relatively correct in saying that very few people were killed in Tiananmen – perhaps two or three hundred, at most. But in another western section of Beijing, a lot of people were killed. There was practically a shoot-out between the capitalist roaders and the socialists – if you can call the army socialists.

Arguing that there was an attempt to overthrow the Chinese government, Endicott stated,

What took place was a minor civil war. The army's action in upholding the constitution probably prevented the capitalist roaders from really making an attempt to take over by military force. What was the government to do? Not react?

== Relationship with Canadian Communists ==
In 1971, William Kashtan, general secretary of the Communist Party of Canada asked him to resign from the Canadian Peace Congress and as Canada's delegate to the World Council of Peace accusing the Canadian Far East Newsletter of being anti-Soviet and pro-Mao. Endicott agreed to leave the organization rather than stop publication of the newsletter or withdraw his support for China in its conflict with the Soviet Union. He founded the Canada-China Society shortly after leaving the Canadian Peace Congress and publicly broke with the Soviet Union.

Though friendly with Tim Buck, Stanley Ryerson, Leslie Morris and other Canadian Communists, Endicott never joined the Communist Party of Canada though three of his children joined its legal front, the Labor-Progressive Party. He had joined the Co-operative Commonwealth Federation while living in Toronto on sabbatical from 1941 to 1944, and campaigned for the party in the 1942 federal by-election in which Joseph Noseworthy won an upset victory, but his membership lapsed when he returned to China. When he applied to rejoin the CCF in 1948 his membership application was rejected; no reason was given but it is almost certain it was rejected due to Endicott's perceived association with Communism.

== See also ==
- List of peace activists

== Sources ==
- Endicott, Stephen James G. Endicott: Rebel Out of China (1980) ISBN 0-8020-2377-0
- Endicott, Shirley Jane China Diary: The Life of Mary Austin Endicott (2003) ISBN 0-88920-412-8
