= James Endicott =

James Endicott may refer to:

- James Endicott (cleric, born 1865) (1865–1954), Canadian Methodist minister and missionary and Moderator of the United Church of Canada
- James Gareth Endicott (1898–1993), Canadian Methodist minister, missionary to China, and outspoken supporter of the Chinese Communist Party
- James Bridges Endicott (1814–1870), American sea captain, opium trader, and merchant in Hong Kong, protector of Ng Akew
