= William T. Gunn =

Canadian Protestant clergy (1867–1930)

The Very Reverend Dr. William T. Gunn DD
- 3rd Moderator of the United Church of Canada
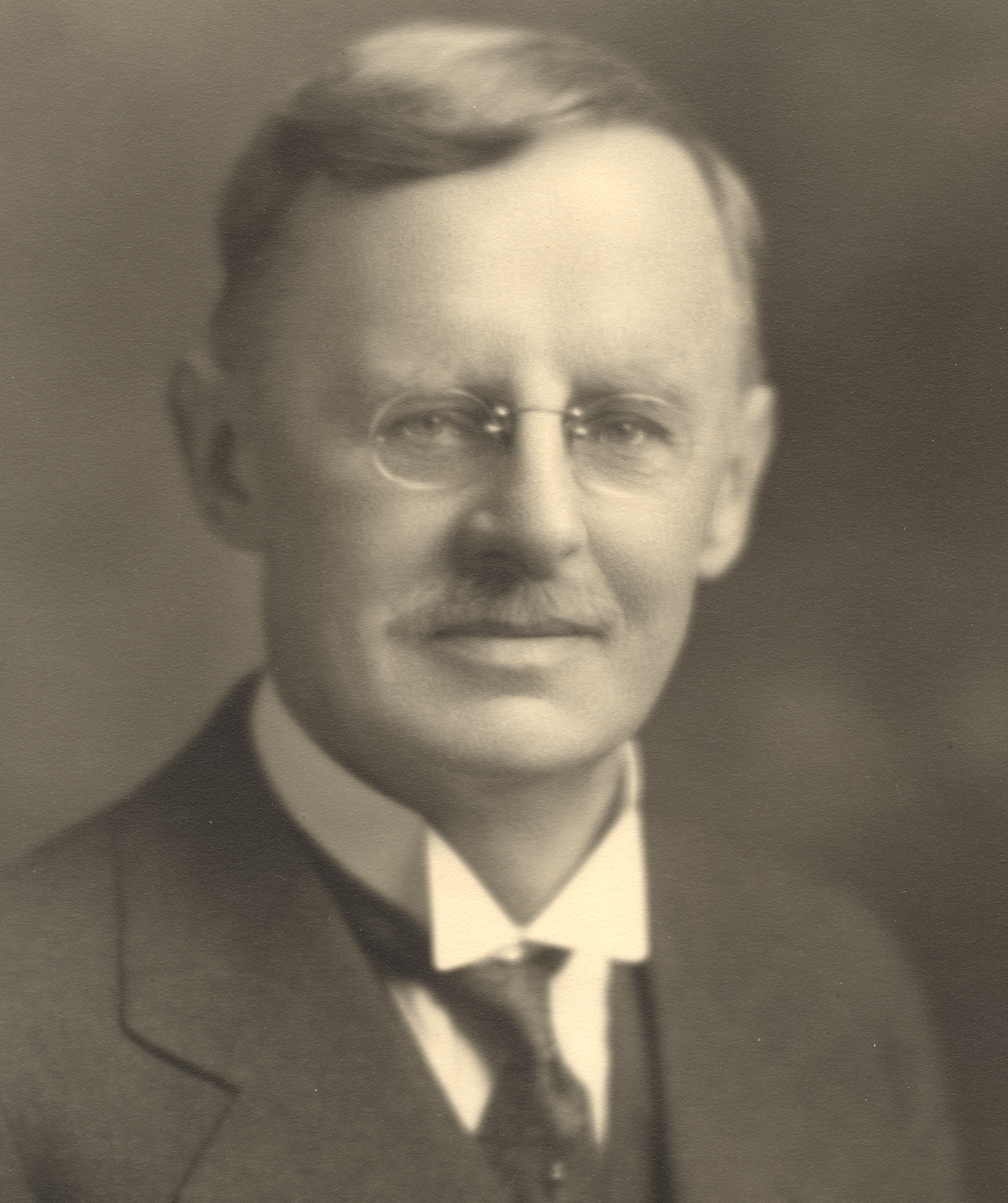
- Church: United Church of Canada
- In office: 1928–1930
- Predecessor: James Endicott
- Successor: Edmund Henry Oliver

Orders
- Ordination: 1892

Personal details
- Born: January 15, 1867 Keene, Ontario
- Died: September 30, 1930 (aged 63) Toronto, Ontario
- Denomination: Congregational Union of Ontario and Quebec; United Church of Canada
- Education: McGill University; Congregational College of Canada, Montreal

William Thomas Gunn (15 January 1867 – 30 September 1930) was a Christian minister of the Congregational Union of Canada who urged the amalgamation of Christian denominations across Canada and subsequently became the third Moderator of the newly formed United Church of Canada. Much of Gunn's work as Moderator dealt with various points of friction between the founding factions. That work exacerbated his chronically poor health, and he died less than two weeks after the end of his term.

== Early life and education ==
William T. Gunn was born in Keene, Ontario in 1867. During his formative years, Gunn attended services at both the local Presbyterian and Methodist churches, but eventually became a member of the Congregational church. After high school, he gained a bachelor's degree at McGill University in Montreal, and then entered divinity studies at the Congregational College of Canada in Montreal. During his time at school in Montreal, Gunn worked for The Witness, a daily newspaper of the Congregational Church of Canada. Although his job usually involved the business end of the newspaper, he was occasionally required to take on editorial and writing roles. Gunn entertained the idea of becoming a foreign missionary, but was forced to give up that dream when he was diagnosed with a chronic illness.

== Minister and church officer ==
In 1897, Gunn graduated with a Doctor of Divinity and was ordained as a minister in the Congregational Church. He first served in Cowansville, Quebec, and then for many years in Embro, Ontario. With his background in writing developed during his time at The Witness, Gunn began to contribute stories and articles to Christian newspapers such as The Sunday School Times and The Congregationalist and Christian World., and became a "prodigious writer." Gunn also became the treasurer of the Congregational church's Foreign Missionary Society. As a result of this and his writing, Gunn became a well-known figure in the Canadian Congregational church.

In 1903, Gunn left pastoral ministry after being commissioned by the Congregational church to visit all the congregations of the Union to raise funds for the Congregational Jubilee Fund. Three years later, Gunn became the Congregational Union's first full-time officer, serving as Secretary of the Congregational Union of Canada and as Secretary of the Canada Congregational Missionary Society for the next 19 years.

== A voice for amalgamation ==
In the early 20th century, the main Evangelical Protestant denominations in Canada were the Presbyterian, Methodist and Congregational churches. Many small towns and villages across Canada, such as Gunn's hometown of Keene, had all three, with the town's population divided among them. Especially on the Prairies, it was difficult to find clergy to serve all these charges, and there were several instances where one minister would serve his congregation, but would also perform pastoral care for the other congregations that lacked a minister. Ar the same time that Gunn became the leading figure of the Congregational church, a movement to unite all three major Protestant denominations began.

Gunn immediately became an "activist for union", writing many articles and pamphlets in support of amalgamation of the three denominations. In one pamphlet titled "Uniting Three United Churches", he wrote,

"From the very first days of [the settlement of Canada], the foundations of our Protestant churches have been laid in Church Union. Our forefathers found themselves drawn together by the spiritual needs of the scattered settlements, by the intermingling of members of different churches in each small settlement and by the fact that the grounds of difference which existed between them in the old lands were not present in the new."

Gunn's pamphlet went on to say that a union was not to be feared, pointing out that all three denominations has undergone many previous unions — for example, the Presbyterian church in Canada was the result of nine different unions, and the Methodist Church the result of eight different unions. Herbert W. Barker noted that Gunn often lightened his writing "with humorous descriptions of ancient squabbles and reconciliations."

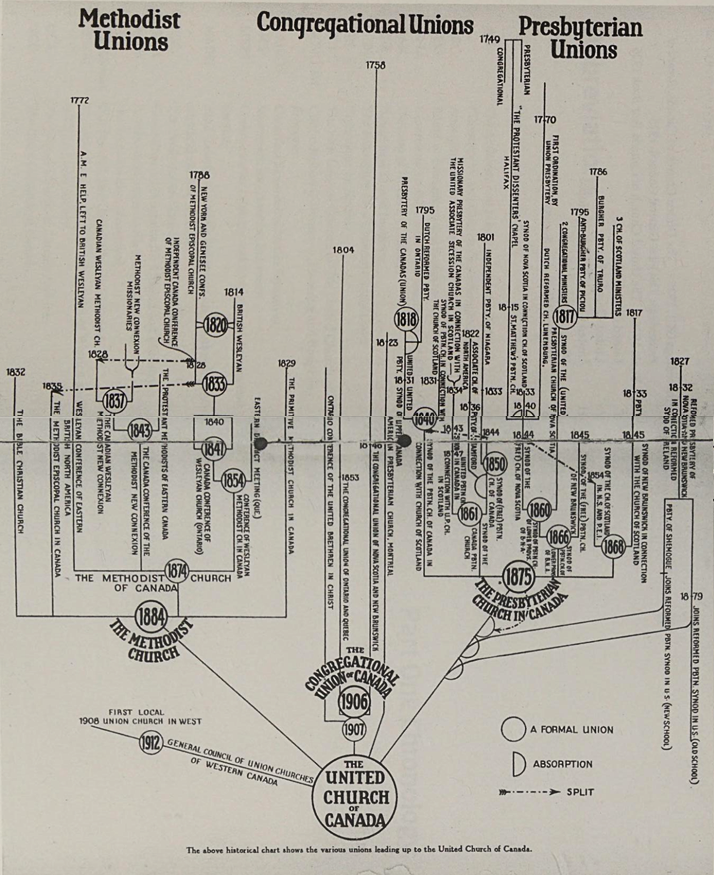
Gunn's genealogical chart of church unions leading to the United Church of Canada

One of Gunn's most influential works was his 1917 book His Dominion, in which he put forward the vision that there should inevitably be one single church for the Christian nation that Canada would become, "one great National Church of all that love God, working together to make our Dominion His Dominion from sea to sea and all the kingdoms of this world the kingdoms of our Lord and His Christ." Another significant document was Gunn's "family tree" diagram of the three denominations that showed their genealogical roots going back to 1817. Don Schweizer later wrote "The visual power of the diagram made it easy ... to understand The United Church as the natural destination of Canadian church history."

By 1917, Gunn had become a member of the Congegational Committee on Co-operation of the Congregational Union, and worked with representatives of the Presbyterian and Methodist churches to create a suggested plan for amalgamation of the three denominations.

By 1924, the three denominations had worked out a framework for a single denomination, which would require an act of Parliament. Gunn went to Ottawa representing the Toronto District Association of Congregational Churches in support of the petition to enact the United Church of Canada Act, and was recognized in the Visitor's Gallery on 9 May 1924 by House of Commons Speaker Rodolphe Lemieux.

== Union ==
Gunn, as the most well-known member of the Congregational faction, became a member of the First General Council of the new United Church of Canada in April 1925, at which George C. Pidgeon, leader of the Presbyterian faction, was chosen as the first Moderator. On June 10, 1925, the United Church of Canada was formally inaugurated, and Gunn resigned his posts within the Congregational church to become part of the new administration. He quickly organized the Committee on Literature, Publicity and Missionary Education to oversee publication of series of books, pamphlets, articles and photographs covering the missionary work of The United Church, and served as secretary of the committee until his death.

In 1927, Gunn and his wife accompanied the second Moderator of the church, James Endicott, on a year-long trip to India to ensure that all of the missionary projects that had originally been set up by each of the three denominations were all being supported by the United Church. Gunn later wrote of the favourable impressions he had received about the good work being done for the poor and oppressed.

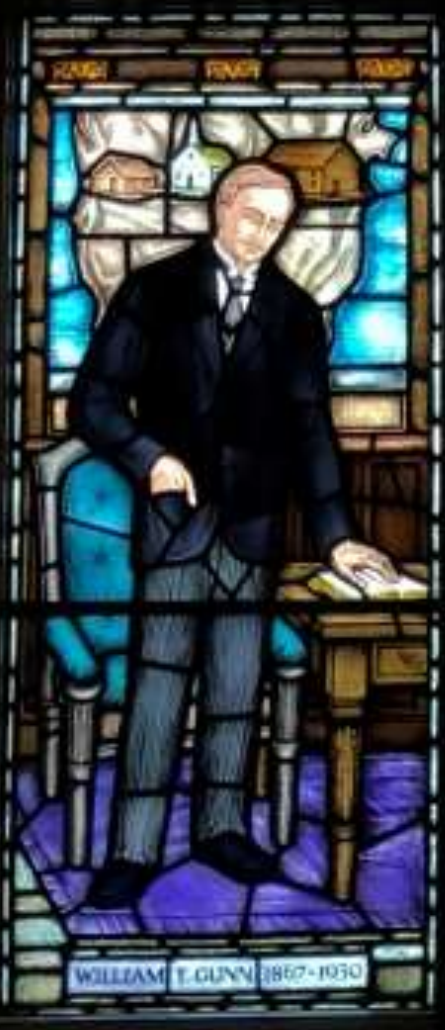
Stained glass window portraying Gunn, Bloor Street United Church, 1959

== Moderator ==
The first Moderator, George C. Pigeon, had led the Presbyterian denomatinon entering the United Church, and the second had been James Endicott of the Methodists. At the third General Council of the United Church in 1928, it made sense to choose the most well-known Congregationalist, William T. Gunn, as the third Moderator.

As Moderator, Gunn travelled to the United Kingdom to speak about the new United Church. He also spent a lot of time working on issues arising from the different ways that the three denominations had done things before amalgamation. The committee working on a new hymn book had to keep a fine balance of hymns from each denomination. When it seemed that too many old favourites were going to be discarded in favour of more modern hymns, Gunn wrote to the chair of the hymn book committee, Alexander MacMillan, with the words "remember the common people." As a result, some hymns marked to be discarded were gathered into a section titled "Gospel Call." Church historian Don Schweitzer noted that this section of hymns "came to be popularly regarded as one of [the new hymn book's] treasures."

The settlement of new ministers after their ordination was another issue, since each of the three denominations had handled this matter differently. Four years after amalgamation, the Reformed Church Messenger called this "the most difficult problem which remains before the United Church." In the end, Gunn, along with his predecessors Pidgeon and Endicott, put forward a joint statement appealing for patience and mutual trust, giving assurances that the church was "working toward a new system which will be better than either of those which it superseded."

Gunn's overwork exacerbated his chronic ill-health, and with three months remaining in his term, Gunn's doctor urged him to relinquish his role as Moderator. Gunn refused and kept up his heavy workload. Although advised by his doctor not to attend the fourth General Council of the church in September 1930, Gunn not only insisted on going, but gave the opening address to the 400 delegates despite his obvious ill health. He recalled the progress that had been made since the church's inauguration five years before, but warned against the "corporate irresponsibility" that would result if the church tried to please all critics both inside and outside the church rather than forging its own true path.

Gunn then stepped down as Moderator, and was succeeded by Edmund H. Oliver.

== Death ==
Only ten days after Gunn stepped down as Moderator, he suffered a heart attack, followed a few days later by a second attack, which proved fatal.

== Legacy ==
- For a number of years in the early twentieth century, one of Gunn's aphorisms regularly appeared as filler in Christian newspapers: "The measure of a man's difficulties is the measure of God's trust in him."
- Reginald Maxwell and Sophia Lyon Fahs quoted Gunn, when asked the question "Do we really enjoy the new mixed fellowship [of the United Church]?" as replying "Beyond all expectations."
- In 1959, a set of nine stained glass windows was created for the narthex of Bloor Street United Church that illustrated Canadians who had been important in the establishment of the United Church in Canada and its origins in the Congregationalist, Methodist and Presbyterian congregations. One of the windows was dedicated to William T. Gunn.

Religious titles
Preceded by James Endicott	Moderator of the United Church of Canada; 1928–1930	Succeeded by Edmund H. Oliver
