= Standard Theatre (Toronto) =

Theatre in Toronto, Ontario, Canada

Coordinates: 43.65321°N 79.39776°W

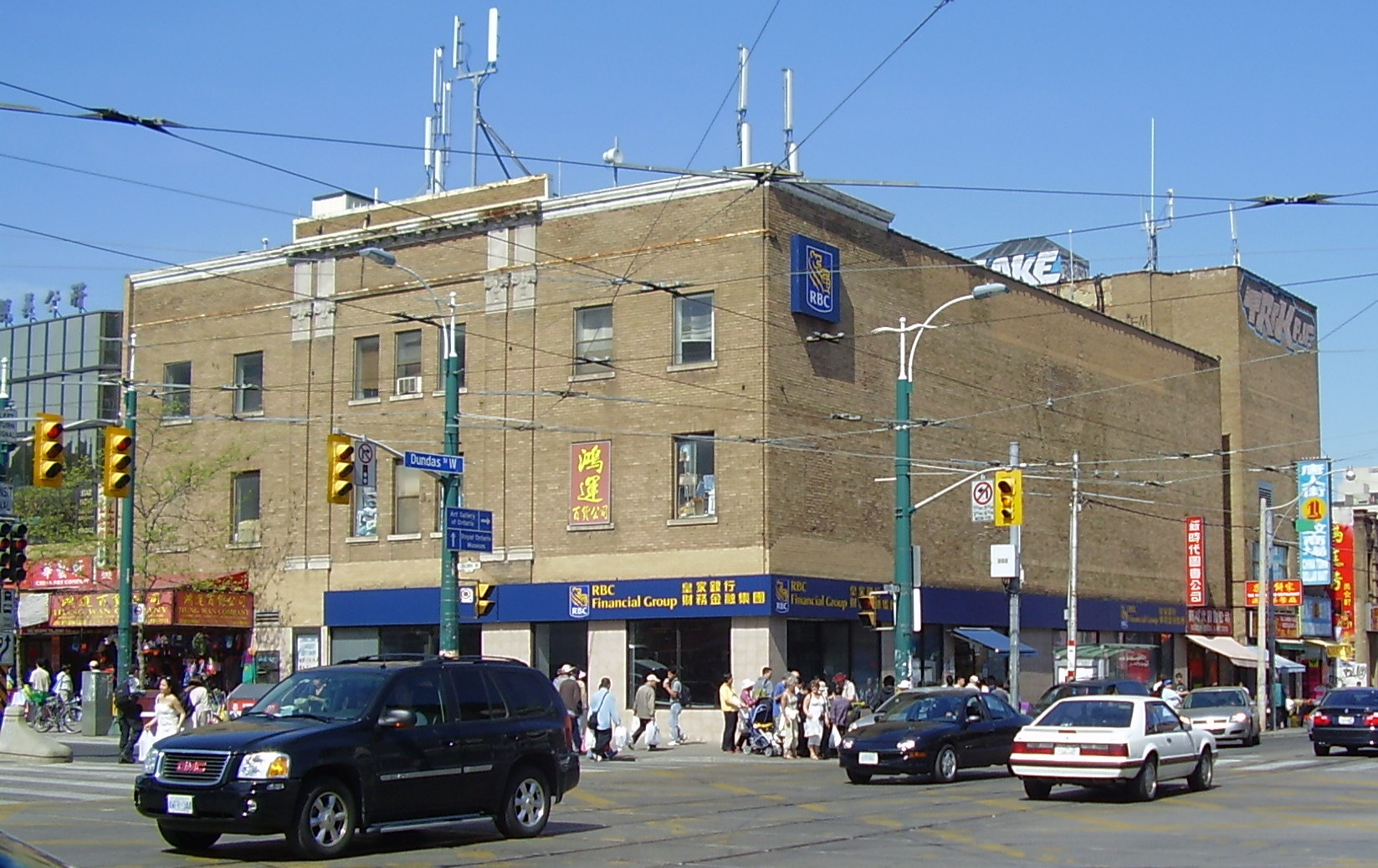
The former Standard Theatre

The Standard Theatre is an inactive theatre in Toronto that originated as the city's main venue for Yiddish theatre, and later became the Victory Burlesque, which would be the last traditional burlesque theatre in Toronto when it closed in 1975. It is located at 285 Spadina Ave. the corner of Spadina Avenue and Dundas Street.

The building was erected in 1921 as the Standard Theatre, a venue for live action Yiddish theatre, and was described as the only building in North America built for the purpose of being a Yiddish theatre. It was designed by Benjamin Brown, one of the city's first Jewish architects, and financed by selling shares to members of the large Jewish community of Kensington Market. The theatre was home to a large number of productions of classic Yiddish works, comedy, and translations such as Shakespeare in Yiddish. It was also a centre of Jewish left-wing political activism. The centre for the activities of the Progressive Arts Club. In 1929 an event commemorating the death of Vladimir Lenin was raided by police. In December 1933, the agitprop play Eight Men Speak about the imprisonment of Canadian Communist leader Tim Buck premiered. The police ordered the play closed and threatened to revoke the theatre's licence if the play was performed again.

The theatre remained a centre of Toronto's Jewish community until the building was converted into a mainstream movie cinema known as The Strand, which opened in October 1934. In 1941, it became the Victory, a cinema in the Twentieth Century Theatres chain. The theatre consisted of a single stadium seating screen and concession area selling snacks. Stairs from the street level on Spadina took moviegoers to the screen.

In 1961 it became the Victory Burlesque, joining the Lux (which had opened in 1959) and the Casino (which has existed since the 1930s) as one of three burlesques in Toronto but by the mid-1960s, the Victory was the sole traditional burlesque in the city. It became an iconic destination, especially for students from the nearby University of Toronto. In its last years, it also featured musical acts such as the New York Dolls, Kiss, The Stooges and Rush. Facing competition from adult theaters and modern strip clubs it closed in 1975.

The Jewish community had left the area, and Dundas and Spadina was now the centre of Toronto's Chinatown. The Victory was thus sold and subdivided in 1975 into shops on the main floor and a Chinese language cinema upstairs, first named the Golden Harvest under ownership by the iconic Hong Kong cinema and then the Mandarin. This cinema closed in 1994, and the building was renovated and is home to a number of retail stores. An independent theatre, Acacia Centre for the Performing Arts, opened in 2010, but it is no longer active.

The former ticket office is gone and the newer staircase to the upper levels is now a retail area.

== Current and former tenants ==
Current tenants are:

- Modern Gifts and Varieties - Dundas Street West
- Rexall Pharma Plus - Corner Ground Floor previously occupied by RBC

A number of other areas have been vacant:

- China Town Dollar Mart (dollar store in basement) was closed late 2016
- Shunyun Food at 285 Spadina Avenue was shuttered in 2016
