= Edward Cecil-Smith =

Canadian Communist and Spanish Civil War veteran (1903–1963)

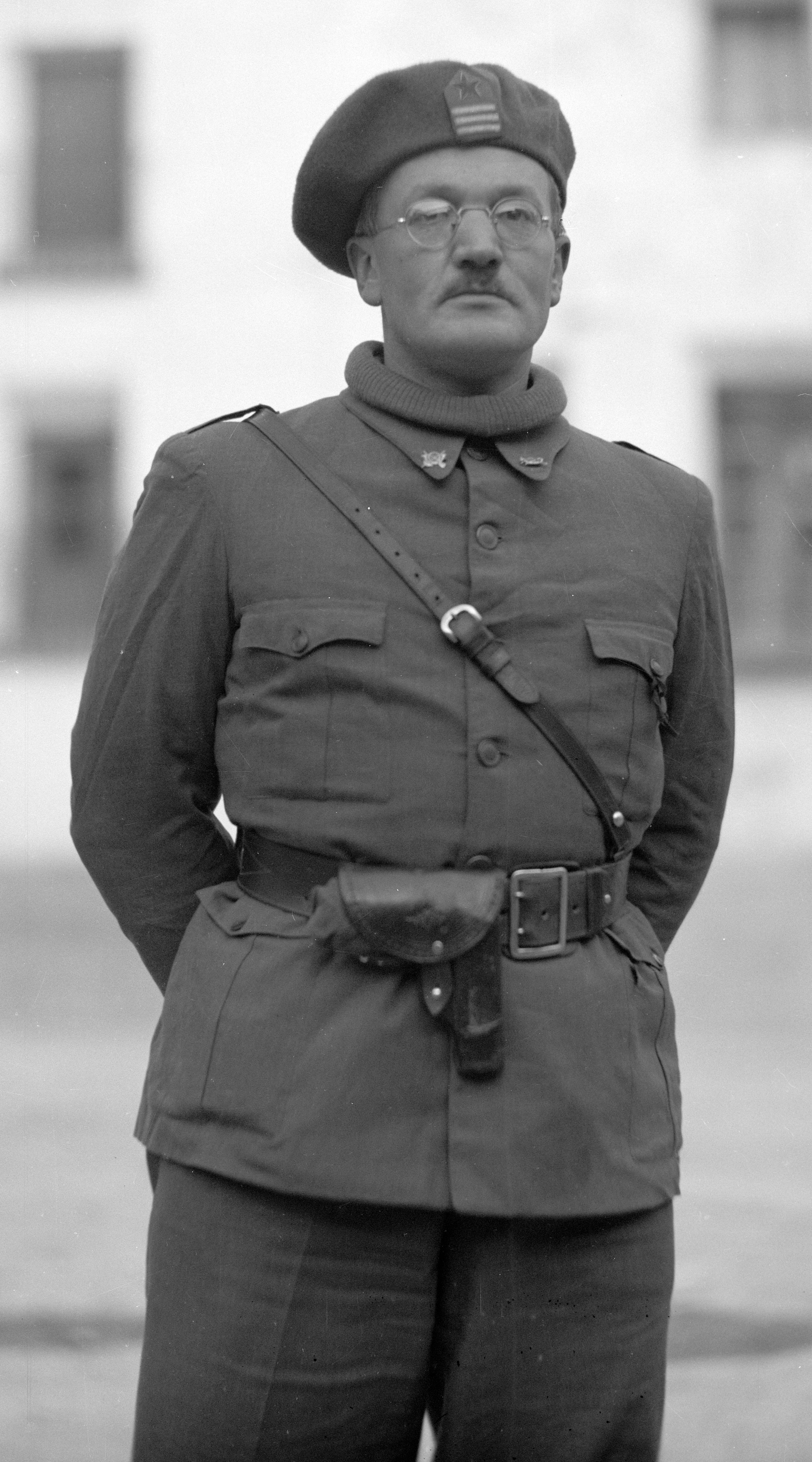
- Cecil-Smith in Spain, 1937
- Born: Edward Paul Cecil-Smith; March 10, 1903; Guiyang, China
- Died: August 17, 1963 (aged 60); Toronto, Canada
- Known for: Commanded the Mackenzie-Papineau Battalion
- Spouse: Lilian Gouge
- Children: 1; William

Edward Cecil-Smith (March 10, 1903 – August 17, 1963) was a Canadian communist, propagandist, reporter and soldier who commanded the Mackenzie–Papineau Battalion in the Spanish Civil War.

He was born and raised in China where his parents were British missionaries with the China Inland Mission. His father, Reverend George Cecil-Smith, was the Bishop of Kweichow. After attending Chinese primary schools, Edward briefly worked in Shanghai as a clerk, and also joined the Shanghai Volunteer Corps, a militia unit composed of foreigners. In 1919, he and his older sister Frances moved to Toronto. From 1921 to 1928, he served in Canada's part-time militia as an engineer, eventually achieving the rank of Sergeant-Major.

In 1931, Cecil-Smith joined the Communist Party of Canada (CPC). Two years later he was embroiled in controversy when an agit-prop play he co-authored, Eight Men Speak, was banned by the Canadian government. During his time working on the play, he met his future wife, Lilian Gouge, who was the play's stage manager and similarly involved in left-wing politics.

After holding newspaper jobs with the Toronto Star and The Mail and Empire, Cecil-Smith was a reporter with The Montreal Star when the Spanish Civil War broke out in 1936. He left for Spain in February 1937 as one of the first Canadians to volunteer with the International Brigades to fight for the Republican side.

Because of his militia experience, he was initially utilized as an instructor for newly arrived volunteers. In June 1937, he became a company commander in the George Washington Battalion. The next month, he was wounded during the Battle of Brunete while leading his company in an attack on the village of Villanueva de la Cañada. After recuperating, he joined the Mackenzie-Papineau Battalion. In November 1937, Captain Cecil-Smith became the first Canadian to command the "Mac-Paps" and led the unit for most of its existence. At the Battle of Teruel, the Mac-Paps earned a special citation for bravery, and Cecil-Smith was subsequently promoted to Major "for his brilliant leadership in the action." He was the highest-ranking Canadian in the Spanish Republican Army.

Cecil-Smith returned to Toronto in February 1939. At the start of World War II, he enlisted in the Canadian Active Service Force (CASF), but the Royal Canadian Mounted Police advocated for his removal from the CASF because of his politics. His WWII service was brief and he was honorably discharged, with the stated reason being his poor eyesight.

He eventually drifted away from the CPC and worked as a journalist for mainstream Canadian publications. He was a member of the Mackenzie Papineau Veterans Association. In the 1950s, he was a magazine editor in Montreal. After suffering a stroke in 1960, he went to a veteran's hospital in Toronto for treatment. He died in Toronto on August 17, 1963, following a second stroke.
