= Trinity (electoral district) =

Former federal electoral district in Ontario, Canada

Ontario electoral district
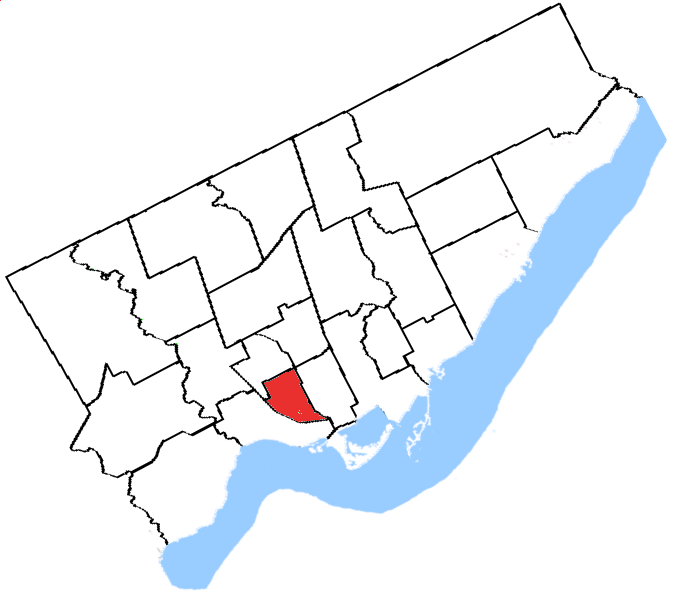
- Trinity's boundaries from 1976 to 1987

Defunct federal electoral district
- Legislature: House of Commons
- District created: 1933
- District abolished: 1987
- First contested: 1935
- Last contested: 1984

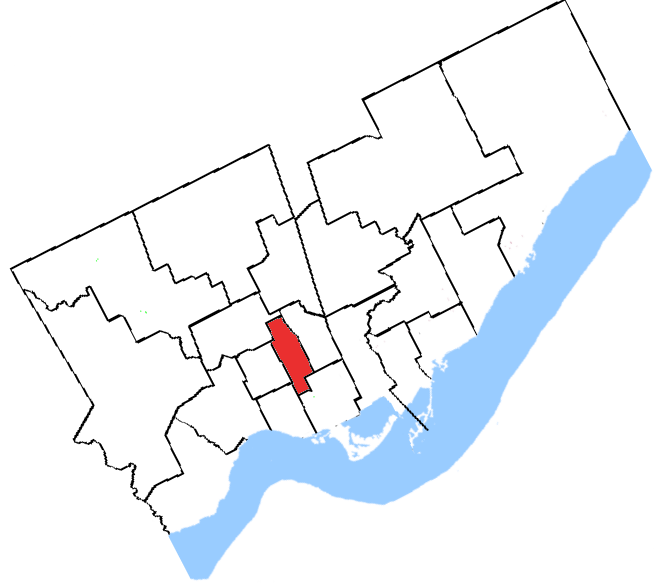
Trinity's boundaries from 1966 to 1976

Trinity was an electoral district in Ontario, Canada, that was represented in the House of Commons of Canada, 1935 to 1988. It covered a portion of western Toronto, Ontario. Its name comes from the Trinity–Bellwoods area where Trinity College, Toronto was located.

== History ==
This district was formed in 1933 from portions of Toronto Northwest, Toronto West Centre, and Toronto South ridings. Its boundaries changed repeatedly over the years; when created, it stretched far north to the edge of the city boundaries. As this northern portion became more populated, it was split off into other ridings. Its eastern and western boundaries were fairly consistent, stretching from Bathurst Street in the east to Atlantic Avenue in the West. In 1987, due to the relative decrease in the population of downtown Toronto compared to other areas, this district was merged with Spadina to form Trinity—Spadina. Some portions also went to the western riding of Davenport.

== Members of Parliament ==
Trinity elected the following members of Parliament:

Parliament	Years	Member	Party
Riding created from Toronto Northwest, Toronto West Centre and Toronto South
18th	1935–1940	Hugh Plaxton	Liberal
19th	1940–1945	Arthur Roebuck	Liberal
20th	1945–1949	Larry Skey	Progressive Conservative
21st	1949–1953	Lionel Conacher	Liberal
22nd	1953–1954†	Lionel Conacher	Liberal
22nd	1954–1957	Donald Carrick	Liberal
23rd	1957–1958	Stanley Haidasz	Liberal
24th	1958–1958†	Edward Lockyer	Progressive Conservative
24th	1958–1962	Paul Hellyer	Liberal
25th	1962–1963	Paul Hellyer	Liberal
26th	1963–1965	Paul Hellyer	Liberal
27th	1965–1968	Paul Hellyer	Liberal
28th	1968–1971	Paul Hellyer	Liberal
28th	1971–1972	Paul Hellyer	Independent
29th	1972–1974	Paul Hellyer	Progressive Conservative
30th	1974–1979	Aideen Nicholson	Liberal
31st	1979–1980	Aideen Nicholson	Liberal
32nd	1980–1984	Aideen Nicholson	Liberal
33rd	1984–1988	Aideen Nicholson	Liberal
Riding dissolved into Trinity—Spadina and Davenport

== Federal election results ==
1935 Canadian federal election
Party	Candidate	Votes
Liberal	Hugh John Plaxton	10,472
Conservative	G. Reginald Geary	9,607
Reconstruction	William Alexander Gunn	3,266
Co-operative Commonwealth	Carlo Lamberti	1,801
Communist	Norman Freed	1,470

1940 Canadian federal election
Party	Candidate	Votes
Liberal	Arthur Roebuck	14,901
National Government	George Reginald Geary	11,617
Independent	Douglas Stewart	1,071

1945 Canadian federal election
Party	Candidate	Votes
Progressive Conservative	Larry Skey	8,908
Liberal	Ernest Charlton Bogart	8,817
Labor–Progressive	Tim Buck	7,488
Co-operative Commonwealth	Herman A. Voaden	3,425

1949 Canadian federal election
Party	Candidate	Votes
Liberal	Lionel Conacher	10,389
Progressive Conservative	Larry Skey	8,423
Labor–Progressive	Tim Buck	6,438
Co-operative Commonwealth	Herman Voaden	4,522

1953 Canadian federal election
Party	Candidate	Votes
Liberal	Lionel Conacher	8,056
Progressive Conservative	Stanley Frolick	6,019
Co-operative Commonwealth	Herman A. Voaden	3,877
Labor–Progressive	Tim Buck	1,725

November 8, 1954 by-election following Conacher's death
Party	Candidate	Votes
Liberal	Donald Carrick	5,589
Progressive Conservative	Willson Woodside	4,237
Co-operative Commonwealth	Herman A. Voaden	3,700
Labor–Progressive	William Kashtan	953

1957 Canadian federal election
Party	Candidate	Votes
Liberal	Stanley Haidasz	7,068
Progressive Conservative	Wilfrid Gordon Pilsworth	6,564
Co-operative Commonwealth	Frank Ancevich	4,343
Labor–Progressive	John Weir	764
Social Credit	David Roland Milne	539

1958 Canadian federal election
Party	Candidate	Votes
Progressive Conservative	Edward R. Lockyer	10,203
Liberal	Stanley Haidasz	8,177
Co-operative Commonwealth	Frank Ancevich	3,170
Labor–Progressive	Tim Buck	851

December 15, 1958 by-election following Lockyer's death
Party	Candidate	Votes
Liberal	Paul Hellyer	5,175
Progressive Conservative	Joe Lesniak	4,404
Co-operative Commonwealth	John Elchuk	1,724
Labor–Progressive	Sam Walsh	488

1962 Canadian federal election
Party	Candidate	Votes
Liberal	Paul Hellyer	9,615
Progressive Conservative	Stanley Frolick	6,124
New Democratic Party	Thomas Paton	3,740
Communist	Leslie Morris	449
Independent	Peter D'Agostino	295
Social Credit	David E. Hartman	227

1963 Canadian federal election
Party	Candidate	Votes
Liberal	Paul Hellyer	10,595
Progressive Conservative	John Wasylenko	5,171
New Democratic Party	Thomas Paton	3,512
Communist	Leslie Morris	391

1965 Canadian federal election
Party	Candidate	Votes
Liberal	Paul Hellyer	9,897
Progressive Conservative	John Brazill	4,375
New Democratic Party	Enzo Ragno	2,773

1968 Canadian federal election
Party	Candidate	Votes
Liberal	Paul Hellyer	13,126
Progressive Conservative	Ed Robertson	5,360
New Democratic Party	Jim De Candole	4,177

1972 Canadian federal election
Party	Candidate	Votes
Progressive Conservative	Paul Hellyer	8,518
Liberal	Aideen Nicholson	8,334
New Democratic Party	Edward Boucher	3,725
Unknown	Norman Freed	330
Unknown	Rae Greig	134

1974 Canadian federal election
Party	Candidate	Votes
Liberal	Aideen Nicholson	10,683
Progressive Conservative	Paul Hellyer	6,537
New Democratic Party	Jonathan Cohen	2,637
Communist	William Kashtan	234
Marxist–Leninist	Jim Turnbull	90
Independent	Martin K. Weiche	64

1979 Canadian federal election
Party	Candidate	Votes
Liberal	Aideen Nicholson	10,206
New Democratic Party	Manuel Azevedo	5,504
Progressive Conservative	Frank Lacka	4,843
Libertarian	Maureen Cain	482
Communist	William Kashtan	192
Marxist–Leninist	Aili Waldman	65

1980 Canadian federal election
Party	Candidate	Votes
Liberal	Aideen Nicholson	12,628
New Democratic Party	Manuel Azevedo	5,005
Progressive Conservative	Richard Boraks	3,695
Libertarian	Vijay Basdeo	412
Communist	William Kashtan	159
Marxist–Leninist	Aili Waldman	57

1984 Canadian federal election
Party	Candidate	Votes
Liberal	Aideen Nicholson	9,811
New Democratic Party	David English	6,712
Progressive Conservative	Peter Rekai	5,120
Green	Susan Berlin	341
Libertarian	Peter W. Ring	255
Communist	William Kashtan	195
Commonwealth of Canada	Ted Ma	73

== See also ==
- List of Canadian electoral districts
- Historical federal electoral districts of Canada
