= Dominion Communist–Labor Total War Committee =

Canadian communist front

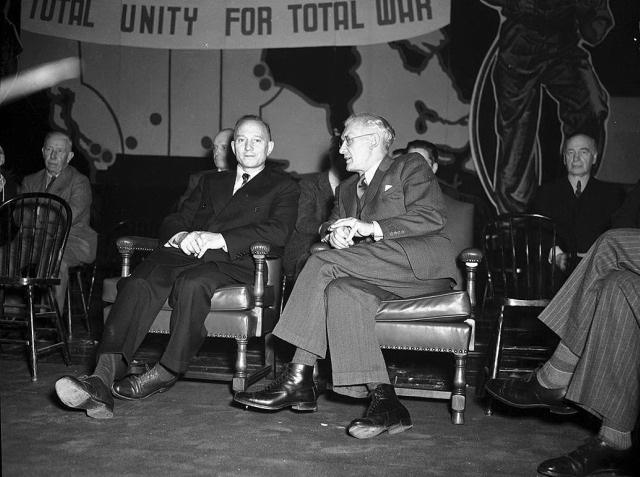
Tim Buck at a meeting in Maple Leaf Gardens

The Dominion Communist–Labor Total War Committee was a front organization of the then-banned Communist Party of Canada. The Committee originated as the "Tim Buck Plebiscite Committees" which were organized by the party in 1942 to campaign for a "yes" vote in the 1942 referendum on conscription (see Conscription Crisis of 1944).

The Communist Party in Canada was under the control of Tim Buck (1891–1973), who was loyal to the Kremlin. Buck came to prominence as a supporter of Joseph Stalin, and became General Secretary of the Communist Party of Canada in 1929 after the old party leadership had been purged for supporting Leon Trotsky and others had been removed for supporting Nikolai Bukharin. Buck remained General Secretary of the Canadian party until 1962, and was an unquestioning supporter of the Soviet line throughout his tenure.

The Party was banned in May 1940 soon after the outset of World War II under the Defence of Canada Regulations of the War Measures Act. This was due to the party's antiwar policy. However, with the Nazi invasion of the Soviet Union in June 1941, the Communists reversed their line on the war and became hyper-supportive of the Canadian war effort. The party backed total war mobilization and created the Tim Buck Plebiscite Committees as both a way for the still banned party to organize legally and as a reflection of the party's support for conscription in the 1942 national plebiscite. Following the vote, the committee renamed itself the Dominion Communist–Labor Total War Committee and, through numerous local committees, urged a "no strike" pledge for the duration of the war and "all-out" industrial production to help the war effort. The Committee also urged the creation of labour-management committees in all war plants in order to co-ordinate production. Manitoba MLA Bill Kardash was elected president at a conference of 1,500 members.

The Committee organized pro-war rallies, including a 2 to 3,000 strong assembly in Montreal, to support the war effort and encourage trade unionists and progressives to enlist in the military.

The campaigning in support of the war helped change public opinion towards the Communists and resulted in the government's release of Communist leaders being held in detention. In 1943, Tim Buck even appeared on the same stage as Prime Minister William Lyon Mackenzie King and Ontario Premier Mitchell Hepburn during a rally celebrating the success of the Red Army's offensive. However, while the government became tolerant of Communist activity the ban on the party itself was not lifted though it was allowed to organize the Labor-Progressive Party as a legal public face.

== Sources ==
- The Left in Canada during World War II dead link
