= Federation of Russian Canadians =

The Federation of Russian Canadians is a left-leaning cultural organization for Russian immigrants to Canada and their descendants.

It is the successor of the Russian Farmer-Worker Clubs which were closed by the government at the beginning of World War II as a suspected subversive organization due to its links with the Communist Party of Canada. In 1942, after the Nazi invasion of the USSR, the organization reappeared as the Federation of Russian Canadians, known also by its Russian initials as the FRK.

At its height, the FRK had 15 branches across Canada and published a newspaper, Vestnik. In 1944, the organization had around 4,000 members but, as a result of the Cold War and the defection of Igor Gouzenko, that number fell to 2,709 by 1949. In the late 1980s, the group had less than 800 members.

While Vestnik ceased publication in 1994, the FRK still has community centres in Toronto and Vancouver.

The FRK organized some 15 branches in various Canadian cities and published the newspaper Vestnik (Herald), long the only Russian newspaper in Canada.

The FRK was associated with the Labor-Progressive Party and was affiliated with the Canadian Peace Congress.

== See also ==
- Association of United Ukrainian Canadians
- United Jewish Peoples' Order
