= Mackenzie–Papineau Battalion =

Canadian military unit in the Spanish Civil War

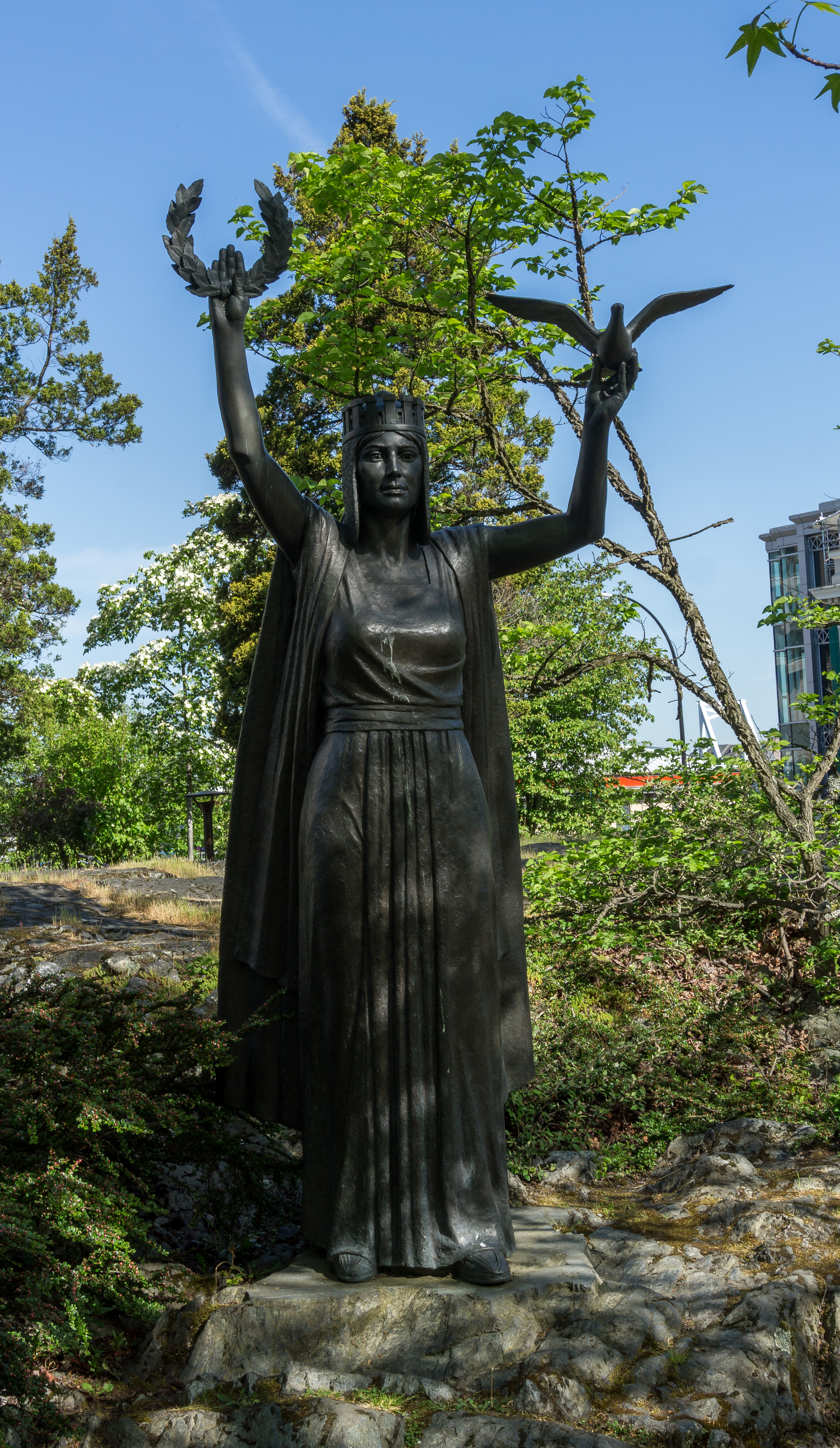
- Monument to the Mackenzie–Papineau Battalion in Victoria, B.C.
- Active: 1937–1938
- Country: Canada
- Allegiance: Second Spanish Republic
- Branch: International Brigades
- Type: Battalion – Infantry
- Role: Home Defence
- Part of: XV International Brigade
- Nickname: "Mac-Paps"
- Patron: William Lyon Mackenzie and Louis-Joseph Papineau
- Mottos: "Fascism shall be destroyed!" (Note: Motto on the battalion's flag) and "Resistance is Victory!" (Note: Motto given to the battalion by the Spanish Republican government in 1938)
- Engagements: Spanish Civil War: Battle of Jarama; Barcelona May Days; Battle of Brunete; Battle of Belchite; Battle of Teruel; Aragon Offensive; Battle of the Ebro

Commanders
- Notable commanders: Robert G. Thompson; Edward Cecil-Smith

The Mackenzie–Papineau Battalion was a Canadian military unit consisting of volunteers within the XV International Brigade, fighting on the Republican side of the Spanish Civil War. Except for France, no other country had a greater proportion of its population volunteer in Spain as did Canada. The Canadian soldiers were engaged in some of the fiercest battles of 1937 and 1938 and suffered heavy casualties.

After the war, the surviving "Mac-Paps" faced new struggles. The Canadian Foreign Enlistment Act of 1937 had prohibited citizens from participating in foreign conflicts. As a result, Canadian veterans of the Spanish Civil War were investigated as politically suspect by the Royal Canadian Mounted Police. The veterans were not recognized by national military institutions or in official histories. The prohibition was eventually eased at the end of the 20th century. Three Canadian monuments were erected to honour the Mackenzie–Papineau Battalion, including a monument commissioned by the federal government and installed in Ottawa in 2001. The names of all known Canadian volunteers are listed there.

== History ==
=== Recruitment and mobilization ===
It's estimated that three-fourths of Canadian volunteers were either members of the Communist Party of Canada (CPC) or the Young Communist League. They needed to approach their local committees to initiate the recruitment process. Unlike the American and British volunteers, who had significant numbers of students and intellectuals amongst their ranks, the Canadian contingent was almost wholly working class. Many had been unemployed and forced into relief camps during the Great Depression. A sizable percentage were recent immigrants, the two largest groups being Finns and Ukrainians.

In general, the Canadian volunteers were self-educated about the Spanish conflict and its repercussions for Europe if the pro-fascist Nationalist side prevailed. To raise awareness about the Spanish Republican cause, Canada's leftist political parties created the Canadian Committee to Aid Spanish Democracy.

Canadian volunteers who wanted to serve in Spain had to travel under false pretenses. The Parliament passed the Canadian Foreign Enlistment Act in April 1937, and applied it to the Spanish conflict in July 1937, prohibiting participation in a foreign war. Even before the prohibition went into effect, recruits assembled and transported themselves in secret to avoid potential prosecution.

Volunteers usually went first to Toronto, where they met at operation headquarters, located at Queen and Spadina streets. Applicants were screened. For the most part, anyone intending to enlist required a leftist background. Drunken and adventurous types were weeded out, leaving only those who were ardent about fighting European fascism. These factors, together with the comparatively mature age of the soldiers – nearly two-thirds were over thirty – resulted in an ideologically committed Canadian contingent. From Toronto they traveled to Montreal or, more frequently, to New York City, where they departed by ship across the Atlantic Ocean to France. They then made their way to Spain either by ship or by foot across the Pyrenees.

=== 1937 ===
In February 1937, the XVth Brigade—composed primarily of English-speaking battalions from the U.S., Britain and Canada—fought in the pivotal Battle of Jarama in which 11 Canadian soldiers were killed. By the summer of 1937, an estimated 1,200 Canadians were involved in the Spanish conflict. The first volunteers to arrive were dispatched with the Abraham Lincoln Battalion of Americans. Later, the Canadians were assigned to the North American George Washington Battalion, with approximately 40 Canadians serving in each group.

In May 1937, a Canadian battalion began to take shape. It was formally mustered into the XVth Brigade on 1 July 1937 at Albacete. The Canadian soldiers named it after William Lyon Mackenzie and Louis-Joseph Papineau, who led the rebellions of 1837–1838, and who were noted 19th century politicians, standing for a responsive, reform-minded government. The Canadians chose this name as a symbol of their national identity and their commitment to the elected Spanish Republican side against the Nationalist insurgency headed by General Francisco Franco. Training of the newcomers in the unit was initially led by Robert Merriman, who at the time was recovering from wounds received at the Battle of Jarama.

The Mac-Paps came from both the U.S. and Canada. In fact, the Americans initially outnumbered the Canadians by at least 2 to 1, and there was discussion about possibly forming another American battalion. Later, however, Canadians comprised over half of the Mackenzie–Papineau Battalion. As casualties mounted in the unit, and in the XVth Brigade overall, more Spanish-born volunteers and conscripts were added to the ranks.

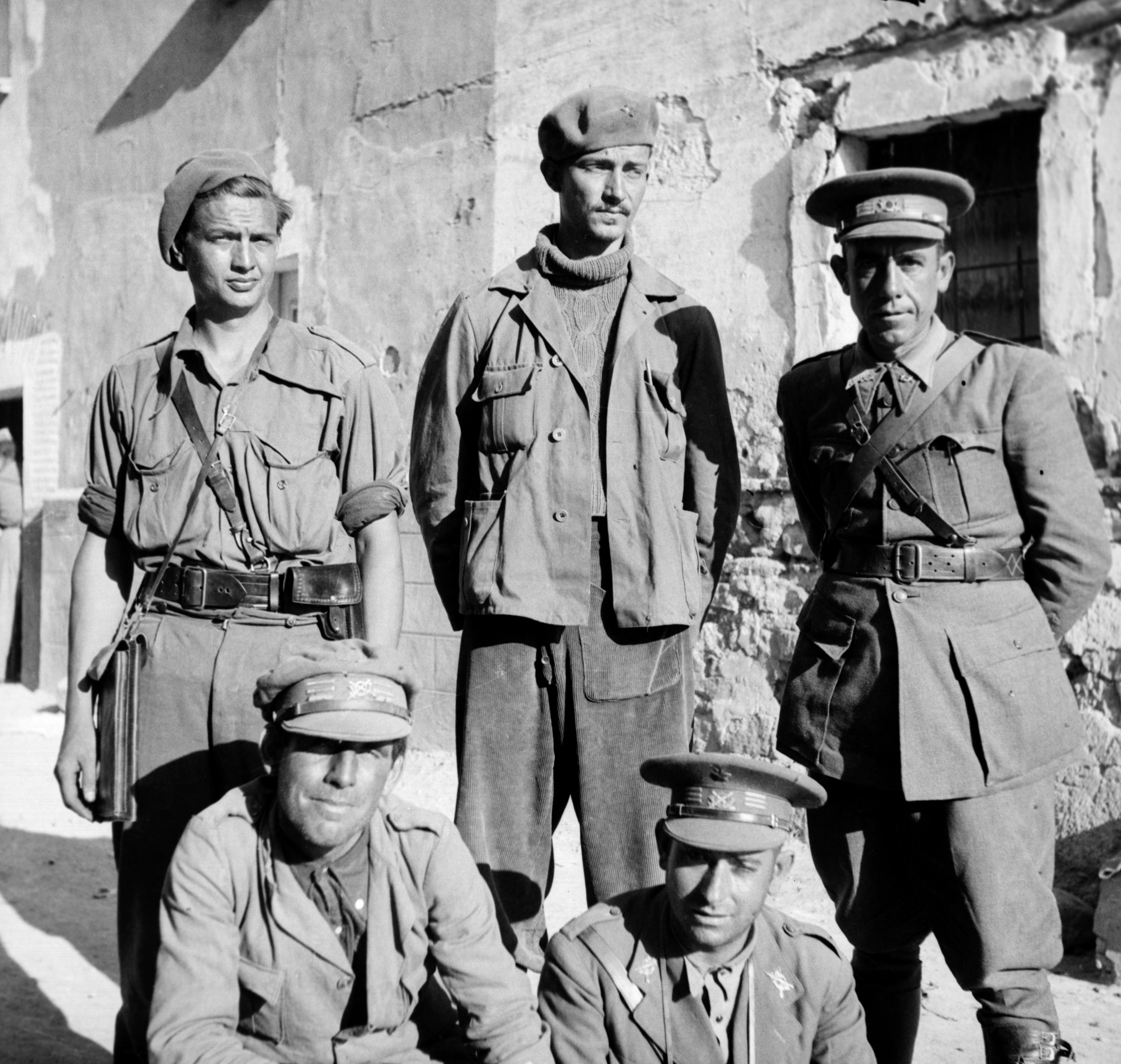
XV International Brigade Commanders, October 1937. Mac-Paps Commander Robert G. Thompson stands on the left.

In the fighting at Fuentes de Ebro in October 1937, the Mac-Paps were commanded by American Robert G. Thompson. By November, the battalion had its first Canadian commander, Captain Edward Cecil-Smith from Toronto. He was a CPC member, a co-author of the banned play Eight Men Speak, a journalist, and a former militiaman. Cecil-Smith commanded the Mackenzie–Papineau Battalion for most of its existence.

Company Three of the Mac-Paps (under Lieutenant Lionel Edwards of Edmonton) earned distinction at the Battle of Teruel (December 1937 – February 1938). After withstanding the most intense artillery barrage of the war, the Canadian soldiers held their battered trench position and routed the advancing Nationalist forces. The heroism displayed by the Canadians at Teruel won the praise of American and British war correspondents and military observers: "The Battalion received a special citation of bravery from the Army, and Captain E. Cecil Smith was promoted to the rank of Major for his brilliant leadership in the action."

=== 1938 ===
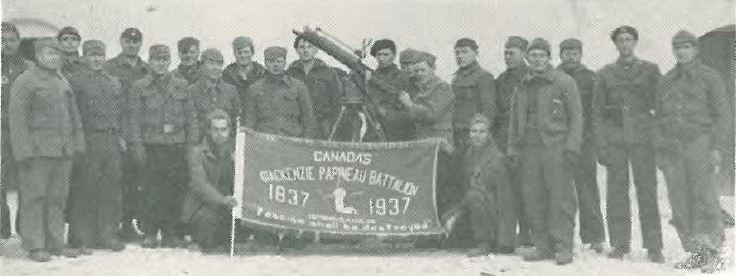
Ilkka Machine Gun Company of the Mackenzie-Papineau Battalion, composed of Finnish Canadian volunteers of the XV International Brigade.

By early 1938, the tide had turned in favor of the Nationalist side, which enjoyed superior manpower and materiel, due in large part to the aid they were receiving from Nazi Germany and fascist Italy. The Mackenzie–Papineau Battalion fought in several major 1938 battles, including the Aragon Offensive (March–April), more commonly known to Republican forces as the "Retreats". The Finnish-American machine gun companies successfully repelled the Nationalists, but the collapse of the front on their flanks compelled the Mac-Paps to join the withdrawal. It was also during this time where the Spanish Government issued the slogan "Resistance is victory!" to the Mac-Paps. Their final engagement was the Battle of the Ebro (July–September). This decisive Nationalist victory broke the back of the Republican forces.

In the end, Spanish Prime Minister Juan Negrín ordered the International Brigades withdrawn on September 21, 1938. Madrid fell 6 months later on March 28, 1939. By the end of the war, of the nearly 1,600 Canadians known to have fought in Spain, as many as 750 perished.

Returning to Canada was an arduous ordeal for the surviving soldiers, who depended on friends and family to collect the money to get them home; some soldiers were arrested in France. The Canadian government continued its policy of ignoring or prosecuting the veterans of Spain, in accordance with the Foreign Enlistment Act. It was not until January 1939 that the government agreed that the veteran combatants could return to Canada. Upon their arrival, many were investigated by the RCMP because of their Communist Party affiliations and were denied employment. A majority of Mac-Pap veterans volunteered to fight in World War II, but some were rejected as "politically unreliable".

== Legacy and commemoration ==
Because the Canadian government chose non-intervention in the Spanish Civil War, the Mac-Pap volunteers do not have official status as veterans. The Canadians who died in Spain are not included in the Books of Remembrance in the Peace Tower. Their sacrifice is not commemorated on federal war memorials or in official Remembrance Day services.

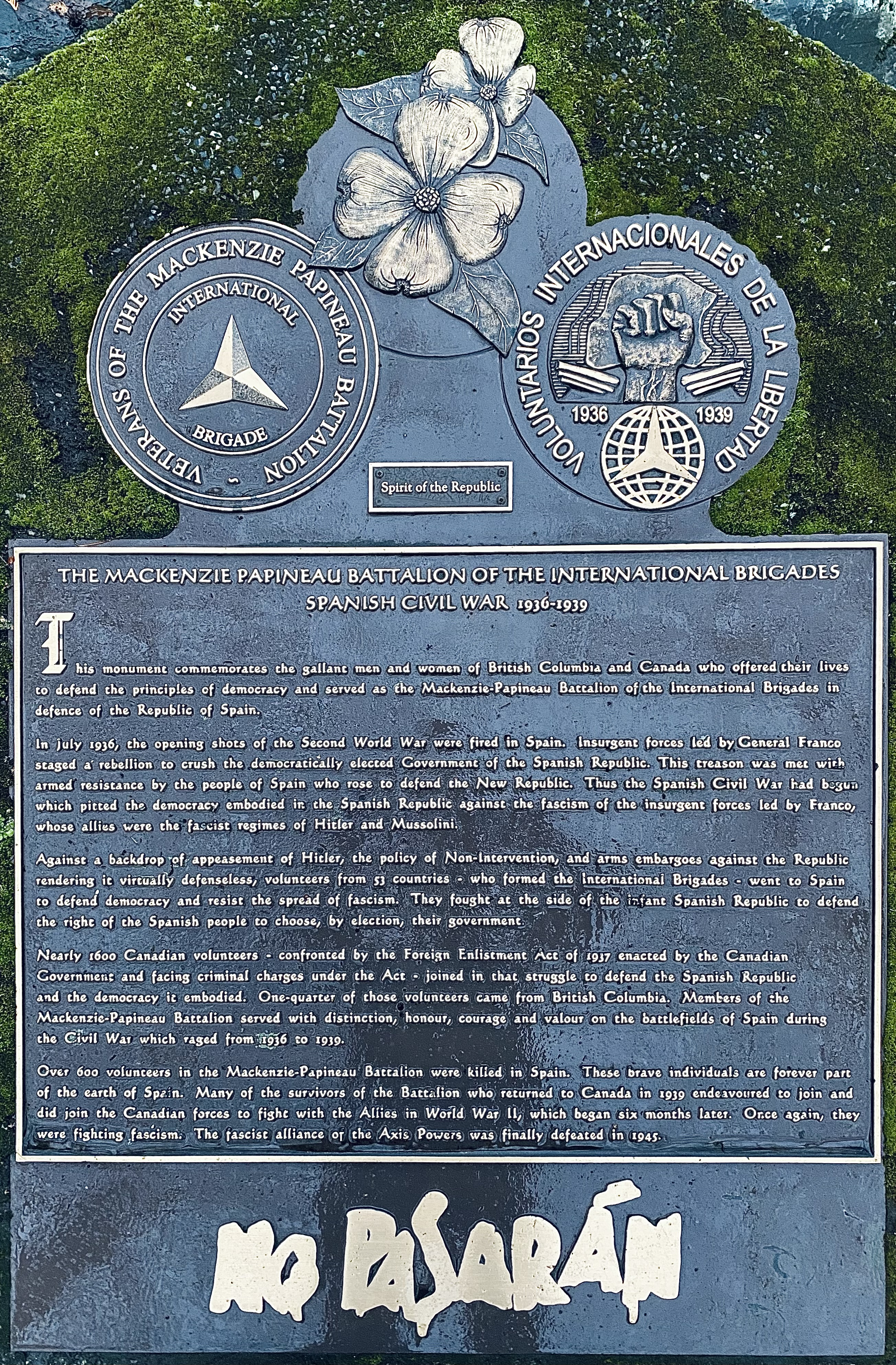
Mackenzie-Papineau plaque in Victoria, BC

A partial "thaw" occurred at the end of the 20th century. A group known as the Friends and Veterans of the Mackenzie–Papineau Battalion gained government permission to install three monuments to honour Canada's Spanish Civil War veterans. The first was erected in Toronto on June 4, 1995, at Queen's Park. The monument is a large boulder transported from the battlefield of Gandesa, Spain. Attached to the boulder is a plaque from the national Historic Sites and Monuments Board, reflecting the status of the Mackenzie–Papineau Battalion as a National Historic Event.

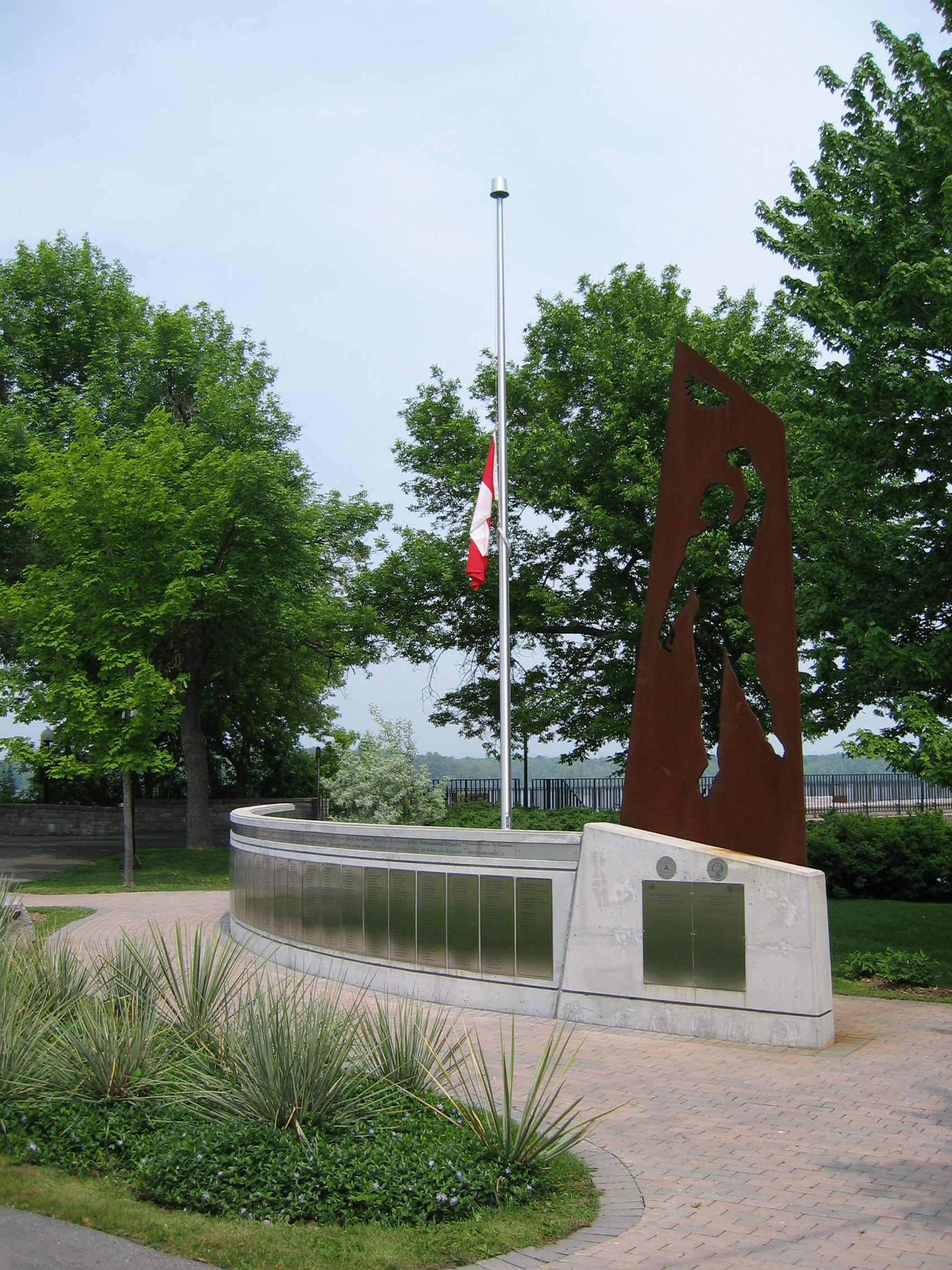
Mackenzie-Papineau monument in Ottawa

A statue to the Mackenzie–Papineau Battalion was unveiled February 12, 2000 in Victoria, British Columbia.

Another monument was erected in Ottawa's Green Island Park in 2001. This project was also organized and funded by Veterans and Friends of the Mackenzie–Papineau Battalion. The monument lists the names of 1,547 Canadian volunteers, which includes all Canadians who served in the Mac-Paps or other battalions, plus those who served in the medical, communications, transportation, and translation corps. The monument was designed by architect Oryst Sawchuk of Sudbury, selected in a juried competition by the organizers. It shows a figure of Prometheus raising his arm towards the Sun, cut out of a five-metre-high (16 ft) sheet of steel. A memorial wall is inscribed with volunteers' names.

In October 2026, a fan signed by 35 members of the battalion was donated to the Museum of Vancouver.

Dr. Norman Bethune, a key developer of mobile army medical units for the Republican side, is one of the few Canadians to be officially recognized for his service in Spain, although he did not serve in the battalion itself.

The Canadian folk band, Hudson Valley Sally, recorded a song entitled "The Mackenzie-Papineau Brigade" ("Battalion" would be correct). The song details the adventures of the Mac-Paps and their fight in Spain.

== See also ==
- Canadian League for Peace and Democracy
- International Brigades
- Spanish Civil War
- Spanish Republican Armed Forces
- Spanish Civil War – Nova Scotia
- Military history of Canada

== Bibliography ==
- Beeching, William C. (1989). Canadian Volunteers: Spain 1936–1939. Regina: Univ. of Regina.
- Petrou, Michael (2008). Renegades: Canadians in the Spanish Civil War. Vancouver: UBC Press.
- Zuehlke, Mark (2007). The Gallant Cause: Canadians in the Spanish Civil War, 1936–1939. Wiley & Sons Canada. ISBN 978-0-470-83926-3.
