= Eight Men Speak =

1933 Canadian play

Eight Men Speak is a Canadian agitprop play written in 1933 by a committee of E. Cecil-Smith, Mildred Goldberg, Frank Love, and Oscar Ryan. The play made only one performance in its initial run then was suppressed by the Canadian government. Its suppression became a political embarrassment for Prime Minister R. B. Bennett. The publicity helped cause the release of the eight imprisoned Communist Party leaders of the play's title.

== Production ==
On August 11, 1931, the Toronto offices of the Communist Party of Canada were raided by the Royal Canadian Mounted Police and eight of its members were arrested on charges of sedition, including Tim Buck and Tom McEwen. They were found guilty and sentenced to prison where, in 1932, an assassination attempt on Buck was made when shots were fired into his cell at the Kingston Penitentiary.

They were released following a campaign demanding their release, which included a petition with 450,000 signatures, and 17,000 people attended a celebratory rally in Maple Leaf Gardens. E. Cecil-Smith, Mildred Goldberg, Frank Love, and Oscar Ryan wrote an agitprop play based on the events.

== Release ==
The play's first performance at the Standard Theatre on 4 December 1933 had around 1,500 in attendance, but the police threatened to revoke the theatre's license.

When the Progressive Arts Club had a meeting to protest this censorship, a former Manitoba Labour MLA, A. E. Smith, gave a speech endorsing the play and its presentation of the attempted assassination of the imprisoned Tim Buck. Smith was arrested and charged with sedition. The resulting trial allowed Buck to take the stand and relate the events of the incident in open court. Smith was acquitted, and Buck and his comrades were soon released afterward.

== Works cited ==
- Berton, Pierre (1990). The Great Depression. Anchor Canada. ISBN 978-0-30737486-8.
- Khouri, Malek (2007). Filming Politics: Communism and the Portrayal of the Working Class at the National Film Board of Canada, 1939-46. University of Calgary Press. ISBN 9781552381991.
