= Aideen Nicholson =

Canadian politician

Member of Parliament for Trinity
- In office 1974–1988
- Preceded by: Paul Hellyer
- Succeeded by: Riding abolished

Personal details
- Born: April 29, 1927 Dublin, Ireland
- Died: May 31, 2019 (aged 92) Elliot Lake, Ontario
- Party: Liberal
- Profession: Social worker

Aideen Nicholson (April 29, 1927 – May 31, 2019) was an Irish-born social worker and Canadian politician.

== Background ==
Aideen Nicholson was born in Dublin, Ireland. She was educated at Trinity College Dublin, and later at the London School of Economics.

A social worker by profession, Nicholson worked at the Hospital for Sick Children in Toronto, taught at George Brown College and the University of Toronto and also worked at Ontario Correctional Services and as a founding member of the Ontario Commission on the Status of Women.

== Politics ==
She entered politics in the 1972 election as the Liberal candidate in Toronto electoral district of Trinity against incumbent MP Paul Hellyer, a prominent veteran MP and a former Liberal minister who contested the party leadership in 1968 and was briefly Prime Minister Trudeau's deputy. Nicholson missed ousting Hellyer, who was running as a Progressive Conservative for the first time, by less than 200 votes out of over twenty thousands. She prevailed in the 1974 federal election however, defeating Hellyer and was re-elected three times. She served as parliamentary secretary for several years:

- Parliamentary Secretary to the Minister of Consumer and Corporate Affairs (March 4-September 30, 1980)
- Parliamentary Secretary to the Postmaster General (March 4-September 30, 1980)
- Parliamentary Secretary to the Minister of Consumer and Corporate Affairs (October 1, 1978 – March 26, 1979)
- Parliamentary Secretary to the Minister of Supply and Services (October 1, 1977 – September 30, 1978)

Nicholson was one of only six Toronto Liberals who survived the catastrophic 1984 defeat when the Progressive Conservative led by Brian Mulroney won the largest number of seats in Canadian History. She served on the Liberal front bench after the party entered the opposition as Chair of the Public Accounts Committee from 1984 through 1987.

Due to redistribution, her district merged with neighbouring Spadina prior to the 1988 election, and she opted to seek the Liberal nomination in St. Paul's riding, which was held by Progressive Conservative cabinet minister Barbara McDougall. The nomination was contested by none other than her old foe Paul Hellyer, who had rejoined the Liberals in 1982. Nicholson defeated Hellyer for the Liberal nomination, but lost to McDougall in the general election.

== Later life ==
She subsequently was appointed to the Immigration Review Board.

In 2003, Nicholson was the recipient of the Distinguished Service Award by the Canadian Association of Former Parliamentarians.

Nicholson was residing in Elliot Lake, Ontario. She died on May 31, 2019.
