= Larry Skey =

Canadian politician

Lawrence Wilton Skey (October 29, 1911 – May 8, 1977) was a Canadian businessman and politician.

Skey was born in London, Ontario and educated at Ridley College and the University of Toronto where he earned a commerce degree.

He became a chartered accountant before joining the Royal Air Force in 1936 and went on to serve during World War II. He was mentioned in despatches on two occasions and was awarded the Distinguished Flying Cross. He was active in the Norwegian Campaign making reconnaissance flights over Norway's coast looking for German battleships. He also served in Singapore, India, Suez, Gibraltar, Malta and Malaya.

Skey was transferred to the Royal Canadian Air Force in 1944 and served as a wing commander. He retired from the air force in 1946 after being elected to the House of Commons of Canada as the Progressive Conservative MP for Trinity in the 1945 federal election. He served for four years until he was defeated in the 1949 federal election by Liberal Lionel Conacher.

He returned to private life and entered the investment business ultimately becoming president and director of York Associates in Toronto and also vice-president of Canadian Scudder Investment Fund.
