= Canadian Peace Congress =

Pacifist organization in Canada

- Formation: 1949; 77 years ago
- Type: Pacifist organization
- Legal status: Active
- Purpose: Advocate and public voice, educator and coalition
- Headquarters: PO Box 73593 Wychwood PO, Toronto, ON M6C 4A7
- Region served: Canada
- Official languages: English and French
- President: Larry Wasslen
- Main organ: Peace Messenger
- Parent organization: World Peace Council
- Website: www.canadianpeacecongress.ca

The Canadian Peace Congress (abbr. CPCon) is a pacifist organization founded in 1949 by Canadian minister James Gareth Endicott in response to the new dangers to peace posed because of the Cold War. It described itself as "a place where people of different views and faiths can meet and discuss world affairs... and work together as effectively as possible to improve international relations and step by step [move] towards the goal of universal disarmament and a lasting peace" The CPCon was the Canadian affiliate of the World Peace Council and a leading player in the peace movement in Canada, particularly in the 1950s and 1960s. The CPCon was active in the nuclear disarmament and anti-imperialist movements such as the movement against the Vietnam War and promoted the concept of peaceful co-existence between the Communist bloc and the Western bloc.

The CPCon was made up of affiliated local peace councils from across Canada as well as associate members including the Trade Union Peace Committee, the Labor-Progressive Party (as the Communist Party of Canada was then known), the Federation of Russian Canadians and the United Jewish Peoples' Order. Its founding meeting was attended by representatives of 47 different organizations and groups, including women's, youth and church groups, trade unions, and ethnic associations. The organization also worked closely with many CCF activists.

Active councils of the CPCon were established in: British Columbia, Calgary, Edmonton, Fraser Valley, Guelph, Halifax, Hamilton, Kamsack, London, Niagara, Peterborough, Saskatoon, Sydney, Thunder Bay, Vernon, Victoria, and Windsor. These councils were active in campaigns against the Korean War, Vietnam War, the military coup in Chile, South African Apartheid, Zionism, US interventions into Nicaragua and Panama, NORAD and NATO as well as the arms race and nuclear build-up.

The CPCon was perceived as being close to the Labor-Progressive Party and its successor the Communist Party of Canada, though Endicott, himself, was not a party member. Endicott remained the CPCon's chairman until 1971 when, according to his biography, he was pressured to resign by the leadership of the Communist Party for his pro-China views during the Sino-Soviet split. Endicott was succeeded by John Hanly Morgan who led the Congress as president until 1986. A Quebec Peace Congress, Conseil québécois de la paix, also established a nationally autonomous group separate from the Canadian Peace Congress in the 1970s. By the late 1970s, members who had authored publications for the Peace Congress included scientists, artists, musicians and writers from across the country.

During the 1980s struggles for nuclear disarmament, the Congress helped found the much broader Canadian Peace Alliance in 1985 as a more inclusive and less centralized network of peace organizations, including many newly formed groups (as opposed to the CPCon which was seen as aligned with the anti-imperialist current within the broad peace movement).

After 1986 Lari Prokop led the Congress until it became inactive in the early 1990s. At its 1991 conference, the CPCon decided to disaffiliate from the World Peace Council but the organization never formally dissolved. However, the Regina Peace Council continued its activity, publishing a regular newsletter and paying dues to the World Peace Council.

Although the Canada-wide Congress became inactive throughout the 1990s, by the mid-2000s an effort was made to re-establish Peace Councils in Edmonton and the BC Lower Mainland, in addition to Regina. The Canadian Peace Congress was then re-established in April 2006 at an Edmonton conference attended by 20 delegates from across Canada. A "Special Renewal Conference" was held in Winnipeg, Manitoba in 2008 which ratified the organization's constitution and politics and elected as president David McKee, a trade unionist, and past co-chair of the Canadian Peace Alliance. The revived Canadian Peace Congress has affirmed its continuity with the original organization, and is again affiliated to the World Peace Council. Canadian delegates have attended various international meetings, and the Peace Congress hosted a trilateral meeting of Peace Congress's from Mexico, USA and Cuba in October 2009, and again in 2016.

At the end of 2016, Dave McKee stepped down as President, and Miguel Figueroa became acting president of the Canadian Peace Congress early in 2017. He was elected President at its November 2018 convention held in Toronto.

By the end of 2018 there were active Peace Councils and/or affiliated peace coalitions in Surrey (Fraser Valley), Vancouver, and in the Southern Interior of B.C.; in Edmonton and Calgary, Alta.; Regina, Sask.; Winnipeg, Man.; Ottawa, Kingston, St. Catharines and Toronto, Ont.; and in Halifax, N.S.

== See also ==
- List of anti-war organizations
- List of peace activists
