= James Endicott (cleric, born 1865) =

The Very Reverend James Endicott
- Moderator of the United Church of Canada
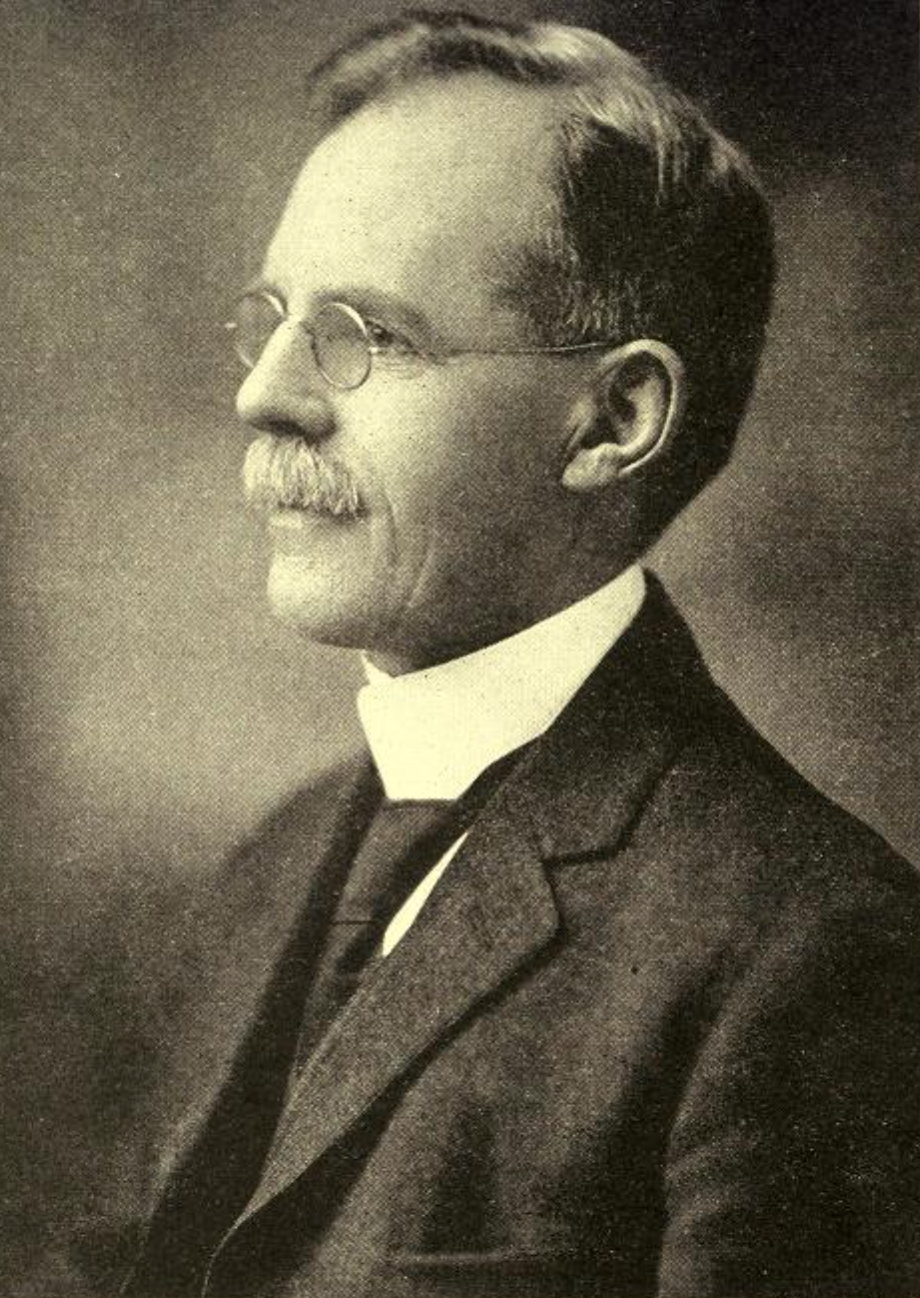
- James Endicott as the General Secretary of the Board of Foreign Missions of the Methodist Church of Canada
- Church: Methodist Church of Canada; United Church of Canada
- In office: 1926–1928
- Predecessor: George C. Pidgeon
- Successor: William T. Gunn

Orders
- Ordination: 1893

Personal details
- Born: 8 May 1865 Devon, England
- Died: March 9, 1954 (aged 88) Toronto, Ontario, Canada

James Endicott (May 8, 1865 – March 9, 1954) was a Canadian church leader, missionary and administrator, and served as the second Moderator of the United Church of Canada.

== Early life and education ==
Endicott was born in Devon, England. He emigrated to Canada with his family at the age of seventeen and grew up in a farming community on the Canadian Prairies. Endicott studied at Wesley College in Winnipeg, Manitoba, and was ordained as a Methodist minister in 1893.

== Missionary ==
Endicott and his wife moved to Chengdu, Sichuan Province, China, in 1894 as missionaries and were integral to the development of the Methodist mission already in place there. He was very influenced by the social gospel movement and was greatly impacted by the plight of the poor and oppressed he encountered while in China.

== Ministry ==
The Endicotts and their five children returned to Canada in 1910 due to the poor health of their youngest daughter and settled in Toronto where James Endicott became General Secretary of the Board of Foreign Missions of the Methodist Church of Canada in 1913. He continued in this position after union with the United Church of Canada until his retirement in 1937.

== Moderator ==
Endicott was a leading figure in efforts to merge the Methodist, Congregationalist and Presbyterian churches leading to the creation of the United Church of Canada in 1925. He served as head of the Foreign Missions Board of the United Church from its founding until his retirement.

The first Moderator of the new church, George C. Pidgeon, highly recommended Endicott should succeed him at the end of Pidgeon's term because of Endicott's dedication to and enthusiasm for missionary work. Endicott was subsequently elected Moderator of the United Church of Canada by the 2nd General Council in Montreal, Quebec, in 1926. He served as Moderator of the United Church of Canada from 1926 to 1928.

In 1927, Endicott, accompanied by William T. Gunn (who would succeed Endicott as Moderator in 1928), travelled to India as a delegate to the Golden Jubilee of the Central India Mission.

== Retirement ==
Endicott retired in 1937 at age 72, and died in Toronto in 1954, age 88.

Endicott's son, James Gareth Endicott, was also a minister and missionary in China and was close friends with Lester B. Pearson.

== See also ==
- Canadian Methodist Mission
- Methodism in Sichuan

Religious titles
Preceded by George C. Pidgeon	Moderator of the United Church of Canada; 1926–1928	Succeeded by William T. Gunn
