= George C. Pidgeon =

First Moderator of the United Church of Canada, 1872–1971

The Very Reverend George C. Pidgeon
- 1st Moderator of the United Church of Canada
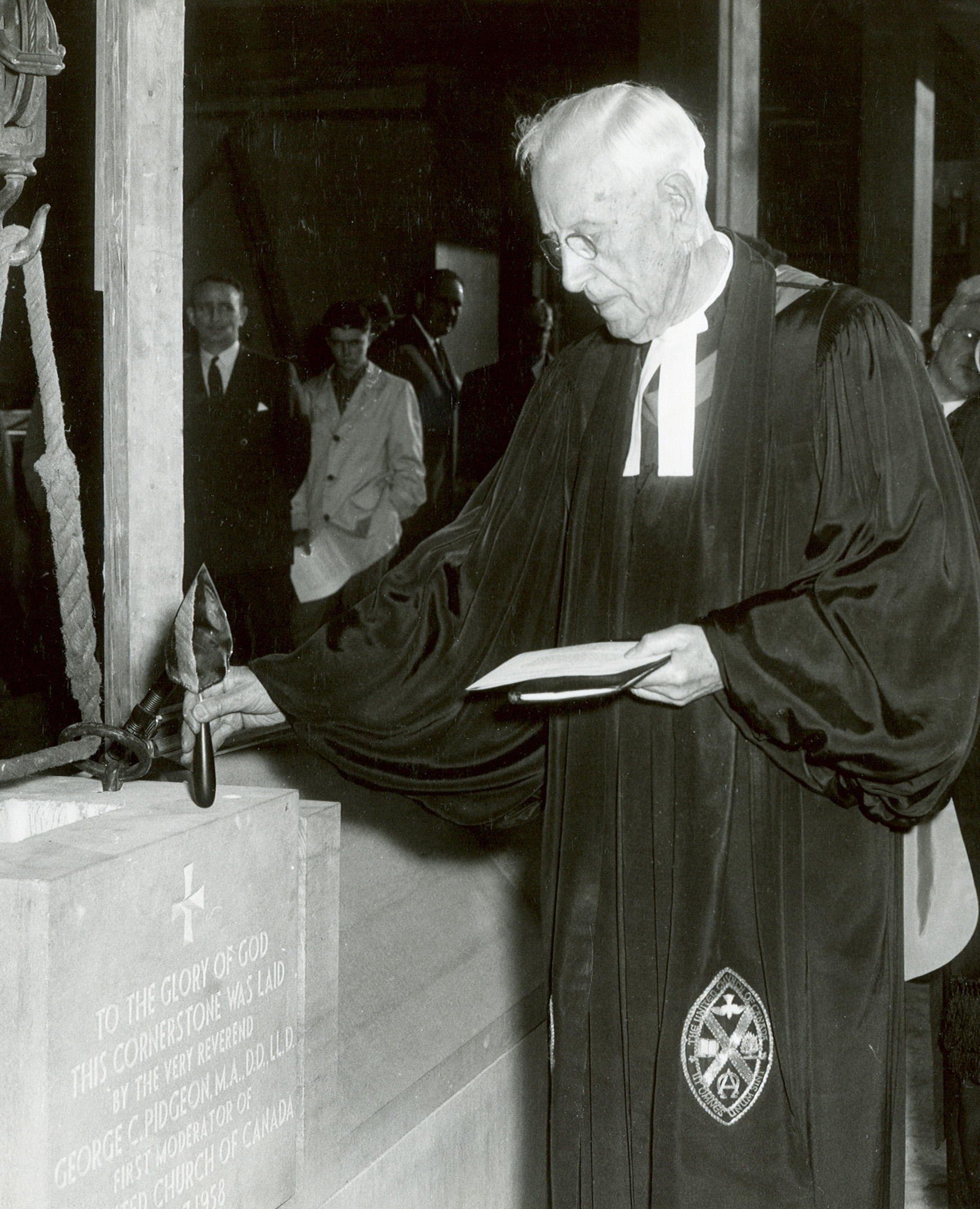
- Pidgeon dedicates the cornerstone of a wing of Royal York Road United Church, Toronto, 1958
- Church: United Church of Canada
- In office: June 10, 1925 – 1926
- Successor: James Endicott

Orders
- Ordination: 1894

Personal details
- Born: March 2, 1872 Dimock Creek, Quebec
- Died: June 15, 1971 (aged 99) Toronto, Ontario
- Denomination: Presbyterian; United Church of Canada
- Education: McGill University; Presbyterian College, Montreal

George Campbell Pidgeon (March 2, 1872 – June 15, 1971) was a Christian minister, first in the Presbyterian Church in Canada and then in the United Church of Canada, as well as the last Moderator of the Presbyterian Church before amalgamation and the first Moderator of the newly formed United Church of Canada.

== Early life ==
George Pidgeon was born on 2 March 1872 in the hamlet of Dimock Creek, near New Richmond, Quebec to farmers Archibald Pidgeon and Mary Campbell, the eldest child of four. He attended a one-room school house for early grades before moving to a larger school in New Richmond for high school. By the age of 13, Pidgeon was already planning to be a Presbyterian minister, and took Latin lessons from the local minister. However, to become a minister would require a university degree, and his family lacked the necessary funds. The wife of a local mill-owner learned of Pidgeon's plight and offered to pay for the first two years of higher education.

== Education ==
In 1887, at the age of 15, Pigeon enrolled at Morrin College in Quebec City. Two years later, Pidgeon transferred to the General Arts program at McGill University in Montreal. He graduated with his bachelor's degree in 1891 and entered Presbyterian College in Montreal. He graduated from the college as a Gold Medal winner, and was immediately ordained as a Presbyterian minister in the pastorate of Montreal West. He continued to study while working, earning his Bachelor of Divinity in 1895. In 1904, at age 32, he became the youngest Canadian to that date to earn his Doctor of Divinity.

== Ministry ==
Pidgeon first worked as a minister at various churches in Montreal, Toronto and Vancouver. He also taught at the Vancouver Presbyterian college Westminster Hall from 1909 to 1915. Leaving Vancouver in 1915, Pidgeon moved to Toronto to become the minister of Bloor Street Church. Pidgeon would remain the minister there until his retirement in 1948. During his time as minister, Pidgeon was a supporter of temperance, and was an ecumenist, promoting the World Alliance of Reformed Churches, the Canadian Council of Churches and the World Council of Churches.

== Amalgamation of denominations ==
In the early 20th century, the main Evangelical Protestant denominations in Canada were the Presbyterian, Methodist and Congregational churches. Many small towns and villages across Canada had all three, with the town's population divided among them. Especially on the prairies, it was difficult to find clergy to serve all these charges, and there were several instances where one minister would serve his congregation, but would also perform pastoral care for the other congregations that lacked a minister. On the prairies, a movement to unite all three major Protestant denominations began, resulting in the Association of Local Union Churches.

From the earliest days of the movement, Pidgeon was one of the church leaders who promoted amalgamation, and he tried to convince fellow Presbyterians to consider it. But in 1912, anti-Unionist forces within the Presbyterian Church managed to pass church policy that delayed the idea of amalgamation for over a decade.

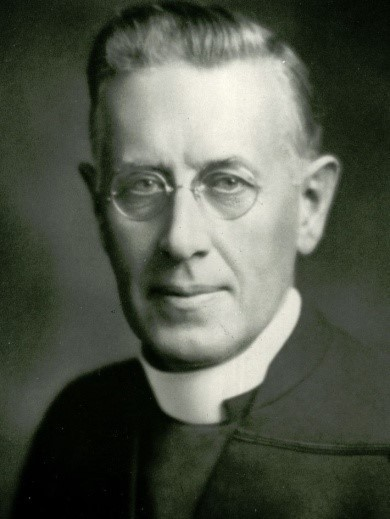
Pidgeon in 1925

== Moderator ==
In 1925, Pidgeon became Moderator of the Presbyterian Church just as amalgamation of the three denominations finally moved forward. Although the Methodists and Congregationalist joined the new United Church of Canada in their entirety, Pidgeon reluctantly went along with the Presbyterian Church's policy that every individual Presbyterian congregation in Canada could vote on whether to amalgamate. The result was that 302 (6.7%) out of 4,509 congregations of the Presbyterian Church chose not to join the new church, and instead reconstituted themselves as the "continuing" Presbyterian Church in Canada.

In his 1950 book The United Church of Canada: The Story of the Union, Pidgeon recalled those times, and although he admitted that he had agreed to the policy of conciliation that led to the decade of delay followed by the congregational vote, in his book he wrote that the Union "would have been carried through with far less disturbance and division if the [Presbyterian] Church had gone forward to its consummation in 1912."

At the first General Council of the new United Church, former Methodist General Superintendent Samuel Dwight Chown was considered the leading candidate to become the first Moderator because the Methodist Church made up the largest segment of the new United Church. In a surprise move, Chown stepped aside in favour of Pidgeon in the hopes that this would strengthen the resolve of the Presbyterians who had chosen to join the new Church. As first Moderator of the United Church of Canada, Pidgeon served for one year.

== Retirement ==
Pidgeon retired at the age 76 and turned to writing. His weekly religious column appeared in the Toronto Telegram from 1949 until 1960. Pidgeon also wrote a number of books, including The United Church of Canada: The Story of the Union (1950) and Seventy Years at Bloor Street: A History of Bloor Street United Church (1957).

Pidgeon died in 1971 in Toronto at the age of 99.

Religious titles
New office	Moderator of the United Church of Canada; 1925–1926	Succeeded by James Endicott
