= Leslie Morris =

Canadian communist leader (1904–1964)

General Secretary of the Communist Party of Canada
- In office 1962 – 13 November 1964
- Preceded by: Tim Buck
- Succeeded by: William Kashtan

General Secretary of the Communist Party of Ontario
- In office 1945–1948
- Preceded by: Position established
- Succeeded by: A.A. MacLeod

Personal details
- Born: Leslie Tom Morris; October 10, 1904 Somerset, England
- Died: November 13, 1964 (aged 60)
- Cause of death: Cancer
- Party: Communist Party of Canada
- Other political affiliations: Labor-Progressive Party (1943–1959); Communist Party of Ontario; Communist Party of Manitoba
- Occupation: Politician

Leslie Tom Morris (October 10, 1904 – November 13, 1964) was a Welsh-Canadian politician, journalist and longtime member of the Communist Party of Canada and, its front group, the Labor-Progressive Party. He was leader of the Ontario Labor-Progressive Party in the 1940s and general secretary of the Communist Party of Canada from 1962 until his death in 1964.

== Life and career ==
Morris was born in Somerset, England, to a Welsh working-class family. He and his family immigrated to Canada in 1910. Morris returned to the UK in 1917 and lived in Wales and England while working in the steel, coal mining and railway industries. He returned to Canada in time to join the Communist Party of Canada at its founding convention held December 1921 in Guelph, Ontario.

He became a prominent figure in the party first as secretary of the Young Communist League of Canada from 1923 to 1924, and then as editor over the years of various Communist newspapers including The Worker, Daily Clarion, Daily Tribune and Canadian Tribune.

Morris supported Tim Buck and the supporters of Joseph Stalin in the party during the factional struggles and purges of the late 1920s and early 1930s.

He was a candidate for the House of Commons of Canada on several occasions, but never elected:

- In the 1940 election, he ran as a Communist in Winnipeg North, coming in third place with 17% of the vote, which was larger than the number of votes separating the Conservative victor from the defeated Cooperative Commonwealth Federation incumbent, Abraham Albert Heaps.
- In a 1954 by-election, Morris was the Labor-Progressive candidate in the Toronto-area riding of York West, and came in fourth (and last) place with only 282 votes.
- In the 1958 election, he ran in York South, placing fourth out of five candidates with 427 votes.
- In the 1962 election, he ran for the Communist Party in the Toronto riding of Trinity winning 449 votes.
- He tried again in the 1963 election in the same riding, and won 391 votes

Morris also campaigned unsuccessfully for provincial office. In the Manitoba provincial election of 1932, he ran in the city of Winnipeg as a "United Front Workers" candidate (the Communist Party being under legal proscription at the time). At the time, the provincial constituency of Winnipeg elected ten members by the single transferable ballot system. Morris finished eighth on the first count, and came within 309 votes of winning the tenth seat on the final count. Had he won, he would have been the first Communist elected to a provincial legislature in Canada. Litterick would be elected in 1936 setting that record.)

Morris was a popular stump speaker for the party and toured the country speaking to left wing and labour audiences. From 1954 until 1957, he was the national organizer of the Labor-Progressive Party (as the Communist Party had been known since 1943) and, in 1962, he succeeded Tim Buck as General Secretary of the Communist Party of Canada (as it was again known) and held the position until his death two years later.

== Electoral record ==
1963 Canadian federal election: Trinity
Party	Candidate	Votes	%	±%
Liberal	Paul Hellyer	10,595	53.87	+6.85
Progressive Conservative	John Wasylenko	5,171	26.29	+3.66
New Democratic	Thomas Paton	3,512	17.86	-0.43
Communist	Leslie Morris	391	1.99	-0.21
Total valid votes		19,669		

1962 Canadian federal election: Trinity
Party	Candidate	Votes	%	±%
Liberal	Paul Hellyer	9,615	47.02	+3.13
Progressive Conservative	Stanley Frolick	6,124	29.95	-7.40
New Democratic	Thomas Paton	3,740	18.29	+3.67
Communist	Leslie Morris	449	2.20	-1.94
Independent	Peter D'Agostino	295	1.44	–
Social Credit	David E. Hartman	227	1.11	–
Total valid votes		20,450		

1958 Canadian federal election: York South
Party	Candidate	Votes	%	±%
Progressive Conservative	William George Beech	22,980	49.47	+9.44
Liberal	Marvin Gelber	13,141	28.29	-1.16
Co-operative Commonwealth	Bill Sefton	9,643	20.76	-8.19
Labor–Progressive	Leslie Morris	427	0.92	–
Social Credit	Harvey Jamieson	258	0.56	-1.01
Total valid votes		46,449		

Canadian federal by-election, September 8, 1954: York West
Party	Candidate	Votes	%	±%
Progressive Conservative	John B. Hamilton	12,228	45.3	+3.8
Liberal	Robert M. Campbell	9,768	36.2	+1.4
Co-operative Commonwealth	Bruce William Evans	4,711	17.5	-4.8
Labor–Progressive	Leslie Tom Morris	282	1.0	-0.4
Total valid votes		26,989		

1940 Canadian federal election: Winnipeg North
Party	Candidate	Votes	%	±%
Liberal	Charles Stephen Booth	13,015	40.9	+11.6
Co-operative Commonwealth	Abraham Albert Heaps	11,249	35.3	-6.8
Communist	Leslie Tom Morris	5,315	16.7	-8.7
National Government	Percy Ellor	2,255	7.1	
Total valid votes		31,834		

1932 Manitoba General Election: Winnipeg 10 to be elected by Single Transferable Vote
Party	Candidate	First Count	Status
Conservative	William Sanford Evans	13,507	Elected
Independent Labour Party	John Queen	9,302	Elected
Liberal-Progressive	William James Major	5,940	Elected
Independent Labour Party	Seymour Farmer	5,053	Elected
Conservative	John Thomas Haig	4,432	Elected
Liberal	John Stewart McDiarmid	3,540	Elected
Conservative	Huntly Ketchen	3,530	Elected
United Front	Leslie Morris	3,455	Eliminated on the 24th count
Independent Labour Party	Marcus Hyman	3,366	Elected
Liberal	Ralph Maybank	2,945	Elected
Independent Ukrainian	C. Andrusyshen	2,693	Eliminated on the 21st count
Independent Labour Party	William Ivens	2,262	Elected
Conservative	William V. Tobias	1,991	Eliminated on the 20th count
Conservative	R.W.B. Swail	1,951	Eliminated on the 22nd count
Liberal	Edward William Montgomery	1,614	Eliminated on the 19th count
Independent Labour	Jessie MacLennan	1,600	Eliminated on the 17th count
Conservative	James Alexander Barry	1,549	Eliminated on the 24th count
Independent	F.W. Russell	1,339	Eliminated on the 16th count
United Front	Jacob Penner	1,106	Eliminated on the 13th count
Independent Labour Party	V.B. Anderson	1,061	Eliminated on the 15th count
Independent Labour Party	Beatrice Brigden	894	Eliminated on the 11th count
Socialist Party of Manitoba	George Armstrong	848	Eliminated on the 10th count
Liberal	H.P.A. Hermanson	688	Eliminated on the 14th count
Liberal	Duncan Cameron	597	Eliminated on the 8th count
Liberal	John Y. Reid	588	Eliminated on 9th count
Liberal	Clarence G. Keith	548	Eliminated on 7th count
Conservative	D.M. Elcheshen	314	Eliminated on 5th count
Liberal	W.J. Fulton	182	Eliminated on 4th count
Independent	Thomas Gargan	82	Eliminated on 4th count
