= Tim Buck =

Canadian communist leader (1891–1973)

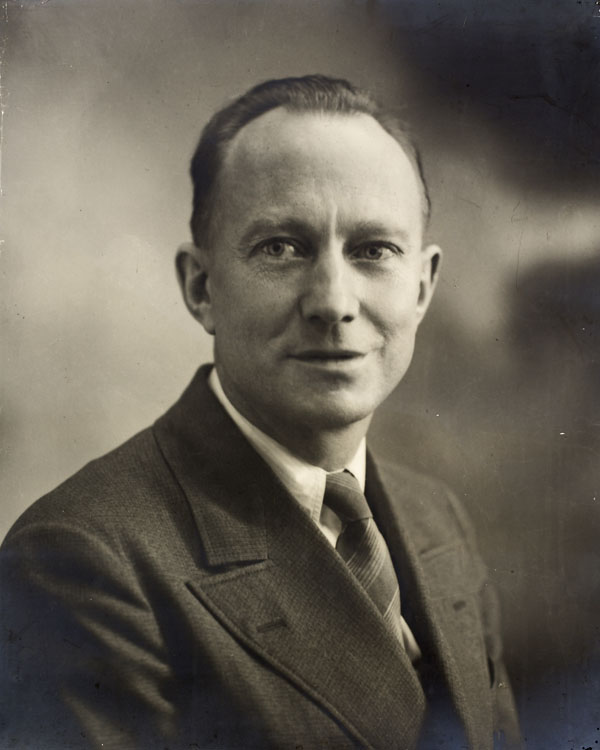

Chairman of the Communist Party of Canada
- In office 1962–1973
- Preceded by: Bill Kardash
- Succeeded by: Position abolished

General Secretary of the Communist Party of Canada
- In office 1929–1962
- Preceded by: Jack MacDonald
- Succeeded by: Leslie Morris

Personal details
- Born: Timothy Buck; January 6, 1891 Beccles, Suffolk, England
- Died: March 11, 1973 (aged 82) Cuernavaca, Mexico
- Party: Communist Party of Canada
- Other political affiliations: Labor-Progressive Party (1943–1959)
- Occupation: Politician
- Awards: Order of the October Revolution

Timothy Buck (January 6, 1891 – March 11, 1973) was the general secretary of the Communist Party of Canada (known as the Labor-Progressive Party from 1943 to 1959) from 1929 until 1962. Together with Ernst Thälmann of Germany, Maurice Thorez of France, Palmiro Togliatti of Italy, Earl Browder of the United States, and Harry Pollitt of Great Britain, Buck was one of the top leaders of the Joseph Stalin-era Communist International.

== Early life and career ==
A machinist by trade, Buck was born in Beccles, England, and emigrated to Canada in 1910 reputedly because it was cheaper to book steamship passage to Canada than to Australia. He became involved in the labour movement and joined the International Association of Machinists and radical working-class politics in Toronto. He claimed to have been present at the founding convention of the Communist Party of Canada, though this is disputed. Not initially a leading member of the party, Buck came to prominence as a supporter of Joseph Stalin, and became General Secretary in 1929, after the old party leadership had been purged for supporting Leon Trotsky, and others removed for supporting Bukharin. Buck remained General Secretary until 1962 and was a committed supporter of the Soviet line throughout his tenure.

== National figure ==
The Worker headline reporting on murder attempt on Buck

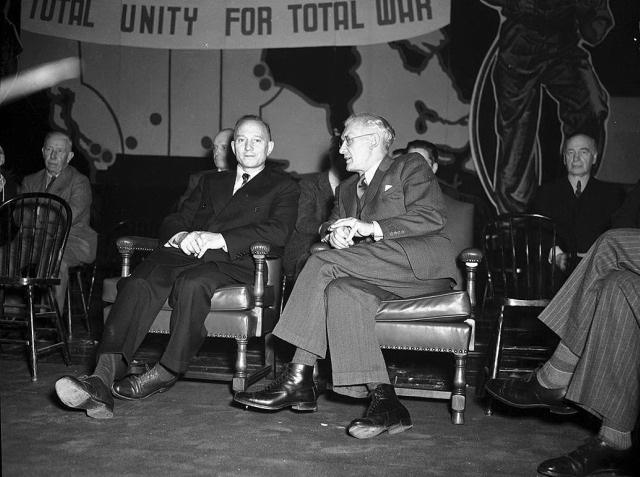
Tim Buck (left) and others, Dominion Communist – Labor Total War Committee meeting, Maple Leaf Gardens, October 13, 1942

In 1928, Buck was expelled from the International Association of Machinists for being a member of the Communist Party of Canada. With the onset of the Great Depression, the Conservative government of R. B. Bennett became increasingly worried about left-wing activity and agitation. On August 11, 1931, the Communist Party offices in Toronto were raided, and Buck and several of his colleagues were arrested and charged with sedition. Buck was tried in November, convicted of sedition and sentenced to hard labour.

He was imprisoned from 1932 to 1934 in Kingston Penitentiary where he was the target of an apparent assassination attempt in his cell the night after a prison riot. While Buck was sitting in his cell listening to the mêlée outside, eight shots were fired into his cell via a window, narrowly missing the prisoner. In late 1933, Minister of Justice Hugh Guthrie admitted in the House of Commons of Canada that shots had been deliberately fired into Buck's cell but "just to frighten him." A widespread civil rights campaign ultimately secured Buck's release. His extensive testimony before the Archambault Commission contributed to the reform of prisons in Canada. As a result, Buck was hailed a heroic champion of civil liberties.

The Communist Party was banned in 1941 under the Defence of Canada Regulations. Buck and other prominent communist leaders were forced underground and ultimately into exile in the United States because of their support for the pact between Germany and the Soviet Union, both of which invaded Poland at the start of the Second World War. Like supporters and immigrants from the Axis powers, communists were suspected of collusion with Germany, and all who suspected of strongly supporting the alliance were interned under the War Measures Act. The political environment began to change only after Germany invaded the Soviet Union. The Soviet Union's entry into World War II on the side of the Allies caused Canadian communists to end their opposition to the war and apparently to become enthusiastic supporters of the Canadian war effort. The party supported the government's call for conscription and established Tim Buck Plebiscite Committees, which called for a "Yes" vote in the 1942 national plebiscite on conscription. The campaigning in support of the war helped change public opinion towards the communists and resulted in the government's release of communist leaders being held in detention and the return of Buck and other leaders from exile. The ban on the party itself was not lifted, but it was allowed to organize the Labor-Progressive Party as its legal public face.

== Electoral politics ==
Buck ran for a seat in the House of Commons on five occasions and once for the Toronto city Board of Control, all unsuccessfully.

in the 1935 federal election, he ran in Winnipeg North and won 25% of the vote, placing third. He lost to Cooperative Commonwealth Federation (CCF) candidate Abraham Albert Heaps.

In the 1937 Toronto municipal election he came within 200 votes of winning a citywide election to the Toronto Board of Control.

He won 26% of the vote when he ran in the Toronto riding of Trinity in the 1945 election, and 21% in the 1949 election, finishing ahead of the CCF on both occasions.

In the 1953 election, he won only 8.7% of the vote and then just 3.7% of the vote when he stood one last time in the 1958 election.

== Retirement and death ==
Buck retired as general secretary of the Communist Party of Canada in 1962 but remained in the largely ceremonial position of party chairman until his death in 1973. There was controversy within the party when a posthumous version of his memoirs was published in 1977 by NC Press based on interviews conducted for the CBC in 1965. In Yours in the Struggle: Reminiscences of Tim Buck, the former party leader criticized Nikita Khrushchev and was somewhat defensive of Stalin, although not departing from the international Communist movement's current perspective.

The main concerns of the party's Central Executive Committee (CEC) were that the publishers were trying to frame Buck in a pro-Maoist manner in regard to the Sino-Soviet Split where the party had sided with the Soviet Union, and that the transcripts of the taped interviews were liable to be misinterpreted in this manner. Those within the CEC responsible for its publication were punished for "grave violation of democratic centralism". Earlier in 1975, Progress Books published Tim Buck — A Conscience for Canada by Oscar Ryan, which is considered to be the party-approved biography. In it, Buck was quoted as saying "for a time I gave the appearance of defending Stalin. I didn't defend what he had done; the fact is, nobody could defend the things that Khrushchev revealed."

Canadian Ecosocialist Ian Angus also criticized Yours in Struggle, asserting that the autobiography "is a remarkably incomplete account of Buck's life" in which many critical events are omitted entirely while others are thoroughly falsified. He praised the book's editors for publishing "an important historical document ... in defiance of an attempt to suppress it" but described the book as "virtually unedited" and wrote that the editors "did not ... take their editorial responsibility seriously." He continued this criticism with his 1981 book Canadian Bolsheviks: The Early Years of the Communist Party of Canada, which analyzed the formation and rise of the party, but felt that Tim Buck had betrayed it by promoting himself and a strongly pro-Soviet line.

Buck died in Cuernavaca, Mexico, on March 11, 1973, at age 82.

== Electoral record ==
1953 Canadian federal election: Trinity
Party	Candidate	Votes	%	±%
Liberal	Lionel Conacher	8,056	40.94	+6.04
Progressive Conservative	Stanley Frolick	6,019	30.59	+2.30
Co-operative Commonwealth	Herman A. Voaden	3,877	19.70	+4.51
Labor–Progressive	Tim Buck	1,725	8.77	-12.85
Total valid votes		19,677		

1949 Canadian federal election: Trinity
Party	Candidate	Votes	%	±%
Liberal	Lionel Conacher	10,389	34.90	+4.11
Progressive Conservative	Larry Skey	8,423	28.29	-2.82
Labor–Progressive	Tim Buck	6,438	21.62	-4.53
Co-operative Commonwealth	Herman A. Voaden	4,522	15.19	+3.23
Total valid votes		29,772		

1945 Canadian federal election: Trinity
Party	Candidate	Votes	%	±%
Progressive Conservative	Larry Skey	8,908	31.11	-23.22
Liberal	Ernest Charlton Bogart	8,817	30.79	-11.32
Labor–Progressive	Tim Buck	7,488	26.15	–
Co-operative Commonwealth	Herman A. Voaden	3,425	11.96	–
Total valid votes		28,638		

1937 Toronto Board of Control Election 4 to be elected	Vote
Frederick J. Conboy (X)	60,665
William J. Wadsworth (X)	53,766
Fred Hamilton (X)	47,493
Douglas McNish	44,402
Tim Buck	44,248
Robert Hood Saunders	41,817
Robert Allen	15,283
Harry Bradley	4,623

1935 Canadian federal election: Winnipeg North
Party	Candidate	Votes	%	±%
Co-operative Commonwealth	Abraham Albert Heaps	12,093	42.16	-6.88
Liberal	C.S. Booth	8,412	29.32	+13.95
Communist	Tim Buck	7,276	25.36	–
Social Credit	Fred John Welwood	905	3.15	–
Total valid votes		28,686		

== See also ==
- Eight Men Speak (1933), a Canadian play about the imprisonment of eight Communist Party of Canada members, including Tim Buck
