= Sam Walsh (politician) =

Canadian politician (1916–2008)

General Secretary of the Communist Party of Quebec
- In office 1965–1989
- Preceded by: Office established
- Succeeded by: Marianne Roy

Personal details
- Born: Saul Jerome Wolofsky; August 31, 1916 Montreal, Quebec
- Died: March 18, 2008 (aged 91)
- Party: Communist Party of Quebec
- Other political affiliations: Communist Party of Canada; Labor-Progressive Party; Communist Party of Ontario
- Parent: Hirsch Wolofsky (father)
- Education: McGill University
- Occupation: Politician

Military service
- Allegiance: Canada
- Branch/service: Canadian Army
- Rank: Second Lieutenant
- Battles/wars: World War 2

Samuel Walsh (August 31, 1916 – March 18, 2008) was leader of the Communist Party of Quebec for 28 years, from 1962 to 1990, and was a leader in the Communist Party of Canada and Labor-Progressive Party since the 1940s.

== Early life and education ==
Walsh was born in Montreal as Saul Jerome Wolofsky. His father was Hirsch Wolofsky, publisher of the Keneder Adler (Canadian Eagle), Canada's first Yiddish newspaper.

At the age of 17, Wolofsky took part in a student strike against an increase in high school tuition fees. He became a Communist with the encouragement of his older brother, Moishe, a union organizer. His father asked them to change their names to avoid embarrassing the family and so Moishe became Bill Walsh and Saul became Sam Walsh.

Walsh enrolled in biology at McGill University and obtained a Bachelor of Science degree in 1938. He moved to Toronto.

== Career ==
Walsh ran for public office at least 30 times in his career, and was elected twice as a school trustee in Toronto in the late 1940s.

When the Communist Party was banned in 1940, Walsh went underground and evaded arrest under the wartime Defence of Canada Regulations. Once the Nazis invaded the Soviet Union, the USSR became Canada's ally and Communists were able to organize the new Labor-Progressive Party as a legal front.

Walsh enlisted in the Canadian Army during World War II, becoming a second lieutenant instructing soldiers how to operate military vehicles. He was denied further promotion because of his political affiliations. According to his niece, "His commanding officer told him, 'Sam, I'd like to promote you, but I understand you're pink.'" Walsh replied “I'm not pink, I'm flaming red.”

Walsh became a permanent party organizer for the Labor-Progressive Party following Fred Rose's election victory in 1943.

In 1948, Walsh was elected to the Toronto Board of Education by acclamation and was re-elected in 1949 before being defeated in 1950.

Walsh ran in the 1958 federal election in Spadina and then in a by-election in Trinity, both Toronto ridings, but was unsuccessful.

He returned to Montreal in the 1960s becoming leader of the Communist Party of Quebec in 1962. In 1972, he denounced Trotskyist support for Quebec independence resulting in a number of defections from the party.

== Electoral record ==
1988 Canadian federal election: Saint-Denis
Party	Candidate	Votes
Liberal	Marcel Prud'homme	19,928
Progressive Conservative	Madeleine Provost	12,843
New Democratic	Jaime Llambias-Wolff	6,151
Rhinoceros	Chérubin Guy Roy	1,166
Green	René E. Pratte	1,107
Independent	Panagiotis Macrisopoulos	341
Social Credit	Doris Lacroix	269
Communist	Sam Walsh	204
Commonwealth of Canada	Nancy Duchaine	191

1985 Quebec general election: Laurier
Party	Candidate	Votes	%
Liberal	Christos Sirros	16,004	65.80
Parti Québécois	Ivano Vellano	5,966	24.47
New Democratic	Ioannis Kourtesis	830	3.41
Parti indépendantiste	Christian Biron	425	1.74
Progressive Conservative	Irene Makris	393	1.61
Humanist	Gustavo Jara	232	0.95
Independent	Christopher Mcall	174	0.71
Communist	Sam Walsh	172	0.71
Commonwealth of Canada	Benoit Chalifoux	146	0.60
Total valid votes		24,382	97.86
Rejected and declined votes		533	2.14
Turnout		24,915	68.86
Electors on the lists		36,128	
Source: Official Results, Le Directeur général des élections du Québec.

1984 Canadian federal election: Saint Denis
Party	Candidate	Votes
Liberal	Marcel Prud'homme	18,750
Progressive Conservative	Peter Georgakakos	12,122
New Democratic	Scott McKay	4,581
Rhinoceros	Ben Rhino 97 Michel Benoit	1,588
Parti nationaliste	Clovis Gaudet	981
Independent	Claude Lamoureux	297
Communist	Sam Walsh	266
Commonwealth of Canada	Serge Buchet	125

1980 Canadian federal election: Saint-Denis
Party	Candidate	Votes
Liberal	Marcel Prud'homme	28,383
New Democratic	Raymond Beaudoin	3,485
Progressive Conservative	David M. Bernstein	2,312
Rhinoceros	Serge Rose	1,232
Social Credit	Richer Francœur	743
Marxist–Leninist	Panagiotis Macrysopoulos	182
Communist	Sam Walsh	165
Union populaire	Gilles Maillé	161

1979 Canadian federal election: Saint-Denis
Party	Candidate	Votes
Liberal	Marcel Prud'homme	30,552
Progressive Conservative	David Bernstein	3,380
Social Credit	Richer M. Francœur	3,177
New Democratic	Richard Marcille	2,412
Rhinoceros	Rodrigue Chocolat Tremblay	1,056
Marxist–Leninist	Panagiotis Macrisopoulos	238
Union populaire	Diane Martin Lelièvre	226
Communist	Sam Walsh	187

1976 Quebec general election: Maisonneuve
Party	Candidate	Votes
Parti Québécois	Robert Burns	15,390
Liberal	Gilles Houle	6,316
Union Nationale	Arthur Goyette	2,040
Ralliement créditiste	Michel Parret	652
Parti national populaire	Jean-Guy Forget	220
Socialist Democracy	Louis Cauchy	58
Communist	Sam Walsh	33
Parti des travailleurs du Québec	Jeannine Warren	32
Independent	André Frappier	22
Total valid votes		15,330

1974 Canadian federal election: Saint-Denis
Party	Candidate	Votes
Liberal	Marcel Prud'homme	15,310
Progressive Conservative	David M. Bernstein	4,897
New Democratic	Jean-Guy Albert	1,963
Social Credit	Tony Chatoyan	1,630
Marxist–Leninist	Polyvios Tsakanikas	208
Communist	Samuel J. Walsh	162

1966 Quebec general election: Saint-Louis
Party	Candidate	Votes	%
Liberal	Harry Blank	8,960	58.45
Union Nationale	Nathan Shore	4,044	26.38
RIN	Guy Viel	1,646	10.74
Ralliement national	Lucien Plante	453	2.95
Communist	Sam Walsh	227	1.48
Total valid votes		15,330	

1962 Canadian federal election: Hochelaga
Party	Candidate	Votes	%	±%
Liberal	Raymond Eudes	13,220	50.45	-2.21
Progressive Conservative	Yvon Groulx	7,784	29.70	-10.78
New Democratic	Noël Langlois	2,475	9.44	+5.37
Social Credit	Robert Leblanc	2,379	9.08	
Communist	Sam Walsh	347	1.32	-1.46
Total valid votes		26,205		

1959 Ontario general election: York South
Party	Candidate	Votes	%	±%
Co-operative Commonwealth	Donald C. MacDonald	14,446	46.95	+2.52
Progressive Conservative	Alice Bickerton	9,133	29.68	-9.57
Liberal	Fred McDermott	5,508	17.90	+4.81
Independent Conservative	C.J. Garfunkel	1,228	3.99	–
Labor–Progressive	Sam Walsh	454	1.48	-1.75
Total valid votes		30,769		

Canadian federal by-election, December 15, 1958: Trinity Death of Edward R. Lockyer
Party	Candidate	Votes	%	±%
Liberal	Paul Hellyer	5,175	43.89	+7.39
Progressive Conservative	Joe Lesniak	4,404	37.35	-8.20
Co-operative Commonwealth	John Elchuk	1,724	14.62	+0.47
Labor–Progressive	Sam Walsh	488	4.14	+0.34
Total valid votes		11,791		

1958 Canadian federal election: Spadina
Party	Candidate	Votes	%	±%
Progressive Conservative	Charles E. Rea	14,616	50.16	+7.06
Liberal	Philip Givens	10,596	36.37	-3.19
Co-operative Commonwealth	Jack Kedzierzykowski	3,040	10.43	-2.20
Labor–Progressive	Sam Walsh	652	2.24	-0.54
Social Credit	Dorothy Cureatz	233	0.80	-1.13
Total valid votes		29,137		

1945 Ontario general election: St. Patrick
Party	Candidate	Votes	%	±%
Progressive Conservative	Kelso Roberts	7,243	50.49	+5.99
Co-operative Commonwealth	John Osler	2,854	19.90	-7.69
Liberal	J.M. Gould	2,846	19.90	-8.01
Labor–Progressive	Sam Walsh	1,401	9.77	–
Total valid votes		14,344		
