= Dan Heap =

Canadian politician and Anglican priest (1925–2014)

The Reverend Dan Heap

Member of Parliament for Trinity—Spadina
- In office 1988–1993
- Preceded by: Riding established
- Succeeded by: Tony Ianno

Member of Parliament for Spadina
- In office 1981–1988
- Preceded by: Peter Stollery
- Succeeded by: Riding abolished

Alderman, Toronto City Council
- In office 1972–1981
- Preceded by: Horace Brown
- Succeeded by: John Sewell

Metropolitan Toronto Councillor
- In office 1974–1978
- Preceded by: William Archer
- Succeeded by: Allan Sparrow

Personal details
- Born: Daniel James Macdonnell Heap; September 24, 1925 Winnipeg, Manitoba, Canada
- Died: April 25, 2014 (aged 88) Toronto, Ontario, Canada
- Party: New Democratic Party; Co-operative Commonwealth Federation
- Spouse: Alice Boomhour (m. 1950; died 2012)
- Education: Queen's University; McGill University

Ecclesiastical career
- Religion: Christianity (Anglican)
- Church: Anglican Church of Canada
- Ordained: 1950 (priest)
- Congregations: Church of the Holy Trinity, Toronto

Daniel James Macdonnell Heap (September 24, 1925 – April 25, 2014) was a Canadian activist and politician. Heap served as a Member of Parliament with the New Democratic Party, a Toronto City Councillor, a political activist and an Anglican worker-priest. He represented the Toronto, Ontario, riding of Spadina (after 1988 Trinity—Spadina) from 1981 to 1993 and Ward 6 on Toronto City Council from 1972 to 1981. As an activist he was involved in the peace movement, community issues around housing, homelessness, poverty and refugee rights among other social justice issues.

== Background ==
Heap was born on September 24, 1925, in Winnipeg, Manitoba, into a middle-class family, the second of four children. His father, Fred Heap, was a lawyer and his mother was a piano teacher. Heap's maternal grandfather was a Presbyterian minister inspiring Heap, from a young age, to want to take up the same calling.

Heap was raised a Presbyterian in a family that was concerned about social causes. When he was 6, the family decided to boycott Japanese oranges to protest the Japanese invasion of Manchuria.

For his last two years of high school, Heap attended Upper Canada College on a scholarship, and then studied classics and philosophy at Queen's University.

A pacifist, Heap nevertheless joined the Canadian Army during the Second World War due to his opposition to Nazism, later saying "It wasn't possible to be neutral in the face of Hitler". However, the war ended before he could be sent overseas.

In 1945, while working in a factory as a summer job, he met members of the Student Christian Movement (SCM) and became a Christian socialist. He later also became a member of the Society of the Catholic Commonwealth and of the Co-operative Commonwealth Federation (CCF), forerunner of the New Democratic Party (NDP).

Heap studied theology at the University of Chicago for a year before becoming an Anglican and transferring to McGill University to pursue a divinity degree. While at McGill he became engaged to Alice Boomhour, a pacifist, activist in the SCM and CCF, and daughter of a United Church minister. They married in 1950. That same year, he was ordained a priest within the Anglican Church of Canada.

After working as a parish priest in Quebec for only a few years in the 1950s, Heap decided against a career as a church employee and aligned himself with the Worker-Priest movement which paired ministry with social activism. Heap moved his family to Toronto where he worked for 18 years as a labourer (cutter trimmer, later pressman) in a cardboard box factory in Toronto, where he became involved in the paperworker's union (later the Communications, Energy and Paperworkers Union of Canada which eventually merged to become part of Unifor) and was elected a union representative and attempted to "bring socialism to the Canadian worker".

He and Alice raised seven children, including son Danny Heap, a computer science lecturer at the University of Toronto.

In 1965, Heap marched with Martin Luther King Jr. on his Selma to Montgomery marches while the rest of his family participated in a solidarity sit-in in Toronto. The family also opened their home to Americans resisting the Vietnam War, youth involved with the SCM and other activists.

== Politics ==
Heap entered politics and campaigned on a platform to oppose poverty, war and homelessness. He ran as the New Democratic Party's candidate in Spadina in the 1968 federal election placing second in a campaign where he described himself as a "worker priest". He also ran in the 1971 provincial election against Allan Grossman in the riding of St. Andrew—St. Patrick, losing by 1137 votes. His first success in politics came when he was elected in the 1972 municipal election as the junior Alderman for Ward 6. As well as serving on Toronto City Council from 1972 to 1981, he also represented Ward 6 on Metro Toronto Council from 1974 to 1978. When the Liberal Member of Parliament for Spadina, Peter Stollery, was appointed to the Senate in 1981, Heap decided to run in the subsequent by-election. Prime Minister Pierre Trudeau had recommended Stollery for appointment to the Senate in order to open the "safe Liberal riding" for Trudeau's aide Jim Coutts. Heap defeated Coutts in the by-election, however, and was re-elected in the 1984 and 1988 elections. He retired at the 1993 federal election.

Heap was an outspoken MP, and campaigned against poverty, homelessness, and war. Upon being elected to parliament, he said his three priorities were world peace, worker control of the economy, and an end to social injustice. He served as NDP critic on immigration, served on the member of the House of Commons Standing Committee on Labour, Employment and Immigration, and was a prominent spokesperson for social justice issues both in Canada and abroad. He was very concerned with issues such as refugees, the situations in Central America, East Timor, and South Africa. Heap hired a young Olivia Chow as his constituency office assistant.

== Later life ==
Despite retiring from politics, Heap remained involved as an activist, strongly backing the anti-war movement, and supporting NDP candidates in the region. He also remained involved at the downtown Church of the Holy Trinity and social justice issues within the Anglican Church of Canada. In retirement, he preferred to go by the name "Don Heap", which he used before entering electoral politics in 1968.

In the late 1980s, he and his wife Alice sold their family home in Toronto's Kensington Market area at a fraction of the market price to the Homes First Society, a community organization which provides housing for refugees. The house had been a nexus for meetings and organizing among student activists around the anti-war, anti-apartheid and social housing movements from the 1960s to the 1980s with as many as a dozen young people staying with the Heap family at one time.

In his late seventies and early eighties he remained involved in various issues such as refugee rights. Heap co-founded the Toronto Disaster Relief Committee to campaign on the issue of homelessness.

Heap suffered a heart attack in 2005 and was also diagnosed with Alzheimer's disease in 2006. In 2011, he and his wife faced eviction from their retirement home as they awaited admission to a long-term care facility, for which they had been on a waiting list for five years. In October 2011, Heap was admitted to the Kensington Gardens facility and his wife Alice got a spot there later that month. Alice Heap, his wife of 61 years, died due to complications from pneumonia on March 24, 2012, at the age of 86.

Heap died on April 25, 2014. One of his sons posted a message remembering him as an "advocate of the homeless, for refugees and for peace [among other causes]" and also as a "Pacifist, socialist, worker-priest, marxist Anglican, trade-unionist, city councillor, member of parliament, civilly disobedient marcher for human rights. Wearer of red shirts, cyclist, paddler of canoes, singer of songs."

== Tributes ==
A sole support mother that Heap helped get childcare in the 1980s, later taught nursing at George Brown College. In 2013, Nadira Fraser established the "Dan and Alice Heap Bursary" to aid single parents to qualify for nursing. The couple also has an athletic award which is attributed to their namesake, the Don & Alice Heap Rugby for All Athletic Award.

== Electoral history ==
=== Spadina ===
1968 Canadian federal election
Party	Candidate	Votes
Liberal	Perry Ryan	9,379
New Democratic	Dan Heap	3,943
Progressive Conservative	Victor Bagnato	3,353

=== St. Andrew—St. Patrick ===
1971 Ontario general election: St. Andrew—St. Patrick
Party	Candidate	Votes	%
Progressive Conservative	Allan Grossman	8,256	45.8
New Democratic	Dan Heap	7,536	41.8
Liberal	Elizabeth Catty	1,645	9.1
Independent	Istvan Kovacs	239	1.3
Communist	Elizabeth Hill	214	1.2
Social Credit	John Bilan	147	0.8
Total		18,037	
Canadian Press (22 October 1971). "Here's who won on the Metro ridings". The Toronto Daily Star. Toronto. p. 12.

=== Toronto City Council (Ward 6) ===
1972

Ward 6 (Financial District, Toronto - University of Toronto)
x-William Archer - 7,395
x-Dan Heap (reform) - 7,153
June Marks (incumbent) - 6,396
Horace Brown (incumbent) - 2,928
Arthur Downes - 2,127

1974

Ward 6 (Financial District, Toronto - University of Toronto)
x-Dan Heap (incumbent)
x-Allan Sparrow
William Archer (incumbent)
K Dock Yip
John Comos
Arthur Downes
Fred Nelson

1976

Ward 6 (Financial District, Toronto - University of Toronto)
x-Dan Heap (incumbent) - 8,503
x-Allan Sparrow (incumbent) - 8,103
Peter Budd - 4,448
Arnold Linelsky - 2,046

1978

Ward 6 (Financial District, Toronto - University of Toronto)
x-Allan Sparrow (incumbent) - 8,029
x-Dan Heap (incumbent) - 7,514
Dan Richards - 6,421
Rose Smith - 2,785
Joe Martin - 1,143

1980

Ward 6 (Financial District, Toronto - University of Toronto)
x-Gordon Chong - 9,522
x-Dan Heap (incumbent) - 9,341
George Hislop - 7,348
Rose Smith - 2,959
Fred Chappell - 1,339
Darryl Randall - 659
Gary Weagle - 505

=== Spadina ===
Canadian federal by-election, August 17, 1981: Spadina Appointment of Peter Stollery to the Senate
Party	Candidate	Votes
New Democratic	Dan Heap	7,586
Liberal	Jim Coutts	7,372
Progressive Conservative	Laura Sabia	6,581
Rhinoceros	Decriminalized Douglas	233
Libertarian	Robert Champlin	162
Independent	Anne McBride	84
Independent	John Turmel	69
Independent	Ronald Rodgers	41

1984 Canadian federal election: Spadina
Party	Candidate	Votes
New Democratic	Dan Heap	13,241
Liberal	Jim Coutts	11,880
Progressive Conservative	Ying Hope	8,061
Libertarian	William E. Burt	358
Rhinoceros	Mara Maria Proussaefs	289
Independent	Sam Guha	98

=== Trinity—Spadina ===
1988 Canadian federal election: Trinity—Spadina
Party	Candidate	Votes	%
New Democratic	Dan Heap	15,565	38.55
Liberal	Tony Ianno	15,082	37.35
Progressive Conservative	Joe Pimentel	8,618	21.34
Libertarian	Paul Barker	494	1.22
Rhinoceros	John Douglas	444	1.10
Independent	Sukhdev S. Grewal	127	0.31
Independent	Charles Shrybman	49	0.12
Total valid votes		40,379	

== Archives ==
There is a Dan Heap fonds at Library and Archives Canada. Archival reference number is R11601.
