= Communist Party of Canada candidates in the 2008 Canadian federal election =

This is list of Communist Party of Canada 2008 federal election candidates by riding and province.

== Alberta ==
- Calgary East - Jason Devine
- Edmonton—Mill Woods—Beaumont - Naomi Rankin

== British Columbia ==
- Burnaby—Douglas - George Gidora
- Kelowna—Lake Country - Mark Haley
- Newton—North Delta - Harjit Daudharia
- Vancouver Kingsway - Kimball Cariou

== Manitoba ==
- Brandon—Souris - Lisa Gallagher
- Winnipeg Centre - Darrell Rankin
- Winnipeg North - Frank Komarniski

== Ontario ==
=== Brampton—Springdale: Dimitrios (Jim) Kabitsis ===
Kabitsis was 76 years old at the time of the election, and was a retired real estate salesman. He joined the Communist Party of Canada in 1962. Kabitsis ran for a seat on the Toronto City Council in 1980, calling for a reduction in the cost of the Toronto Transit Commission's Metropass, a shorter term of the Metro Toronto Chairman, and the recognition of day care as a right. His 2008 election biography also indicates that he has been a municipal candidate in Orillia. He is a member of Fair Vote Canada, a group advocating electoral reform.

Electoral record
Election	Division	Party	Votes	%	Place	Winner
1980 Toronto municipal	Toronto City Council, Ward Five	n/a	912	3.41	5/6	Ying Hope and Ron Kanter
2008 federal	Brampton—Springdale	Communist	135	0.30	5/5	Ruby Dhalla, Liberal

Note: The results from 1980 are taken from the Toronto Star newspaper, 11 November 1980, A12 (146 out of 148 polls reporting).

- Davenport - Miguel Figueroa
- Don Valley West - Cathy Holliday
- Guelph - Drew Garvie
- Kitchener Centre - Martin Suter
- Kitchener—Waterloo - Ramon Portillo
- Ottawa West—Nepean - Alex McDonald
- St. Catharines - Sam Hammond
- Toronto Centre - Johan Boyden
- Windsor West - Elizabeth Rowley

== Quebec ==
- Hochelaga - Marianne Fontaine
- Laurier—Sainte-Marie - Samie Page-Quirion
- Mount Royal - Antonio Artuso
- Westmount—Ville-Marie - Bill Sloan
