= Edward Murphy (Ontario MPP) =

Canadian politician from Ontario

Edward Joseph Murphy

Member of the Ontario Provincial Parliament for St. Patrick
- In office September 30, 1929 – April 3, 1934
- Preceded by: John Allister Currie
- Succeeded by: Frederick Fraser Hunter

Personal details
- Party: Progressive Conservative

Edward Joseph Murphy was a Canadian politician who was Progressive Conservative MPP for St. Patrick from 1929 to 1934.

== See also ==
- 18th Parliament of Ontario
