= John Allister Currie =

Canadian politician

John Allister "Jack" Currie
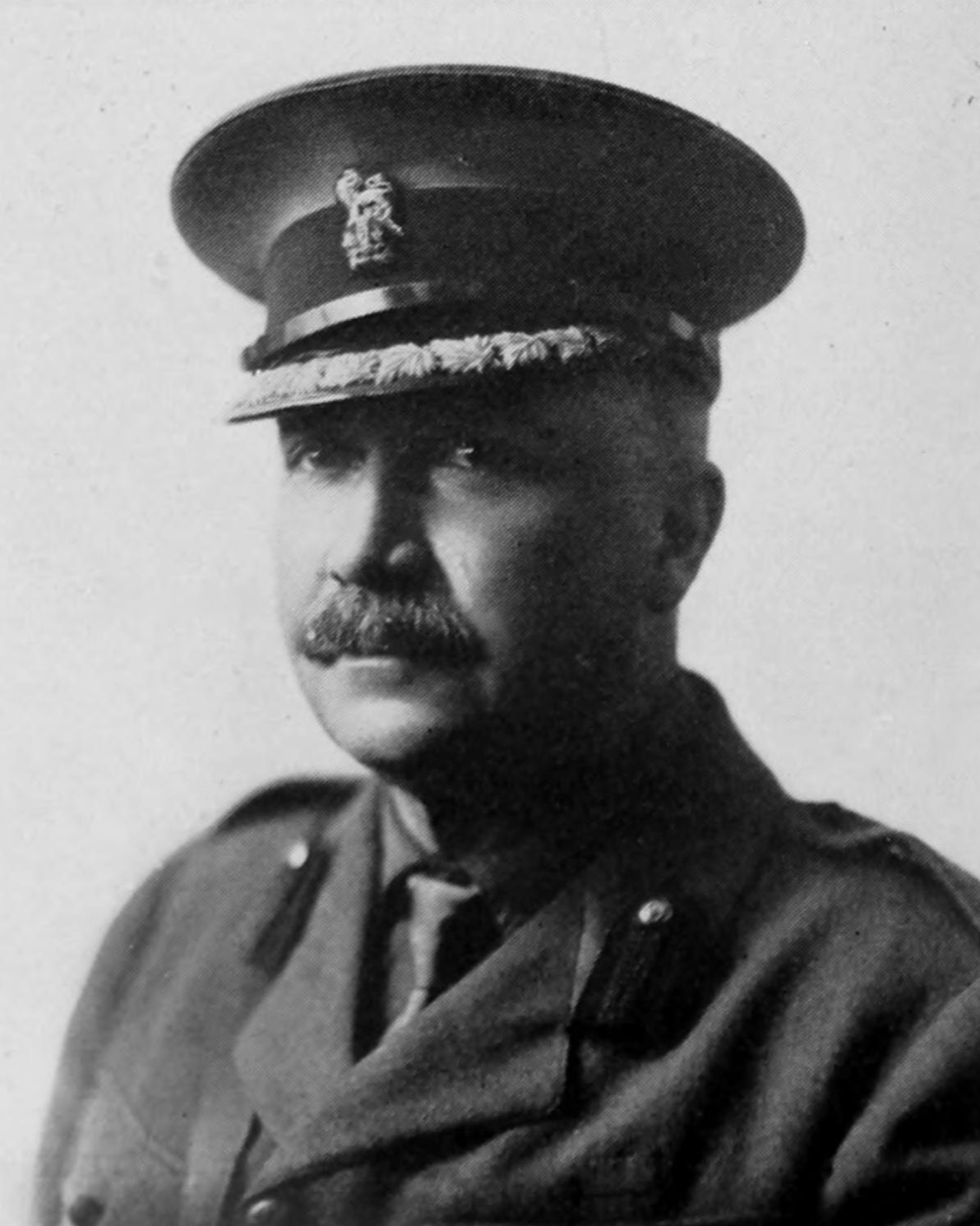

MP for Simcoe North
- In office October 26, 1908 – December 5, 1921
- Preceded by: Leighton McCarthy
- Succeeded by: Thomas Edwin Ross

MPP for Toronto Southeast (Seat A)
- In office October 23, 1922 – October 18, 1926
- Preceded by: John O'Neill
- Succeeded by: Riding abolished

MPP for St. Patrick
- In office December 1, 1926 – September 17, 1929
- Preceded by: New riding
- Succeeded by: Edward Joseph Murphy

Personal details
- Born: February 25, 1868
- Died: June 28, 1931 (aged 63)
- Party: Conservative; Unionist
- Spouse: Helen Sparks

Military service
- Rank: Colonel
- Unit: 48th Highlanders of Canada (1892–1914)
- Commands: 1st Canadian Expeditionary Force, 15th Battalion (1914–1915); Camp Borden, 2nd Brigade (1916–1917)

John Allister Currie (February 25, 1868 – June 28, 1931) was an Ontario author, journalist and political figure.

== Early life ==
He was born in Nottawa, Canada West in 1862, and was educated at Collingwood Collegiate Institute. After an apprenticeship in the hardware trade, he was hired by the Toronto News, and subsequently became a reporter at the Mail and Empire. Around 1900, following a visit to Rossland, British Columbia, he became a mining broker.

== Military service ==
He was one of the four founding captains of the 48th Highlanders of Canada, which served in South Africa during the Second Boer War, and rose to become its commanding officer. At the beginning of World War I, he offered the Canadian Expeditionary Force the entire regiment, and the offer was accepted. Formally referred to as the "15th Battalion", it became known as the "Red Watch". He was in command at Neuve Chapelle, Ypres, and St Julien.

He was transferred back to Canada in August 1915 under cloudy circumstances, in what came to be known as the "dugout incident," where Currie was said to have been found behind the lines instead of being with his men during the first German gas attack at St Julien. He defended his actions in a speech to the House of Commons of Canada in 1916, and wrote about the battle in his book on his war experiences, but the matter arose again years later when Currie was called as a defence witness in the 1928 libel trial concerning Sir Arthur Currie.

He became commander of the 2nd Brigade at Camp Borden during 1916–1917.

== Political career ==
Currie ran unsuccessfully for a seat in the House of Commons in 1904. He won the seat in 1908 and represented Simcoe North in the House as a Conservative and then as a Unionist member.

He defended Canada's single-member constituencies against statements by electoral reformer Ronald Hooper in April 1921.

He was defeated in his bid for reelection in 1921.

Following a by-election win in 1922, he represented Toronto Southeast and then St. Patrick as a Conservative in the Legislative Assembly of Ontario until 1929.

He ran for Mayor of Toronto in the 1924 municipal election placing a poor third.

== Death ==
In 1931, he died at Miami, Florida, following a long illness.
