= Jim Harris (politician) =

Canadian politician

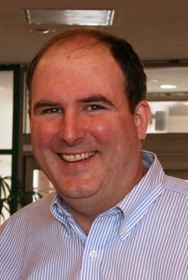
- Harris in 2008

Leader of the Green Party of Canada
- In office 14 February 2003 – 26 August 2006
- Preceded by: Chris Bradshaw
- Succeeded by: Elizabeth May

President of the Green Party of Ontario
- In office 2001–2003

Personal details
- Born: 12 February 1961 (age 65) Toronto, Ontario, Canada
- Party: Green
- Other political affiliations: Ontario Green
- Education: Lakefield College School
- Occupation: Author, management consultant

James R. M. Harris (born 12 February 1961) is a Canadian author, environmentalist, and politician. He was leader of the Green Party of Canada from 2003 to 2006, when he was succeeded by Elizabeth May.

== Early life and Green activism ==
Harris was born in Toronto, attended Lakefield College School, and received a Bachelor of Arts degree in English and History from Queen's University in Kingston in the 1980s. Initially a Progressive Conservative, he was converted to green politics in 1985 after reading Green Politics by Fritjof Capra and Charlene Spretnak, which highlights the rise of the German Greens. Harris worked as the national press officer of the British Green Party in 1987.

He helped organize the Ontario Green Party's campaign in the 1990 provincial election, and was himself a candidate in the Toronto division of St. Andrew—St. Patrick. In this election, he spoke against a provincial government decision to build more nuclear reactors in the province. The Green Party fielded 40 candidates and received 33,000 votes, a significant increase from seven candidates and 3,000 votes in the previous 1987 election. Harris finished fourth in his constituency.

Harris campaigned for Mayor of Toronto in the 1991 municipal election, as an independent candidate supporting green policies. He called for water conservation and a ban on city pesticide spraying, and supported stricter gun control. Considered a fringe candidate, he finished well behind frontrunners June Rowlands and Jack Layton.

In 1993, Harris and other Ontario Greens sought and won a change in the party's constitution allowing for the election of a full-time leader. The party had been nominally led by Katherine Mathewson in the 1990 election, but she held little influence over the campaign or policy. Harris and others argued that electing a full-time leader would allow the Green Party to organize professionally, and present a united message in future elections. Harris stood for the leadership, and lost to Frank de Jong. De Jong later supported Harris in his bid to become federal leader, while Harris endorsed de Jong's bid for re-election as provincial leader in 2001.

Harris was a Toronto organizer for the federal Green Party for the 1993 election, recruiting seventeen candidates in the area. New legislation brought in before the election required a party to run 50 candidate or suffer de-registration and lose its assets. By fielding seventeen candidates in the Toronto region (which then had roughly twenty-two ridings) the Toronto team presented over one-third of the national requirement. Harris stood for election in St. Paul's, and finished sixth.

Harris campaigned for leader of the Green Party of Canada in 1997, and finished second against Joan Russow. He was elected as the first president of the Green Party of Ontario in 2001, and served in that capacity until moving to the federal arena in 2003.

== Author and speaker ==
Harris has written six books, two of which have been national best-sellers in Canada. He also delivers speeches on change and leadership in the corporate sector, and was forced to miss at least one campaign appearance in 2004 to fulfill a prior speaking engagement. Association Magazine has ranked him as one of Canada's top speakers. He spoke at about fifty international conferences a year before becoming GPC leader, and conducts strategic planning sessions with executive teams on leadership, change, CRM, eLearning, innovation and creating learning organizations.

His second book, The Learning Paradox, was nominated for the National Business Book Award in Canada and appeared on several bestseller lists. In this work, Harris argues that Canadians should embrace new learning to gain usable skills for a business community grounded in rapid technological change. Books for Business ranked it as one of the top-10 business books in North America. Harris co-authored the second edition of The 100 Best Companies to Work for in Canada, which sold over 50,000 copies in Canada. A more recent book, Blindsided!, has been published in over 80 countries.

== National leader ==
=== 2004 campaign ===
Harris was elected leader of the Green Party of Canada on 14 February 2003, defeating Jason Crummey and John Grogan with over 81% of the votes cast by delegates. He replaced interim leader Chris Bradshaw, who led the party from 2001 to 2003. In his campaign for the leadership, Harris asked the membership to elect his preferred slate of council candidates. Other than leadership contestants, council candidates were not given the membership list to use in their campaign despite the green party constitution clearly offering them that right.

Harris attempted to shift the GPC away from an exclusively environmentalist message, and often described the party's ideology as socially progressive and fiscally conservative and as the only party committed to sustainability. He has rejected the argument that voting for the Greens will elect Conservative candidates through vote-splitting, arguing that his party takes support from across the traditional political spectrum.

The party conducted a high-profile campaign in the 2004 election under Harris's leadership, running candidates in all federal ridings for the first time in its history. The 2004 GPC platform, produced by wiki technology called LivingPlatform. As such the GPC was the first party worldwide to use a wiki—and an open process—to develop its platform. More than 60,000 people participated in the final selection of platform planks.

The Living Platform emphasized full cost accounting, the "triple bottom line" (social, financial, environmental) and the green tax shift. The party's fiscal policy proposed taxing polluting activities and non-renewable resources more and incomes less on a revenue-neutral basis. The plan also proposed selective tax cuts on corporate income, which alienated some left-of-centre Greens.

Despite their increased profile, Greens were not invited to the leadership debates. Harris complained of a double standard, as the Bloc Québécois had been included despite not fielding candidates in all ridings. The CRTC defended the right of the broadcasters' consortium to decide on participants and refused to overturn the party's exclusion.

On the eve of the 2004 election, Harris argued that as the NDP won nine seats with 6.9% of the vote in 1993, if the Greens would elect MPs if they could match or surpass that threshold. The party received 582,247 votes (4.3%), but failed to elect any candidates. Harris campaigned in Toronto—Danforth and finished fourth against New Democratic Party leader Jack Layton with 2,575 votes (5.4%) – 400 votes behind the Conservative candidate.

=== Criticism and 2004 leadership challenge ===
Harris's leadership of the Green Party was controversial. He described himself as an ecological conservative and eco-capitalist, and attempted to shift the party to the right on some issues. Some party members criticized Harris in August 2004 for hiring David Scrymgeour, a former national director of the Progressive Conservative Party of Canada and aide to Jim Flaherty, as an advisor. His opponents also accused him of shifting too much authority to the party leadership, while reducing the power of local associations.

Following the 2004 election, Harris was challenged for the leadership by Tom Manley, a prominent party activist from eastern Ontario. Manley argued that Harris was shifting the GPC too far to the right, and was abandoning the party's traditional emphasis on local production in favour of greater accommodation with corporate interests. Harris won re-election as GPC leader in August 2004 on the first ballot count, though by a narrower margin than before. Manley was later appointed deputy leader, but left the GPC in 2005 to join the Liberals.

A number of prominent Greens tendered their resignations during Harris's tenure as leader, with many accusing him of mismanaging the party.

Late in 2005, columnist Murray Dobbin wrote two articles accusing Harris of betraying the Green Party's progressive principles and using authoritarian methods to consolidate power. The second article, published in December 2005, noted that four of the party's eleven officers either resigned in protest or were suspended in the previous year, while a number of key positions were allowed to remain vacant. Dobbin also asserted that Harris's opponents believe he was responsible for undermining the "Living Platform", ignoring fundraising and policy development, and reducing party democracy.

Harris's supporters accused Dobbin of conducting a partisan smear campaign and of ignoring Harris's environmental credentials. Bill Hulet also defended Harris's efforts to reform the party structure, describing the existing system as an "absolute nightmare" because of consensus policy requirements that give small minorities the right to override majority decisions. Harris has defended his record as party leader, noting that membership increased significantly during his tenure rising from approximately 700 members in the summer of 2003 to over 10,000 on the eve of the 2006 Leadership Convention.

=== 2006 campaign ===
As in 2004, Harris unsuccessfully called for the Green Party to be included in the televised leadership debates for the 2006 election. Three days before the election, he predicted that his party would win one million votes. The Greens increased their total to 665,940 votes (4.5%), but again failed to elect any candidates. Harris was a candidate in Beaches—East York, and finished fourth against Liberal incumbent Maria Minna.

The GPC's internal divisions were exposed during the election when former assistant national organizer Matthew Pollesel, who left the Green Party following a contract dispute, accused Harris of mismanaging the party's finances. Pollesel charged that money had been spent without proper reporting, and called for Elections Canada to investigate possible wrongdoing. In addition, Dana Miller, a former party candidate who was not permitted to run in 2006, later called on Elections Canada to investigate Harris's expenses from the 2004 leadership contest. Harris described the accusation as "false, groundless and scurrilous", and the party threatened a libel lawsuit in each case, though no suits were actually filed. On 24 April 2006, Jim Harris announced that he would not stand for re-election as party leader at the Green Party of Canada's August 2006 National Convention. On 26 August 2006, he was succeeded as leader by long-time environmental activist and former Sierra Club of Canada Executive Director Elizabeth May.

== Post-leadership ==
Harris has remained active in the Green Party, maintaining blogs on the websites of both the federal Green Party and the Ontario Green Party. He continues to actively campaign for Green candidates. His Twitter profile is currently promoting Bernie Sanders.

== Electoral record ==
=== Federal elections ===
2006 Canadian federal election: Beaches—East York
Party	Candidate	Votes	%	±%	Expenditures
Liberal	Maria Minna	20,678	40.39	-7.54	$73,454.03
New Democratic	Marilyn Churley	17,900	34.96	+2.67	$74,996.37
Conservative	Peter Conroy	9,238	18.04	+3.98	$74,667.09
Green	Jim Harris	3,106	6.07	+1.53	$9,644.25
Progressive Canadian	Jim Love	183	0.36		$244.26
Marxist–Leninist	Roger Carter	91	0.18	+0.08	
Total valid votes		51,196	99.67		
Total rejected ballots		168	0.33	-0.11	
Turnout		51,364	70.51	+6.49	
Eligible voters		72,844			
Liberal hold		Swing		-5.10	
Sources: Official Results, Elections Canada and Financial Returns, Elections Canada.

2004 Canadian federal election: Toronto—Danforth
Party	Candidate	Votes	%	Expenditures
New Democratic	Jack Layton	22,198	46.34	$72,101.01
Liberal	Dennis Mills	19,803	41.34	$73,909.41
Conservative	Loftus Cuddy	2,975	6.21	$12,400.00
Green	Jim Harris	2,575	5.38	$11,139.51
Marijuana	Scott Yee	265	0.55	$0.00
Marxist–Leninist	Marcell Rodden	84	0.18	$0.00
Total valid votes		47,900	100.00	
Total rejected, unmarked and declined ballots		269		
Turnout		48,169	64.10	
Electors on the lists		75,151		
Percentage change figures are factored for redistribution. Conservative Party percentages are contrasted with the combined Canadian Alliance and Progressive Conservative percentages from 2000.
Sources: Official Results, Elections Canada and Financial Returns, Elections Canada.

1997 Canadian federal election: Toronto Centre—Rosedale
Party	Candidate	Votes	%	Expenditures
Liberal	Bill Graham	22,945	49.19	$48,649
New Democratic	David MacDonald	9,597	20.58	$44,147
Progressive Conservative	Stephen Probyn	8,993	19.28	$54,733
Reform	John Stewart	3,646	7.82	$21,213
Green	Jim Harris	577	1.24	$0
Canadian Action	Anthony Robert Pedrette	303	0.65	$767
Natural Law	Ron Parker	270	0.58	$0
Marxist–Leninist	Stephen Rutchinski	166	0.36	$0
Forward Canada	Ted W. Kulp	145	0.31	$435
Total valid votes		46,642	100.00	
Total rejected, unmarked and declined ballots		423		
Turnout		47,065	67.01	
Electors on the lists		70,234		
Sources: Official Results, Elections Canada and Financial Returns, Elections Canada.

1993 Canadian federal election: St. Paul's (electoral district)
Party	Candidate	Votes	%	±%
Liberal	Barry Campbell	27,878	54.4	+13.6
Progressive Conservative	Isabel Bassett	12,500	24.4	-23.1
Reform	Paul Chaplin	5,707	11.1	
New Democratic	David Jacobs	2,629	5.1	-4.9
National	Mario Godlewski	1,253	2.4	
Green	Jim Harris	491	1.0	+0.3
Natural Law	Rick C. Weberg	314	0.6	
Independent	Jim Conrad	262	0.5	
Libertarian	Rick Stenhouse	107	0.2	-0.4
Marxist–Leninist	David Gershuny	87	0.2	
Abolitionist	Marion Velma Joyce	19	0.0	
Commonwealth of Canada	Mike Twose	10	0.0	
Total valid votes		51,257	100.0	

=== Provincial elections ===
1990 Ontario general election: St. Andrew—St. Patrick
Party	Candidate	Votes	%	±%
New Democratic	Zanana Akande	10,321	34.45	+16.37
Progressive Conservative	Nancy Jackman	9,241	30.85	–2.96
Liberal	Ron Kanter	8,938	29.84	–15.82
Green	Jim Harris	1,112	3.71	–
Libertarian	Douglas Quinn	344	1.15	–1.31
Total valid votes		29,956	98.76	
Total rejected, unmarked and declined ballots		377	1.24	+0.61
Turnout		30,333	66.89	+2.51
Eligible voters		45,347		
New Democratic gain from Liberal		Swing		+16.10
Source: Elections Ontario

The federal and provincial electoral information is taken from Elections Canada and Elections Ontario. Italicized expenditures from elections after 1997 refer to submitted totals, and are presented when the final reviewed totals are not available. Expenditures from 1997 refer to submitted totals.

=== Municipal elections ===
1991 Toronto municipal election: Mayor of Toronto
Candidate	Votes	%
June Rowlands	113,993	58.53
Jack Layton	64,044	32.88
Susan Fish	8,123	4.17
Don Andrews	1,968	1.01
Jim Harris	1,760	0.90
Ken Campbell	1,708	0.88
Joe Young	1,196	0.61
William McKeown	1,023	0.53
Ben Kerr	952	0.49
Total valid votes	194,767	100.00

The above results are taken from the Toronto Star newspaper, November 14, 1991, E8.
