= St. Andrew—St. Patrick =

Former provincial electoral district in Ontario, Canada

Coordinates: 43.65°N 79.39°W

Ontario electoral district

Defunct provincial electoral district
- Legislature: Legislative Assembly of Ontario
- District created: 1966
- District abolished: 1996
- First contested: 1967
- Last contested: 1995

St. Andrew—St. Patrick was a provincial electoral district in Ontario, Canada, that returned Members of Provincial Parliament (MPPs) to the Legislative Assembly of Ontario at Queen's Park.

The riding was created before the 1967 election when the former electoral districts of St. Andrew and St. Patrick were merged. The riding was located in downtown Toronto between Yonge Street to Bathurst Street and included areas such as Spadina Avenue, Kensington Market, the Annex, and the affluent neighbourhood of Forest Hill.

It was named after St. Andrew's and St. Patrick's wards, which had been historical names for two wards in the city of Toronto.

The riding was abolished for the 1999 provincial election. Portions of it were distributed among Trinity—Spadina, St. Paul's, Toronto Centre—Rosedale, and Eglinton—Lawrence.

== Members of Provincial Parliament ==
St. Andrew—St. Patrick
Assembly	Years	Member	Party
Created from parts of St. Andrew and St. Patrick in 1967
28th	1967–1971	Allan Grossman	Progressive Conservative
29th	1971–1975	Allan Grossman	Progressive Conservative
30th	1975–1977	Larry Grossman	Progressive Conservative
31st	1977–1981	Larry Grossman	Progressive Conservative
32nd	1981–1985	Larry Grossman	Progressive Conservative
33rd	1985–1987	Larry Grossman	Progressive Conservative
34th	1987–1990	Ron Kanter	Liberal
35th	1990–1994	Zanana Akande (Note: Akande resigned in 1994. A by-election was called but it was superseded by the 1995 election.)	New Democratic
36th	1995–1999	Isabel Bassett	Progressive Conservative
Sourced from the Ontario Legislative Assembly
Merged into Trinity—Spadina, St. Paul's, Toronto Centre—Rosedale and Eglinton—Lawrence after 1999

== Election results ==
1995 Ontario general election
Party	Candidate	Votes	%	±%
Progressive Conservative	Isabel Bassett	13,092	40.43	+9.58
Liberal	Carolyn Bennett	9,413	29.07	–0.77
New Democratic	David Jacobs	9,231	28.50	–5.95
Green	Hamish Wilson	271	0.84	–2.88
Natural Law	Bruce Hislop	237	0.73	–
Libertarian	Mark Scott	141	0.44	–0.71
Total valid votes		32,385	99.00	
Total rejected, unmarked and declined ballots		328	1.00	–0.24
Turnout		32,713	67.16	+0.27
Eligible voters		48,709		
Progressive Conservative gain from New Democratic		Swing		+7.76
Source: Elections Ontario

1990 Ontario general election
Party	Candidate	Votes	%	±%
New Democratic	Zanana Akande	10,321	34.45	+16.37
Progressive Conservative	Nancy Jackman	9,241	30.85	–2.96
Liberal	Ron Kanter	8,938	29.84	–15.82
Green	Jim Harris	1,112	3.71	–
Libertarian	Douglas Quinn	344	1.15	–1.31
Total valid votes		29,956	98.76	
Total rejected, unmarked and declined ballots		377	1.24	+0.61
Turnout		30,333	66.89	+2.51
Eligible voters		45,347		
New Democratic gain from Liberal		Swing		+16.10
Source: Elections Ontario

1987 Ontario general election
Party	Candidate	Votes	%	±%
Liberal	Ron Kanter	14,159	45.66	+20.86
Progressive Conservative	Larry Grossman	10,483	33.80	–6.66
New Democratic	Gladys Rothman	5,608	18.08	–14.71
Libertarian	Alex MacDonald	761	2.45	–
Total valid votes		31,011	99.37	
Total rejected ballots		197	0.63	–0.15
Turnout		31,208	64.38	+0.57
Eligible voters		48,477		
Liberal gain from Progressive Conservative		Swing		+17.79
Source: Elections Ontario

1985 Ontario general election
Party	Candidate	Votes	%	±%
Progressive Conservative	Larry Grossman	10,332	40.47	–8.63
New Democratic	Meg Griffiths	8,373	32.80	+15.73
Liberal	Jim DaCosta	6,330	24.79	–6.67
Communist	Cathy Laurier	264	1.03	+0.35
Green	Judy Hannon	232	0.91	–
Total valid votes		25,531	99.22	
Total rejected ballots		202	0.79	–0.24
Turnout		25,733	63.80	+6.89
Eligible voters		40,332		
Progressive Conservative hold		Swing		–12.18
Source: Elections Ontario

1981 Ontario general election
Party	Candidate	Votes	%	±%
Progressive Conservative	Larry Grossman	10,674	49.10	–0.28
Liberal	Anne Johnston	6,839	31.46	+18.61
New Democratic	Stanley E. Kutz	3,709	17.06	–19.11
Independent	Judy Darcy	262	1.21	–
Communist	Jeanne McGuire	148	0.68	–0.19
Independent	Sophia M. Firth	106	0.49	–
Total valid votes		21,738	98.98	
Total rejected ballots		225	1.02	+0.25
Turnout		21,963	56.92	–7.27
Eligible voters		38,589		
Progressive Conservative hold		Swing		–9.45
Source: Elections Ontario

1977 Ontario general election
Party	Candidate	Votes	%	±%
Progressive Conservative	Larry Grossman	11,128	49.38	+12.72
New Democratic	Barbara Beardsley	8,151	36.17	+1.46
Liberal	Edward Clarke	2,895	12.85	–14.24
Communist	Anna Larsen	196	0.87	–0.67
Libertarian	Vincent H. Miller	164	0.73	–
Total valid votes		22,534	99.23	
Total rejected ballots		176	0.78	–0.06
Turnout		22,710	64.18	+1.92
Eligible voters		35,383		
Progressive Conservative hold		Swing		+5.63
Source: Elections Ontario

1975 Ontario general election
Party	Candidate	Votes	%	±%
Progressive Conservative	Larry Grossman	8,054	36.66	–9.95
New Democratic	Barbara Beardsley	7,625	34.71	–6.38
Liberal	Fred Kan	5,951	27.09	+18.05
Communist	Frank Cunningham	339	1.54	+0.42
Total valid votes		21,969	99.17	
Total rejected ballots		184	0.83	–0.08
Turnout		22,153	62.26	–6.07
Eligible voters		35,582		
Progressive Conservative hold		Swing		–1.79
Source: Elections Ontario

1971 Ontario general election
Party	Candidate	Votes	%	±%
Progressive Conservative	Allan Grossman	9,588	46.61	+5.64
New Democratic	Dan Heap	8,451	41.09	+16.36
Liberal	Elizabeth (Liz) Catty	1,860	9.04	–24.11
Independent	Istvan Kovacs	275	1.34	–
Communist	Elizabeth Hill	231	1.12	–
Social Credit	John Bilan	164	0.80	–
Total valid votes		20,569	99.08	
Total rejected ballots		190	0.92	–0.19
Turnout		20,759	68.33	+9.88
Eligible voters		30,382		
Progressive Conservative hold		Swing		–5.36
Source: Elections Ontario

1967 Ontario general election
Party	Candidate	Votes	%
Progressive Conservative	Allan Grossman	6,142	40.97
Liberal	Leonard Shifrin	4,970	33.15
New Democratic	Adam Fuerstenberg	3,707	24.73
Independent	Dorothy Cureatz	172	1.15
Total valid votes		14,991	98.89
Total rejected ballots		168	1.11
Turnout		15,159	58.45
Eligible voters		25,935	
Progressive Conservative pickup new district.			
Source: Elections Ontario

== See also ==
- List of Ontario provincial electoral districts
- Canadian provincial electoral districts
