= St. Patrick (provincial electoral district) =

Provincial electoral district in Ontario, Canada

Coordinates: 43.659°N 79.3960°W

Ontario electoral district
- St. Patrick, in relation to the other Toronto ridings, after the 1926 redistribution.

Defunct provincial electoral district
- Legislature: Legislative Assembly of Ontario
- District created: 1925
- District abolished: 1967
- First contested: 1926
- Last contested: 1963

St. Patrick was a provincial electoral district in Ontario, Canada, that was established in 1926 out of the district of Toronto Northeast. It lasted until 1967 when it was merged with St. Andrew to form St. Andrew—St. Patrick.

St. Patrick riding took its name from the former "St. Patrick's ward" of the City of Toronto.

== Boundaries ==
It was created in a major redistribution in 1926. Its boundaries consisted of Spadina Avenue on the west from Toronto Harbour north to the city limits just north of St. Clair Avenue. On the east the boundary followed Simcoe Street north from the harbour to Queen Street West. After a short jog east to University Avenue it followed that street north through Queen's Park Crescent and then continued north on Avenue Road through to the city limits just north of St. Clair Avenue West.

== Members of Provincial Parliament ==
St. Patrick
Assembly	Years	Member	Party
Created from parts of Toronto Southwest, Toronto Northeast and Toronto Northwest ridings
17th	1926–1929	John Currie	Conservative
18th	1929–1934	Edward Joseph Murphy	Conservative
19th	1934–1937	Frederick Fraser Hunter (Note: In 1938, the title of Member of the Legislative Assembly was officially changed to Member of Provincial Parliament. Previously, it was unofficially used in the media and in the Legislature.)	Liberal
20th	1937–1943	Frederick Fraser Hunter	Liberal
21st	1943–1945	Kelso Roberts	Progressive Conservative
22nd	1945–1948	Kelso Roberts	Progressive Conservative
23rd	1948–1951	Charles Rea	Progressive Conservative
24th	1951–1955	Kelso Roberts	Progressive Conservative
25th	1955–1959	Kelso Roberts	Progressive Conservative
26th	1959–1963	Kelso Roberts	Progressive Conservative
27th	1963–1967	Kelso Roberts	Progressive Conservative
Sourced from the Ontario Legislative Assembly
Merged with St. Andrew to form St. Andrew—St. Patrick

== Election results ==
1963 Ontario general election
Party	Candidate	Votes	%	±%
Progressive Conservative	Kelso Roberts	4,821	47.75	–11.46
Liberal	Mark MacGuigan	4,044	40.05	+11.77
New Democratic	Gerald Soloway	1,025	10.15	–2.35
Communist	Rae Allan Murphy	153	1.52	–
Social Credit	James Audy	54	0.53	–
Total valid votes		10,097	98.59	
Total rejected ballots		144	1.41	–0.05
Turnout		10,241	60.58	+8.82
Eligible voters		16,905		
Progressive Conservative hold		Swing		–11.61
Source: Elections Ontario

1959 Ontario general election
Party	Candidate	Votes	%	±%
Progressive Conservative	Kelso Roberts	5,298	59.21	+4.60
Liberal	Lance Evans	2,531	28.29	+2.80
Co-operative Commonwealth	Bruce Hewlett	1,119	12.51	–3.86
Total valid votes		8,948	98.55	
Total rejected ballots		132	1.45	+0.11
Turnout		9,080	51.76	+0.21
Eligible voters		17,541		
Progressive Conservative hold		Swing		+0.90
Source: Elections Ontario

1955 Ontario general election
Party	Candidate	Votes	%	±%
Progressive Conservative	Kelso Roberts	5,165	54.60	–3.36
Liberal	Donald G. Plaxton	2,411	25.49	+6.20
Co-operative Commonwealth	Bruce Hewlett	1,548	16.37	–6.38
Labor–Progressive	Ben Shek	335	3.54	–
Total valid votes		9,459	98.65	
Total rejected ballots		129	1.35	–0.43
Turnout		9,588	51.56	–1.78
Eligible voters		18,597		
Progressive Conservative hold		Swing		–4.78
Source: Elections Ontario

1951 Ontario general election
Party	Candidate	Votes	%	±%
Progressive Conservative	Kelso Roberts	7,400	57.97	+13.90
Co-operative Commonwealth	William Newcombe	2,904	22.75	–11.18
Liberal	William A. MacKenzie	2,462	19.29	–2.72
Total valid votes		12,766	98.22	
Total rejected ballots		231	1.78	+0.33
Turnout		12,997	53.34	–13.15
Eligible voters		24,367		
Progressive Conservative hold		Swing		+12.54
Source: Elections Ontario

1948 Ontario general election
Party	Candidate	Votes	%	±%
Progressive Conservative	Charles Edward Rea	6,946	44.06	–6.15
Co-operative Commonwealth	John H. Osler	5,349	33.93	+13.40
Liberal	Lionel Conacher	3,469	22.01	+2.09
Total valid votes		15,764	98.55	
Total rejected ballots		232	1.45	–0.25
Turnout		15,996	66.48	–0.91
Eligible voters		24,060		
Progressive Conservative hold		Swing		–9.77
Source: Elections Ontario

1945 Ontario general election
Party	Candidate	Votes	%	±%
Progressive Conservative	Kelso Roberts	7,974	50.21	+6.50
Co-operative Commonwealth	John H. Osler	3,261	20.53	–8.13
Liberal	Joseph Gould	3,163	19.92	–7.71
Independent	Sam Walsh	1,484	9.34	–
Total valid votes		15,882	98.30	
Total rejected ballots		274	1.70	+0.75
Turnout		16,156	67.40	+15.48
Eligible voters		23,971		
Progressive Conservative hold		Swing		+7.31
Source: Elections Ontario

=== 1934 electoral boundaries ===
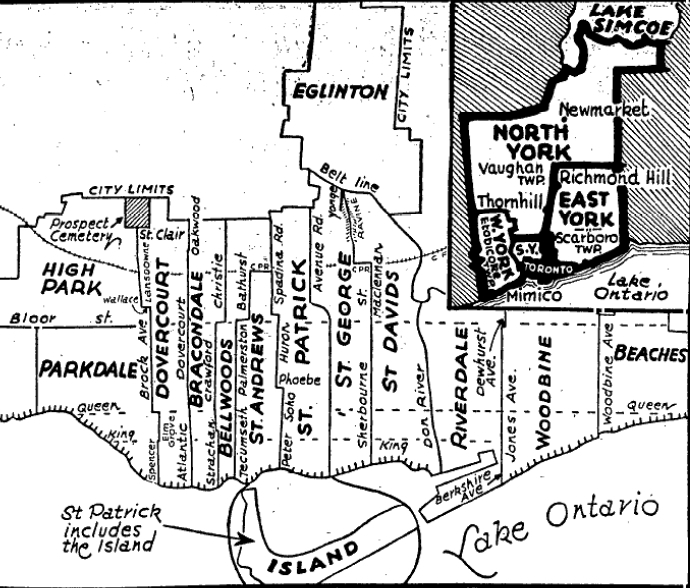
Toronto riding boundaries after 1934 redistribution

1943 Ontario general election
Party	Candidate	Votes	%	±%
Progressive Conservative	Kelso Roberts	4,694	43.71	+0.54
Co-operative Commonwealth	John H. Osler	3,078	28.66	+21.21
Liberal	Fred Hamilton	2,967	27.63	–20.82
Total valid votes		10,739	99.05	
Total rejected ballots		103	0.95	–0.71
Turnout		10,842	51.92	–12.66
Eligible voters		20,881		
Progressive Conservative gain from Liberal		Swing		+10.68
Source: Elections Ontario

1937 Ontario general election
Party	Candidate	Votes	%	±%
Liberal	Frederick Fraser Hunter	6,161	48.45	–1.63
Conservative	Kelso Roberts	5,489	43.17	–6.75
Co-operative Commonwealth	Felix Lazarus	947	7.45	–
Independent Conservative	G. N. Saunders	119	0.94	–
Total valid votes		12,716	98.34	
Total rejected ballots		215	1.66	+0.08
Turnout		12,931	64.58	+1.59
Eligible voters		20,022		
Liberal hold		Swing		+2.56
Source: Elections Ontario

1934 Ontario general election
Party	Candidate	Votes	%	±%
Liberal	Frederick Fraser Hunter	5,704	50.08	+31.54
Conservative	Edward Murphy	5,686	49.92	–16.85
Total valid votes		11,390	98.42	
Total rejected ballots		183	1.58	+0.36
Turnout		11,573	63.00	+16.77
Eligible voters		18,371		
Liberal gain from Conservative		Swing		+24.19
Source: Elections Ontario

=== 1926 electoral boundaries ===
1929 Ontario general election
Party	Candidate	Votes	%	±%
Conservative	Edward Murphy	4,473	66.77	–2.87
Liberal	Joseph Early Belfry	1,242	18.54	+12.28
Independent Conservative	Helen Whitfield Currie	859	12.82	–
Communist	Robert Edward Knowles	125	1.87	–
Total valid votes		6,699	98.78	
Total rejected ballots		83	1.22	+0.45
Turnout		6,782	46.22	–19.26
Eligible voters		14,672		
Conservative hold		Swing		–7.57
Source: Elections Ontario

1926 Ontario general election
Party	Candidate	Votes	%
Conservative	John Allister Currie	6,339	69.64
Prohibitionist	John Wanless	2,194	24.10
Liberal	Louis Patrick Burns	570	6.26
Total valid votes		9,103	99.23
Total rejected ballots		71	0.77
Turnout		9,174	65.48
Eligible voters		14,010	
Conservative pickup new district.			
Source: Elections Ontario

== See also ==
- List of Ontario provincial electoral districts
- Canadian provincial electoral districts
