= Jim Coutts =

Canadian political advisor (1938–2013)

- Born: May 16, 1938; High River, Alberta, Canada
- Died: December 31, 2013 (aged 75); Toronto, Ontario, Canada
- Education: University of Alberta; Harvard School of Business
- Occupations: lawyer, business person

James Allan Coutts CM (May 16, 1938 – December 31, 2013) was a Canadian lawyer, businessman, and advisor to two prime ministers, most notably as Prime Minister Pierre Trudeau's Principal Secretary from 1973 to 1981.

== Biography ==
Born in High River, Alberta, he was raised in Nanton, Alberta. He received a Bachelor of Arts degree in 1960 and a law degree in 1961 from the University of Alberta and an MBA from the Harvard Business School in 1968. He was called to the Bar of Alberta in 1962.

From 1961 to 1963, he practiced law in Calgary, Alberta. From 1963 to 1966, he served as Appointments Secretary to Liberal Prime Minister Lester B. Pearson. After receiving his MBA, he was a Consultant with McKinsey & Company from 1968 to 1970. From 1970 to 1975, he was a Partner with the Canada Consulting Group. From 1975 to 1981, he was the Principal Secretary to Prime Minister Pierre Elliott Trudeau.

In 1981, Trudeau appointed Liberal MP Peter Stollery to the Senate so Coutts could run for the House of Commons of Canada in what was thought of as the safe Ontario riding of Spadina. The plan backfired when Coutts narrowly lost to New Democrat Dan Heap despite personal interventions from Trudeau. Coutts ran again, but lost by a heavier margin in the 1984 election.

He subsequently left politics and entered business with an international career in industrial explosives. He was a principal of Lowther Consultants Limited and the chairman and chief executive officer of CIC Canadian Investment Capital Limited.

He was also a philanthropist and a major donor to the University of Lethbridge. He was a member of the Board and Foundation of The Hospital for Sick Children and was a co-founder of the W.O. Mitchell Literary Prize.

In 2001, he was made a Member of the Order of Canada.

Coutts died of cancer on December 31, 2013. His private papers were left with Trinity College at the University of Toronto and opened in January 2025, when they became the subject of a book later that year by Ron Graham titled The Coutts Diaries: Power, Politics, and Pierre Trudeau, 1973-1981, published by Sutherland House Books.

== Electoral history ==
Canadian federal by-election, August 17, 1981: Spadina Appointment of Peter Stollery to the Senate
Party	Candidate	Votes
New Democratic	Dan Heap	7,586
Liberal	Jim Coutts	7,372
Progressive Conservative	Laura Sabia	6,581
Rhinoceros	Decriminalized Douglas	233
Libertarian	Robert Champlin	162
Independent	Anne McBride	84
Independent	John Turmel	69
Independent	Ronald Rodgers	41

1984 Canadian federal election: Spadina
Party	Candidate	Votes
New Democratic	Dan Heap	13,241
Liberal	Jim Coutts	11,880
Progressive Conservative	Ying Hope	8,061
Libertarian	William E. Burt	358
Rhinoceros	Mara Maria Proussaefs	289
Independent	Sam Guha	98

== Archives ==
There is a James A. Coutts fonds at Library and Archives Canada.

== Sources ==
- "Canadian Who's Who 1997 entry". University of Toronto Press.
- "Their Trudeau Years". University of Alberta.
- Bothwell, Robert (June 5, 2014). "Jim Coutts". The Canadian Encyclopedia. Historica Canada. Archived from the original on September 30, 2007.
