= Ron Kanter =

Canadian politician

Ronald M. Kanter

Ontario MPP
- In office 1987–1990
- Preceded by: Larry Grossman
- Succeeded by: Zanana Akande
- Constituency: St. Andrew—St. Patrick

Personal details
- Born: February 25, 1948 (age 78) Brantford, Ontario
- Party: Liberal
- Occupation: Lawyer, administrator

Ronald M. Kanter (born February 25, 1948) is a former politician in Ontario, Canada. He served in the Legislative Assembly of Ontario as a Liberal from 1987 to 1990.

== Background ==
Kanter was educated at Glendon College, York University, the University of Toronto Faculty of Law, and Osgoode Hall Law School. He was called to the Bar in 1976. In 1984, he was named a course director at the University of Toronto Faculty of Law. Kanter served as special assistant to Ontario Liberal Party leader Stuart Smith from 1976 to 1980.

== Politics ==
He served as an alderman on the Toronto City Council from 1980 to 1987, and was also a member of the Metro Toronto council from 1985 to 1987.

He was elected to the Ontario legislature in the 1987 provincial election, upsetting Progressive Conservative leader and longtime MPP Larry Grossman by 3,676 votes in the constituency of St. Andrew—St. Patrick. Shortly after the election he was appointed as Parliamentary Assistant to Solicitor General Joan Smith in David Peterson's government.

In July 1989, Kanter was implicated in the Patti Starr affair. Starr, who was head of the National Council of Jewish Women, misused her position by having the organization make political contributions to the riding associations of prominent Liberal MPPs. Kanter's riding of St. Andrew-St. Patrick was among those who received these illegal contributions. In August, when Peterson shuffled his cabinet in the wake of the scandal, Kanter was not included.

The Liberals were defeated by the Ontario New Democratic Party in the 1990 provincial election. Kanter's connection to the tainted Starr scandal was mentioned as one of the reasons that he finished third in his bid for re-election, 1,383 votes behind winner Zanana Akande of the NDP.

== Later life ==
Kanter now practises regulatory law with the firm of Macdonald Sager LLP. He serves on the Toronto Board of Trade Task Force, and writes and speaks frequently on municipal government and planning issues.

In July 1990, he authored a publication entitled "Space for all: options for a Greater Toronto Area greenlands strategy". The report, commissioned by the provincial government recommended the establishment of a regional green lands system. Kanter said "Not only should green lands be protected, but they should be linked wherever possible by trail systems, local parks, river valleys and other green corridors." The report placed special emphasis on the protection of the Oak Ridges Moraine.

== Election results ==
1980 Toronto municipal election: Toronto City Councillor, Ward Five (two members elected)
| Candidate | Votes | % |
|---|---|---|
| (x)Ying Hope | 9,926 | 37.07 |
| Ron Kanter | 6,409 | 23.93 |
| Menno Verster | 5,777 | 21.57 |
| David Scott | 3,218 | 12.02 |
| Jimmy Kabitsis | 912 | 3.41 |
| Vincent Corriero | 537 | 2.01 |
| Total valid votes | 26,779 | 100.00 |

146 out of 148 polls reporting.

1982 Toronto City Council election (2 elected)

Ward 5 (The Annex and Yorkville)
Ying Hope (incumbent) - 9,009
Ron Kanter (incumbent) - 8,558
David Scott - 3,987
Georgina Langford - 977
John Papagiannis - 622

1985 Toronto municipal election (Metropolitan Toronto Council) (1 elected)

Ward 5 (The Annex and Yorkville)
Ron Kanter (incumbent) - 9,788
Ying Hope (incumbent) - 5,849

1987 Ontario general election
| Party | Candidate | Votes | Vote % |
|---|---|---|---|
| Liberal | Ron Kanter | 14,169 | 45.7 |
| Progressive Conservative | Larry Grossman | 10,475 | 33.8 |
| New Democratic | Gladys Rothman | 5,608 | 18.1 |
| Libertarian | Alex MacDonald | 781 | 2.5 |
| | Total | 31,033 | |

1990 Ontario general election
| Party | Candidate | Votes | Vote % |
|---|---|---|---|
| New Democratic | Zanana Akande | 8,293 | 34.5 |
| Progressive Conservative | Nancy Jackman | 7,553 | 31.4 |
| Liberal | Ron Kanter | 7,262 | 30.2 |
| Green | Jim Harris | 960 | 4.0 |
| | Total | 24,068 | |
