= Kelso Roberts =

Canadian politician

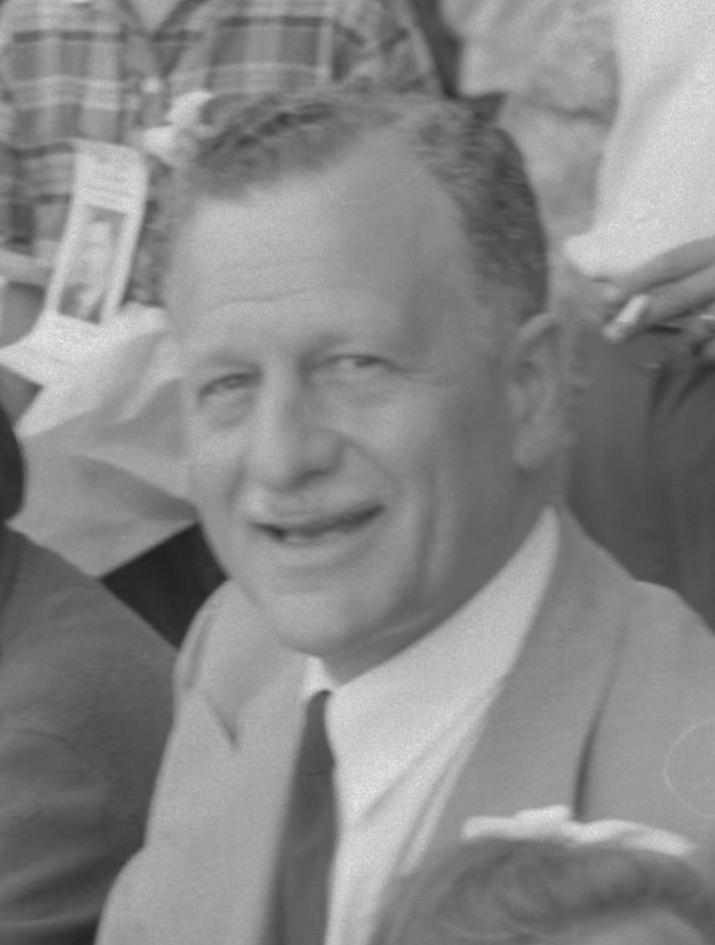
- Roberts in 1953

Ontario MPP
- In office 1951–1967
- Preceded by: Charles Edward Rea
- Succeeded by: Riding abolished
- In office 1943–1948
- Preceded by: Frederick Fraser Hunter
- Succeeded by: Charles Edward Rea
- Constituency: St. Patrick

Personal details
- Born: September 11, 1898 Hastings, Ontario, Canada
- Died: October 8, 1970 (aged 72) Toronto, Ontario, Canada
- Party: Progressive Conservative
- Spouse: Lillian Brathwaite
- Children: 3
- Education: Osgoode Law School
- Occupation: Lawyer

Archibald Kelso Roberts (September 11, 1898 – October 8, 1970) was a politician in Ontario, Canada. He was a Progressive Conservative member of the Legislative Assembly of Ontario from 1943 to 1948 and again from 1951 to 1967. Both times he represented the downtown Toronto riding of St. Patrick. He served as a senior cabinet minister in the governments of Leslie Frost and John Robarts.

== Background ==
Roberts was born in Belleville, Ontario, in 1898. Roberts was married to Lillian Brathwaite and had three sons: Alexander (Alec) Roberts, Frank Kelso Roberts, (May 14, 1939 – July 1, 2003) who became a judge in the Ontario Superior Court of Justice and a part-time judge of the Supreme Court of the Northwest Territories, and Greer Roberts.

== Politics ==
He was elected to the Legislative Assembly of Ontario as the Member of Provincial Parliament (MPP) for the Toronto riding of St. Patrick in the 1943 Ontario election that brought the Ontario Progressive Conservative Party to power under George Drew.

Though a backbencher, he ran to succeed Drew in the 1949 provincial PC leadership convention, coming in third place.

In 1955, Drew's successor as Premier of Ontario, Leslie Frost, elevated Roberts to cabinet as attorney-general. Early in his term, Roberts supported strengthening the Fair Accommodation Practices Act to require restaurants and bars to serve all customers equally, regardless of race or ethnicity.

Roberts ran for the leadership of the party again in 1961 when Frost resigned, and led on the first ballot but then fell behind John Robarts, who went on to win on the sixth ballot. Roberts remained attorney-general until 1962 when he became Minister of Lands and Forests. Kelso had delivered a report that declared organized crime was virtually nonexistent in Ontario; the position was widely ridiculed and likely led to his demotion. "In Canada," he had written, "there's nothing that can be likened to the Mafia, an organization that in Italy was dismantled long ago by Mussolini."

Roberts came under particular criticism when the press reported that he and officers of the Ontario Provincial Police had communicated with organized crime syndicates in Canada and the US. Roberts resisted calls to call a Royal Commission to investigate organized crime in Ontario and examine allegations that his ministry was covering up instances in which it deliberately or through lax procedures assisted organized crime. After the cabinet decided to give in to opposition demands that a Royal Commission be called, Roberts persisted in criticising the commission and interfering with its work until Premier Robarts decided to remove him as attorney-general and to demote him to ministry of land and forests. The Royal Commission ultimately cleared Roberts and his ministry of wrongdoing but found that organized crime was much more widespread in the province than Roberts had believed.

Roberts retired from cabinet in 1966, and retired from the legislature when the 1967 Ontario election was called. In 1969, he wrote a book, "The Member for St. Patrick - 30 Years of Ontario Political Action." He died in 1970.

=== Cabinet posts ===
Robarts ministry, Province of Ontario (1961–1971)
Cabinet post (1)
Predecessor	Office	Successor
Wilf Spooner	Minister of Lands and Forests; 1962-1966	René Brunelle
Frost ministry, Province of Ontario (1949–1961)
Cabinet post (1)
Predecessor	Office	Successor
Dana Porter	Attorney General; 1955-1962	Fred Cass
