= Peter Stollery =

Canadian politician and businessman

The Honourable Peter Alan Stollery

Canadian Senator from Ontario
- In office July 2, 1981 – November 29, 2010
- Appointed by: Pierre Trudeau

Member of Parliament for Spadina
- In office 1972–1981
- Preceded by: Sylvester Perry Ryan
- Succeeded by: Dan Heap

Personal details
- Born: November 29, 1935 (age 90) Toronto, Ontario, Canada
- Party: Liberal
- Committees: Chair, Standing Committee on Foreign Affairs; Chair, Standing Committee on Foreign Affairs and International Trade
- Portfolio: Parliamentary Secretary to the Minister of Communications (1980-1981); Parliamentary Secretary to the Secretary of State of Canada (1980-1981)

Peter Alan Stollery (born November 29, 1935) is a former Canadian politician and businessman.

== Background ==
An old Yorkville family, the Stollerys owned a furnishings store named Stollery's, which opened in 1901 in downtown Toronto. Peter Stollery, the founder’s grandson, worked on and off at the haberdashery for 24 years, first as a furnishings’ man and eventually as a manager from 1965 to 1968 after his father, Alan Stollery, died suddenly. His attachment to these roots explain his later designation in the Senate of Canada as Senator for "Bloor and Yonge", the intersection at which the store was located.

Before entering public life, Stollery also worked as a teacher in Algeria and travel writer for Maclean's. He is a Fellow of the Royal Geographical Society, and a Member of the National Liberal Club in London.

== Political career ==
Stollery was elected to the House of Commons of Canada as a Liberal candidate in the 1972 election for Spadina riding in Toronto defeating incumbent MP Perry Ryan who had left the Liberals and crossed the floor to the Progressive Conservatives. He was re-elected in the 1974, 1979 and 1980 elections. He served for a time as chairman of the Liberal Caucus (1976–1978), and as parliamentary secretary to the Secretary of State and to the Minister of Communications (1980–1981).

In 1981, Stollery was appointed to the Senate of Canada on the recommendation of Prime Minister Pierre Trudeau. Trudeau wanted to open Stollery's Spadina riding so his aide James Coutts could be elected to Parliament in a by-election. The voters rebelled, and in the subsequent by-election Coutts was defeated in what had been a safe Liberal seat by Dan Heap of the New Democratic Party. He retired from the Senate on November 29, 2010, upon reaching the mandatory retirement age of 75, at which point he had served in Parliament for over 38 years, including more than 29 years in the Senate.

In the Senate, Stollery served on several committees. He took part in numerous overseas delegations and assumed the position of Chair of the Standing Committee on Foreign Affairs (1999–2005). He continued to serve on the committee as Vice-Chair until his retirement from the Senate. He has been involved with the Canada-Europe Interparliamentary Union.

== Controversy ==
On May 29, 2006, during a session of the Standing Senate Committee on National Security and Defence, Stollery criticized Hamid Karzai, then President of Afghanistan. Although Karzai was democratically elected, Stollery implied that Karzai's ascent to power was due to US influence. He argued that Canadian troops could be better used to help “create a democratic society in Afghanistan”.

In September 2006, Stollery added that the limited presence of Canadian troops on the African continent was a result of military officials believing it was not as "sexy" as helping the U.S. by fighting in Afghanistan. He was subsequently criticized by Liberal Senator Roméo Dallaire, who called Stollery's comments "scandalous language." Dallaire stated that "Nothing is sexy in war. The whole concept of war is perverse, and the reason we're in one area and not another is because political decisions have been taken."
