= Saint-Denis (electoral district) =

Former federal electoral district in Quebec, Canada

Quebec electoral district

Defunct federal electoral district
- Legislature: House of Commons
- District created: 1914
- District abolished: 1996
- First contested: 1917
- Last contested: 1993

Saint-Denis (also known as St. Denis and St-Denis) was a federal electoral district in Quebec, Canada, that was represented in the House of Commons of Canada from 1917 to 1997.

This riding was created in 1914 as "St. Denis" from parts of Maisonneuve riding.

St. Denis riding was abolished in 1947 when it was redistributed into Papineau (electoral district) and into a successor district, "St-Denis".

In 1952, the district was abolished, and a new riding, "Saint-Denis" was created.

In 1996, the riding was abolished.

== Members of Parliament ==
This riding elected the following members of Parliament:

Parliament	Years	Member	Party
St. Denis; Riding created from Maisonneuve
13th	1917–1921	Alphonse Verville	Opposition (Laurier Liberals)
14th	1921–1925	Arthur Denis	Liberal
15th	1925–1926	Arthur Denis	Liberal
16th	1926–1930	Arthur Denis	Liberal
17th	1930–1935	Arthur Denis	Liberal
18th	1935–1940	Azellus Denis	Liberal
19th	1940–1945	Azellus Denis	Liberal
20th	1945–1949	Azellus Denis	Liberal
Riding dissolved into St-Denis and Papineau
St-Denis
21st	1949–1953	Azellus Denis	Liberal
Saint-Denis
22nd	1953–1957	Azellus Denis	Liberal
23rd	1957–1958	Azellus Denis	Liberal
24th	1958–1962	Azellus Denis	Liberal
25th	1962–1963	Azellus Denis	Liberal
26th	1963–1963	Azellus Denis	Liberal
26th	1964–1965	Marcel Prud'homme	Liberal
27th	1965–1968	Marcel Prud'homme	Liberal
28th	1968–1972	Marcel Prud'homme	Liberal
29th	1972–1974	Marcel Prud'homme	Liberal
30th	1974–1979	Marcel Prud'homme	Liberal
31st	1979–1980	Marcel Prud'homme	Liberal
32nd	1980–1984	Marcel Prud'homme	Liberal
33rd	1984–1988	Marcel Prud'homme	Liberal
34th	1988–1993	Marcel Prud'homme	Liberal
35th	1993–1997	Eleni Bakopanos	Liberal
Riding dissolved into Ahuntsic

== Election results ==
=== St. Denis, 1917–1953 ===
1917 Canadian federal election
Party	Candidate	Votes
Opposition (Laurier Liberals)	Alphonse Verville	9,708
Unknown	Roméo Houle	878
Unknown	Louis-Omnes Maille	95

1921 Canadian federal election
Party	Candidate	Votes
Liberal	Arthur Denis	18,703
Independent	Joseph Cyriac Gauthier	3,738
Independent	Pierre-Louis-Wilfrid Dupré	1,366

1925 Canadian federal election
Party	Candidate	Votes
Liberal	Arthur Denis	13,850
Conservative	Aldéric Blain	7,372
Liberal	Léonce Plante	7,216

1926 Canadian federal election
Party	Candidate	Votes
Liberal	Arthur Denis	21,497
Conservative	René Marion	4,863

1930 Canadian federal election
Party	Candidate	Votes
Liberal	Arthur Denis	28,646
Conservative	Joseph-Cyriac Gauthier	14,382
Independent	Idola Saint-Jean	1,732

1935 Canadian federal election
Party	Candidate	Votes
Liberal	Azellus Denis	19,047
Reconstruction	Joseph-Charles Rancourt	8,067
Conservative	Joseph Stanislas Leveillé	1,519
Labour	Charles-E. Perry	1,002
Independent	Joseph-Cyriac Gauthier	761

1940 Canadian federal election
Party	Candidate	Votes
Liberal	Azellus Denis	18,948
National Government	Hector Grenon	4,979
Independent Liberal	Antonio Lussier	4,274
Independent Liberal	J.-Antoine Champagne	967

1945 Canadian federal election
Party	Candidate	Votes
Liberal	Azellus Denis	21,201
Bloc populaire	Marcel Poulin	10,149
Independent	Paul Fournier	4,057
Social Credit	Camille-E. Roberge	534

=== St-Denis, 1949–1953 ===
1949 Canadian federal election
Party	Candidate	Votes
Liberal	Azellus Denis	18,866
Progressive Conservative	Bernard Goulet	9,509
Co-operative Commonwealth	Bernard L. Boulanger	776

=== Saint-Denis, 1953–1997 ===
1953 Canadian federal election
Party	Candidate	Votes
Liberal	Azellus Denis	17,359
Progressive Conservative	Bernard Goulet	6,118
Co-operative Commonwealth	Michel Forest	573
Labor–Progressive	Lucien Gaboury	209

1957 Canadian federal election
Party	Candidate	Votes
Liberal	Azellus Denis	17,027
Progressive Conservative	Bernard Goulet	4,587
Independent Liberal	F.-Avila Panneton	2,329
Co-operative Commonwealth	Bernard-L. Boulanger	999

1958 Canadian federal election
Party	Candidate	Votes
Liberal	Azellus Denis	14,737
Progressive Conservative	Jean Marion	12,166
Independent Liberal	F.-Avila Panneton	917
Social Credit	Léon Alarie	879

1962 Canadian federal election
Party	Candidate	Votes
Liberal	Azellus Denis	11,728
Progressive Conservative	Rodolphe Sauvé	8,282
New Democratic	Bertrand Proulx	2,261
Social Credit	Henri Paquet	1,908
Capital familial	Henri-Georges Grenier	393

1963 Canadian federal election
Party	Candidate	Votes
Liberal	Azellus Denis	11,707
Social Credit	Henri Paquet	4,573
Progressive Conservative	Rolland Lalumière	4,035
New Democratic	Réjeanne Dinelle	2,637

By-election: On Mr. Denis' resignation, 27 December 1963

By-election on 10 February 1964
Party	Candidate	Votes
Liberal	Marcel Prud'homme	7,781
Progressive Conservative	Rodolphe Sauvé	4,768
Ralliement créditiste	Henri Paquet	2,052
New Democratic	Réjeanne Dinelle	605
Parti républicain	Paul Ferron	183
Parti humain familial	Henri-Georges Grenier	68

1965 Canadian federal election
Party	Candidate	Votes
Liberal	Marcel Prud'homme	11,000
Progressive Conservative	Jean Caumartin	5,270
New Democratic	Réjeanne Dinelle	2,872
Ralliement créditiste	Aimé Dufour	1,787
Ouvrier indépendant	Fernando-Avila Panneton	352

1968 Canadian federal election
Party	Candidate	Votes
Liberal	Marcel Prud'homme	17,022
Progressive Conservative	Guy Dozois	3,653
New Democratic	Frank Auf der Maur	1,908
Ralliement créditiste	André Poitras	1,165

1972 Canadian federal election
Party	Candidate	Votes
Liberal	Marcel Prud'homme	16,991
Social Credit	André Poitras	3,968
Progressive Conservative	Symone Beaudin	3,695
Independent	Henry Morgentaler	1,509
Not affiliated	Polyvios Tsakanikas	302

1974 Canadian federal election
Party	Candidate	Votes
Liberal	Marcel Prud'homme	15,310
Progressive Conservative	David M. Bernstein	4,897
New Democratic	Jean-Guy Albert	1,963
Social Credit	Tony Chatoyan	1,630
Marxist–Leninist	Polyvios Tsakanikas	208
Communist	Samuel J. Walsh	162

1979 Canadian federal election
Party	Candidate	Votes
Liberal	Marcel Prud'homme	30,552
Progressive Conservative	David Bernstein	3,380
Social Credit	Richer M. Francœur	3,177
New Democratic	Richard Marcille	2,412
Rhinoceros	Rodrigue Chocolat Tremblay	1,056
Marxist–Leninist	Panagiotis Macrisopoulos	238
Union populaire	Diane Martin Lelièvre	226
Communist	Samuel Walsh	187

1980 Canadian federal election
Party	Candidate	Votes
Liberal	Marcel Prud'homme	28,383
New Democratic	Raymond Beaudoin	3,485
Progressive Conservative	David M. Bernstein	2,312
Rhinoceros	Serge Rose	1,232
Social Credit	Richer Francœur	743
Marxist–Leninist	Panagiotis Macrysopoulos	182
Communist	Samuel Walsh	165
Union populaire	Gilles Maillé	161

1984 Canadian federal election
Party	Candidate	Votes
Liberal	Marcel Prud'homme	18,750
Progressive Conservative	Peter Georgakakos	12,122
New Democratic	Scott McKay	4,581
Rhinoceros	Ben Rhino 97 Michel Benoit	1,588
Parti nationaliste	Clovis Gaudet	981
Independent	Claude Lamoureux	297
Communist	Samuel Walsh	266
Commonwealth of Canada	Serge Buchet	125

1988 Canadian federal election
Party	Candidate	Votes
Liberal	Marcel Prud'homme	19,928
Progressive Conservative	Madeleine Provost	12,843
New Democratic	Jaime Llambias-Wolff	6,151
Rhinoceros	Chérubin Guy Roy	1,166
Green	René E. Pratte	1,107
Not affiliated	Panagiotis Macrisopoulos	341
Social Credit	Doris Lacroix	269
Communist	Samuel Walsh	204
Commonwealth of Canada	Nancy Duchaine	191

1993 Canadian federal election
Party	Candidate	Votes
Liberal	Eleni Bakopanos	21,985
Bloc Québécois	Gilles Pelchat	15,021
Progressive Conservative	Aïda Baghjajian	2,291
New Democratic	Josée Panet-Raymond	965
Independent	Stéphane Lapointe	423
Natural Law	Alain-Édouard Lord	397
Abolitionist	Fernand Belisle	256
Marxist–Leninist	Panagiotis Macrisopoulos	206
Commonwealth of Canada	Benoit Chalifoux	170

== See also ==
- List of Canadian electoral districts
- Historical federal electoral districts of Canada
