= Anthony Graham =

Canadian businessman

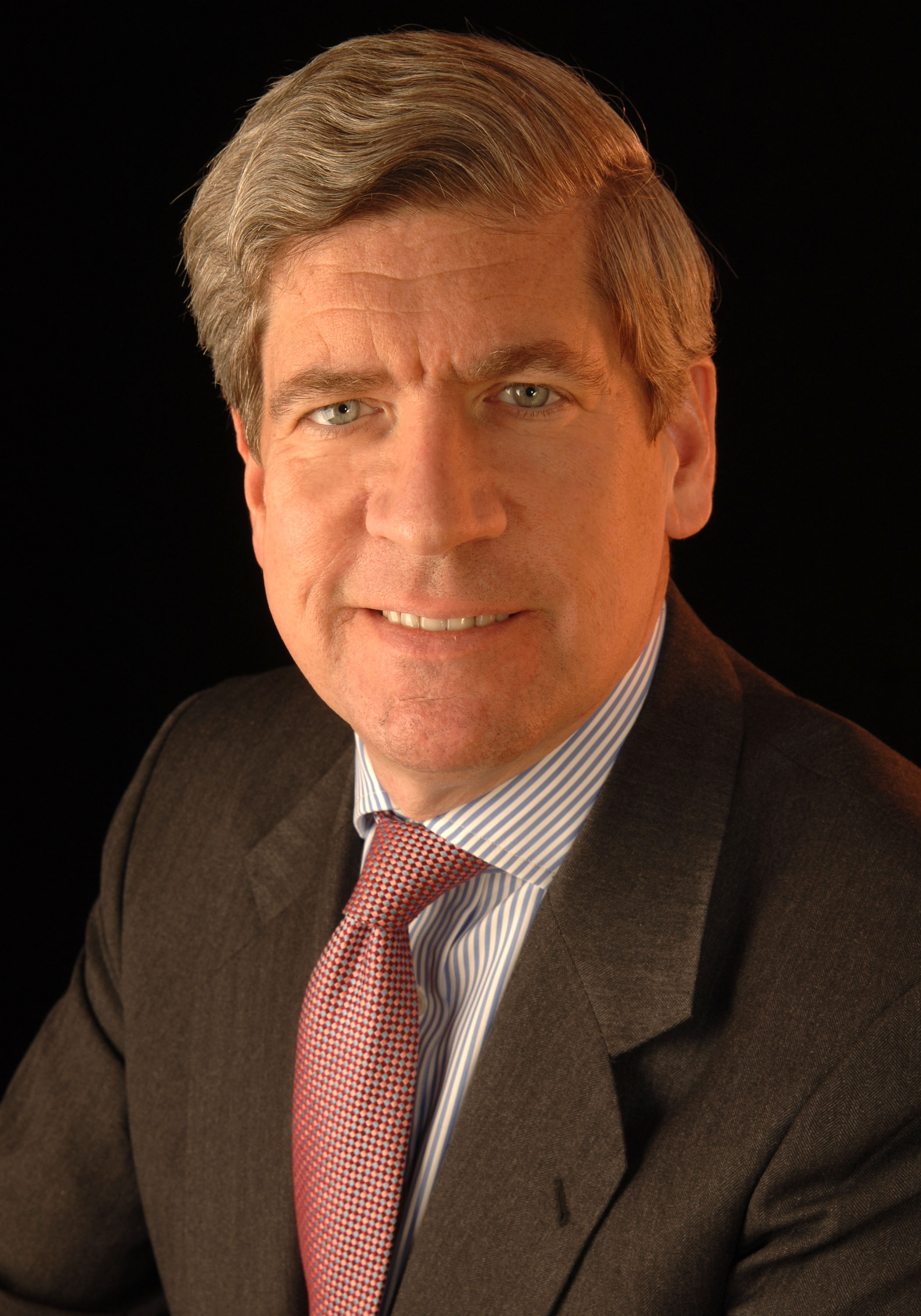
Anthony R. Graham in 2017

Anthony Richard Graham (born January 8, 1957 in Montreal) is a Canadian businessman based in Toronto, Canada. He is presently president and chief executive officer of Sumarria Inc. and chairman of Graymont Limited.

== Family and Education ==
Graham is the son of Francis Ronald Graham, Jr. and Renée Beatrice Moncel. He married Helen Marie (née. Chisholm) on September 16, 1978 and they have three daughters, Laura (married to Taylor Dixon), Diana (married to Patrick Hamm) and Marina (married to Barnaby Lewis). He is the brother of journalist Ron Graham, nephew of military general Robert Moncel and nephew to former politician Bill Graham.

Graham was educated at Selwyn House School and Bishop's College School. He attended the University of Western Ontario from 1974 to 1976. He was awarded an honorary doctorate of laws degree from Brock University in 2007.

== Career ==
Graham received his early education in the investment business working during summer holidays at his father's brokerage firm Oswald, Drinkwater and Graham Ltd.

In 1976, he joined Wood Gundy Ltd., becoming one of the youngest stockbrokers in Canada.

In 1979, Graham moved to London, England, where he was appointed resident manager of Lévesque Beaubien Inc., a firm of Canadian stockbrokers, dealing with U.K. and European portfolio managers investing in the Canadian capital markets. In 1983, he was appointed managing director of Lévesque Beaubien Inc. in Toronto with the mandate to grow the firm's presence outside of the Province of Quebec. During this time, Graham served on the boards of The Toronto Stock Exchange and the Canadian Securities Institute.

In 1986, Graham led a group of partners to purchase Lévesque, Beaubien Inc. from the then controlling shareholder and proceeded to take the firm public. Following these transactions, Graham became the largest shareholder of the firm.

In 1989, following the deregulation of the Canadian financial service industry, (note: #) the National Bank of Canada purchased 75% of the firm (with the balance held by Graham and fellow partners) and in 1999, the firm purchased First Marathon Securities, Inc. and was then taken completely private by the bank and changed its name to National Bank Financial.

In June 2000, Graham became president of Wittington Investments, Limited, the principal holding company of the Weston/Loblaw Group. From 2017 to 2019, he served as vice chairman. During his time at Wittington, he has served in various different capacities, including director of George Weston Limited (1996 – 2016), Loblaw Companies (1998–2015), chairman of President's Choice Bank (2000–2015), president of Selfridges Group (2003–2017) and chairman of Choice Properties REIT(2017 – 2020).

Graham is the chairman, president and CEO of Sumarria Inc., which is the largest shareholder (along with the extended Graham Family) of Graymont Limited of which he is chairman. Graymont has production and distribution facilities for chemical lime, stone and precipitated calcium carbonate in Canada, the United States, Australia, New Zealand, Malaysia and the Philippines as well as a significant investment in the largest lime producer in Mexico and South America. Graham has been a director of Graymont since 1987 to the present and served as chairman from 2003 to 2008 and was reappointed in 2022.

Graham has also served on the boards of Power Corporation of Canada since 2001 and Bombardier Inc. since 2019. He is a former director of Brown Thomas & Company Limited, Garbell Holdings Limited, Gardiner Group Capital, Holt Renfrew & Co. Limited, Power Financial Corporation, Scott's Hospitality Inc., Scott's Restaurants Inc., Sulconam Inc. and Victoria Square Ventures Inc.

== Community involvement ==
=== The Arts ===
Since 2008, Graham has served as the chairman of The Ontario Arts Foundation and has been vice-chairman of the Council for Business and the Arts in Canada since 2002.

Graham was a board member of The Shaw Festival from 1993 to 1998, serving as chairman in 1995–1996. He has been the founding chairman of The Shaw Festival Theatre Endowment Foundation since 2002.

Graham has been a trustee of the Art Gallery of Ontario since 1993, a founding board member of Luminato since 2006 and is a past board member of Massey Hall/Roy Thomson Hall (1998 – 2007).

=== Health, education and research ===
Graham was the chairman of the Charter for Business of the Duke of Edinburgh Awards in Canada from 2017 - 2020. He served on the board of St. Michael's Hospital from 2009 to 2019 and has served on the board of the Canadian Institute for Advanced Research (CIFAR) since 2002.

He served on the board of Branksome Hall School from 1989 to 2001, serving as chairman from 1997 to 2001. He also served as chairman of the Branksome Hall Foundation from 2002 – 2013. During this time he also served on the board of the Canadian Education Standards Institute.

=== Military ===
Graham served as the honorary colonel of The Royal Regiment of Canada from 2011 to 2019.

=== Honors and memberships ===
In 2007, Graham was awarded an honorary doctorate of laws degree from Brock University. In 1990, he was awarded the Government of Ontario Volunteer Services award. In 1995, he was recognized by the Financial Post as one of Canada's Top 40 Under 40. In 2012 was presented the

Queen Elizabeth II Diamond Jubilee Medal.

Graham is a former member of the Business Council of Canada, Chief Executives Organization and the World Presidents Organization. He is a member and past president of the Toronto Club.

== News articles ==
Globe and Mail - Globe Investor

Globe and Mail - Report on Business

Globe and Mail - Report on Business

== See also ==
- List of Bishop's College School alumni
