= Samuel Factor (politician) =

Canadian politician

Member of the Canadian Parliament for Toronto West Centre
- In office 1930–1935
- Preceded by: Horatio Clarence Hocken
- Succeeded by: District abolished

Member of the Canadian Parliament for Spadina
- In office 1935–1945
- Preceded by: District created
- Succeeded by: David Croll

Personal details
- Born: October 26, 1892 Russia
- Died: August 21, 1962 (aged 69)
- Party: Liberal
- Committees: Chair, Special Committee on the Dominion Elections Act, 1938 (armed services) (1943-1944)

Samuel "Sam" Factor, KC (October 26, 1892 – August 21, 1962) was a Canadian politician, lawyer and jurist and the first Jewish Member of Parliament elected to the House of Commons of Canada from Ontario.

== Background ==
Born in Tsarist Russia, Factor's family settled in Toronto when he was 10 years old. He attended McCaul Public School and Jarvis Collegiate Institute and then graduated from Osgoode Hall Law School where he earned a silver medal and two scholarships. He enlisted in the Canadian Army during World War I and served as a lieutenant.

== Politics ==
Factor was elected to the Toronto School Board in 1923 and 1924 before winning an aldermanic seat representing Ward 4 on Toronto City Council where he served from 1926 until 1928.

In 1930, he was elected to the House of Commons as the Liberal MP for Toronto West Centre, a riding that was home to much of Toronto's Jewish population as well as many other recent immigrants. He defeated former Mayor of Toronto Tommy Church in what had been a Conservative riding bucking a national trend in the 1930 federal election that saw the Conservatives defeating the incumbent Liberal government of William Lyon Mackenzie King. He was the only Liberal elected from Toronto in that election. Factor was re-elected in the 1935 election for the newly created riding of Spadina. He was again re-elected in 1940 and, with the loss of two other Liberal MPs in Toronto, was again the city's only representative in the Liberal caucus

With two other MPs, A.A. Heaps of Winnipeg and Sam Jacobs of Montreal, Factor fought against quotas on Jewish immigration and anti-Semitism.

While serving in Parliament during World War II, Factor enlisted with the Royal Canadian Air Force, retiring in 1944 with the rank of Squadron Leader.

== Judiciary ==
In 1945, Factor was appointed to the bench by Prime Minister King, freeing up his Spadina riding for David Croll. He served as a York County Court judge until 1960. He attracted notice as a judge for his attitude towards drug addicts viewing them as individuals with an illness rather than criminals and pleaded with the federal government to change the law so that they could be sent by the court to hospital for treatment rather than prison. He believed that drug dealers should be treated harshly by the law, however.
