= Alphonse Verville =

Canadian politician

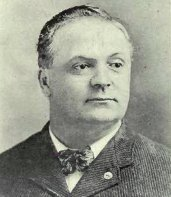

Member of the Canadian Parliament for Maisonneuve
- In office 1906–1917
- Preceded by: Raymond Préfontaine
- Succeeded by: Rodolphe Lemieux

Member of the Canadian Parliament for St. Denis
- In office 1917–1921
- Preceded by: Electoral district was created in 1914.
- Succeeded by: Arthur Denis

Personal details
- Born: October 28, 1864 Côte-St-Paul, Canada East
- Died: June 20, 1930 (aged 65) Montreal, Quebec
- Party: Labour; Laurier Liberal

Alphonse Verville (October 28, 1864 – June 20, 1930) was a Canadian politician and trade unionist.

Born and raised in the Côte-Saint-Paul neighbourhood of Montreal, Verville was a plumber by trade. At the age of 18 he moved to Chicago and joined the International Plumbers' Union. He returned to Montreal in 1893 and worked to organize plumbers. He became leader of the plumbers' union in Montreal and in 1904 became president of the MTLC, Montreal's Trades and Labour Council. Verville served as president of the Trades and Labour Congress of Canada from 1904 to 1910.

Politically, Verville was an early advocate of the trade union movement running their own candidates for political office. He was elected to the House of Commons of Canada as a Labour candidate in a 1906 by-election in Maisonneuve, defeating a Liberal opponent, and was re-elected as a Labour MP in the 1908 and 1911 federal elections. Upon entering parliament he became a supporter of the Liberals and was often billed as a Liberal-Labour MP. In his re-election contests he was supported by the Liberals who ran no candidate of their own against him. In the 1917 federal election caused by the Conscription Crisis of 1917, Verville ran and was elected as a Laurier Liberal in the riding of St-Denis. He remained in the Commons until 1921. After nine years in retirement, he died on 20 June 1930 in Montreal, at the age of 65, following stomach surgery.
