= Spadina (electoral district) =

Former federal electoral district in Ontario, Canada

Ontario electoral district
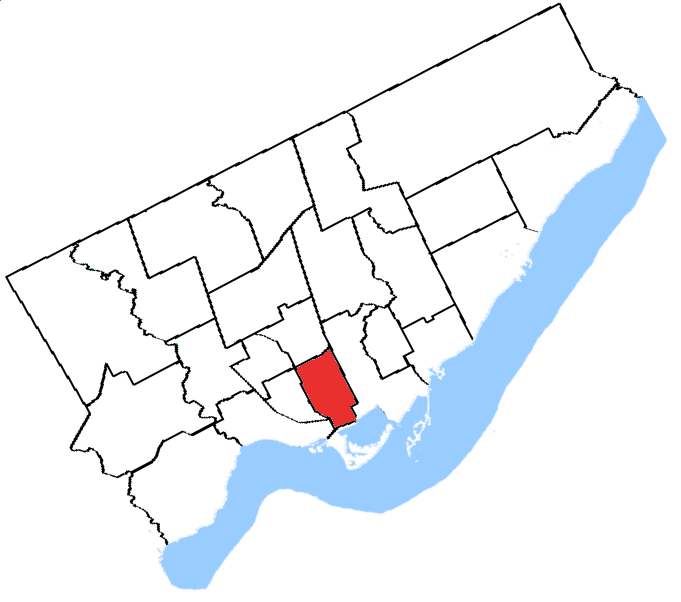
- Spadina's boundaries from 1976 to 1987

Defunct federal electoral district
- Legislature: House of Commons
- District created: 1933
- District abolished: 1988
- First contested: 1935
- Last contested: 1984

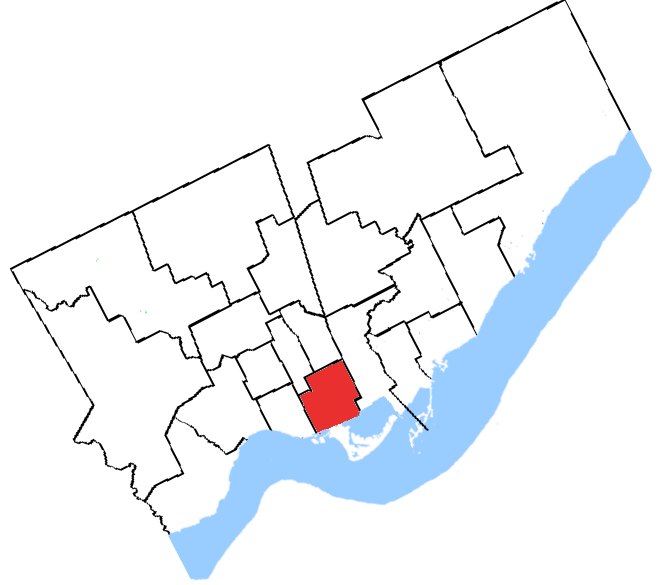
Spadina's boundaries from 1966 to 1976

Spadina was a federal electoral district represented in the House of Commons of Canada from 1935 to 1988. It covered a portion of the western-central Toronto, Ontario. The district name came from Spadina Avenue, which ran through the heart of the riding.

The electoral district was created through the 1933 Representation Act. This legislation was passed by the Parliament of Canada to readjust the representation of the House of Commons in response to the 1931 census results.

Spadina itself was built from portions of Toronto Northeast, Toronto Northwest, Toronto West Centre, and Toronto South. At the time, this meant it stretched to the very northern edges of the city. As this northern portion became more populated, boundaries changed and parts were split off into other ridings. The eastern and western boundaries remained more consistent, set from John Street in the east to Bathurst Street in the west.

By 1987, the population of downtown Toronto had decreased relative to other areas. As a result, Spadina was merged with Trinity to form Trinity—Spadina (along with other dicennial redistributions falling under the Electoral Boundaries Readjustment Act). Some portions merged into the eastern riding of Rosedale.

== Members of Parliament ==
This riding has elected the following members of Parliament:

Parliament	Years	Member	Party
Riding created from Toronto Northeast, Toronto Northwest, Toronto West Centre and Toronto South
18th	1935–1940	Samuel Factor	Liberal
19th	1940–1945	Samuel Factor	Liberal
20th	1945–1949	David Croll	Liberal
21st	1949–1953	David Croll	Liberal
22nd	1953–1955	David Croll	Liberal
22nd	1955–1957	Charles Edward Rea	Progressive Conservative
23rd	1957–1958	Charles Edward Rea	Progressive Conservative
24th	1958–1962	Charles Edward Rea	Progressive Conservative
25th	1962–1963	Sylvester Perry Ryan	Liberal
26th	1963–1965	Sylvester Perry Ryan	Liberal
27th	1965–1968	Sylvester Perry Ryan	Liberal
28th	1968–1969	Sylvester Perry Ryan	Liberal
28th	1969–1970	Sylvester Perry Ryan	Independent
28th	1970–1972	Sylvester Perry Ryan	Progressive Conservative
29th	1972–1974	Peter Stollery	Liberal
30th	1974–1979	Peter Stollery	Liberal
31st	1979–1980	Peter Stollery	Liberal
32nd	1980–1981	Peter Stollery	Liberal
32nd	1981–1984	Dan Heap	New Democratic
33rd	1984–1988	Dan Heap	New Democratic
Riding dissolved into Trinity—Spadina and Rosedale

== Election results ==
1935 Canadian federal election
Party	Candidate	Votes
Liberal	Samuel Factor	14,768
Conservative	Nathan Phillips	10,047
Communist	Joseph Salsberg	3,646
Reconstruction	D.A. Balfour	3,432
Co-operative Commonwealth	Jacob Romer	1,866

1940 Canadian federal election
Party	Candidate	Votes
Liberal	Samuel Factor	20,506
National Government	George Gooderham Blackstock	14,148
Communist	Stewart Smith	2,922

1945 Canadian federal election
Party	Candidate	Votes
Liberal	David Croll	17,978
Progressive Conservative	George Hees	10,846
Labor–Progressive	Sam Carr	10,050
Co-operative Commonwealth	Kay Montague Morris	2,769

1949 Canadian federal election
Party	Candidate	Votes
Liberal	David Croll	23,652
Progressive Conservative	Willard M. Box	9,407
Co-operative Commonwealth	William Andrew White	5,969

1953 Canadian federal election
Party	Candidate	Votes
Liberal	David Croll	15,496
Progressive Conservative	Averell Robinson	6,554
Co-operative Commonwealth	Elgin Ferguson Blair	3,270
Labor–Progressive	Joshua Gershman	1,938

By-election, after Croll was appointed to the Senate, 24 October 1955
Party	Candidate	Votes
Progressive Conservative	Charles E. Rea	6,740
Liberal	Samuel Godfrey	6,096
Labor–Progressive	Joseph Salsberg	3,894
Co-operative Commonwealth	Harry Waisglass	2,873

1957 Canadian federal election
Party	Candidate	Votes
Progressive Conservative	Charles E. Rea	10,348
Liberal	Philip Givens	9,496
Co-operative Commonwealth	Jack Kedzierzykowski	3,031
Labor–Progressive	Annie Buller Guralnick	668
Social Credit	Dorothy Cureatz	464

1958 Canadian federal election
Party	Candidate	Votes
Progressive Conservative	Charles E. Rea	14,616
Liberal	Philip G. Givens	10,596
Co-operative Commonwealth	Jack Kedzierzykowski	3,040
Labor–Progressive	Sam Walsh	652
Social Credit	Dorothy Cureatz	233

1962 Canadian federal election
Party	Candidate	Votes
Liberal	Perry Ryan	11,982
Progressive Conservative	John Bassett	9,088
New Democratic Party	Robert Beardsley	5,026
Independent	Stanley Taube	415
Social Credit	James Audy	227

1963 Canadian federal election
Party	Candidate	Votes
Liberal	Perry Ryan	14,850
Progressive Conservative	Frank Chambers	6,094
New Democratic Party	Robert Beardsley	5,888
Social Credit	Angelo Tomasini	332

1965 Canadian federal election
Party	Candidate	Votes
Liberal	Perry Ryan	12,005
New Democratic Party	Robert Beardsley	5,604
Progressive Conservative	Burt Richardson	5,337
New Capitalist	L. Ferris Kendall-Leicester	174

1968 Canadian federal election
Party	Candidate	Votes
Liberal	Perry Ryan	9,379
New Democratic Party	Dan Heap	3,943
Progressive Conservative	Victor Bagnato	3,353

1972 Canadian federal election
Party	Candidate	Votes
Liberal	Peter Stollery	8,334
New Democratic Party	Bob Beardsley	5,622
Progressive Conservative	Perry Ryan	5,616
No affiliation	Maggie Bizzell	226
No affiliation	Syd Stern	145
No affiliation	Mitchell Bornstein	114

1974 Canadian federal election
Party	Candidate	Votes
Liberal	Peter Stollery	9,393
Progressive Conservative	June Marks	3,989
New Democratic Party	Jack Shapiro	3,536
Communist	Maggie Bizzell	156
Marxist–Leninist	Maureen K. Cruise	96
Independent	Ann Noble	87
No affiliation	Mashel Teitelbaum	75

1979 Canadian federal election
Party	Candidate	Votes
Liberal	Peter Stollery	12,542
New Democratic Party	John Foster	8,765
Progressive Conservative	Alan Pope	7,213
Libertarian	Paul Wakfer	192
Communist	Mike Gidora	158
Marxist–Leninist	Barbara Seed	108
Independent	Ronald Rodgers	76

1980 Canadian federal election
Party	Candidate	Votes
Liberal	Peter Stollery	13,280
New Democratic Party	John Foster	8,232
Progressive Conservative	Eric Jackman	5,929
Rhinoceros	John Douglas	250
Libertarian	Don Redekop	227
Rhinoceros	Salvatore Pileggi	146
Communist	Mike Gidora	91
No affiliation	Nick Decarlo	77
No affiliation	Wayne Elliott	60
Marxist–Leninist	Barbara Seed	59
Independent	Ronald G. Rodgers	34

Canadian federal by-election, August 17, 1981 Appointment of Peter Stollery to the Senate
Party	Candidate	Votes
New Democratic	Dan Heap	7,586
Liberal	Jim Coutts	7,372
Progressive Conservative	Laura Sabia	6,581
Rhinoceros	Decriminalized Douglas	233
Libertarian	Robert Champlin	162
Independent	Anne McBride	84
Independent	John Turmel	69
Independent	Ronald Rodgers	41

1984 Canadian federal election
Party	Candidate	Votes
New Democratic	Dan Heap	13,241
Liberal	Jim Coutts	11,880
Progressive Conservative	Ying Hope	8,061
Libertarian	William E. Burt	358
Rhinoceros	Mara Maria Proussaefs	289
Independent	Sam Guha	98

== See also ==
- List of Canadian electoral districts
- Historical federal electoral districts of Canada
