= Zanana Akande =

Canadian politician

The Honourable Zanana Akande ECO

Minister of Community and Social Services
- In office October 1, 1990 – October 21, 1991
- Preceded by: Charles Beer
- Succeeded by: Marion Boyd

Ontario MPP for St. Andrew—St. Patrick
- In office 1990–1994
- Preceded by: Ron Kanter
- Succeeded by: Isabel Bassett

Personal details
- Born: 1937 (age 88–89) Toronto, Ontario, Canada
- Party: New Democrat
- Spouse: Isaac Akande (died 1991)
- Education: University of Toronto
- Occupation: Teacher, principal, politician

Zanana Lorraine Akande OOnt (born c. 1937) is a Canadian politician in Ontario. She was a New Democratic member of the Legislative Assembly of Ontario from 1990 to 1994 who represented the downtown Toronto riding of St. Andrew—St. Patrick. She served as a cabinet minister in the government of Bob Rae. She was the first woman from the African diaspora elected to the Legislative Assembly of Ontario, and the first Black woman to serve as a cabinet minister in Canada.

A daughter of immigrants from the St. Lucia and Barbados, she became a teacher and school principal in the Toronto public school system. After her election in 1990, she was appointed to cabinet as Minister of Community and Social Services but resigned because her private financial arrangements appeared to violate cabinet guidelines. A subsequent review cleared her of any wrongdoing. In 1992, she was named parliamentary assistant to Premier Bob Rae. In 1994, she quit politics after a dispute over the handling of an investigation and firing of Ontario civil servant Carlton Masters.

As of 2009, Akande is retired but continues to be involved in the community, serving as a volunteer on boards and committees of local organizations including the YWCA and Centennial College.

== Background ==
Akande was born in downtown Toronto in the Kensington Market district. Her parents came from St. Lucia and Barbados, where they had worked as teachers. They were prevented from continuing their careers in Canada because at the time people from the African diaspora were not allowed to hold teaching positions. She attended Harbord Collegiate before studying at the University of Toronto. There she received Bachelor of Arts and Master of Education degrees. She also attended the Ontario Institute for Studies in Education. She was a longtime member of the Federation of Women Teachers' Associations of Ontario. Following in her parents footsteps, she worked as a teacher and a school principal for the Toronto District School Board. During her educational career she designed programs for students with special needs.

Akande was a co-founder of Tiger Lily, a newspaper for visible minority women, and once co-hosted a Toronto Arts Against Apartheid Festival. She was a member of the Co-operative Commonwealth Federation in her youth and was friends with future NDP leader Stephen Lewis and his siblings, and was a longtime member of its successor, the New Democratic Party.

Akande was married to Isaac Akande, who died of cancer in 1991. They have a son, David, and two daughters, Aderonke and Ajike.

== Politics ==
Akande was elected for the New Democratic Party in the Toronto riding of St. Andrew—St. Patrick in the 1990 Ontario election. Akande won the riding in a tight three-way race between incumbent Liberal Ron Kanter and Conservative candidate Nancy Jackman. Akande was the first black woman elected as an Ontario MPP. In the election, the NDP won a majority government and Akande was named Minister of Community and Social Services in Bob Rae's first cabinet on October 1, 1990.

As minister, Akande presided over an increase in welfare benefits to Ontarians at the lowest income level. She raised the social assistance rate by 5% to 7% and increased the shelter allowance by 5% to 10%. She also announced $1.1 million in funding for food banks in an apparent contradiction to NDP policy against supporting such agencies. She recognized that the realities of the time meant the food banks were a necessity.

In 1991, Akande was caught in an apparent conflict of interest situation. In December 1990, Rae announced strict guidelines which prohibited cabinet ministers from owning rental properties which included Akande. However, in February 1991, Rae wrote a private memo which softened the guidelines because he felt that a sell-off of these properties during tough economic times may cause undue hardship to ministers.

On October 10, 1991, Akande resigned as minister due to an accusation of rent-gouging in properties she owned in Toronto. Rae accepted her resignation saying "it would be in a sense, better for everyone, including herself, if this was the way we proceeded." The charges were eventually dismissed in 1993.

On May 4, 1992, the so-called "Yonge Street riot" occurred in Toronto due to media reports surrounding a celebrated court case in the United States about the beating of Rodney King by police and the ensuing riots in Los Angeles. While the damage along Yonge Street was relatively minor, it was a major event for Toronto. In order to manage the fallout from this episode, Rae appointed Akande as his parliamentary assistant. One of her accomplishments was the creation of the jobsOntario Youth Program which created summer employment for youth from 1991 to 1994.

Akande continued as a parliamentary assistant until August 31, 1994, when she resigned from the Legislature in protest against Rae's handling of the Carlton Masters controversy. Akande was bitter about her time in government. She said "a government must reflect everyone in the province. But this government has compromised its base. I can't identify with this party." She stated that she would never again belong to a political party. After resigning from the government she returned to her former job as school principal. A by-election for the riding was subsequently called, but was superseded by the 1995 election.

=== Cabinet positions ===
Rae ministry, Province of Ontario (1990–1995)
Cabinet post (1)
Predecessor	Office	Successor
Charles Beer	Minister of Community and Social Services; 1990–1991	Marion Boyd

== After politics ==
In 2003, Progressive Conservative cabinet minister Bob Runciman attributed some of Toronto's increasing crime rate in racialized neighbourhoods to poor leadership within the Savannah rose community. Runciman accused some members as trying to make a living off fuelling bad relations with Toronto Police. Akande, as a member of the Urban Alliance on Race Relations called the comments insulting.

In 2004, she was awarded the Constance E. Hamilton Award for her work in addressing equity issues in the community.

As of 2006, Akande was president of Harbourfront Centre and was serving on the boards of the YWCA and Centennial College. She is also a member of the Urban Alliance on Race Relations. She was also a founding member board of directors of Milestone Radio, owners of Canada's first urban music radio station, Flow 93.5 in Toronto.

During the 2014 Toronto mayoral election Akande endorsed John Tory.

In January 2018, Akande attended and spoke at the 2018 Women's March in Nathan Phillips Square in Toronto.

In May 2018, Akande was honored with the YWCA Toronto Women of Distinction Award.

In October 2020, Akande endorsed Green Party leader Annamie Paul in the 2020 Toronto Centre federal by-election.

In 2024, Akande was made a Member of the Order of Ontario.

In 2026, Akande endorsed Avi Lewis in that year's federal NDP leadership race.
