= Frederick Fraser Hunter =

Canadian politician from Ontario

Member of the Ontario Provincial Parliament for St. Patrick
- In office June 19, 1934 – June 30, 1943
- Preceded by: Edward Joseph Murphy
- Succeeded by: Kelso Roberts

Personal details
- Born: 1876 Durham, Ontario
- Died: 1959 (aged 82–83) Durham, Ontario
- Party: Liberal

Frederick Fraser Hunter (1876 – 1959) was a Canadian politician who was Liberal MPP for St. Patrick from 1934 to 1940.

Hunter served in the British Army during the First World War.

== See also ==
- 19th Parliament of Ontario
- 20th Parliament of Ontario
