= Arthur Denis =

Canadian politician

J-Arthur Denis

Member of the Canadian Parliament for St. Denis
- In office December 1921 – October 1934
- Preceded by: Alphonse Verville
- Succeeded by: Azellus Denis

Personal details
- Born: Joseph-Arthur Denis; 26 April 1881 Saint-Norbert, Quebec, Canada
- Died: 1 October 1934 (aged 53) Lac-Rouge, Quebec, Canada
- Party: Liberal
- Spouse(s): Ottawa Gagnon m. 26 June 1907
- Profession: physician

Joseph-Arthur Denis (26 April 1881 – 1 October 1934) was a Liberal party member of the House of Commons of Canada.

== Biography ==
He was born in Saint-Norbert, Quebec in Berthier County and became a physician.The son of Arsène Denis and Georgiana Laporte, Denis attended Joliette College, then Université Laval. He practised medicine at Notre-Dame-des-Bois and Montreal.

He was first elected to Parliament at the St. Denis riding in the 1921 general election then re-elected in 1925, 1926 and 1930. Denis died on 1 October 1934 before he was able to complete his fourth term, the 17th Canadian Parliament. His brother Azellus succeeded him as member for St. Denis.
