= Azellus Denis =

Canadian politician

The Honourable Azellus Denis PC QC
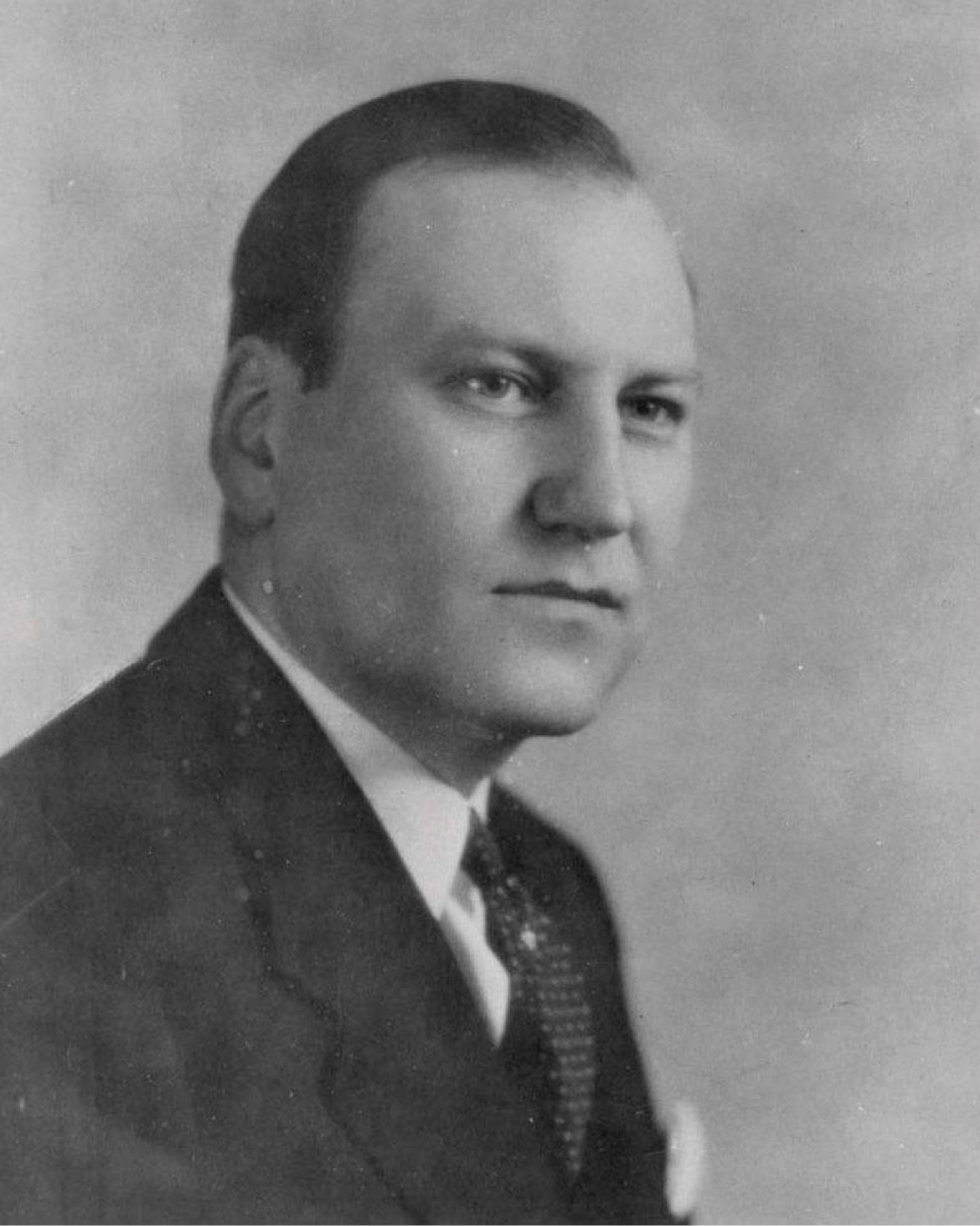

Senator for La Salle, Quebec
- In office February 3, 1964 – September 4, 1991
- Appointed by: Lester B. Pearson
- Preceded by: Mark Robert Drouin
- Succeeded by: Marcel Prud'homme

Member of the Canadian Parliament for St. Denis
- In office 1935–1964
- Preceded by: Joseph-Arthur Denis
- Succeeded by: Marcel Prud'homme

Personal details
- Born: March 26, 1907 Saint-Norbert, Quebec, Canada
- Died: September 4, 1991 (aged 84)
- Resting place: Notre Dame des Neiges Cemetery
- Party: Liberal
- Spouse: Émérencienne Fleury-Bissonnette
- Relations: Joseph-Arthur Denis, brother
- Cabinet: Postmaster General (1963-1964)

Azellus Denis, PC QC (March 26, 1907 – September 4, 1991) was a Canadian politician who served in the Parliament of Canada as a Member of Parliament and Senator for the longest period of time, 55 years, 10 months and 20 days.

== Biography ==
Born in Saint-Norbert, Quebec, the son of Arsène Denis and Georgiana Laporte, he was educated in Saint-Norbert, Joliette and at the Université de Montréal. Denis practised law in Montreal. In 1945, he married Émérencienne Fleury-Bissonnette.

He was first elected as a Liberal Member of Parliament in the riding of St. Denis in 1935. His brother Arthur had represented the St. Denis riding in the House of Commons until his death in 1934. Denis was re-elected in 1940, 1945, 1949, 1953, 1957, 1958, 1962, and 1963. He was the Postmaster General from 1963 until the Post Office patronage scandal of 1964. In the midst of the scandal, he was appointed to the Senate at the recommendation of Prime Minister Lester B. Pearson and served until his death in 1991.

He was a reservist in the 2nd Battalion (Reserve) Châteauguay Regiment.

After his death in 1991, he was entombed at the Notre Dame des Neiges Cemetery in Montreal. Parc Azellus-Denis in Montreal is named in his honour.
