= Toronto West Centre =

Former federal electoral district in Ontario, Canada

Ontario electoral district

Defunct federal electoral district
- Legislature: House of Commons
- District created: 1924
- District abolished: 1933
- First contested: 1925
- Last contested: 1930

Toronto West Centre was a federal electoral district represented in the House of Commons of Canada from 1925 to 1935. It was located in the province of Ontario. This riding was created in 1924 from parts of Toronto Centre and Toronto West ridings.

It consisted of the part of the city of Toronto bounded on the north by Bloor Street, on the west by Dovercourt Road, on the south by Dundas Street, and on the east by Avenue Road, Queen's Park Crescent and University Avenue.

The electoral district was abolished in 1933 when it was redistributed between Spadina, St. Paul's and Trinity ridings.

== Members of Parliament ==
This riding has elected the following members of Parliament:

Parliament	Years	Member	Party
Riding created from Toronto Centre and Toronto West
15th	1925–1926	Horatio Clarence Hocken	Conservative
16th	1926–1930	Horatio Clarence Hocken	Conservative
17th	1930–1935	Samuel Factor	Liberal
Riding dissolved into Spadina, St. Paul's and Trinity

== Election history ==
1925 Canadian federal election: Toronto West Centre
Party	Candidate	Votes	%	±%
Conservative	Horatio Clarence Hocken	10,514		
Liberal	Joseph Singer	7,495		
Independent	Francis Herbert Murphy	247		

1926 Canadian federal election: Toronto West Centre
Party	Candidate	Votes	%	±%
Conservative	Horatio Clarence Hocken	7,956		
Liberal	Frederick Graham Johnston	5,388		
Labour	John MacDonald	1,193		

1930 Canadian federal election: Toronto West Centre
Party	Candidate	Votes	%	±%
Liberal	Samuel Factor	8,367		
Conservative	Thomas Langton Church	7,803		
Communist	Charles Sims	621		
Labour	James McArthur Conner	264		

== See also ==
- List of Canadian electoral districts
- Historical federal electoral districts of Canada
