= Ron Graham (author) =

Canadian author and journalist

Ron Graham is a Canadian author and journalist.

== Career ==
=== Journalism ===
Graham joined CBC TV in 1977 and became associate producer of the award-winning documentary series, The Canadian Establishment, a six-hour examination of Canadian business that aired in the fall of 1980.

Between 1982 and 1988 he was a regular contributor and associate editor with Saturday Night magazine in Toronto. Robert Fulford, its editor, called him "our best discovery of the 1980s." His profiles of Jean Chrétien, John Turner, and Emmett Cardinal Carter won National Magazine Awards.

After 1988 Graham worked as a freelance writer and journalist, a book editor and speechwriter, a university lecturer, and the curator of a museum exhibition. His writings have appeared in The Globe and Mail, the New York Times, Toronto Life, Report on Business magazine, Canadian Art, Literary Review of Canada, among other periodicals, and he has frequently participated as a political and social commentator on Canadian radio, television, and podcasts. His later magazine work included profiles of Prime Minister Kim Campbell, Liberal leader Michael Ignatieff, and Prime Minister Stephen Harper.

=== Books ===
In 1986, Graham published One-Eyed Kings, a narrative account of Canadian politics in the first half of the 1980s. Its paperback edition won the Author's Award for the outstanding non-fiction book. In 2011 it was shortlisted by the Writers Trust/Samara Foundation as the best Canadian political book of the last twenty-five years.

In 1990, he published God's Dominion, a portrait of religion in Canada in the 1980s, which was nominated for a Governor General's literary award in non-fiction and became a four-hour CBC-TV documentary series. It was also the object of a libel case initiated by financier Conrad Black, who took exception to a single sentence that he claimed accused him of causing human misery. The case was settled out of court with a public clarification.

The French Quarter: The Epic Struggle of a Family – and a Nation – Divided, published in 1993, was a best-selling family memoir of the history and politics of French Canada.All the King's Horses, published in 1995, was an account of Canadian politics in the 1990s.

In 2011 he published The Last Act: Pierre Trudeau, the Gang of Eight, and the Fight for Canada, (2011), an account of Canada's constitutional battles leading up to patriation and the charter of rights in 1982. It was shortlisted for the Shaughnessy Cohen Prize for Political Writing.

Graham edited several books, including Straight from the Heart and My Years as Prime Minister, the memoirs of Rt. Hon. Jean Chrétien; The Essential Trudeau, with Rt. Hon. Pierre Elliott Trudeau; Behind the Embassy Door, by Governor James Blanchard, the former US ambassador to Canada; and The Call of the World, by Bill Graham, former minister of foreign affairs and national defence. He also served as the English-language interviewer for the television memoirs of Pierre Elliott Trudeau and, in 2025, edited, with commentary, The Coutts Diaries, based on the political diaries of Trudeau's principal secretary, Jim Coutts.

=== Other work ===
In 2019 Graham curated an exhibition and edited a book on Sir William Van Horne's Japanese ceramics collection, Obsession, at the Gardiner Museum (Toronto) and the Montreal Museum of Fine Arts. In 2025 he published The Informal Imperialist: Dr. Clement Williams at the Court of King Mindon, Mandalay, 1861-1879, with River Books, Bangkok.

Graham was the president of PEN Canada and held the Maclean Hunter Chair of Communications Ethics at Ryerson University. He was appointed a trustee of the Royal Ontario Museum and chaired its innovative Institute for Contemporary Culture. He has also served on the boards of the Canadian Art Foundation, the Ontario Vipassana Foundation, and the Pierre Elliott Trudeau Foundation.

== Personal life ==
Born in Ottawa, Ontario, Graham grew up in Montreal, graduated from Bishop's College School, and received a Bachelor of Arts from McGill University in 1968 and an Masters of Arts from the Institute of Canadian Studies at Carleton University, Ottawa in 1971.

He is the brother of businessman Anthony Graham and a nephew of Lt. Gen. Robert Moncel and Hon. Bill Graham.

Graham lives in Toronto and is married to arts journalist Gillian MacKay. They have three children.

== List of works ==
- One-Eyed Kings: Promise & illusion in Canadian politics (1986)
- The French Quarter: The Epic Struggle of a Family – and a Nation – Divided (1993)
- All the King's Horses (1995)
- The Last Act: Pierre Trudeau, the Gang of Eight, and the Fight for Canada (2011)
- The Coutts Diaries (2025)
- The Informal Imperialist (2025)
