= Marcel Prud'homme =

Canadian politician

The Honourable Marcel Prud'homme PC

Senator for La Salle, Quebec
- In office 1993–2009
- Appointed by: Brian Mulroney
- Preceded by: Azellus Denis
- Succeeded by: Pierre-Hugues Boisvenu

Member of the Canadian Parliament for Saint-Denis
- In office 1964–1993
- Preceded by: Azellus Denis
- Succeeded by: Eleni Bakopanos

Personal details
- Born: November 30, 1934 Montreal, Quebec, Canada
- Died: January 25, 2017 (aged 82) Ottawa, Ontario, Canada
- Party: Liberal (1964-1993); Independent (1993-2009)

Marcel Prud'homme, PC (November 30, 1934 – January 25, 2017) was a Canadian politician who served as a member of the Senate and the House of Commons of Canada.

== Early life ==
Prud'homme was born in Montreal the youngest of Dr. Hector Prud'homme and the former Lucia Paquette's 12 children. Dr. Prud'homme also served as a city councillor which gave the younger Prud'homme exposure to politics.

He completed a BA in social sciences, economics and politics at the University of Ottawa in 1959, then studying law at the University of Montreal.

== Political career ==
Prud'homme was elected president of both the Young Liberals of Canada and president of the Student Federation of the University of Ottawa in 1958. He became lifelong friends with Brian Mulroney as a result of debating him at model parliaments and student conferences. As prime minister, Mulroney would later elevate Prud'homme to the Queen's Privy Council for Canada and the Senate of Canada.

He almost entered Quebec provincial politics in the 1960 provincial election being offered the Quebec Liberal Party's nomination in Montreal-Laurier, only to be asked to step aside at the last minute for star candidate René Lévesque.

Prud'homme was first elected to the House of Commons in a 1964 by-election as Liberal MP for Saint-Denis, Quebec. He was subsequently re-elected eight times.

He served as Parliamentary Secretary from 1971 to 1974 to the Minister of Manpower and Immigration, Secretary of State for Canada, and to the Minister of Regional Economic Expansion successively.

For most of his career, however, Prud'homme was a backbencher. He was particularly outspoken in his support for Palestinian causes and in his opposition to Zionism and this may have hindered the prospects of his serving in the Canadian Cabinet. In 1989, while in Opposition, he became the Liberal Party's Critic for Arms Control and Disarmament. In 1992, he became Chair of the Quebec Liberal Caucus. On July 1, 1992, Prud'homme was appointed to the Queen's Privy Council for Canada in honour of his longstanding personal friendship with then-Prime Minister Brian Mulroney.

In 1993, Progressive Conservative Prime Minister Brian Mulroney appointed Prud'homme to the Canadian Senate where he took his seat as an independent. The Liberals saw this move as an attempt to provide a non-partisan cover to various patronage appointments Mulroney made at the end of his term as prime minister.

He resigned in 2009 at 75 as the law required.

== Death ==
Prud'homme, who had suffered from heart and kidney ailments for several years, died in Ottawa, Ontario on January 25, 2017, aged 82, due to complications after a fall.

== Honours ==
In 2007, he was awarded the Order of Friendship of Russia. Prud'homme was also awarded honours by Morocco, Cuba and Hungary and was granted an honorary doctorate by the University of Algiers as well as five Canadian commemorative medals.
