= Sylvester Perry Ryan =

Canadian politician

- Official 1968 portrait

Member of the Canadian Parliament for Spadina
- In office 1962–1972
- Preceded by: Charles Edward Rea
- Succeeded by: Peter Stollery

Personal details
- Born: January 12, 1918 Toronto, Ontario, Canada
- Died: October 23, 2001 (aged 83)
- Party: Liberal (1962-1968); Independent (1969); Progressive Conservative (1970-1972)
- Committees: Vice-Chair, Standing Committee on External Affairs and National Defence (1968-1970); Co-chair, Special Joint Committee on the National and Royal Anthems (1967-1968)

Sylvester Perry Ryan (January 12, 1918 – October 23, 2001) was a Canadian lawyer and politician.

Ryan's federal political career began in 1949 when he ran, twice, for the Toronto seat of Greenwood. Running as a Liberal he was defeated by Progressive Conservative John Ernest McMillin in the 1949 federal election and then, in the by-election called following McMillin's death, was defeated by James MacKerras MacDonnell by less than 200 votes.

In 1962, Ryan made another attempt to gain a seat in the House of Commons of Canada, this time for the Toronto riding of Spadina in which he succeeded in defeating prominent Tory publisher John W. H. Bassett.

Ryan was re-elected as a Liberal under leader Lester B. Pearson in 1963 and 1965 and under Pierre Trudeau in 1968. Uncomfortable with Trudeau's policies, Ryan left the Liberal Party and crossed the floor on December 3, 1969 to sit as an Independent MP. In September 1970 he joined the Progressive Conservative caucus. Ryan cited three reasons for leaving the Liberals - the Trudeau government's downgrading of Canada's relationship with NATO, the government's decision to recognize the People's Republic of China and what Ryan argued was the downgrading of the status and influence of backbench MPs and ordinary Members of Parliament under Trudeau.

Attempting to retain his seat in the 1972 federal election Ryan ran as a Progressive Conservative candidate but finished in third place behind Liberal Peter Stollery and Bob Beardsley of the New Democratic Party.

== Archives ==
There is a Sylvester Perry Ryan fonds at Library and Archives Canada. Archival reference number is R3822.
