= Charles Edward Rea =

Canadian politician

Member of the Canadian Parliament for Spadina
- In office 1955–1962
- Preceded by: David Croll
- Succeeded by: Sylvester Perry Ryan

Member of the Legislative Assembly of Ontario for St. Patrick
- In office 1948–1951
- Preceded by: Kelso Roberts
- Succeeded by: Kelso Roberts

Personal details
- Born: October 29, 1902 Brandon, Manitoba
- Died: August 31, 1965 (aged 62)
- Party: Progressive Conservative

Charles Edward Rea (October 29, 1902 – August 31, 1965) was an Ontario insurance agent and political figure. He represented St. Patrick in the Legislative Assembly of Ontario from 1948 to 1951 and Spadina in the House of Commons of Canada from 1955 to 1962 as a Progressive Conservative member.

He was born in Brandon, Manitoba. Rea served on the town council for New Liskeard from 1932 to 1938.
