= June Marks =

Canadian politician and community activist

(Florence) June Marks, née Pacey (1923–2008) was a Toronto community activist and politician.

She first ran for city council in 1962 in Ward 2 but was defeated. She was elected on her second attempt in 1964 and, in 1966, won citywide election to the Toronto Board of Control and also served on Metro Toronto Council. When the Board of Control was abolished for the 1969 election she ran and won in Ward 6. She was defeated in the 1972 municipal election. She ran federally for the Progressive Conservatives in Spadina in the 1974 federal election but was defeated.

Marks was an advocate for improved housing in the downtown core and initiated a judicial probe into slum conditions in Toronto that resulted in more rigorous housing inspections.
