= Ying Hope =

Canadian politician (1923–2007)

Personal details
- Born: 1923
- Died: November 12, 2007 (aged 83–84)
- Education: University of Washington

Chinese name
- Traditional Chinese: 劉光英
- Simplified Chinese: 刘光英
- Hanyu Pinyin: Liú Guāngyīng
- Yale Romanization: Làuh Gwōngyīng

Ying L.K. Hope P. Eng. (1923 – November 12, 2007) was a Chinese Canadian politician, Toronto Public School Board trustee and Metro Toronto Councillor and Toronto Alderman.

Hope's grandparents, great uncles and aunts emigrated from China to Victoria, British Columbia in the 1880s as part of a wave of Chinese immigrants working on the railway and in mines. His father and uncle established "Wo Hope Tailoring" ("peace and unity" in Chinese). Though the family's surname was Low, it was assumed by the doctor delivering Hope's eldest brother that the family surname was Hope so it is that name that was put on all of his siblings birth certificates, and his.

He left Canada in 1946 to study engineering at the University of Washington, earned his degree, and settled in Toronto. He was elected as a trustee to the Toronto Board of Education in 1964 and elected chair in 1968. He was elected an alderman on Toronto City Council in the 1969 municipal election representing Ward 5. He remained on council until he was defeated in the 1985 municipal election by Ron Kanter. He won a seat as a Metro Councillor representing Midtown Ward in a 1987 by-election but was defeated the next year, in the 1988 election, by Ila Bossons. He attempted to return to council again in the 1991 election but was defeated by John Adams in Ward 13 by a narrow margin of 747 votes.

Hope also ran for office at other levels. In the 1967 provincial election he was the Ontario Progressive Conservative candidate in Riverdale placing second to James Renwick of the Ontario New Democratic Party. Decades later he ran for a seat in the House of Commons of Canada in the 1984 federal election as a Progressive Conservative but placed third in the riding of Spadina which included the Ward 5 Toronto seat he represented on city council.

After leaving politics, Hope continued his activity with the Chinese community as an advocate for reparations for the Chinese head tax. He worked as a consultant for Environment Canada's "green plan" in the early 1990s and pursued a career as a real estate agent.

Hope died at Sunnybrook Health Sciences Centre in Toronto on November 12, 2007. He was survived by his second wife Audrey and children Judy, Michael, and Madeline, from his first marriage to Alice Hope.

== Electoral record (partial) ==
1980 Toronto municipal election: Toronto City Councillor, Ward Five (two members elected)
Candidate	Votes	%
(x)Ying Hope	9,926	37.07
Ron Kanter	6,409	23.93
Menno Verster	5,777	21.57
David Scott	3,218	12.02
Jimmy Kabitsis	912	3.41
Vincent Corriero	537	2.01
Total valid votes	26,779	100.00

146 out of 148 polls reporting.

1984 Canadian federal election: Spadina
Party	Candidate	Votes
New Democratic	Dan Heap	13,241
Liberal	Jim Coutts	11,880
Progressive Conservative	Ying Hope	8,061
Libertarian	William E. Burt	358
Rhinoceros	Mara Maria Proussaefs	289
Independent	Sam Guha	98

Preceded by N/A	Toronto Public School Trustee - Ward 5; 1963–1969	Succeeded by ?
Preceded by N/A	Toronto Public School Board Chair - Ward 5; 1968–1969	Succeeded by ?
Political offices
Preceded by ?	Toronto Alderman for Ward 5; 1969–1985	Succeeded by Ron Kanter
Preceded by ?	Metro Toronto Councillor - Mid-Town; 1987–1988	Succeeded by Ila Bossons
