= Member of Provincial Parliament (Canada) =

Elected member of the Legislative Assembly of the Canadian province of Ontario

Member of Provincial Parliament Député provincial
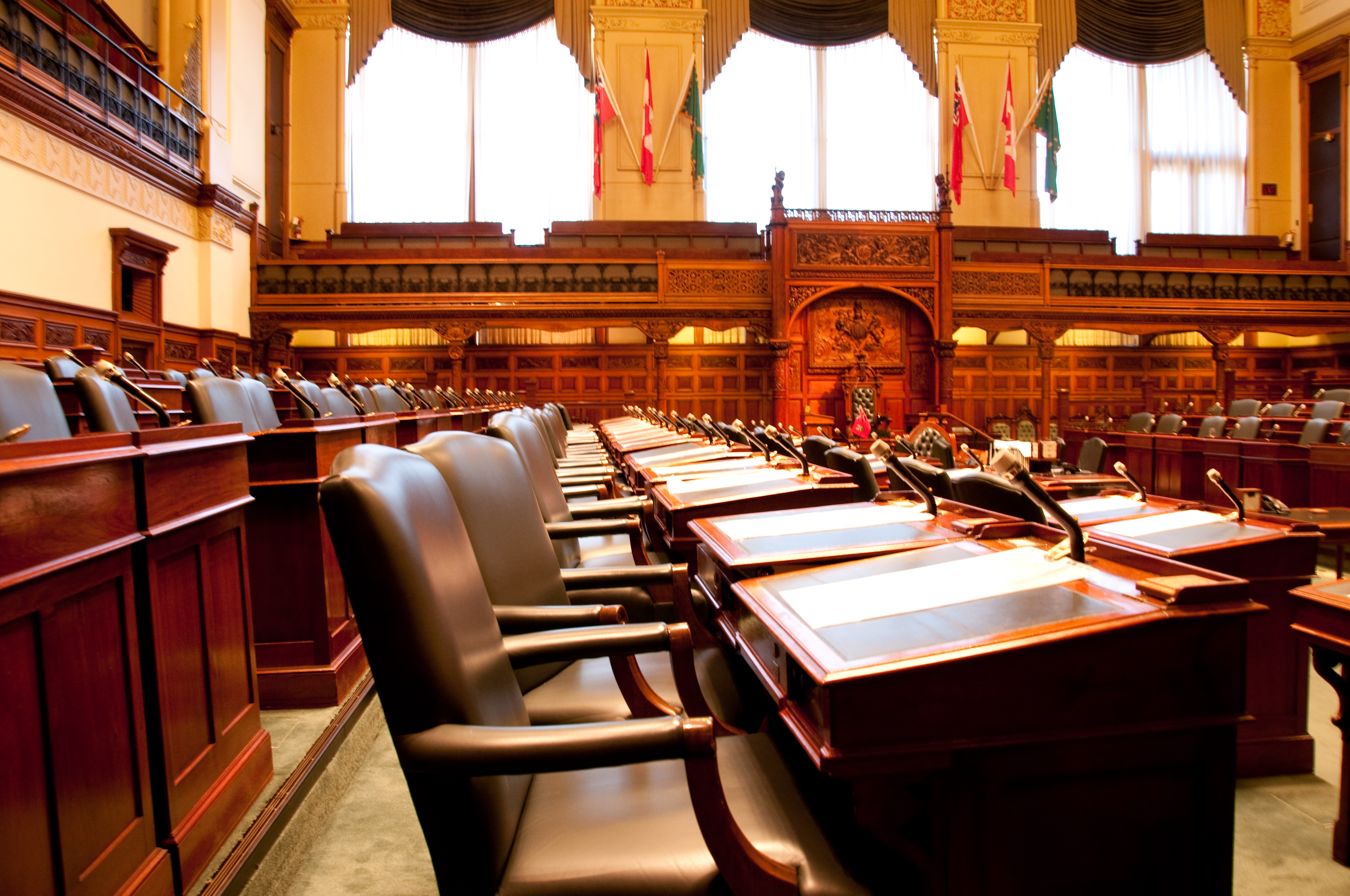
- Ontario MPPs meet in the Legislative Building located in Queen's Park, Toronto

Occupation
- Occupation type: Politician
- Activity sectors: Politics; government

Description
- Competencies: Law; public speaking; decision-making; budgeting; communications
- Related jobs: Senator; government minister; member of Parliament; member of the Legislative Assembly; city councillor

Member of Provincial Parliament (post-nominal letters: MPP; French: député provincial) is the title used by members of the Legislative Assembly of Ontario, a provincial legislature in Canada. Historically, the title has also been used by members of the Legislative Assembly of Lower Canada from 1791 to 1838 and members of the Legislative Assembly of Quebec from 1955 to 1968.

== Ontario ==
The titular designation "Member of Provincial Parliament" and the initialism "MPP" were formally adopted by the Ontario legislature on April 7, 1938. Before the adoption of this resolution, members had no fixed designation. Prior to Confederation in 1867, members of the Legislative Assembly of the Province of Canada had been known by various titles, including MPP, MLA and MHA. This confusion persisted after 1867, with members of the Ontario legislature using the title Member of the Legislative Assembly (MLA) or Member of Provincial Parliament (MPP) interchangeably.

In 1938, Frederick Fraser Hunter, the member for St. Patrick, introduced a private member's bill to designate members with the title Member of Parliament (MP), arguing that the titles of MPP or MLA were confusing, inaccurate, and undignified. However, his proposal failed to pass. As an alternative, a resolution was adopted fixing the title as Member of Provincial Parliament (MPP).

The text of the resolution passed by the House on that day is as follows:

On motion of Mr. Hunter, seconded by Mr. Miller,

Resolved, That in all matters of address, titular distinction, formal correspondence, official proceedings and all similar matters having to do with and coming under the jurisdiction of the Legislature of Ontario, the members of the Legislative Assembly shall be entitled to the designation "Member of Provincial Parliament" and its abbreviation "M.P.P."

== Quebec ==
In Quebec, a bill to adopt the titular designation "Member of Provincial Parliament" (French: membre du Parlement provincial) and the initialism "MPP" (French: M.P.P.) was assented on December 15, 1955. Like in Ontario, members had no fixed designation prior to this bill's adoption, although they were usually referred to as "Members of the Legislative Assembly" (MLAs) (French: membres de l'Assemblée législative (MALs).

The bill to change the titular designation was supported by Quebec premier Maurice Duplessis, who gave a speech in support of it in the legislative assembly. The reasons he gave for this change were the following:

1. The French acronym for "Member of the Legislative Assembly" (M.A.L.) can sometimes be pronounced as "mal", which means "bad" or "evil" in French.
2. Quebec's legislature has all the fiscal and constitutional prerogatives to be considered a "Parliament", and the new designation would better reflect that.
3. The new designation would be a return to the original designation used before confederation.
4. The acronym MPP is the same in French and in English.

The designation was changed again in 1968 when the National Assembly of Quebec was renamed. The member's titular designation was "Member of the Quebec Parliament" (MQP, or membre du Parlement du Québec (M.P.Q.) from 1968 to 1971, then "Member of the National Assembly" (MNA, or membres de l'Assemblée Nationale (M.A.N.) from 1971 to 1982. The designation "Member of the National Assembly" is still used in English, but the French titular designation was abolished, and MNAs are now simply referred to as "député", the same title used for federal members of Parliament and for the members of other provincial assemblies.

== Other designations ==
Ontario is currently the only Canadian provincial legislative assembly to employ this designation. Members of other Canadian provincial and territorial assemblies employ the titles:

- "Member of the National Assembly" (MNA) in Quebec,
- "Member of the House of Assembly" (MHA) in Newfoundland and Labrador
- "Member of the Legislative Assembly" (MLA) in all other provinces and territories.

== See also ==
- Legislative assemblies of Canadian provinces and territories
- Member of Provincial Parliament (Western Cape)
- Member of Parliament (Canada)
