= Albert Edward Smith =

Canadian politician (1871–1947)

Albert E. Smith

Member of the Legislative Assembly of Manitoba for Brandon
- In office June 29, 1920 – July 18, 1922
- Preceded by: Stephen Emmett Clement
- Succeeded by: John Edmison

Personal details
- Born: October 20, 1871 Guelph, Ontario, Canada
- Died: April 12, 1946 (aged 74) Toronto, Ontario, Canada
- Party: Communist Party of Canada; Labor-Progressive Party; Dominion Labour; Canadian Labour Party
- Spouse: Maude Mercy Rogers
- Children: Stewart Smith

Albert Edward Smith (October 20, 1871 – April 12, 1947), known as A. E. Smith, was a Canadian religious leader and politician. A social gospeller, Smith was for many years a minister in the Canadian Methodist Church before starting his own "People's Church". He served in the Legislative Assembly of Manitoba from 1920 to 1922 as a Labour representative. He joined the Communist Party of Canada in 1925 and ran as a Communist candidate in several elections.

== Early life ==
Smith was born on October 20, 1871, in Guelph, Ontario, the son of William George Smith and Elizabeth Bildson, working-class immigrants from England. He worked as a machinist's apprentice and later a bookbinder to contribute to the family's income. His family later moved to Hamilton, where he developed an interest in religion after joining the Gore Street Methodist Church. After passing an oral examination, he became a lay preacher in 1888. In 1890 Smith was transferred to MacGregor, Manitoba, to begin field work. His appointment came from James Woodsworth, superintendent of Methodist missions for western Canada and father of J. S. Woodsworth.

Smith was a vocal supporter of Thomas Greenway's Liberal government in Manitoba during the 1890s. During the Manitoba Schools Question, he defended the Greenway government's decision to remove funding from French-language denominational schools.

== Ordination ==
After three years' work as a probationer, Smith enrolled as a student for the ministry at Wesley College in Winnipeg in 1893. He was formally ordained to the ministry in 1897. He married Maude Mercy Rogers in 1898, with whom he would have seven children. After working in Dauphin, Manitoba, and Prince Albert, Saskatchewan, Smith was stationed at the MacDougall Memorial Methodist Church in north-end Winnipeg in 1902.

== Left-wing politics ==
Smith's political views now turned to labour, and he spoke in support of Labour MP Arthur Puttee's re-election in the 1904 federal election.

Smith left Winnipeg in 1906, and moved to Portage la Prairie. In 1910, he accepted ministerial work in Nelson, British Columbia. He spoke at Socialist Party gatherings, and became acquainted with Jack Johnstone, later a leading figure in the Communist Party of the United States. Smith returned to Manitoba in 1913, to accept a position as minister of the wealthy First Methodist Church in Brandon.

Smith was an advocate of church union with the Presbyterians throughout the 1910s. In 1925, this union came about via the creation of the United Church of Canada.

Smith was asked to consider running in the 1917 federal election as a supporter of Robert Borden's Union government of pro-conscription Liberals and Conservatives. Although he rejected these requests, Smith's name was put forward for the Unionist nomination in Brandon. Borden's government was supported by both mainstream labour and the Methodist Church, and some local government supporters believed Smith's name would aid their cause. Asked to make a speech at the nomination meeting, he informed the delegates that he had no confidence in either of the older parties, and did not believe the Union arrangement would make any difference. To the surprise of none present, Smith did not receive the nomination.

== Socialist politics ==
In 1917, Smith read The Communist Manifesto for the first time. He later claimed that the work was "like a revelation". Smith's religious views were, by his own admission, unorthodox for the standards of his age: he believed that the message of Jesus was "the proclamation of a new social order of human society", and rejected the "harsh theologies" of mainstream Christian churches. "In my sermons", he wrote, "no miracle was required to explain the birth of Jesus or his life and teachings ... His name was to be cherished because He died as a leader of the people, for His principles and in protest against the unjust rulers of His day". After reading The Communist Manifesto, Smith eventually reached the conclusion that Jesus was a communist.

Smith's views had not yet developed to this stage in 1917, however, and he joined the social reformist Dominion Labour Party at the end of the First World War. Smith supported the strikers from his pulpit during the Winnipeg General Strike of 1919 and opened his church to Brandon civic workers who voted for a parallel strike in their city. As a member of the Brandon Trades and Labour Council, Smith provided extensive logistical support to Brandon's strike committee. He also testified before the Royal Commission on Industrial Relations.

Not surprisingly, Smith's labour activities were opposed by more conservative figures in his Methodist church. At a special meeting of the church board held on May 26, 1919, a prominent church member moved that Smith "be restrained from any further preaching in First Church". No formal charges were made against him, and the motion was withdrawn. Nonetheless, his role as Brandon's Methodist minister had become untenable. On June 8, he announced the formation of a new People's Church in the city.

== People's Church ==
On June 22 the first meeting of the People's Church was held, with roughly 400 people in attendance. Despite his commitment to the People's Church, Smith did not intend to leave the Methodist Church. He hoped to secure a leave from the Church so that he could pursue his work with the People's Church. The Methodist Stationing Committee initially granted his request, but when a motion was called to put all special cases before the committee as a whole, the decision was rescinded.

Smith was determined that the People's Church would spread across Canada, offering an alternative to the traditional church. In 1920 he travelled to Western Canada and established the People's Church in Vancouver, Victoria, Calgary, and Edmonton. In 1923 Smith moved to Toronto and began working with the Toronto People's Church.

== Labour MLA ==
In 1920, Smith was prevailed on to run for the provincial legislature as a labour candidate in Brandon. He received the nomination of the "Brandon Labour Party", which was aligned with the Winnipeg branch of the Dominion Labour Party. He was successful in the 1920 provincial election, defeating Liberal incumbent Stephen Emmett Clement by 604 votes. Some blamed vote-splitting by the Liberals and Conservatives for his victory.

For the next two years, Smith sat with the labour parliamentary group led by Fred Dixon in the legislative opposition. Unlike other labour members, Smith did not join the Independent Labour Party when the Winnipeg branch of the Dominion Labour Party split in late 1920. In August 1921, he instead attended a meeting of the Winnipeg Trades and Labour Council which led to the creation of the Canadian Labour Party. While joining the CLP took Smith on a different path from his co-legislators, he remained a member of the labor parliamentary group.

Labour's political support in Manitoba had declined somewhat by the 1922 provincial election. Smith lost his seat to John Edmison, who ran as a "fusion" candidate of local Liberals and Conservatives as a way to prevent vote-splitting by competing Liberal and Conservative camps.

== Move to Toronto ==
No longer receiving a salary as a Methodist minister or Member of the Legislative Assembly (MLA), Smith experienced financial difficulties in Brandon and returned to Ontario in 1923, where he immediately started a People's Church in Toronto.

Smith was involved in the Forum Committee of the Labour Temple in Toronto, and was a prominent member of the Canadian Labour Party, becoming provincial party president in 1925. Unlike James Simpson, Smith supported opening the CLP to members of the newly formed Communist Party of Canada.

== Joining the Communist Party ==
Smith's personal philosophy evolved in this period, and in January 1925 he joined the Communist Party. His membership in the party was confirmed at a small upstairs room at 8 Gerrard Street East in Toronto, at a meeting of the party officials. He later defended his decision to a Toronto Star reporter saying that communism was a part of man's social evolution. Smith remained a member of the Communist Party for the rest of his life. Still a prominent figure in Toronto, he often defended the Communist Party against threats from hostile governments.

He was a prominent organizer for the Canadian Labour Defence League across Canada in the 1920s. He served as its general secretary until it was shut down by the Canadian government in 1940.

He ran for a seat in the House of Commons of Canada in the 1925 federal election as a CLP candidate in the northern Ontario riding of Port Arthur—Thunder Bay. He finished fourth, with 1,363 votes. The winner was William Fitzgerald Langworthy of the Conservative Party. At the time of the election, Smith described his occupation as "educationalist".

He ran again in the 1926 election, and finished third with 1,382 votes. The winner was Conservative Donald James Cowan.

Smith ran for municipal office in Toronto during this period. In 1925, he ran for alderman in Ward Seven as a candidate of the Labour Representation Political Association, a broad-tent group aligned with the Canadian Labour Party. He was unsuccessful, and ran and lost a second time in 1926.

He ran as a candidate of the Ontario CLP in the 1926 provincial election, He received just 416 votes in Hamilton Centre.

In the 1930 federal election he ran as an independent candidate in Fort William, winning just 594 votes.

== Opposition to Trotskyism ==
During the late 1920s, Smith was a prominent opponent of Trotskyism within the Communist Party of Canada. He supported the removal of Maurice Spector and Jack MacDonald from the CPC, and endorsed Tim Buck, a strong supporter of Joseph Stalin, to become party leader in 1929. In his autobiography, Smith accused Leon Trotsky of attempting to betray the Russian Revolution, alleging that he had been "in the service of British agents" in 1926.

With the Canadian Labour Party falling into disarray, Smith returned to northern Ontario for the federal election of 1930 and contested Fort William as an independent candidate. He received 594 votes, finishing third.

== Stalinism ==
Smith visited the Soviet Union for the first time in 1932 and wrote favourably of the experience upon his return.

In July 1936, he traveled to Spain during the Spanish Civil War as an emissary of the "Friends of the Mackenzie–Papineau Battalion".

Smith was one of the most vocal defenders of CPC leader Tim Buck in the early 1930s. Buck incarcerated in the Kingston Penitentiary, and an attempt was made on his life. In 1934, Smith was arrested and charged with sedition (under section 98 of the Criminal Code) due to statements he made in support of the Eight Men Speak play. He was acquitted. The coverage of the court case publicized the attempt on Buck's life, and soon the government released from prison Buck and seven other CPC leaders.

In the 1934 Ontario general election, Smith was the Communist Party candidate in York East, running against Conservative Premier George Stewart Henry in his own riding. He was the highest profile CPC candidate in the province, and a frequent speaker at meetings and rallies supporting the party's slate of 12 candidates. However, he was unsuccessful in his run against Premier Henry and CCF candidate Arthur Henry Williams, president of the East York Workers' Association. Smith came in fourth with just 645 votes.

Also in 1934, Smith ran for Mayor of Toronto. In that larger district he polled a surprising but still insufficient 8,500 votes.

Returning again to northern Ontario, Smith ran for the House of Commons as a CPC candidate in the 1935 federal election. He received 1,161 votes for a fourth-place finish in Port Arthur.

== Later years ==
Smith largely curtailed his political activities after this time, though he remained an active figure within the Communist Party.

He returned to Manitoba for the 1945 federal election and ran as a candidate for the Labor-Progressive Party (as the Communist Party had renamed itself) in his old riding of Brandon. He received 497 votes, finishing fourth.

Smith died on April 12, 1947, in Toronto. His autobiography, All My Life, was published posthumously in 1949. The work chronicles his religious and political evolution, and gives extensive consideration to the Communist Party's struggles of the 1930s.

To the end of his life, Smith argued that his beliefs were a reflection of the message promoted by Jesus.

A. E. Smith's son, Stewart Smith, was a leading member of the Communist Party in his own right.

== See also ==
- Salem Bland
- William Irvine (Canadian politician)
- William Ivens

Legislative Assembly of Manitoba
Preceded by Stephen Emmett Clement	Member of the Legislative Assembly for Brandon City; 1920–1922	Succeeded by John Edmison
