= Jeanne Corbin =

Canadian activist (1906–1944)

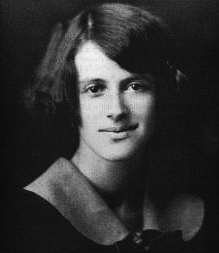
- Jeanne Corbin
- Born: March 1906; Cellettes, Loir-et-Cher, France
- Died: 7 May 1944 (aged 38); London, Ontario
- Occupation: Communist Activist

Jeanne Corbin (March 1906 – 7 May 1944) was a communist activist and trade union organiser in Canada.

Corbin and her family emigrated from France to Canada in 1911. After landing in Newfoundland, the family made their way to a farm near Edmonton, Alberta.

In high school, she joined the Young Communist League of Canada. Later, she was a member of the Workers' Defense League. An active member of the Communist Party of Canada, she is considered a "Party heroine" of the CPC.

She died at the age of 38 due to tuberculosis.

== ‌Biography ==
Jeanne Corbin was born in the village of Cellettes, Loir-et-Cher, in France, in 1906, into a family of small winegrowers and day laborers. Her parents were Jean-Baptiste Corbin and Henriette Marguerite Louise Valpré. At the age of five she immigrated to Canada with her parents. Corbin family settled in Lindbrook, on 160 acres of land that was granted to them, near the village of Tofield, northeast of Edmonton, Alberta.

In order to continue her high school studies, she had to leave her village to settle in the city of Edmonton. During her studies at the Victoria School, Jeanne Corbin worked within the Young Pioneers organization bringing together the children of trade unionist parents and members of the Communist Party. It was around the same time that she met Becky Buhay, a member of the party's Central Committee. She first attended the Communist Youth League, then joined the Communist Party around the age of 18.On November 29, 1925, while Jeanne Corbin met young pioneers, the director of the Royal Canadian Mounted Police (RCMP), Joseph Ritchie, noticed her and opened a file in her name which would follow her throughout her life. He then describes her as a “dangerous communist agitator”.

== Illness and end of life ==
In September 1939, she felt sick and consulted a doctor but nothing serious was found. In November 1942, her health deteriorated. Doctors discovered that she was suffering from tuberculosis and that both of her lungs were affected.

She was then hospitalized at the Queen Alexandra Sanatorium in London, Ontario. She died on May 7, 1944 after 18 months of fighting the disease.

She is buried at Park Lawn Cemetery in Toronto, People who attended her funeral, included Tim Buck and Annie Buller. Today, only a number engraved on a small stone indicates the location of her tomb.
