= Buhay (disambiguation) =

Buhay is a Ukrainian friction drum, known as buhai in Romania.

Buhay or Buhai may also refer to:

== People ==
- Ashleigh Buhai (born 1989), South African professional golfer
- Becky Buhay (1896-1953), Canadian labour activist and union organizer
- Shen Buhai, Chinese essayist, philosopher, and politician
- Gao Buhai, Chinese philosopher
- Vladyslav Buhay is a Ukrainian footballer
- Mr. Buhay, the defendant in the R v Buhay case before the Supreme Court of Canada

== Other ==
- Buhai, a river in Romania
- Buhay (album)
- Buhay Party-List, Philippine party-list group

== See also ==
- Mabuhay (disambiguation)
