= Tom Burpee =

Canadian communist leader (1885–1972)

Henry Thomas Burpee (1885–1972) was elected the first leader of the Communist Party of Canada in May 1921. He was succeeded in December 1921 by William Moriarty. As he preferred to take care of less public and more administrative work, he organized a school where immigrants can learn English. He remained active with the party for the rest of his life and was one of three founding members present at the party's fiftieth anniversary celebration in 1971.
