= Annie Buller =

Co-founder of the Communist Party of Canada

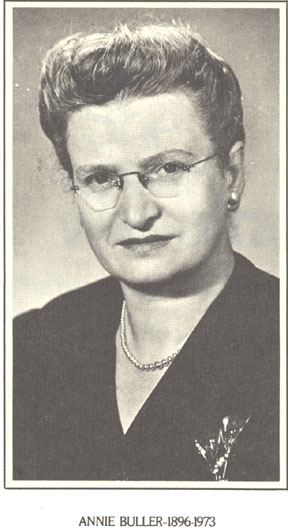
- Born: 9 December 1895; Montreal, Quebec, Canada
- Died: 19 January 1973 (aged 77)
- Education: Rand School of Social Science
- Political party: Communist Party of Canada
- Spouse: Harry Guralnick (m. 1924; died 1972)
- Children: Jimmy Buller

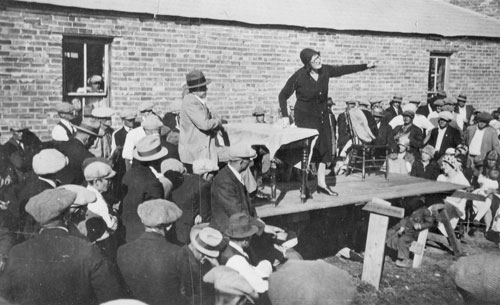
Annie Buller addressing crowd before the Estevan Riot

Annie Buller (9 December 1895 – 19 January 1973), also known as Annie Buller-Guralnick, was a union organizer as well as co-founder of the Communist Party of Canada (CPC) and manager of many CPC publications.

== Background ==
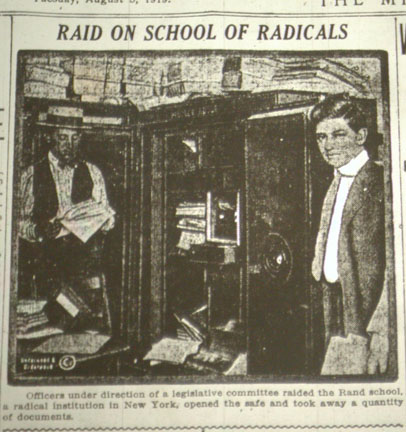
Buller was a student at the Rand School during a Lusk Committee raid that seized documents to fuel its investigations (Summer 1919)

Annie S. Buller was born on December 9, 1895, in Ukraine to a Jewish family with three brothers. Her father was a carpenter. She emigrated to Montreal with her parents in the early 1900s. She became politically active in socialist politics during World War I and followed her friend Becky Buhay (1896–1953) to study Marxist thought at the Rand School of Social Science in New York. In May 1920, Algernon Lee, educational director, presided over the graduation of the second-largest class ever at Rand, whose members included: John J. Bardsley, William D. Bavelaar, Annie S. Buller, Louis Cohan, Harry A. Durlauf, Clara Friedman, Rebecca Goldberg, William Greenspoon, Isabella E. Hall, Ammon A. Hennsey (Ammon Hennacy), Hedwig Holmes, Annie Kronhardt, Anna P. Lee, Victoria Levinson, Elsie Lindenberg, Selma Melms, Hyman Neback, Bertha Ruvinsky, Celia Samorodin, Mae Schiff, Esther T. Shemitz, Nathan S. Spivak, Esther Silverman, Sophia Ruderman, and Clara Walters.

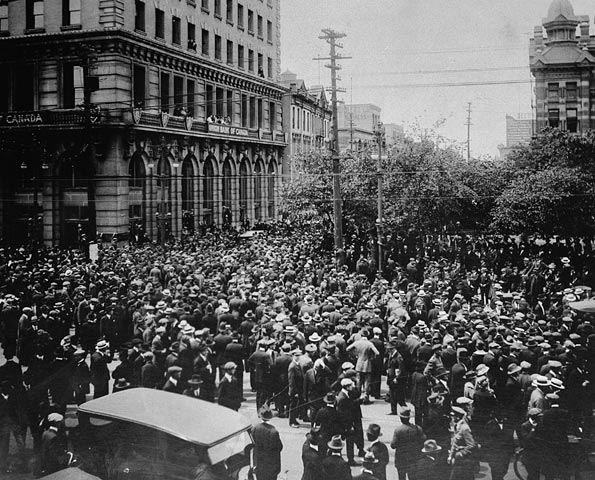
Buller supported the Winnipeg General Strike (June 21, 1919): here, a crowd gathers outside old City Hall

While at Rand, Buller helped raise funds in New York for Canadians in the Winnipeg General Strike.

== Career ==
By age 13, Buller was working in a tobacco factory, 12 hours a day, 6 days a week. By the age of 16, she had become a clerk in a "five and dime store." By age 17, she had a job in Almy's Department Store, where she became head buyer of china and glassware. With Buhay, she became involved in a Socialist youth group.

=== Montreal Labour College ===
In 1920, on her return to Montreal from the Rand School in New York City, Buller, Buhay, fellow Rand student Bella Gauld (1878–1961), and others founded the Montreal Labour College. They modeled the school on the Rand School and the British Plebs League. The start-up committee comprised: Buller, Becky Buhay, Becky's brother Mike Buhay, Bella Gauld, a Mrs. Frankel, Mike Garber of the Revolutionary Communist Party of Canada (CPR), Nathan Mendelssohn, George Lloyd, Dick Kerrigan, Bill Long, and Sylvia Robertson. Visiting professors included Scott Nearing.

=== Union organizing ===
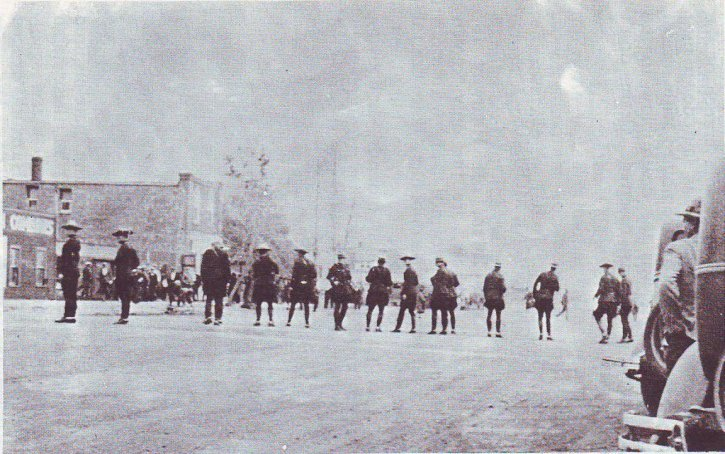
Photo from the Estevan Riot, which Buller supported (1931)

Throughout the 1920s, Buller worked as a union organizer and traveled extensively throughout Canada organizing the needle trades and supporting miners and steel workers. In 1931, she led a general strike for better wages and working conditions for dressmakers in Toronto. In the mid-1920s, she became business manager of The Worker newspaper.

Following the 1931 Estevan Coal Miners Strike, Buller spoke in support of formation of the Mine Workers' Union of Canada. On February 23, 1932, she faced preliminary hearing for rioting, for which she was convicted. On March 10, 1933, a retrial began; again, she was convicted and imprisoned for one year without fine in the North Battleford Prison. During the later 1930s, she managed the Mid-West Clarion party newspaper of Winnipeg until its repression under the War Measures Act (Defence of Canada Regulations). In 1940, during a crackdown on Communist Party members, Buller was arrested along with Louis Guberman and Jock McNeil and jailed in Portage la Prairie (1940–1942). Her husband Harry Guralnick was also interned at that time.

Upon release from prison, she joined the Dominion Communist–Labor Total War Committee in Manitoba. She partook in the first national convention of the Labor-Progressive Party, when she was elected to the National Committee.

=== Political organizing ===
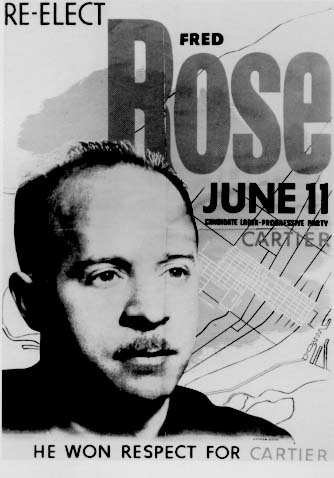
Buller helped found the Communist Party of Canada and Labor-Progressive Party (here, poster of Fred Rose for re-election

Arising from efforts in the Montreal Labour College, Buller became a co-founder of the Communist Party of Canada in Montreal." In August 1931, the Government of Canada made the Party illegal and sentenced eight Party leaders to a total of 37 years (an average 4-5 years each) in prison.

Buller ran for public office several times. In 1932 she ran for a Toronto City Council position as a Workers United Front candidate. In 1952, she ran as a Labor-Progressive Party candidate in St. Paul's and again in 1956 (at age 61) in Spadina Ward.

After World War II, Buller continued to be involved in CPC activities such as the campaigns to roll back prices organized by National Women's Commission and the Housewives' Association.

She remained active in the CPC until her retirement from her publication responsibilities in the late 1950s. In 1955, Buller and Guralnick visited the Soviet Union. She visited the Stalin auto plant in Moscow. Buller wrote that she was 'greatly impressed' by the organization of the plant's workers and their working conditions.

During the 1960s, she was active in the Anti-Vietnam War movement. p. {{{1}}}

== Personal life and death ==
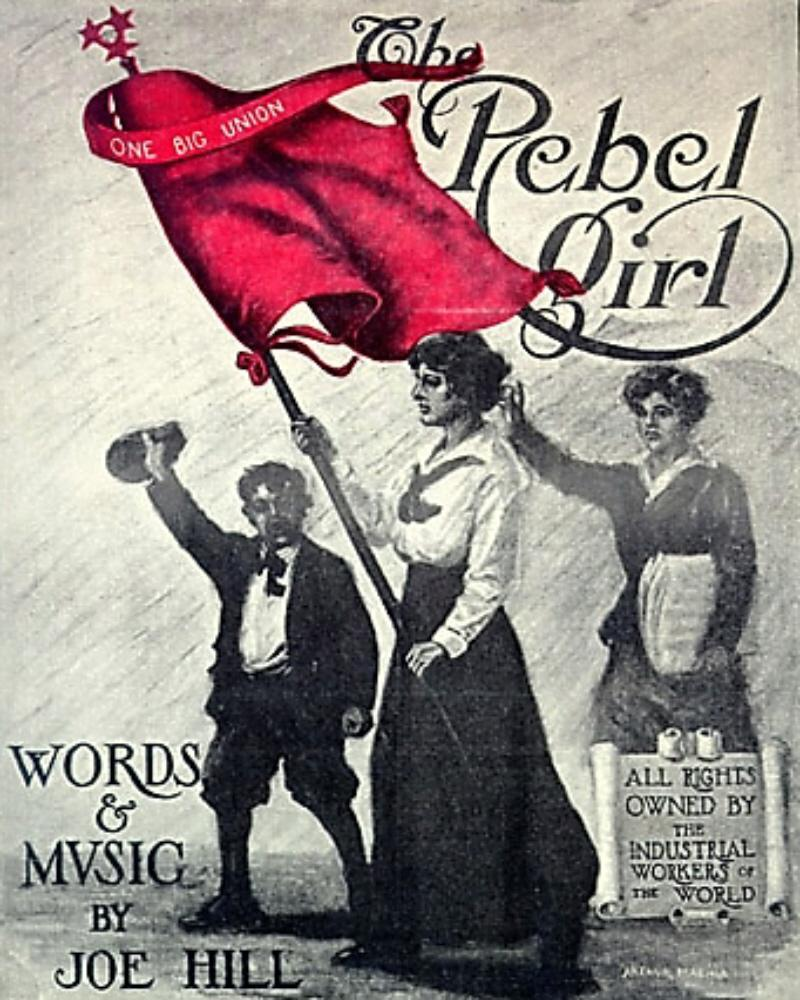
Buller was a friend of IWW/CPUSA activist Elizabeth Gurley Flynn (inspiration for Joe Hill's song, "The Rebel Girl" (1915)

Buller married Harry Guralnick (died 1972), who was an activist in the Jewish Labor League; they had one son, Jimmy.

Buller met and knew "her American counterpart," Elizabeth Gurley Flynn, who supported Buller's efforts in writing and public speaking. Buller wrote for causes the Flynn supported, including Sacco and Vanzetti.

Buller was also friends with French-born Jeanne Corbin (circa 1909–May 1944).

Buller died on January 19, 1973. William Kashtan, CPC general secretary, spoke at her funeral.

== Legacy ==
CPC member John Weir called Buller Canada's Rosa Luxemburg and Elizabeth Gurley Flynn.

Buller, friend Becky Buhay, and precursor Florence Custance, were some of the few women in the early CPC: Buller and Buhay "came to symbolize female leadership in the CPC for the next thirty years."

== Works ==
Articles:

- "Path of Struggle: The Toronto Dressmakers" (1951)
- "Glorious Heritage of Canadian Women" (1952)
- "Sam Scarlett" (undated)
- "International Women's Day" with Florence Theodore (1953)

== See also ==
- Communist Party of Canada
- Worker's Unity League
- Mine Workers' Union of Canada
- Estevan riot
- Rand School of Social Science
- Elizabeth Gurley Flynn

== External sources ==
- Annie Buller at CanadianEncyclopedia.ca.
- Progress Books Online Contains PDF version of She Never was Afraid: The Biography of Annie Buller
