= Bella Hall Gauld =

Canadian educator, activist, and pianist

- Born: December 31, 1878; Lindsay, Canada
- Died: August 21, 1961 (aged 82); Montreal, Canada
- Education: Rand School of Social Science
- Political party: Communist Party of Canada (1922–)
- Other political affiliations: Labor-Progressive Party of Canada

Bella Hall Gauld (31 December 1878 – 21 August 1961) was a Canadian labour educator, political activist, and pianist.

Gauld was born in Lindsay, Ontario and raised on a farm in Manitoba. She joined the newly formed Workers Party of Canada, which was known after 1924 as the Communist Party of Canada. She and Annie Buller studied at the Rand School of Social Science in New York City before returning to Montreal and establishing the Montreal Labour College. When that organisation ended in 1924, Gauld helped form a Women's Labour League.
