= Becky Buhay =

Canadian labour activist

- Born: February 11, 1896; London, England
- Died: December 16, 1953 (aged 57); Toronto, Ontario, Canada
- Spouse(s): Tom Ewen (1931–c. 1936)
- Relatives: Michael Buhay (brother)

Rebecca Buhay (February 11, 1896 – December 16, 1953), known as Becky Buhay, (Note: Occasionally "Beckie"; occasionally "Buhay-Ewen".) was a Canadian labour activist and union organizer. She was a leader of the Communist Party of Canada (CPC), among many other left-wing organizations.

== Early life (1896–1917) ==
Buhay's family were originally from London's East End. Evidently, she came from a family of leftists: she attended socialist Sunday school as a child, joined the Independent Labour Party with her brother when both were children, and studied Marx in her early years.

Buhay's family came to Canada from England in 1912 or 1913, and settled in Montreal. In Montreal, Buhay worked at Rice Studios, a photography firm which later gained local fame for the hockey photography of James Rice, its proprietor.

The first leftist organization Buhay joined in Montreal was the Socialist Party of Canada, but she left when it became clear to her that the Party was more interested in ideological debates than political action. Thereafter, she joined the Social Democratic Party of Canada.

Buhay was Jewish, although Toews describes her connections to the Jewish community as "quite tenuous".

== New York (1917–19) ==
From 1917 to 1919, Buhay joined the Amalgamated Clothing Workers in New York City as an organizer and was secretary of the Socialist Party of America. She is sometimes held to have attended at the Rand School of Social Science, a New York socialist educational institution, but this is disputed. In any event, however, Buhay soon left New York—the late 1910s were the height of the First Red Scare and, as an associate of various radical organizations, she risked arrest.

Upon her return to Montreal in 1919, in the wake of the Winnipeg general strike, Buhay served as an official of the One Big Union. She was elected an organizer at the Montreal local's first meeting, and later served as vice president.

== Communist Party of Canada ==
While the Communist Party of Canada (CPC) became a marginal force in Canadian politics by mid-century, in the 1920s and 1930s it exerted a significant influence in domains such as "workers' rights, freedom of speech, and social welfare programs". Reiter has described Buhay as, along with Annie Buller, one of the "most prominent Communists in the late 1920s and 1930s". Toews notes that Buhay and Buller played quite varied roles in the CPC: "[t]hey travelled anywhere that the Party needed them, working as educators, union organizers, fund-raisers, administrators, leadership committee members, lecturers, and writers".

Buhay joined the CPC—or, rather, the Workers Party of Canada, essentially a CPC faction—in 1922, soon after it was founded in 1921. She had a "leadership position[]" in the Communist Party of Canada in the 1920s–30s, and was one of only three women (the others being Florence Custance and Annie Buller) to serve on the Central Committee of the CPC during that period.

In the early 1920s, Buhay—along with Buller and several others—helped to found the Montreal Labour College, an institution similar to the Rand School which provided socialist education from a campus at 70 Jeanne Mance Street in Montreal's Ville-Marie neighbourhood.

Buhay was active in The Worker, the CPC's official organ. She wrote numerous articles and sold subscriptions. In 1923, while on one of two trips she took across the nation for The Worker, Buhay organized a protest by the wives of coal miners on strike in Edmonton.

In 1929, Buhay was arrested for vagrancy in downtown Toronto (at Queen and Soho) during a free speech demonstration. (Her conviction was later quashed.) The demonstration was one episode in a larger free speech movement by Communists in the late 1920s, particularly in Toronto, in the wake of Section 98's ban of sedition. Continuing the fight against Section 98, Buhay organized a rally—originally to be a debate against Raymond Morand, a member of the Bennett government, but Morand did not accept his invitation—against the measure in the early 1930s.

In 1930, Buhay became the head of the CPC's Women's Department, in which capacity she led a Party trip to the Soviet Union.

In the early 1930s, Buhay, along with a number of other CPC activists, was surveilled by the RCMP.

On July 16, 1931, Buhay married Tom Ewen, described as a fellow member of the CPC's "elite", in Buffalo. The marriage was short-lived: they divorced within five years.

== Organizing in the "needle trades" ==
The Canadian garment industry saw some of the country's heaviest union activity in the 1930s. During that period, Buhay served as a leader of the Industrial Union of Needle Trades Workers. In 1931, she argued in The Worker that the CPC was not devoting sufficient resources to organizing women in the garment industry.

== Author ==
She authored several small books - Marxism and Canadian Politics. School in Ten Sessions (published in Timmins, Ontario by the Labour Progressive Party, Northern Regional Committee); Imperialism: The Final Stage of Capitalism. (Labor-Progressive Party, Ontario Committee); Wall St. and It’s Canadian Lackeys Hate and Fear Socialism, Bulletin no. 11: Facts Fight for Peace. (Beckie Buhay) (Labor-Progressive Party – National Education Department, 1948); The Fight for the Party, Educational Outline. (National Education Department, Labor-Progressive Party, 1948), 6pp.

== Bibliography ==
- Eaton, C. Scott (2018). "'A Sharp Offensive in All Directions': The Canadian Labour Defense League and the Fight against Section 98, 1931–1936". Labour / Le Travail. 82: 41–80. doi:10.1353/llt.2018.0036. JSTOR 26551538. S2CID 150133990.
- Sangster, Joan (1985). "The Communist Party and the Woman Question, 1922–1929". Labour / Le Travail. 15: 24–56. doi:10.2307/25140552. JSTOR 25140552.
- Sangster, Joan (1989). Dreams of Equality: Women on the Canadian Left, 1920–1950. Toronto: McClelland & Stewart; University of Toronto Press. ISBN 978-1-4426-2349-1. OCLC 903968416.
- Toews, Anne Frances (2009). For Liberty, Bread, and Love: Annie Buller, Beckie Buhay, and the Forging of Communist Militant Femininity in Canada, 1918–1939 (MA thesis). Department of History, Simon Fraser University.
- Tulchinsky, Gerald J. J. (2008). Canada's Jews: A People's Journey. Toronto: University of Toronto Press. p. 265. ISBN 978-1-4426-8748-6. OCLC 608124772.
