= Lindbrook, Alberta =

Human settlement in Canada

Coordinates: 53°23′46″N 112°48′26″W

Location of Lindbrook Alberta

Lindbrook is an unincorporated community in central Alberta in Beaver County, located 4 km (2.5 mi) north of Highway 14. It is situated 10 km (6.2 mi) from Tofield, 17 km (11 mi) from Miquelon Lake Provincial Park, and 48 km (30 mi) southeast of Edmonton. A residential subdivision, Lindbrook Estates, completes the Lindbrook area.

== Toponymy ==
Lindbrook received its name in 1909 when residents formed a school district to serve the area. Among its earliest trustees were E. Lindberg and F. L. Surbrook (sometimes recorded as Sherbrook) whose surnames were combined into 'Lindbrook.'

== Topography ==
Lindbrook is situated in the Beaverhill Upland, a densely forested region characterized by uneven hummocky terrain. Soil in the area is primarily Luvisolic and deficient in nutrients, or Organic and poorly drained, making Lindbrook unsuitable for some forms of arable agriculture.

=== Flora and fauna ===
Most trees in and around Lindbrook are trembling aspens, balsam poplars, and white birches. The community is home to populations of white-tailed deer and northern flying squirrels. Mountain bluebirds, red-winged blackbirds, ruffed grouse, and Brewer's blackbirds have also been observed in Lindbrook.

== History ==
=== Founding and early development: 1900–1935 ===
In the early 20th century, the area later named Lindbrook became home to several farms and homesteaders. The community received a name in 1909, when residents organized the Lindbrook School District. 1909 also saw the Grand Trunk Pacific Railway (which later became the Canadian National Railway) build a line through the settlement, which began offering passenger rail services the following year. Lindbrook School opened in December 1910, and Lindbrook received a railway station in 1914.

In 1933, a grain elevator was installed beside the railway to serve Lindbrook's farms. The settlement received telephone services through the Lindbrook Mutual Telephone Company, a rural co-operative, the following year.

=== Mid-20th century: 1936–1965 ===
A Lindbrook post office opened in 1937. That year saw Lindbrook become home to several Russian Mennonite families, who relocated from Tofield following the dissolution of a communal ranch there. They held religious services in Lindbrook School until 1940, when they constructed the Mennonite Brethren Church of Lindbrook. The schoolhouse was also in use as a community centre until 1939, when residents began fundraising to construct Lindbrook Community Hall. The facility opened in late 1940.

Lindbrook's grain elevator was dismantled in 1951; its train station followed in the late 1960s, thus ending passenger rail services to the community. After the local Mennonite congregation outgrew its existing facility, the Mennonite Brethren Church of Lindbrook relocated to Tofield in 1962.

In November 1965, a 79-car freight train carrying potash partially derailed outside of Lindbrook. The derailment of 27 cars resulted in no injuries, but caused damage to over 1,000 feet of the railway track.

=== Rest of 20th century: 1966–2000 ===
Lindbrook's post office closed permanently in October 1969; the settlement's telephone provider became Alberta Government Telephones in November 1971.

A couple living in Lindbrook discovered the remains of an unknown murder victim in their farm's septic tank in April 1977. The man, who was quickly dubbed "Septic Tank Sam" by the media, would not be publicly named as Gordon Edwin Sanderson until June 2021, after developments in DNA technology enabled his identification.

In 1978, the Helios Nudist Association purchased 22 acres of land bordering Lindbrook for use by its membership. A residential district, Lindbrook Estates, was established 4 km (2.5 mi) to the east of Lindbrook in the late 1970s, to serve commuters working in Sherwood Park and Edmonton.

=== 21st century: 2001–present ===
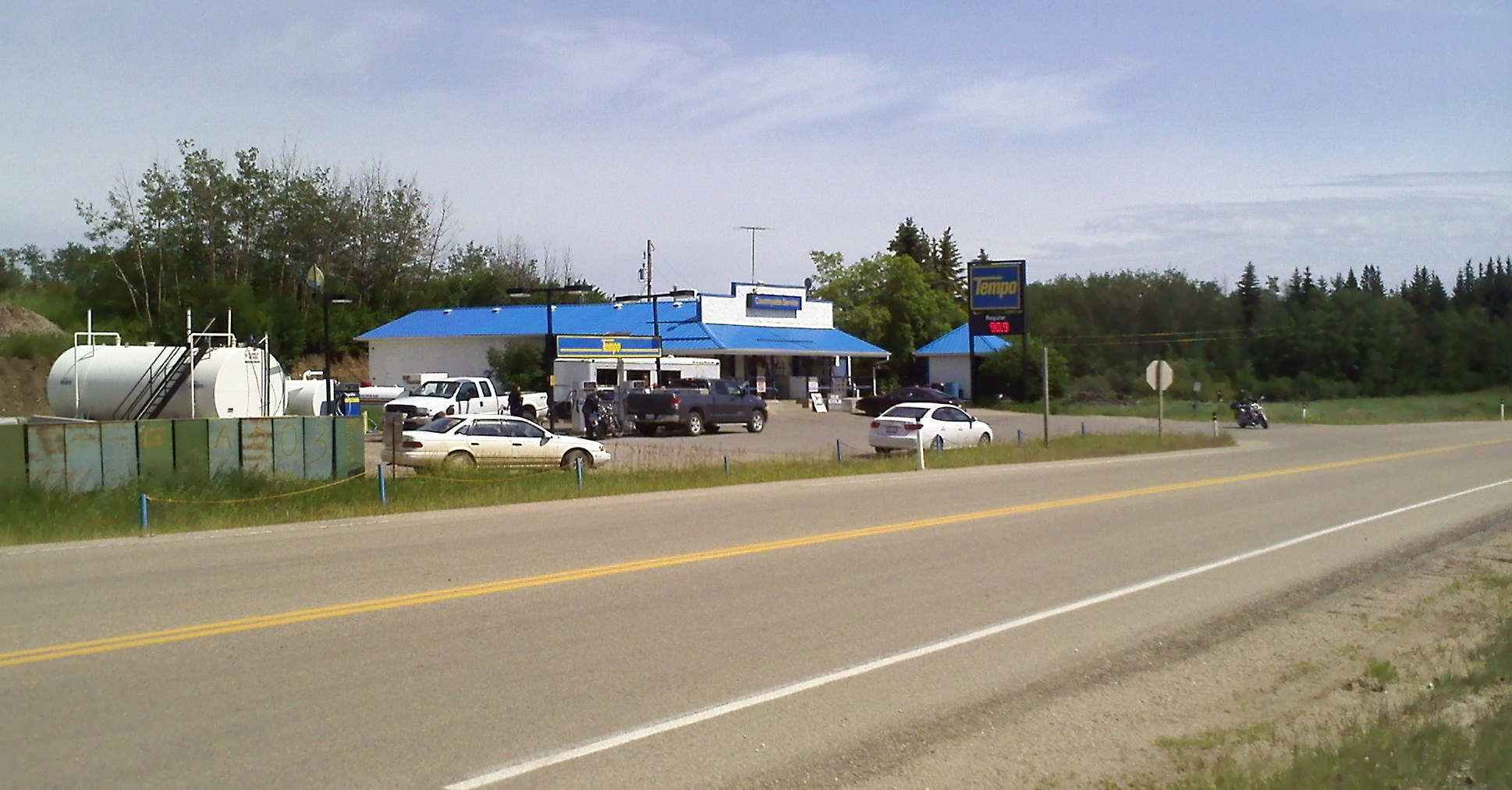
Gas station in Lindbrook, pictured in 2010.

A former student of Lindbrook School, Cornelius Warkentin, successfully lobbied Beaver County in 2010 to install a commemorative sign marking the schoolhouse's former site. Lindbrook Community Hall subsequently held a reunion for students of the school on July 2, 2011, which attracted over 50 attendees.

The hall itself celebrated 75 full years of operations in 2016, and held a potluck dinner that was attended by Jessica Littlewood.

== Services and amenities ==
=== Commerce ===
The Canadian National Railway maintains freight services through Lindbrook as of 2026. Trains have not sounded their whistles while passing Lindbrook since 2023, following a request by Beaver County.

=== Recreation ===
As of 2026, Lindbrook Community Hall remains in use for recreational events. The community also contains Lindbrook Star Gazer Campground, a campsite and RV park, and a naturist resort operated by the Helios Nudist Association.

== Demographics ==
Lindbrook's population was recorded as 61 by the 1986 Canadian census. Lindbrook and Lindbrook Estates were recorded as separate localities for the 1991 Canadian census, and returned respective populations of 18 and 85.

== Notable residents ==
- Jeanne Corbin – communist activist and trade union organiser who spent some of her childhood in Lindbrook and attended its school in the 1910s and 1920s
