= Mabuhay (disambiguation) =

Mabuhay is a Tagalog greeting, usually expressed as Mabuhay!, in the imperative form of life, thus, Live!, from the root word buhay (life).

Mabuhay may also refer to:

- Mabuhay Gardens, a San Francisco nightclub
- Mabuhay Satellite Corporation, a former Filipino aerospace corporation
- Mabuhay Singers, a group of singers from the Philippines that was formed in 1958
- Mabuhay, Zamboanga Sibugay, a municipality in the province of Zamboanga Sibugay, Philippines
- Mabuhay (magazine), inflight magazine of Philippines Airlines
- Mabuhay Lounge, the airport lounge for Philippines Airlines

== See also ==
- Buhay (disambiguation)
