= Port Arthur—Thunder Bay =

Former federal electoral district in Ontario, Canada

Ontario electoral district

Defunct federal electoral district
- Legislature: House of Commons
- District created: 1924
- District abolished: 1933
- First contested: 1925
- Last contested: 1930

Port Arthur—Thunder Bay was a federal electoral district represented in the House of Commons of Canada from 1925 to 1935. It was located in the province of Ontario. This riding was created in 1924 from parts of Algoma West and Port Arthur and Kenora ridings.

It consisted of the north-east parts of the territorial districts of Kenora and Thunder Bay.

The electoral district was abolished in 1933 when it was merged into Port Arthur riding.

== Members of Parliament ==
This riding has elected the following members of Parliament:

Parliament	Years	Member	Party
Riding created from Port Arthur and Kenora and Algoma West
15th	1925–1926	William Fitzgerald Langworthy	Conservative
16th	1926–1930	Donald James Cowan	Conservative
17th	1930–1935	Donald James Cowan	Conservative
Riding dissolved into Port Arthur

== Election history ==
1925 Canadian federal election: Port Arthur—Thunder Bay
Party	Candidate	Votes
Conservative	William Fitzgerald Langworthy	3,277
Independent Conservative	John James Carrick	2,424
Liberal	Isaac Lamont Matthews	2,413
Canadian Labour	Albert Edward Smith	1,363

1926 Canadian federal election: Port Arthur—Thunder Bay
Party	Candidate	Votes
Conservative	Donald James Cowan	4,349
Liberal–Labour	Alexander Jarvis McComber	2,990
Canadian Labour	Albert Edward Smith	1,382

1930 Canadian federal election: Port Arthur—Thunder Bay
Party	Candidate	Votes
Conservative	Donald James Cowan	6,371
Liberal	John James Carrick	4,415

== See also ==
- List of Canadian electoral districts
- Historical federal electoral districts of Canada
