= People's Voice (newspaper) =

Canadian newspaper published fortnightly

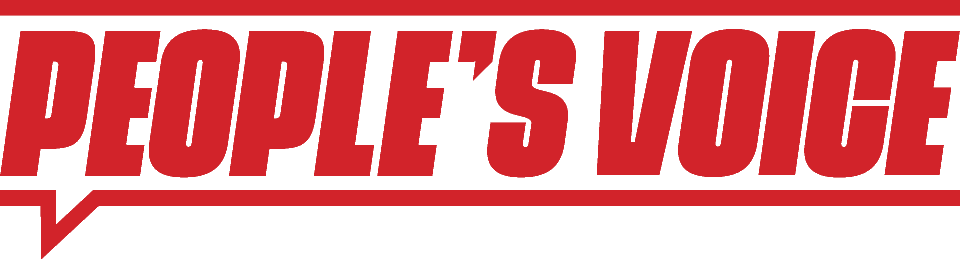

- Front page of the September 2022 issue of People's Voice
- Editor-in-chief: Dave McKee
- Founded: March 1993; 33 years ago
- Language: English
- Country: Canada
- Sister newspapers: Rebel Youth, Clarté
- Website: pvonline.ca

People's Voice is a Canadian newspaper published fortnightly by New Labour Press Ltd. The paper's editorial line reflects the viewpoints of the Communist Party of Canada, although it also runs articles by other leftist voices. Established in 1993 under this name, the paper and online service have a history of ancestral publications dating to the early 1920s, when the first paper of this line was founded by the new Communist Party of Canada.

Produced in Toronto and printed at a union press in Hamilton, People's Voice contains news and editorial content related to Canadian and international political issues of government, social movements, and class struggle.

== History ==
Progressive, socialist and trade union newspapers have a long history in Canada, going back to the 19th century. Throughout this history of the socialist and communist press, newspapers have been closed down, restarted, and had many name changes. The development of the "red press" is therefore more complex than normal.

Front page of The Worker, December 17, 1932

Various Canadian publications printed translations of Marx, Engels and other radicals and revolutionaries. Many of these publications were attached to local labour movements or ethnic groups. But there was no all-Canada, English-speaking left-wing press until the Communist Party of Canada was founded in 1921, and its leaders decided to publish a newspaper.

In 1922, The Communist was the first attempt. It was an underground publication that was harassed by the police. The paper never got off the ground and closed after only a few issues. The first successful and legal paper was launched on March 15, 1922, as a broadsheet named The Worker. During the 1930s, the paper was renamed The Clarion.

When the paper grew from a weekly into a daily on May 1, 1936, it was renamed as The Daily Clarion, and remained so until June 17, 1939. At that time the Party decided that the fluctuating circulation of 6,000 to 12,000 was not high enough to continue as a daily. Two weeklies replaced the daily, The Clarion to cover from Ontario eastward, and The Mid-West Clarion from Manitoba westward, excluding British Columbia. In addition, Clarté was the French-language leftist paper in Quebec. State efforts against it began in 1937 with the enactment of the Padlock Law.

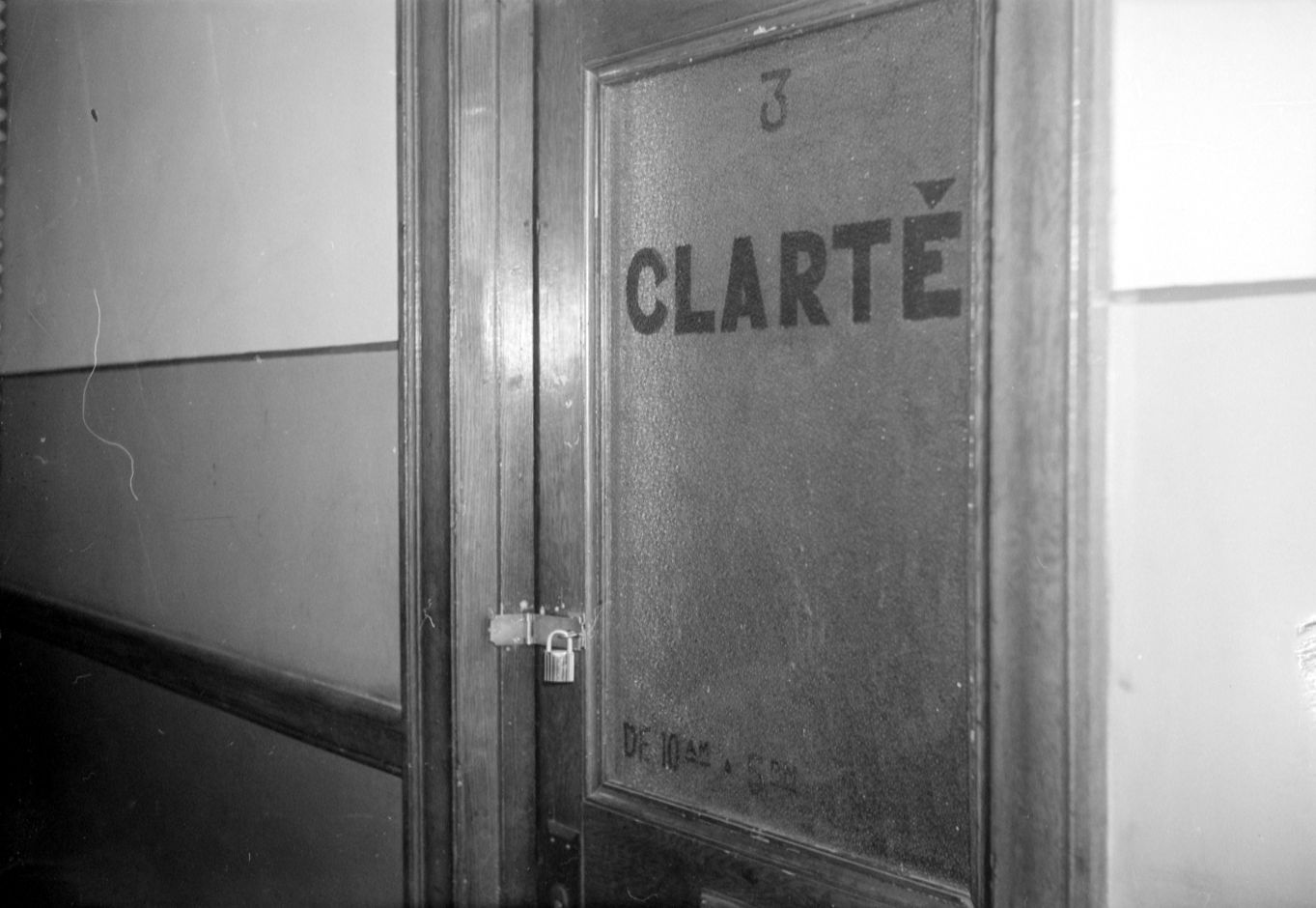
The doorway to the offices of Clarté were padlocked by police under the Padlock Law

In British Columbia, the only paper distributed was the People's Advocate. Before being published as the People's Advocate, the paper also went through many changes: it was first known as the B.C. Worker's News; the first edition of that paper appeared on January 18, 1935. It was changed to the People's Advocate on April 2, 1937. It was banned in May 1940, with the successor Vancouver Clarion publishing illegally until summer 1941. The People, a newly emerged legal paper, was first published on October 13, 1942. This paper changed its name to the Pacific Tribune.

The Clarion was banned on November 21, 1939. The ban was due to publishing an anti-war editorial during wartime, breaking regulation 15 under the Defense of Canada Regulations. This was several months before the Communist Party was banned in June 1940, when the Canadian government issued an Order in Council.

Shortly after being shut down by the Dominion government, the paper began printing (at first) underground under the name Canadian Tribune. The first copies were mimeographed. Officially the Canadian Tribune began on January 20, 1940. The B.C paper changed its name to the Pacific Tribune to appear as a local edition. The two publications were weeklies. The Canadian edition was briefly a daily before returning to the previous weekly schedule and was later converted to tabloid format.

"The Trib", as it was known to supporters and detractors, became a standard voice of the left over several decades. It maintained a base of subscriptions in Canada and internationally that reached wider than the membership of the Communist Party of Canada.

The present incarnation of the paper began, first, with the amalgamation of the Canadian Tribune and its second Pacific edition in the early 1990s, during the internal crisis in the Communist Party. The combined paper became The Tribune. During this time, the paper became part of a legal battle and as a result, only several issues were printed. With the split in the Communist Party and the establishment of the Cecil-Ross Society, two publications resulted: The New Times or "TNT" for short, was the direct continuation of The Tribune. Its publication was very short lived.

Having lost its newspaper, the Communist Party decided to start its own version of Canadian Tribune. The remaining staff still in the party began to publish People's Voice in March 1993 as a tabloid; it continues to the present. The paper was published on a monthly basis until 1998, when it began to print twice-monthly.

Long-time editor Kimball Cariou stepped down in July 2019 and was replaced by current editor and former leader of the Communist Party of Canada - Ontario, Dave McKee.

== Political stance ==
People's Voice is openly partisan and leftist. According to its website, the paper is "carrying on the tradition of the socialist press in Canada since 1922". Each online article is presented as coming from "Canada's leading socialist newspaper".

The print edition says that the paper reports and analyzes events "from a revolutionary perspective, helping to build the movements for justice and equality, and eventually for a socialist Canada", and identifies as "the paper that fights for working people—on every page—in every issue."

The paper was sharply critical of the policies of Stephen Harper's Conservative government of Canada and what it describes as attacks on democratic rights, social programmes, Indigenous peoples, women, students, the environment, and Canadian sovereignty. The paper had the longest opposition by any Canadian print-media to Canada's participation in the war in Afghanistan. People's Voice has expressed support for the struggles of the Palestinian people.

During federal elections, the paper calls for a vote for the Communist Party of Canada while urging voters to support the most progressive candidates, such as an independent, NDP or left-Green, in ridings where Communists are not running. In Quebec provincial elections, it supports Québec solidaire, a left-wing political party with ten members in the Quebec National Assembly where Communists are not running. The paper also provides regular coverage of municipal politics, supporting the Coalition of Progressive Electors in Vancouver.

People's Voice runs "Workers of all lands, unite!" in three languages on its front page: English, French and Cree, in order to represent English, French, and Indigenous Canada.

== Key people ==
=== Editors ===
- Dave McKee (2019–present)
- Kimball Cariou (1993–2019)

=== Business managers ===
- Hassan Azimikor, current
- Sam Hammond, former

=== Editorial Advisory Board ===
- Ivan Byard, writer
- Kimball Cariou, writer
- Miguel Figueroa, writer
- Drew Garvie, writer
- Jeanne McGuire, writer
- Liz Rowley, editorial board and labour columnist
- Adrien Welsh, writer

=== Columnists and others ===
- Naomi Rankin, columnist
- Stéphane Doucet, writer
- Wally Brooker, culture writer
- Jim Sacouman, former columnist
- Sam Hammond, former labour columnist
- Darrell Rankin, former columnist
- Mike Constable, former cartoonist

=== Foreign correspondents ===
- B. Prasant, South Asian correspondent from Kolkata. A member of the Communist Party of India (Marxist), Prasant often contributes reportage from Latin America and Bangladesh.
- Susan Hurlick, Latin American correspondent from Havana

Source: "Editorial Office". People's Voice. 32, no. 2 (Toronto): 4. February 1–15, 2024.

== See also ==
- Media proprietor
- Concentration of media ownership
- Propaganda model
- List of newspapers in Canada
