= Florence Custance =

Canadian trade unionist and labor organizer (1881–1929)

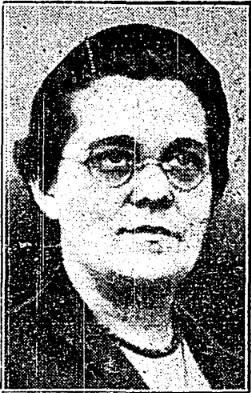
- Born: Florence Ada Ives; 31 December 1881; Dartford, Kent, England
- Died: 12 July 1929 (aged 47); Toronto Grace Health Centre, Toronto
- Burial place: Mount Pleasant Cemetery, Toronto
- Occupations: school teacher, writer, editor, union organizer
- Years active: 1919–1929
- Organization(s): Communist Party of Canada, Socialist Party of North America
- Known for: Founding member of the Communist Party of Canada
- Notable work: The Woman Worker (1926–1929)
- Political party: Communist Party of Canada
- Spouse: George Custance
- Parents: John Ives (father); Anne Eliza Munn (mother)

Florence Ada Custance was a trade unionist and labour organizer who helped found a number of socialist organizations in Canada, including a local Plebs League, the Ontario Labour College, the Socialist Party of North America, and the Communist Party of Canada. She was heavily involved in cultivating chapters of the Women's Labour League across Canada and edited the federation's monthly periodical, The Woman Worker, which ran from 1926 through to her death in 1929.

== Early life ==
Florence Ada Ives was born 31 December 1881, in Dartford, Kent, England. One of six siblings, Florence's parents were John, an iron worker, and Ann Eliza Munn. Florence trained as a school teacher. She married George James Custance, a carpenter, in 1909. The couple emigrated to Canada shortly before World War I, most likely in 1910, settling in Toronto's East End. During this time she became a member of the Socialist Party of North America.

== Labour organizing ==
Florence was active in socialist circles in Toronto and Southern Ontario in the early decades of the twentieth century. Along with Bill Moriarty, Tim Bell and Maurice Spector, Custance helped found and operated a local Plebs' League, a precursor to the Communist Party of Canada. She also helped found the Ontario Labour College, where she taught courses on economics and economic geography.

== Communist Party of Canada ==
Florence was one of the original founders of the Communist Party of Canada. She was also the only woman who attended the secret meeting in a Guelph farmhouse in 1921 that founded the party. She was secretary of the party's Women's Bureau for many years and also served on the Canadian Labour Defense League. She was elected to the Central Executive Committee of the CPC in 1923, and also served on the Canadian Labour Defense League. Local newspapers covered Constance's international travel and speaking engagements in Chicago, Germany, and Russia where she spoke at workers' conferences. She was also under surveillance by the RCMP throughout the 1920s.

Custance was secretary and spokesperson for a relief fund which raised $100,000 for famine relief in Russia in 1921. She was the president of the Canadian Friends of Soviet Union.

== Women's Labour League and The Woman Worker (1926–1929) ==
Custance was active in organizing the Women's Guild of the Amalgamated Carpenters of Canada, and later worked to found and nurture chapters of the Women's Labor League across Canada as part of her work for the CPC. She was secretary of the Federation of Women's Labour Leagues starting in 1921 until her death in 1929 and also served as president of the Toronto Chapter. As part of her work, she launched The Women Worker, a monthly magazine aimed at Canadian women. Due in large part to her efforts, the number of league chapters had increased to 37 nationally in 1927. The Woman Worker had a broad readership that included working-class women, as well as women with a general interest in socialism and Marxist ideas. Through the publication and her work as secretary of the Federation, she wielded considerable influence over the chapters, some argue more than the CPC leadership was ever able to assert.

In her role as secretary of the CPC and her roles on the Toronto Labour Council, Constance was often a featured speaker at labour events in Toronto and across North America. As editor of The Woman Worker, and as a public figure in Toronto labour circles, she is described as one historian as "one of the strongest intellectuals in the Party." In her role as editor and public speaker, she was able to put forward issues and stories of interest to working-class women, including: access to birth control, minimum wage abuse, wrongful dismissal, wage theft, and the criminalization of poverty and mental illness. She also raised relief funds for striking Nova Scotia miners.

== Later life and death ==
As Constance's power and influence grew through her work with Women's Labour League, The Woman Worker, and the Women's Guild of the Amalgamated Carpenters, concern and suspicion grew amongst the inner circle of the party. The Women's Labour League was excluded from the Toronto Labour Council in 1927 during an anti-communist campaign, prompting Constance to comment that "The council is becoming altogether too conservative [...] they may soon rue their action. Their leaders fear us because they have no control over us." In early 1929, Pro-Stalin CPC members targeted Custance, as her values were seen as more feminist than communist. While she was not expelled from the party, scholars have noted that Custance was pushed out of the inner circle, and was criticized internally by party members for harboring what was interpreted as reformist (rather than revolutionary) ideals. Pro-Stalin CPC members also distrusted Constance's association with Alexandra Kollantai. She was removed from the Central Executive Committee in 1929.

Custance suffered declining health in the late 1920s. Suffering from physical exhaustion, she was ordered to three months rest in October 1928. She was removed as editor of The Woman Worker and from her role on the Canadian Labour Defense League in January 1929, with the publication citing an unspecified illness. In July 1929, she was admitted to Grace Hospital, where she died a week later, the death certificate noting periodotitis as the cause of death.

== Electoral politics ==
In 1925, Florence ran unsuccessfully for city council in Ward 8 (East Toronto). When she attempted to run for school trustee in 1926, she was disqualified (along with another candidate, Mrs. Adelaide Blumptree) as they both were not listed on assessment rolls in their districts. In 1926 she ran on a platform that would eliminate cadet training for working class youth in Toronto schools. In both elections, candidates called her out as a communist, and newspaper editors characterized her as "untried" and "freakish".

== Works cited ==
- Khouri, Malek (2007). Filming Politics: Communism and the Portrayal of the Working Class at the National Film Board of Canada, 1939-46. University of Calgary Press. ISBN 9781552381991.
