= Donald James Cowan =

Canadian politician

Donald James Cowan QC
- In office 1926–1935
- Constituency: Port Arthur—Thunder Bay

Personal details
- Born: January 3, 1883 Drumbo, Blenheim Township, Oxford County, Ontario, Canada
- Died: January 14, 1964 (aged 81) Brantford, Ontario, Canada
- Party: Conservative
- Spouse: Edith Ruby Anderson (m. 1912)
- Occupation: Lawyer, politician, judge

Donald James Cowan QC (January 3, 1883 – January 14, 1964) was a Canadian lawyer and politician. He represented Port Arthur—Thunder Bay in the House of Commons of Canada.

Born in Drumbo, Blenheim Township, Oxford County, Ontario, Cowan was the son of James D. Cowan and Elizabeth Taylor. Educated in Galt, at the University of Toronto and Osgoode Law School, he established a law practice in Port Arthur, Ontario, in 1908. In 1912, Cowan married Edith Ruby Anderson. He served three years 1913–1915 as an alderman and two years as mayor 1916–1917. Subsequently, he was city solicitor from January 1919 to November 1934. Cowan was appointed Crown attorney for Thunder Bay District, Ontario, in November 1925. In 1928, he was named King's Counsel. He was elected to the House of Commons as a Conservative in September 1926 and again in 1930. During his two terms in Parliament, he was a member of a select committee appointed to study possible amendments and changes to the British North America Act and promoted a Seaway treaty with the United States. In July 1935 he was rewarded by Prime Minister R. B. Bennett with the judgeship of Brant County, Ontario, only the third judge of that county since 1853. Cowan died in Brantford, Ontario, in 1964.
