= William Fitzgerald Langworthy =

Canadian politician (1867–1951)

William Fitzgerald Langworthy KC

Member of Parliament for Port Arthur—Thunder Bay
- In office October 1925 – July 1926

Personal details
- Born: William Fitzgerald Langworthy; 25 December 1867 Manchester, England
- Died: 28 September 1951 (aged 83)
- Party: Conservative
- Spouse(s): Marian Sellers m. 1 March 1893
- Profession: Barrister, crown attorney

William Fitzgerald Langworthy, KC (25 December 1867 – 28 September 1951) was a Conservative member of the House of Commons of Canada.

== Life ==
Born in Manchester, England, he received his education there before becoming a barrister and crown attorney.

He moved to Canada in 1880 and studied further at Port Arthur, Ontario. From 1905 to 1925 he was a Crown Attorney for the Thunder Bay district, and he received King's Counsel.

He was elected to Parliament at the Port Arthur—Thunder Bay riding in the 1925 general election. After completing one term, the 15th Canadian Parliament, Langworthy left federal politics and did not seek re-election in the 1926 vote.
