= Canadian Labour Defence League =

- Abbreviation: CLDL
- Formation: 1925
- Dissolved: 1940 (banned)
- Type: Legal advocacy organization
- Purpose: Advocate and public voice, educator and network
- Headquarters: Ottawa, Ontario, Canada
- Region served: Canada
- National Secretary: A. E. Smith
- Parent organization: International Labor Defense

The Canadian Labour Defence League (CLDL) was a legal defence organization founded and led by A. E. Smith. The league was in 1925 as a civil rights organization dedicated to protecting striking workers from persecution. It was allied with the Communist Party of Canada and functioned as a front for the party. The group was the Canadian affiliate of International Red Aid.

The CLDC had 52 groups affiliated with it by 1927 with a combined membership of 3,000 people. By 1933, it had 350 branches across Canada with a membership of 17,0000. It reached its height during the Great Depression "promoting communist policies, agitating on behalf of the CPC and defending in courts over six thousand individuals who had ventured astray of the law because of their militant labour activities."

In addition to defending strikers, the CLDL also campaigned to remove section 98 of the Criminal Code which banned "unlawful associations" such as the Communist Party and other radical groups and had empowered the government to deport non-citizens involved in radical politics.

The CLDL was very active in the early 1930s raising $180,000 and collecting over 450,000 signatures in support of eight leaders of the Communist Party, including leader Tim Buck, who had been arrested and charged with sedition.

The group became less active as the end of the decade approached and was banned in 1940 under the Defence of Canada Regulations.

== See also ==
- International Labor Defense, the CLDL's sister organization in the United States
