= Gaozi =

4th-century BCE Chinese philosopher

Gaozi (Chinese: 告子; pinyin: Gàozǐ; Wade–Giles: Kao-tzu; lit. 'Master Gao'; ca. 420-350 BCE), or Gao Buhai (告不害), was a Chinese philosopher during the Warring States period. Gaozi's teachings are no longer extant, but he was a contemporary of Mencius (ca. 372-289 BCE), and most of our knowledge about him comes from the Mencius book (6) titled "Gaozi".

Warring States philosophers disputed whether human nature is originally good (Mencius) or evil (Xunzi). The "Gaozi" chapter begins with a famous metaphor about a type of willow tree (杞柳 (qǐliǔ)). (Qi was also an ancient place name, best known through the four-character idiom '杞人憂天' [qǐrényōutiān, "person from Qi who worried heaven might fall"] "groundless fears; superfluous worry".)

The philosopher [Gao] said, 'Man's nature is like the [qi]-willow, and righteousness is like a cup or a bowl. The fashioning benevolence and righteousness out of man's nature is like the making cups and bowls from the [qi]-willow.'

Mencius replied, 'Can you, leaving untouched the nature of the willow, make with it cups and bowls? You must do violence and injury to the willow, before you can make cups and bowls with it. If you must do violence and injury to the willow in order to make cups and bowls with it, on your principles you must in the same way do violence and injury to humanity in order to fashion from it benevolence and righteousness! Your words, alas! would certainly lead all men on to reckon benevolence and righteousness to be calamities.'

The philosopher [Gao] said, 'Man's nature is like water whirling round in a corner. Open a passage for it to the east, and it will flow to the east; open a passage for it to the west, and it will flow to the west. Man's nature is indifferent to good and evil, just as the water is indifferent to the east and west.'

Mencius replied, 'Water indeed will flow indifferently to the east or west, but will it flow indifferently up or down? The tendency of man's nature to good is like the tendency of water to flow downwards. There are none but have this tendency to good, just as all water flows downwards. Now by striking water and causing it to leap up, you may make it go over your forehead, and, by damming and leading it you may force it up a hill - but are such movements according to the nature of water? It is the force applied which causes them. When men are made to do what is not good, their nature is dealt with in this way.' (6A, tr. James Legge, 1895:394-396 )
