= William Moriarty =

Canadian communist leader (1890–1936)

William "Bill" Moriarty (1890 – April 14, 1936) was a Canadian Communist and Right Oppositionist. He was general secretary of the Communist Party of Canada from 1921 to 1923.

Moriarty was born in London, England, and became a trade unionist working as a tin miner in Cornwall, a railway worker and then a miner in Wales. He moved to Canada in 1912 and worked first as a harvest worker. He joined the Socialist Party of Canada becoming involved in its left wing and was one of the founding members of the Communist Party of Canada and was elected to the Central Executive Committee at its founding convention May 1921 and was the first general secretary of the Workers' Party of Canada which was the legal wing of the underground Communist Party. He remained one of the leading members of the Communist Party throughout the 1920s and was elected to the executive of the Communist International in 1925. He was expelled from the party in 1930 as a supporter of the "Right Opposition", pro-Bukharin, Jay Lovestone current in the Comintern.

He founded the Toronto-based Marxian Educational League which was a branch of Lovestone's Communist Party (Opposition) and the International Communist Opposition. The M.E.L. affiliated with the Ontario CCF in 1933. He was the M.E.L.'s delegate at the national Cooperative Commonwealth Federation convention that drafted the Regina Manifesto in 1933. Moriarty remained a member of Lovestone's international tendency until his death in 1936.
