= Section 98 =

Former Canadian ban on unlawful associations

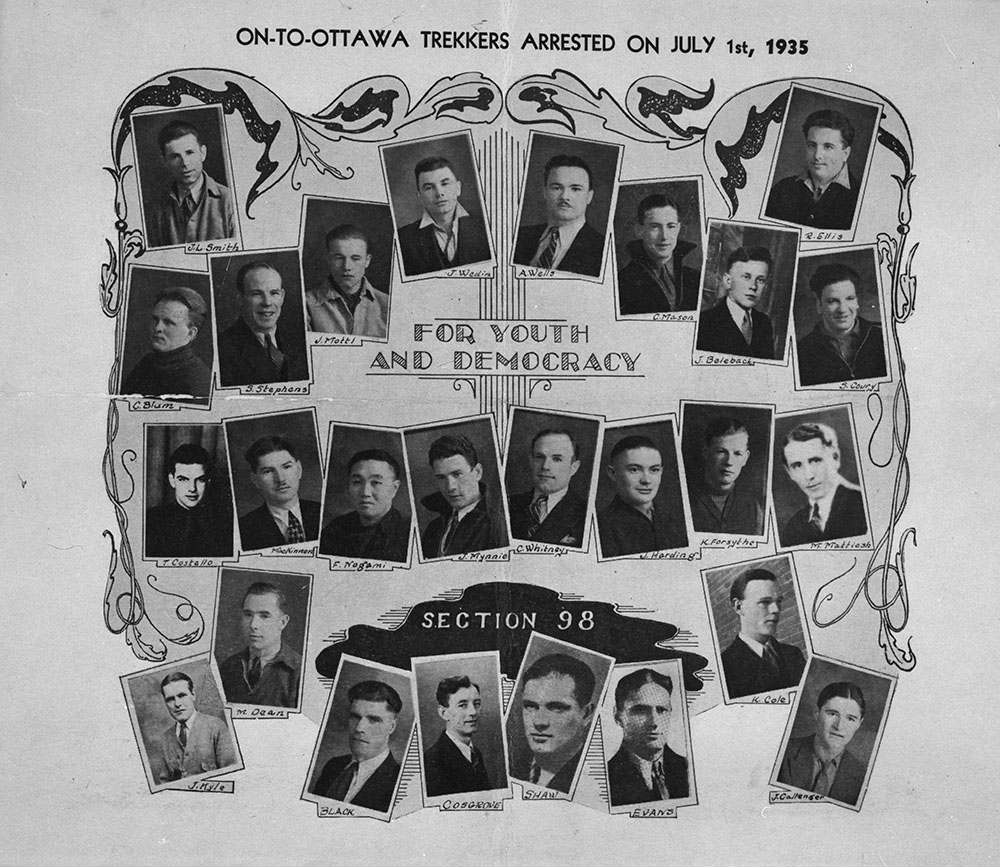
A poster made by the Communist Party of Canada, illustrating participants in the On-to-Ottawa Trek who were arrested under Section 98

Section 98 (s. 98) of the Criminal Code of Canada was a law enacted after the Winnipeg general strike of 1919 banning "unlawful associations." It was used in the 1930s against the Communist Party of Canada.

After the Winnipeg general strike of 1919, Arthur Meighen, Minister of Justice in the government led by Prime Minister Robert Borden, introduced an amendment to the Criminal Code. The legislation was tabled in the House of Commons on June 27, 1919, where it was passed with little to no debate. In the Senate, it passed in two days, going on to receive royal assent on July 7, 1919. Section 98 read:

Any association...whose professed purpose...is to bring about any governmental, industrial or economic change within Canada by use of force, violence or physical injury to person or property, or by threats of such injury, or which teaches, advocates, advises or defends the use of force, violence, terrorism, or physical injury to person or property...in order to accomplish such change, or for any other such purpose..., or which shall by any means prosecute or pursue such purpose...or shall so teach, advocate, advise or defend, shall be an unlawful association.

The law was extremely broad and carried a penalty of up to 20 years in prison. It was used throughout the 1920s and early half of the 1930s to harass Communists, other left parties and organizations, and labour unions generally. The most well-known use of Section 98 was in a crackdown designed to "strike a death blow at the Communist Party." The Royal Canadian Mounted Police and the Ontario Provincial Police rounded up eight leaders of the Communist Party on 11 August 1931. The Communists were subsequently convicted under the law and sentenced for up to five-year prison terms. In the years after the conviction, public opinion turned in favour of the Communists and against the law, which was opposed by liberals and moderate leftists as well as far-left organizations like the Canadian Labour Defence League, a Communist legal defence committee. As a result of public opposition, the Communists were released early from jail and Prime Minister Mackenzie King's government repealed the law in 1936.

Opposition to Section 98 was an important campaign for crystallizing an early civil rights movement within an otherwise fractured left wing in Canada. Although the law was repealed, it served as the model for the Defence of Canada Regulations under the War Measures Act to suppress aliens and dissenters during the Second World War and during the October Crisis of 1970.

== Sources ==
- Berger, Thomas R. (1982). Fragile Freedoms: Human Rights and Dissent in Canada. Toronto: Clarke, Irwin & Company. ISBN 0772013586. Total pages: 298.
- Wright, Barry; Tucker, Eric; Binnie, Susan, eds. (2015). Canadian State Trials, Volume IV: Security, Dissent, and the Limits of Toleration in War and Peace, 1914–1939. Toronto: University of Toronto Press. ISBN 9781442631083. Total pages: 464.
