= Communist Party of Canada =

Federal political party

Communist Party of Canada Parti communiste du Canada
- Abbreviation: CPC; PCC
- Leader: Drew Garvie
- Founded: May 28, 1921; 105 years ago
- Headquarters: 290A Danforth Avenue; Toronto, Ontario; M4K 1N6
- Newspaper: People's Voice
- Youth wing: Young Communist League of Canada (Note: The Young Communist League of Canada is nominally independent from the Communist Party of Canada.)
- Ideology: Communism; Marxism–Leninism
- Political position: Far-left
- International affiliation: Comintern (1921–1943); IMCWP (since 1998)
- Colours: Red
- Senate: 0 / 105
- House of Commons: 0 / 343

Website
- communist-party.ca

The Communist Party of Canada (CPC; French: Parti communiste du Canada, PCC) is a federal political party in Canada. It adheres to Marxism–Leninism, a variant of communism, and sits on the far-left of the Canadian political spectrum. Founded in 1921 under conditions of illegality, it is the second oldest active political party in Canada, after the Liberal Party of Canada. Although it does not currently have any parliamentary representation, the party's candidates have previously been elected to the House of Commons, the Ontario legislature, the Manitoba legislature, and various municipal governments across the country.

The Communist Party of Canada focuses on contributing to the "labour and people's movements" through extra-parliamentary activity. Throughout its history, the party has made significant contributions to Canada's trade union, labour, and peace movements. The Communist Party of Canada participates in the International Meeting of Communist and Workers' Parties.

In 1993, Elections Canada deregistered the party and seized its assets in accordance with changes to the Canada Elections Act introduced by the Conservative government of Brian Mulroney. Then party leader Miguel Figueroa subsequently began what would become a successful thirteen-year-long legal battle against the changes, which were struck down by the Supreme Court of Canada in Figueroa v. Canada (AG).

== History ==
=== Origins (1921–1928) ===
Between May 23 and 25, 1921, local communists and socialists held clandestine meetings in a barn behind a farmhouse (owned by Elizabeth Farley) at 257 Metcalfe Street, then in the outskirts of Guelph, Ontario. A Royal Canadian Mounted Police (RCMP) officer, working undercover, attended the meetings. His report states that delegates attended from "Winnipeg, Vancouver, Hamilton, Toronto, Montreal, Sudbury and Regina" and that Soviet Russia had offered to provide funding for the group. In addition to Guelph resident Fred Farley, a member of the United Communist Party of America, the attendees named in the RCMP report included Thomas J. Bell (a lithographer born in Ireland), Lorne Cunningham (an alderman), Trevor Maguire (one of the few in the group who was born in Canada) and Florence Custance (a teacher from Toronto). The group was "incessantly praising the Soviet Government of Russia, and urging the overthrow of the Government of Canada", according to the police report.

The Communist Party of Canada (CPC) was subsequently founded on May 28, 1921. Many of its founding members had worked as labour organizers and as anti-war activists and had belonged to groups such as the Socialist Party of Canada, One Big Union, the Socialist Labour Party, the Industrial Workers of the World, and other socialist, Marxist, or Labour parties or clubs and organizations. The first members felt inspired by the Russian Revolution, and radicalized by the negative aftermath of World War I and the fight to improve living standards and labour rights, including the experience of the Winnipeg General Strike. The Comintern accepted the party as its Canadian section in December 1921; thus, the CPC adopted an organizational structure and policy similar to other communist parties at the time.

The party alternated between legality and illegality during the 1920s and 1930s. Because of the War Measures Act in effect at its time of creation, the party operated as the "Workers' Party of Canada" in February 1922 as its public face. The following month, it began publishing a newspaper entitled The Worker. When Parliament allowed the War Measures Act to lapse in 1924, the underground organization was dissolved and the party's name was changed back to the "Communist Party of Canada".

In Alberta, miner Philip Christophers, who would become a founding member of the Workers' Party in 1922, was elected to the provincial legislature in 1921 as a Dominion Labor Party candidate; he was re-elected in 1926.

The party's first actions included establishing a youth organization, the Young Communist League of Canada (YCL), and solidarity efforts with the Soviet Union. By 1923, the party had raised over $64,000 for the Russian Red Cross (approximately $1,150,000 in 2026). It also initiated a Canadian component of the Trade Union Educational League (TUEL) which quickly became an organic part of the labour movement with active groups in 16 of 60 labour councils and in mining and logging camps. By 1925, party membership stood at around 4,500 people, composed mainly of miners and lumber workers, and of railway, farm, and garment workers. Most of these people came from immigrant communities like Finns and Ukrainians.

The party, working with the TUEL, played a role in many bitter strikes and difficult organizing drives, and in support of militant industrial unionism. From 1922 to 1929, the provincial sections of the WPC/CPC also affiliated with the Canadian Labour Party, another expression of the CPC's "united front" strategy. The CLP operated as a federated labour party. The CPC came to lead the CLP organization in several regions of the country, including Quebec, and did not run candidates under its own name in elections. In 1925 William Kolisnyk became the first communist elected to public office in North America, under the banner of the CLP, in 1927 when he was elected to the Winnipeg city council. The CLP itself, however, never became an effective national organization. The CPC withdrew from the CLP in 1928–1929 following a shift in Comintern policy, and the CLP folded shortly afterwards, being one of the founding organizations of the Cooperative Commonwealth Federation, which formed in 1932.

==== Debates, arguments, and expulsions ====
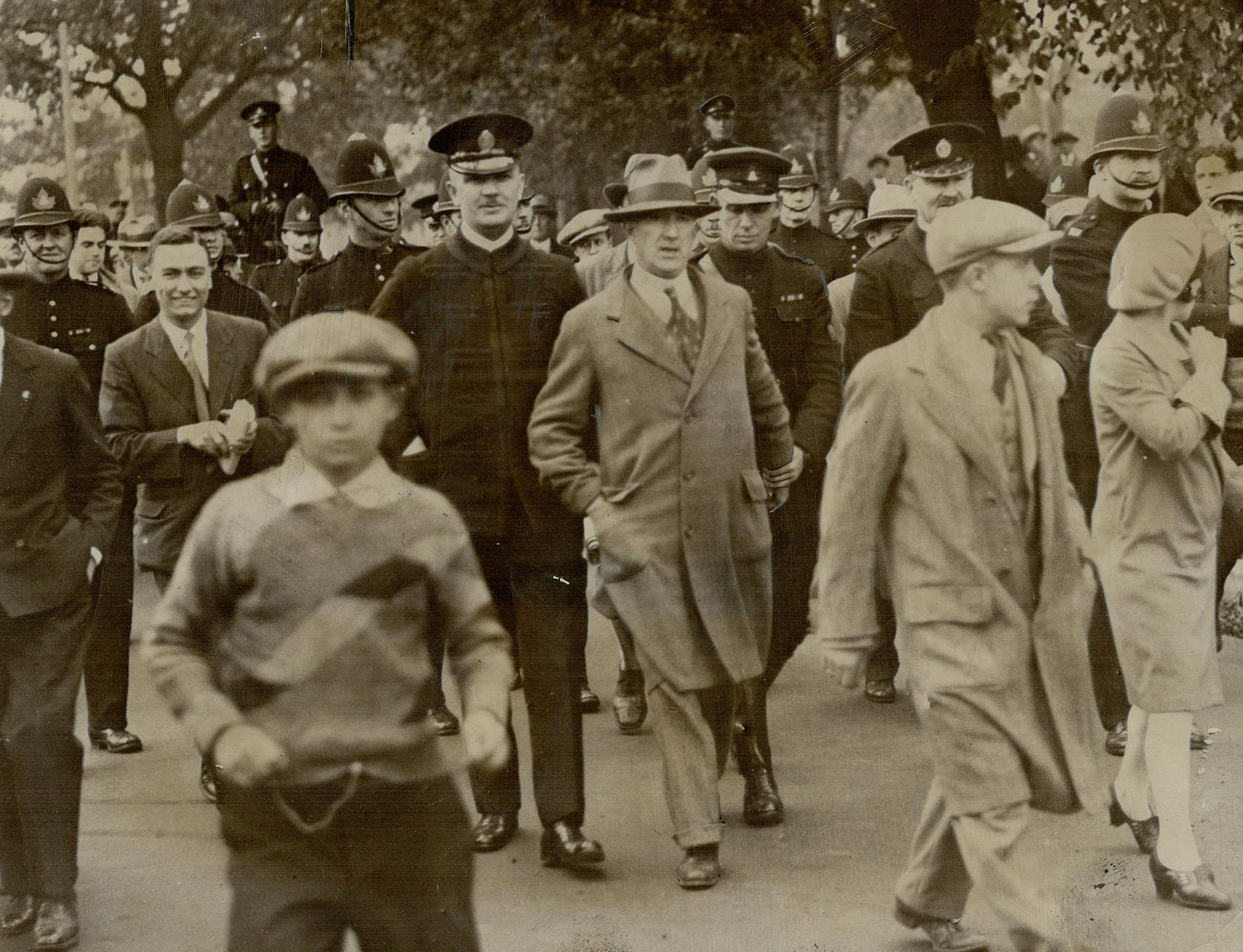
Jack MacDonald escorted away by police after a failed attempt to hold a free speech rally in Queen's Park, Toronto, 1929.

From 1927 to 1929, the party went through a series of policy debates and internal ideological struggles in which advocates of the ideas of Leon Trotsky, as well as proponents of what the party called "North American Exceptionism", were expelled. Expellees included Maurice Spector, the editor of the party's paper The Worker and party chairman, and Jack MacDonald (who had supported Spector's expulsion) who resigned as the party's general secretary for factionalism, and was expelled. The Secretary of the Women's Bureau and later, general editor of the Woman Worker (1926–1929) Florence Custance was only saved from expulsion from the Party due to her untimely death in 1929. Her feminism and advocacy of birth control, for example, were well known to the mainstream press, but her radical contemporaries questioned her political sympathies and gave her few chances to shine.

MacDonald, also sympathetic to Trotskyist ideas, joined Spector in founding the International Left Opposition (Trotskyist) Canada, which formed part of Trotsky's so-called Fourth International Left Opposition. The party also expelled supporters of Nikolai Bukharin and of Jay Lovestone's Right Opposition, such as William Moriarty. The CPC disagreed internally over strategy, tactics, the socialist identity of the Soviet Union, and over Canada's status as an imperialist power. While some communists like J. B. Salsberg expressed sympathy with these positions, the vast majority of members had decided to continue with the party by the early 1930s, after debates that dominated party conventions for a couple of years.

Tim Buck was elected as party general secretary in 1929. He remained in the position until 1962.

=== Great Depression (1929–1938) ===
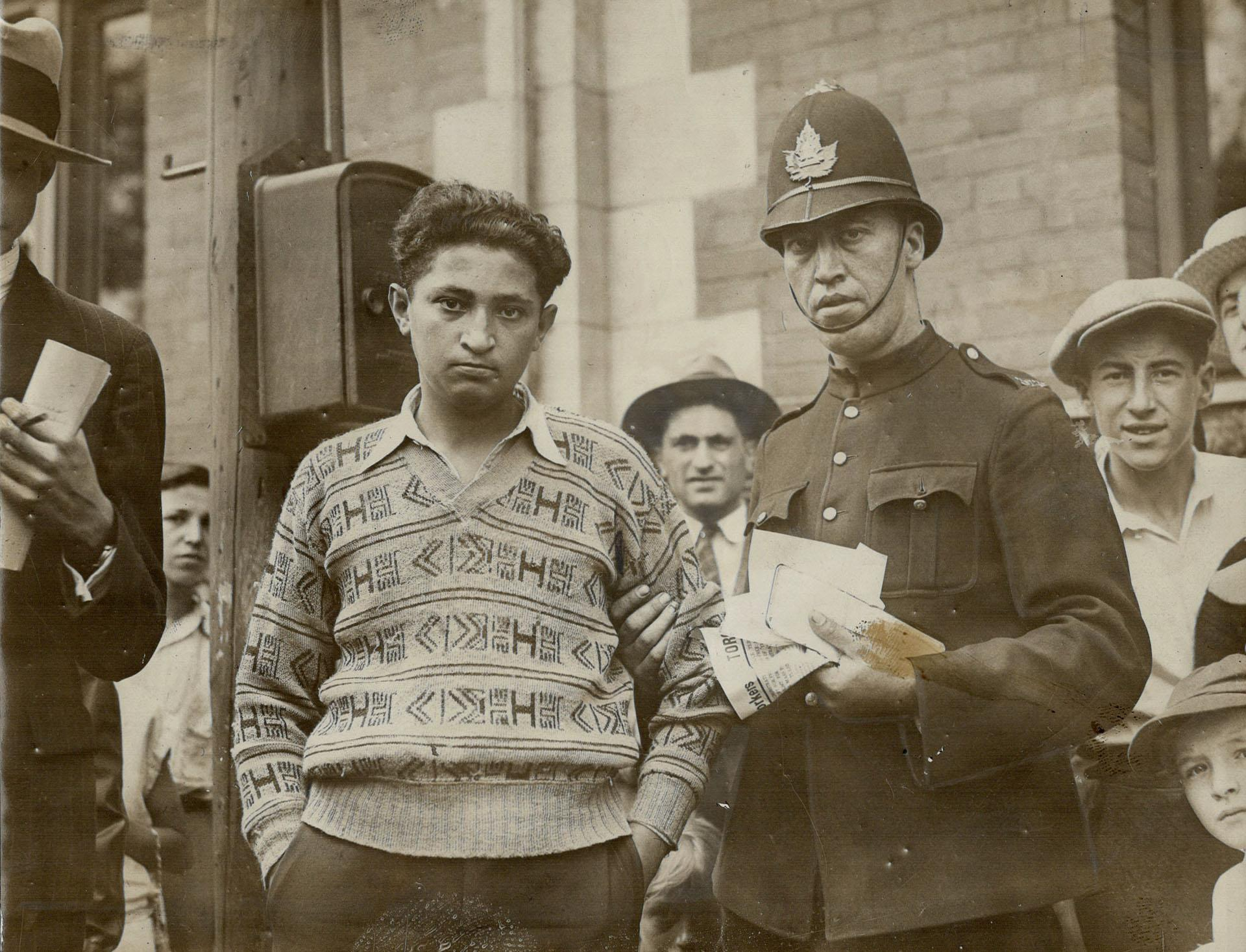
A member of the CPC's Toronto club is arrested for distributing party literature, August 12, 1929.

The stock market crash in late 1929 signalled the beginning of a long and protracted economic crisis in Canada and internationally. The crisis quickly led to widespread unemployment, poverty, destitution, and suffering among working families and farmers. The general election of 1930, brought to power the R.B. Bennett Conservative government which attacked the labour movement and established "relief camps" for young unemployed men.

The CPC made a systemic critique of the depression as an alleged crisis of capitalism. It was also the first political party in Canada to call for the introduction of unemployment insurance, a national health insurance scheme, universally accessible education, social and employment assistance to youth, labour legislation including health and safety regulations, regulation of the working day and holidays, a minimum wage for women and youth, and state-run crop insurance and price control for farmers.

The party's offices were raided by the RCMP. Further, eight party members were arrested, including Buck and Tom McEwen, under Section 98 of Canada's Criminal Code, which outlawed advocacy of force or violence to bring about political change. The party and the Workers' Unity League (WUL) launched a campaign calling for their release and presented a petition with 450,000 signatures to Prime Minister R. B. Bennett in November 1933. They demanded the release of the prisoners, an investigation into Buck's attempted murder, and the repeal of Section 98. After the prisoners were released a rally was held in Maple Leaf Gardens in 1934, with 17,000 in attendance and 8,000 unable to attend due to there not being enough space. Eight Men Speak was created based on the events.

Although the party was banned, it organized large mass organizations such as the WUL and the Canadian Labour Defence League, which played an important role in historic strikes like that of miners in Estevan. From 1933 to 1936, the WUL led 90% of the strikes in Canada. Already, conditions had taught social democrats, reformists, and the communists important lessons of cooperation. In 1934, in accordance with the re-examined position of the Comintern, the CPC adopted a strategy and tactics based on a united front against fascism.

In the prairies, communists organized the Farmers Unity League, which mobilized against farm evictions. They rallied hundreds or thousands of farmers into demonstration Hunger Marches that encountered police brutality. In 1936, James Litterick was elected as an MLA for Winnipeg, the first CPC member to be elected to Manitoba's legislature. In the legislature, Litterick advocated shifting the tax burden from working people to corporations, increasing unemployment relief, creating jobs through public works and infrastructure spending, and establishing public health insurance.

Party members were also active in the Congress of Industrial Organizations' attempt to unionize the auto and other industrial sectors including Steelworkers, the Canadian Seamen's Union, the Mine, Mill and Smelter Workers Union, the International Woodworkers of America, and the United Electrical, Radio and Machine Workers of America.

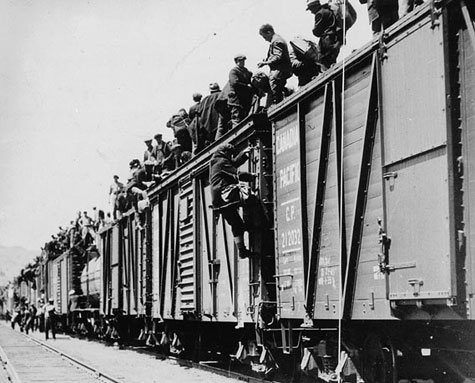
Strikers of the On-to-Ottawa Trek

Among the poor and unemployed, communists organized groups like the left-wing Workers Sports Association, one of the few ways that working-class youth had access to recreational programmes. The Relief Camp Workers' Union and the National Unemployed Workers Association played significant roles in organizing the unskilled and the unemployed in protest marches and demonstrations and campaigns such as the On-to-Ottawa Trek and the 1938 Vancouver Post Office sit-down strike.

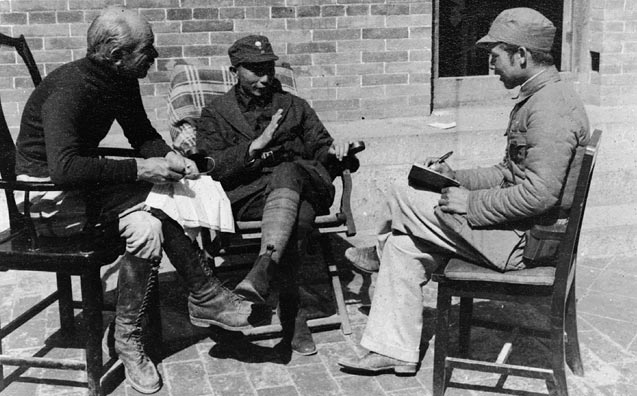
Dr. Norman Bethune in China, 1938

The party organized the mobilization of the Mackenzie-Papineau Battalion to fight in the Spanish Civil War as a part of the International Brigade. Among the leading Canadian communists involved was Norman Bethune, known for his invention of a mobile blood-transfusion unit, early advocacy of Medicare in Canada, and work with the Chinese Communist Party during the Second Sino-Japanese War.

Solidarity efforts for the Spanish Civil War and many labour and social struggles during the Depression resulted in much cooperation between members of the CPC and the Co-operative Commonwealth Federation (CCF). After 1935 the CPC advocated electoral alliances and unity with the CCF on key issues. The proposal was debated in the CCF, with the 1936 BC, Alberta and Saskatchewan conventions generally supporting cooperation while the Ontario convention opposed. While the motion was defeated at the CCF's third federal convention, the CPC continued to call for a united front.

The call was particularly urgent in Quebec, where in 1937 the Duplessis government passed "an act to protect Quebec against communist propaganda", which gave the police the power to padlock any premises used by "communists" (which was undefined in the legislation).

Another mass organization organized by the party was the Canadian League for Peace and Democracy, founded in 1934 as the Canadian League Against War and Fascism.

=== World War II (1939–1945) ===
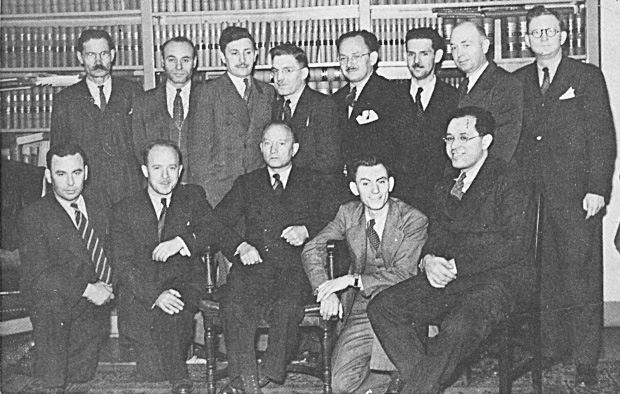
Meeting of party leaders in 1942. Front row, from left to right: Henri Gagnon, Fred Rose, Tim Buck, Émery Samuel and Sam Lipschitz. Back row, from left to right: Gus Sundqvist, William Kashtan, Évariste Dubé, James Litterick, Sam Carr, Willie Fortin, Stewart Smith and Stanley B. Ryerson.

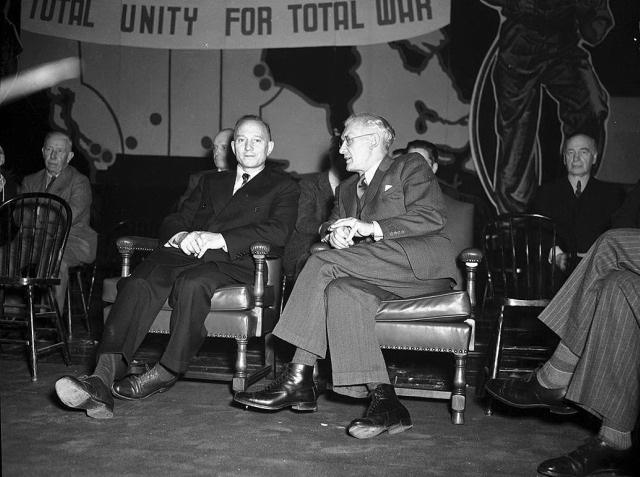
Tim Buck at a Communist Labour and Total War Committee meeting on October 13, 1942

Although the CPC had worked hard to warn Canadians about what it considered to be a growing fascist danger, the CPC saw the opening of World War II not as an anti-fascist war but a battle between capitalist nations. This was due to the Soviet Union having signed the Molotov–Ribbentrop Pact with Nazi Germany.

The CPC's opposition to World War II led to it being banned under the Defence of Canada Regulations of the War Measures Act in 1940 shortly after Canada entered into the war. In many cases communist leaders were interned in camps, long before fascists. As growing numbers of CPC leaders were interned, some members went underground or exile in the United States. Conditions in the camps were harsh. A civil rights campaign was launched by the wives of many of the interned men for family visits and their release.

Dorise Nielsen was elected to Parliament of Canada in the 1940 election, the only woman to be elected in that election, with the support of the CPC as a part of the Progressive Unity's popular front. Nielsen kept her membership in the party a secret until 1943. In the 1940s, 30% of members in Toronto, and 70% in Montreal, were Jewish.

With Germany's 1941 invasion of the Soviet Union and the collapse of the Molotov–Ribbentrop Pact, the party argued that the nature of the war had changed to a genuine anti-fascist struggle. The CPC reversed its opposition to the war and argued the danger to the working class on the international level superseded its interests nationally.

In Ontario, A. A. MacLeod and J. B. Salsberg were elected to the legislature in the 1943 Ontario general election as Labour candidates while the Communist Party remained illegal, and subsequently represented the newly formed Labor-Progressive Party. MacLeod was re-elected in 1945 and 1948, while Salsberg was re-elected in 1945, 1948 and 1951. Salsberg played a role in the adoption of Ontario's 1944 Racial Discrimination Act, having pressed for legislation in response to racial and antisemitic discrimination, including restrictions against Jews and Black people at public swimming pools.

Fred Rose was first elected to the Canadian House of Commons for Cartier in a 1943 by-election and was re-elected in 1945. During his time in Parliament, he introduced proposals for federal health insurance and legislation against racial and religious hatred.

During the Conscription Crisis of 1944, the banned CPC set up "Tim Buck Plebiscite Committees" across the country to campaign for a "yes" vote in the national referendum on conscription. Following the vote, the committees were renamed the Dominion Communist–Labour Total War Committee and urged full support for the war effort, a no-strike pledge for the duration of the war and increased industrial production. The National Council for Democratic Rights was also established with A.E. Smith as chair in order to rally for the legalization of the CPC and the release of communists and anti-fascists from internment.

=== Cold War era (1945–1991) ===
==== Party ban and the Labor-Progressives ====
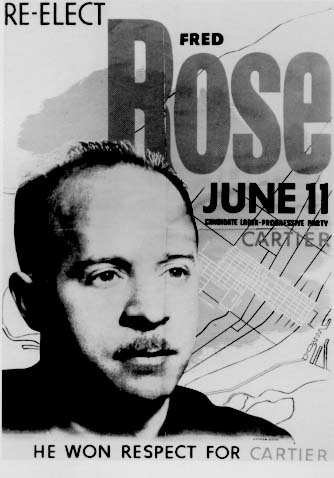
Fred Rose re-election poster

The CPC remained banned. However with the entry of the Soviet Union into the war and the eventual release of the Canadian party's interned leaders, Canadian communists founded the Labor-Progressive Party (LPP) in 1943 as a legal front; thereafter, the party ran candidates under that name until 1959. At its height in the mid-1940s, the party had fourteen sitting elected officials at the federal, provincial and municipal level. Several prominent elected party members were:

- Dorise Nielsen, a Saskatchewan MP elected as a Unity candidate in 1940, declared her affiliation with the LPP when it was formed in August 1943 and ran unsuccessfully for re-election as an LPP candidate.
- Mary Kardash and William Ross were LPP and then Communist school trustees in Winnipeg.
- Jacob Penner and Joseph Zuken were popular aldermen in Winnipeg. Zuken was an LPP school trustee before succeeding Penner on city council by which time the LPP had changed its name back to the Communist Party of Canada.
- Bill Kardash and James Litterick were Manitoba LPP Members of the Legislative Assembly (MLAs). Kardash was first elected in 1941 as a Workers Party candidate while the CPC was banned and was re-elected as a Labor-Progressive in 1945, 1949 and 1953 before being defeated in 1958.
- Alexander A. Parent was an LPP member and president of UAW Local 195, elected as the Liberal-Labour MPP for Essex North in 1945. Broke with the Liberals in 1946 and spent the remainder of his term as a Labour MPP working with the two LPP MPPs, MacLeod and Salsberg. He did not run for re-election in 1948.
- Stanley Bréhaut Ryerson, Sam Carr, Charles Simms and Norman Freed were LPP Toronto aldermen while Stewart Smith was elected to the city's Board of Control, Edna Ryerson, Elizabeth Morton and John Boyd were elected to the School Board in 1944.
- Harry Rankin sat on Vancouver's city council on behalf of the Committee of Progressive Electors which he helped found in the late 1960s. Though not officially a CPC member he was a fellow traveller.
- James Wallace was a councillor in the village of Long Branch, a Toronto suburb, from 1942 to 1952.
- The small rural municipality of Claydon, Saskatchewan, elected a Communist mayor to one of its tiny towns.
- Blairmore, Alberta, elected a Communist majority town council and school board in 1933 and renamed the main street "Tim Buck Boulevard" and the main park "Karl Marx Park". The Communist administration introduced tax and policing reforms, restored relief payments for unemployed residents and expanded local public-health services.
- Andrew Bileski was elected to the Winnipeg School Board and later served on Winnipeg City Council. He was a school trustee from 1933 to 1939, an alderman from 1939 to 1940, and returned to the school board from 1961 to 1964.
- In Vancouver, Communist Party member Bruce Yorke was elected to Vancouver City Council through the Coalition of Progressive Electors. First elected in 1980, he was subsequently re-elected several times.
- Other Communist school trustees elected in Toronto included Ruth Weir, Elizabeth Rowley, Elizabeth Hill and Stan Nemiroff. Hill served on the Toronto school board for several terms, while Nemiroff won a 2002 by-election and was re-elected in 2003.

In 1945, Igor Gouzenko, a cipher clerk at the Soviet Embassy, defected to Canada and alleged that several Canadian communists were operating a spy ring which provided the Soviet Union with top secret information. The Kellock-Taschereau Commission was called by Prime Minister William Lyon Mackenzie King to investigate the matter. This led to the convictions of Fred Rose and other communists.

Nikita Khrushchev's 1956 Secret Speech criticizing the rule of Joseph Stalin and the 1956 Soviet invasion of Hungary shook the faith of many communists around the world. The party was also riven by a crisis following the return of prominent party member J.B. Salsberg from a trip to the Soviet Union where he found rampant party-sponsored antisemitism. Salsberg reported his findings but they were rejected by the party, which suspended him from its leading bodies. The crisis resulted in the departure of the United Jewish Peoples' Order, Salsberg, Robert Laxer and most of the party's Jewish members in 1956. Many, perhaps most, members of the CPC left, including a number of prominent party members.

In the mid-1960s, the United States Department of State estimated the party membership to be approximately 3,500. The Soviet Union's 1968 invasion of Czechoslovakia caused more people to leave the CPC. Many women were likewise deterred from engaging with the party as it was somewhat resistant to women's politics at the time. The party may have countered that the discussions of sex, gender, and women's politics held the potential to veer away from the overarching goal of class revolution, for example, many radical women recalled the hypocrisy of party men who refused to discuss sex despite carrying on numerous extramarital affairs.

The party was also active in Indigenous people's struggles. For example, James P. Brady and Malcom Norris were founders of the Métis Associations of Saskatchewan and Alberta in the 1940s and 1950s.

==== Soviet Bloc collapse and party split ====
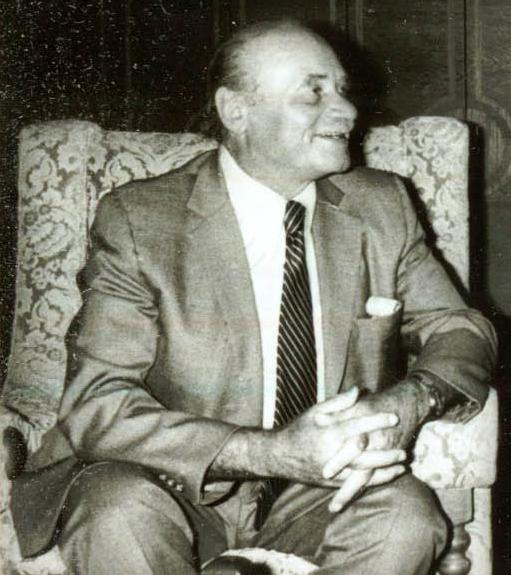
William Kashtan in 1978

In common with most communist parties, the CPC went through a crisis after the dissolution of the Soviet Union; subsequently, the party split. Under then-general secretary George Hewison (1988–1991), the leadership of the CPC and a segment of its general membership began to abandon Marxism–Leninism as the basis of the party's revolutionary perspective, and ultimately moved to liquidate the party itself, seeking to replace it with a more moderate entity.

The protracted ideological and political crisis created much confusion and disorientation within the ranks of the Party; it paralysed both its independent and united front work for over two years. The Hewison-led majority in the party's central committee voted to abandon Marxism–Leninism. An orthodox minority in the central committee, led by Miguel Figueroa, Elizabeth Rowley and former leader William Kashtan, resisted this effort. At the 28th Convention in the fall of 1990, the Hewison group managed to maintain its control of the central committee, but by the spring of 1991, the membership began to turn more and more against the reformist policies and orientation of the Hewison leadership.

Key provincial conventions were held in 1991 in the two main provincial bases of the CPC: British Columbia and Ontario. At the BC convention, delegates threw out Fred Wilson, one of the main leaders of the Hewison group. A few months later in June 1991, Ontario delegates rejected a concerted campaign by Hewison and his supporters, and overwhelmingly reelected provincial leader Elizabeth Rowley and other supporters of the Marxist–Leninist current to the Ontario Committee and Executive.

The Hewison group moved on August 27, 1991, to expel eleven of the key leaders of the opposition, including Rowley, Emil Bjarnason, and former central organizer John Bizzell. The Hewison-controlled Central Executive also dismissed the Ontario provincial committee.

The vast majority of local clubs and committees of the CPC opposed the expulsions, and called instead for an extraordinary convention of the party to resolve the deepening crisis in a democratic manner. There were loud protests at the central committee's October 1991 meeting, but an extraordinary convention was not convened. With few remaining options, Rowley and the other expelled members threatened to take the Hewison group to court. After several months of negotiations between the Hewison group and the opposition "All-Canada Negotiating Committee", an out-of-court settlement resulted in the Hewison leadership agreeing to leave the CPC and relinquish any claim to the party's name, while taking most of the party's assets to the Cecil-Ross Society, a publishing and educational foundation previously associated with the party.

Following the departure of the Hewison-led group, a convention was held in December 1992 at which delegates agreed to continue the CPC (thus the meeting was titled the 30th CPC Convention). Delegates rejected the reformist policies instituted by the Hewison group and instead reaffirmed the CPC as a Marxist–Leninist organization. Since most of the old party's assets were now the property of the Hewison-led Cecil Ross Society, the CPC convention decided to launch a new newspaper, the People's Voice, to replace the old Canadian Tribune. The convention elected a new central committee with Figueroa as Party Leader. The convention also amended the party constitution to grant more membership control and lessen the arbitrary powers of the central committee, while maintaining democratic centralism as its organizational principle.

Meanwhile, the former communists retained the Cecil-Ross Society as a political foundation to continue their political efforts. They also sold off the party's headquarters at 24 Cecil Street, having earlier liquidated various party-related business such as Eveready Printers (the party printshop) and Progress Publishers. The name of the Cecil-Ross Society comes from the intersection of Cecil Street and Ross Street in Toronto where the headquarters of the party was located. The Cecil-Ross Society took with it the rights to the Canadian Tribune, which had been the party's weekly newspaper for decades, as well as roughly half of the party's assets. The Cecil-Ross Society ended publication of the Canadian Tribune and attempted to launch a new broad-left magazine, New Times which failed after a few issues and then Ginger which was only published twice.

=== Recent history (1992–present) ===
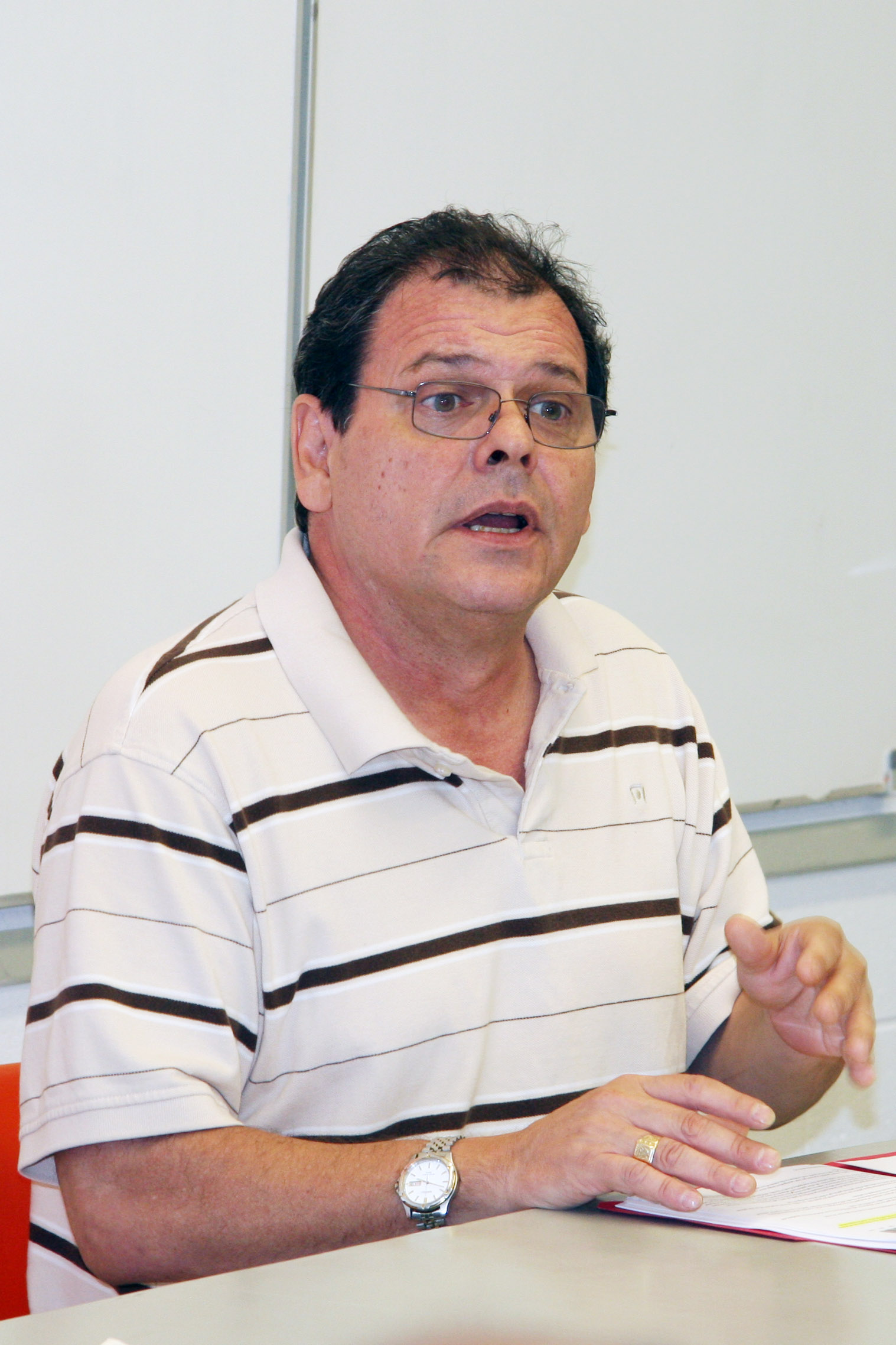
Miguel Figueroa led a successful campaign against the deregistration of minor political parties in Figueroa v. Canada (AG).

The renovated party, although with a much smaller membership and resources, now faced further challenges and threats to its existence. Changes to the Canada Elections Act, introduced by the Conservative government of Brian Mulroney and passed by Parliament in the spring of 1993, required that any political party which failed to field 50 candidates in a general federal election would be automatically deregistered and its assets seized. The CPC was not in a position to run 50 candidates in the 1993 federal election (it fielded only eight candidates during that election); therefore, its assets were seized and the party was deregistered. The CPC had sought an interim injunction to prevent its imminent de-registration; however. this legal action failed.

A prolonged ten-year political and legal battle, Figueroa v. Canada (AG) ensued, which won the support of widespread popular opinion, reflected in a number of members of parliament openly supporting the challenge and other small political parties joining the case, most notably the Green Party. Never before had a single court challenge resulted in legislative action on three separate occasions to amend a standing law. Bill C-2 (2000) amended the Canada Elections Act to (among other things) remove the unconstitutional seizure of party assets for failure to field 50 candidates in a general election and provided for the full refund of candidates' deposits. The party had its deregistration overturned and its seized assets restored. Bill C-9 (2001) reduced the threshold from 50 to 12 candidates for the party identifier to appear on the ballot. After the Supreme Court of Canada ruled unanimously to strike down the 50-candidate threshold as unconstitutional, the Chretien government was forced to introduce and pass Bill C-3 (2003), which scrapped the rule altogether for party registration. This victory was celebrated by many of the other small parties – regardless of political differences – on the principle that it was a victory for the people's right to democratic choice.

During this time the, CPC began to reorganize its Quebec section, the Communist Party of Quebec (Parti communiste du Québec or PCQ). The CPC also began periodically publishing Spark!, a journal for Marxist theory and discussion. In 2001 the party adopted a comprehensive update to its party programme and renamed it "Canada's Future is Socialism".

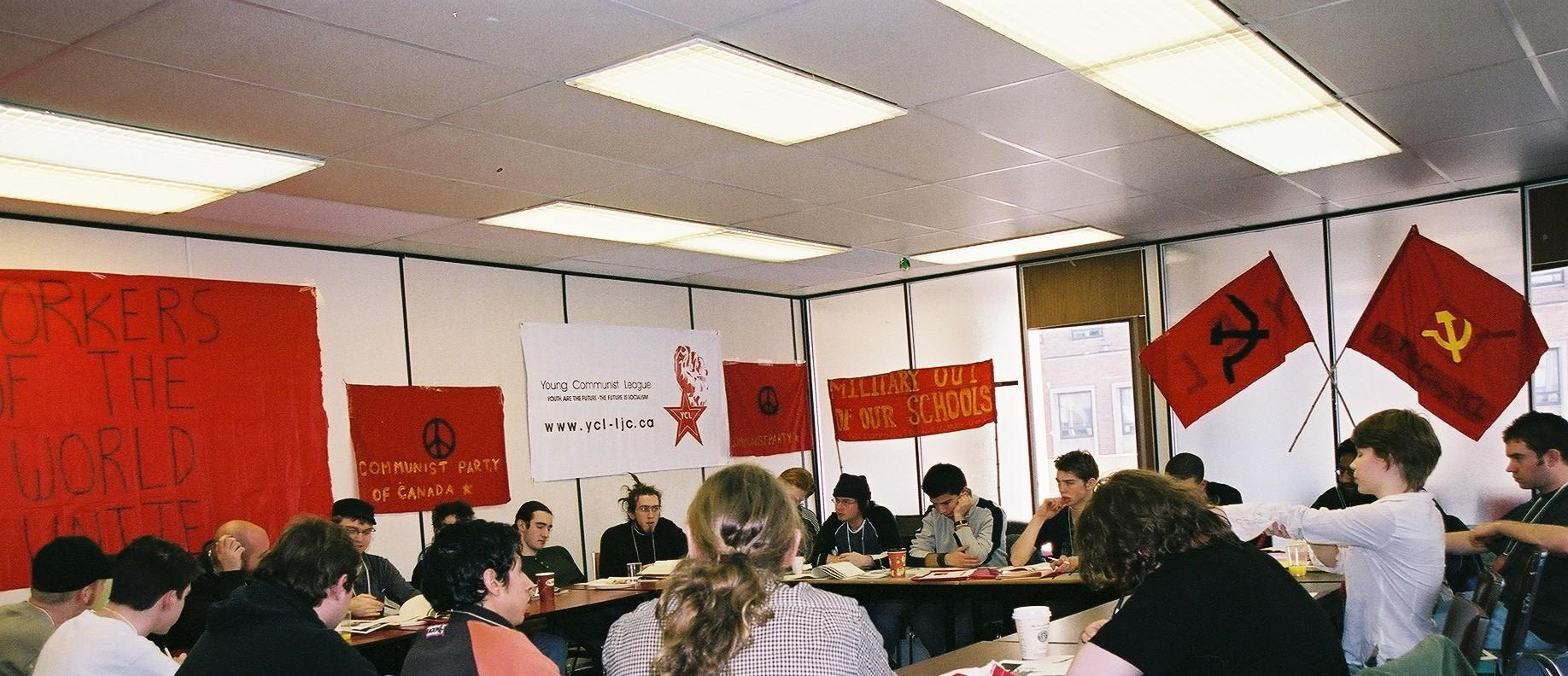
YCL rebuilding convention in Toronto, 2007

The CPC reinvigorated its long-standing involvement in and contribution to the labour movement and support of trade union organizing and campaigns, in the civic reform movement, and in a number of social justice, anti-war and international solidarity groups and coalitions. The YCL was reestablished in 2007. It has since set up local branches in a number of cities across Canada and held several central conventions.

The CPC held its 37th Central Convention in February 2013 in Toronto. According to a Toronto Star article the assembly drew 65 delegates most of whom were from Ontario, British Columbia and Quebec with a few from Alberta, Saskatchewan, Manitoba and Nova Scotia. Party leader Miguel Figueroa called for the CPC to field 25 candidates in the upcoming federal election.

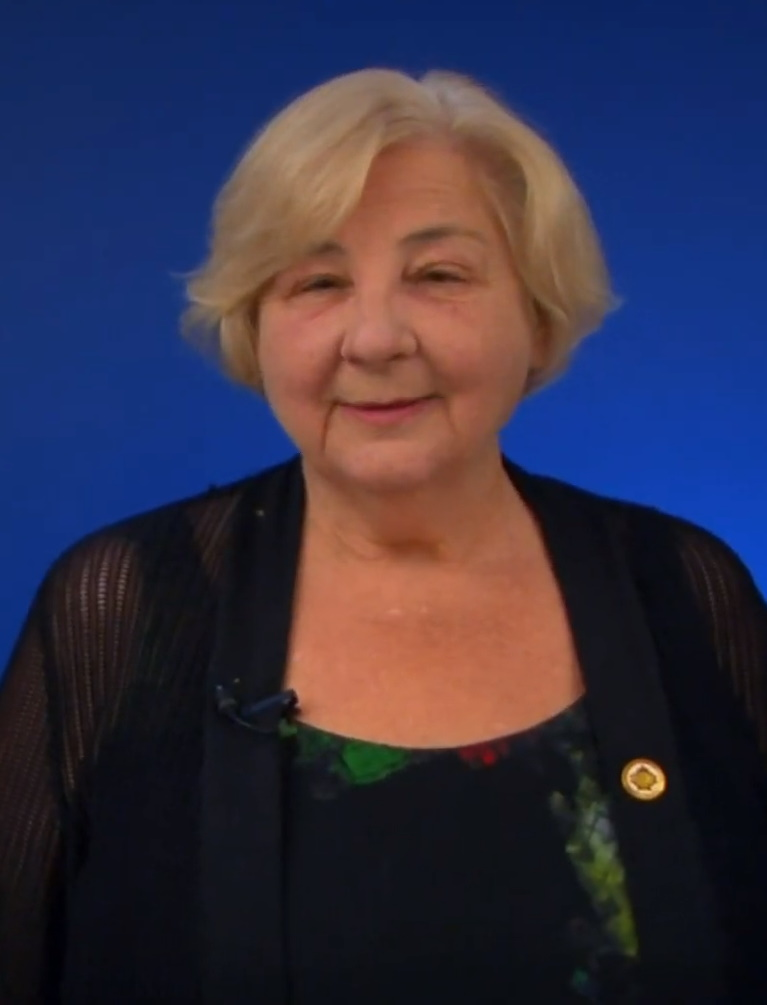
Elizabeth Rowley

Owing to his declining health, Miguel Figueroa stepped down as central party leader in 2015 after serving in the position for 23 years. Elizabeth Rowley subsequently became the first woman leader of the party after being elected central party leader by the central committee on January 31, 2016. Under Rowley's leadership, the party ran 30 candidates in the 2019 Canadian federal election and finished in twelfth, receiving 3,905 votes and a total of 0.02% of the popular vote.

The CPC held its 38th Central Convention in May 2016, again in Toronto. The meeting drew about 70–80 delegates from Ontario, British Columbia, Quebec, Manitoba, Alberta, Nova Scotia, Newfoundland and New Brunswick, in order of delegation size. The party held a special tribute to outgoing leader Miguel Figueroa.

In June 2022, allegations of sexual harassment by a party organizer surfaced on social media. The central committee's response was perceived as inadequate by some within the party. This resulted in an internal party schism that led to the resignations or expulsions of a number of party members.

Rowley retired as leader at the party's December 2025 national convention and was succeeded by Drew Garvie, a former general secretary of the Young Communist League who had been leader of the Communist Party of Ontario since 2019.

== Political positions ==
=== Quebec and the national question ===
The Communist Party of Canada began organizing in Quebec upon its founding. Many important leaders of the CPC including Annie Buller, William Kashtan, Fred Rose, Madeleine Parent, and Léa Roback hailed from Montreal, and Norman Bethune joined the party in Montreal. The Quebec district fought hard battles against the Duplessis regime, which made the party illegal using the Padlock Law, and to organize the unorganized. The election of Fred Rose in Cartier was a major boost to the Quebec communists and reflected the support of the CPC among working-class people in the city.

For some time the party had been struggling to develop its policy on the national question in Canada, which had changed considerably since the party's formation. As early as the 1930s the CPC recognized Quebec was a nation; by the late 1940s, the party began to advocate for Quebec's right to self-determination. In the 1950s and 1960s, the party clarified this position, becoming the first party to advocate for a democratic solution to the national question and a new "made-in-Canada" constitution that would guarantee sovereignty for Quebec, up to and including separation. While supporting the right to separate, the communists opposed the secession of Quebec from Canada, proposing a new equal and voluntary partnership between what was then commonly called French and English Canada.

In the late 1950s, the party finally overturned the Padlock Law, giving new energy and hope to the party despite difficult times with the Khrushchev revelations and the continued pressure of the Cold War. Moving to better put into practice what it saw as a deeper political understanding of the national question, the CPC in Quebec re-organized as the Communist Party of Quebec (Parti communiste du Québec or PCQ) in November 1965, reflecting what it now termed the multi-national reality of Canada as "a state with more than one nation within its borders". The PCQ emerged as a "distinct entity" of the CPC, with shared membership and, at the same time, full control over its policies and administration including its own constitution.

With the Quiet Revolution, Royal Commission on Bilingualism and Biculturalism and later the October Crisis, the party's position on the national question became the subject of broad debate across the country, and influenced the agreement of the Canadian Labour Congress to work with the Quebec Federation of Labour on an equal and voluntary basis. The communists called for workers sympathetic with independence movements to unite on a common, immediate class-based programme of common struggle with English-speaking Canadian workers. The PCQ helped re-launch Montreal's mass May Day demonstrations and advanced many unique policies including the idea of a federated party of labour, which proved its prescience with the formation of Québec solidaire. The federated party of labour proposal was endorsed by the late 1960s by most trade union centrals, but the project was eclipsed by the emergence of the Parti Quebecois.

By the 1980s, the CPC and PCQ were calling for "a new, democratic constitutional arrangement based on the equal and voluntary union of Aboriginal peoples, Québec, and English-speaking Canada" replacing the Senate with a house of nations. In this context the PCQ and CPC critically supported the first referendum question on sovereignty association, while later the CPC advocated voting No on the second referendum in 1995.

During the crisis in CPC during the 1990s, the PCQ became disorganized, closed its offices, and its remaining members drifted apart from the CPC, with many in the leadership adopting positions sympathetic to nationalism. It was not until 1997 that a range of communists and communist groups came together to re-organize the PCQ. A few years later the party helped bring together different tendencies in the left to form the Union of Progressive Forces (UFP) which became Québec solidaire.

The UFP agreed to place the question of Quebec independence as secondary to social or class issues. This was hotly debated as the party transformed into Québec solidaire. The debate moved over into the PCQ as well. These positions were questioned by the Quebec leader of the party, André Parizeau, who formulated a series of amendments in support of immediate independence in 2004 which were rejected by both the National Executive Committee (NEC) of the Quebec party (by a vote of 4–2) and by the Central Executive Committee of the Canadian party (by a vote of 7–1). In January 2005, Parizeau wrote a letter to PCQ members declaring that the party was in crisis and, describing the four NEC members who opposed his amendments as a pro-federalist "Gang of Four", he summarily dismissed them. Although his Quebec nationalist point of view held a slim majority at the PCQ's convention of April 2005, the delegate selection process was highly disputed. Parizeau was subsequently expelled by the Central Committee of the CPC for factionalism and actions harmful to the party. Around the same time, his group announced their withdrawal from the CPC. Élections Québec continued to recognize Parizeau as holding the electoral registration for the name "Parti communiste du Québec", prompting the PCQ to begin using the abbreviation PCQ-PCC to distinguish itself from Parizeau's group.

The party's central committee affirmed the authority of the previous PCQ National Executive Committee on June 18–19, 2005. The PCQ-PCC then held a new convention. This resulted in the revival of the French-language communist periodical Clarté, the opening of a new office and reading room, the launch of a new website, and the party's reaffiliation with Quebec Solidaire. The PCQ-PCC works closely with the youth organization Ligue de la jeunesse communiste du Quebec. The CPC's account of this situation is available online, as is the letter from Parizeau's PCQ group.

=== Ukraine ===
In 2014, the Communist Party of Canada made statements condemning the Revolution of Dignity, referring to it as a "criminal imperialist conspiracy to impose regime change" as well as a coup d'état orchestrated by "neo-fascist forces" backed by the United States and the European Union. It recognized Russia's annexation of Crimea, widely considered illegal by international observers. In 2022, the Communist Party of Canada released a statement expressing solidarity with the Kononovich brothers, two leaders of the Komsomol of Ukraine and members of the Antifascist Committee of Ukraine, organizations which are both affiliated with the banned Communist Party of Ukraine, a party with Russophilic and left-conservative views.

Upon the outbreak of Russia's full-scale invasion of Ukraine, the CPC released a statement advocating for a peaceful solution whilst condemning Canada's perceived role in escalating political tensions in the region. The statement uses the term "newly independent republics" to refer to the Donetsk and Luhansk People's Republics, two breakaway regions in eastern Ukraine which were recognized by Russia several days before Russia's full-scale invasion of Ukraine.

== Membership ==
I accept as my own the aim of the Communist Party to work unceasingly for the establishment of a socialist society in Canada, in which the principal means of producing and distributing wealth will be the common property of society as a whole, and where exploitation, want, poverty and insecurity will be ended forever.

— Communist Party of Canada initiation pledge

The CPC had a membership of about 4,500 people in 1925, consisting mainly of miners, lumberers, railway workers, farmers, and garment workers. Party membership soared in the 1940s, peaking at just under 20,000 in January 1946. However, during this time, the CPC's membership in Quebec only amounted to several hundred members.

Women made up 12 to 15% of the CPC's membership from 1934 to 1938, rising to 28% by 1951.

According to Canadian historian Ivan Avakumović, the CPC had 1,500 to 3,000 members during the 1960s. The United States Department of State meanwhile estimated the CPC's membership to be approximately 3,500 in the mid-1960s.

== Publications ==
The CPC publishes the biweekly newspaper People's Voice, which has been in circulation since 1993. The party's previous newspapers include The Worker, Canadian Tribune, and The Tribune.

Additionally, the CPC's British Columbia section published many newspapers of its own, such as the B.C. Worker's News (1935–1937), People's Advocate (1937–1940), Vancouver Clarion (1940–1941), Pacific Advocate (1942–1945), and Pacific Tribune (1946–1992).

== Allied organizations ==
Historically, the CPC has had allied organizations which were affiliated with the party until the late-1920s, when these affiliates were hitherto understood to be largely following the party's direction. These groups often originated from left-wing labour and socialist movements that existed prior to the creation of the Communist Party and operated political and cultural activities among various immigrant groups, published magazines and operated their own cultural centres and meeting halls. From the 1920s through the 1950s the largest immigrant groups represented in the party were Finns, Ukrainians and Jews who were organized in the Finnish Organization of Canada (founded in 1911 as the Finnish Socialist Organization of Canada), the Association of United Ukrainian Canadians (known as the Ukrainian Labour Farmer Temple Association until 1946) and the United Jewish Peoples' Order (known as the Labour League until 1945) respectively.

Also active in the 1930s and 1940s were the Hungarian Workers Clubs, the Polish People's Association (formerly the Polish Workers' and Farmers' Association and later known as the Polish Democratic Association after World War II), the Serbian People's Movement and Croatian Cultural Association (formerly the Jugoslav Workers' Clubs) and the Carpatho-Russian Society. The Russian Farmer-Worker Clubs were formed in the early 1930s but closed by the government under the Defence of Canada Regulations at the outbreak of World War II. When the Soviet Union became Canada's ally in 1942, they re-appeared as the Federation of Russian Canadians. The German Canadian Federation was formed during World War II and the Canadian Slav Committee was formed in 1948 in an attempt to put party-aligned cultural associations for Ukrainians, Russians, Poles, Slovaks, Bulgarians, Macedonians, Yugoslavs, and Carpatho-Rusyns under one umbrella.

The Society of Capartho-Russian Canadians re-formed and, in 1950, acquired a hall at 280 Queen Street West in Toronto which it continues to operate into the twenty-first century.

The UJPO broke with the party in 1956 during the period of the "Khrushchev revelations" and allegations of antisemitism in the Soviet Union following a visit to that country by J. B. Salsberg.

Later allied organizations include the Greek Canadian Democratic Organization formed by leftist emigres who had fled the Greek military junta of 1967–1974 and the Portuguese Canadian Democratic Association which was formed by left-wing emigres who had left Portugal in the 1960s and early 1970s when it was still ruled by a right wing dictatorship. The Portuguese association was outspoken in its support of the 1974 Carnation Revolution.

== Provincial sections ==
The Communist Party of Canada has provincial sections which contest general elections at the provincial level. In most provinces the provincial section's name is in the format "Communist Party of Canada ([Province])". Active provincial sections exist in Alberta, British Columbia, Manitoba, Ontario, and Quebec; the party was previously active in Saskatchewan as well.

Provincial sections of the Communist Party of Canada
Province	Section name	Founded	Leader	Best result
Alberta	Communist Party – Alberta	1930 (96 years ago)	Naomi Rankin	1944 (4.26% of pop. vote)
British Columbia	Communist Party of British Columbia	1945 (81 years ago)	Robert Crooks	1945 (3.52% of pop. vote)
Manitoba	Communist Party of Canada – Manitoba	1921 (105 years ago)	Andrew Taylor	1945 (4.80% of pop. vote, 1 seat won)
Ontario	Communist Party of Canada (Ontario)	1940 (86 years ago)	Drew Garvie	1945 (2.4% of pop. vote, 2 seats won)
Quebec	Communist Party of Quebec (Note: The Communist Party of Quebec is nominally independent from the Communist Party of Canada.)	1965 (61 years ago)	Adrien Welsh	1976 (0.05% of pop. vote)
Saskatchewan	Communist Party of Canada (Saskatchewan)	1938 (88 years ago)	N/A	1938 (4.17% of pop. vote)

denotes a defunct provincial section.

== Leadership ==
=== Party leaders ===
The following is a list of party leaders since 1921. The party leader was known as the "General Secretary of the Communist Party of Canada" from 1921 to 1992.

No.	Leader (birth–death)	Birthplace	Residence	Time in office (duration)
1	Tom Burpee (1885–1972)	Ontario		1921–1921 (7 months)
2	William Moriarty (1890–1936)	England	Ontario	1921–1923 (2 years)
3	Jack MacDonald (1888–1941)	Scotland	Ontario	1923–1929 (6 years)
4	Tim Buck (1891–1973)	England	Ontario	1929–1962 (33 years)
5	Leslie Morris (1904–1964)	England	Ontario	1962–1964 (2 years)
6	William Kashtan (1909–1992)	Quebec	Ontario	1965–1988 (23 years)
7	George Hewison (b. 1944)	British Columbia		1988–1992 (4 years)
8	Miguel Figueroa (b. 1952)	Quebec	Ontario	1992–2015 (23 years)
9	Elizabeth Rowley (b. 1949)	British Columbia	Ontario	2016–2025 (9 years)
10	Drew Garvie (b. 1985)	Alberta	Ontario	2025–present (350 days)

=== Chairmen ===
The Chairman of the Communist Party of Canada was a largely ceremonial position which existed from 1921 to 1973. The following is a list of known party chairmen.

No.	Leader (birth–death)	Birthplace	Residence	Time in office (duration)
1	Jack MacDonald (1888–1941)	Scotland	Ontario	1921–1923 (2 years)
2	Maurice Spector (1898–1968)	Russia	Ontario	19??–1928 (Unknown)
3	Bill Kardash (1912–1997)	Saskatchewan	Manitoba	1943–19?? (Unknown)
4	Tim Buck (1891–1973)	England	Ontario	1962–1973 (11 years)

=== Central convention ===
The party holds a central convention in Toronto every three years, in which delegates from party clubs across Canada elect the party leadership. Delegates elect the members of the Central Committee who in turn nominate the members of the Central Executive Committee (CEC). The composition of the CEC is then ratified by the delegates to the convention through a simple majority.

== Election results ==
At its height in the mid-1940s, the CPC had 14 sitting elected officials at the federal, provincial and municipal levels, including federal Member of Parliament Fred Rose, who was elected in 1945, the year in which the CPC's proportion of the federal election vote was its highest ever at 2.13%. In the 1953 federal election, the CPC ran 100 candidates, its most ever; however, it only received 1.06% of the national vote. Those 100 candidates encompassed seven provinces and included 22 women, as well as 11 young adults.

Election	Leader	Candidates	Seats won	Votes	Vote share	Rank
1930	Tim Buck	6 / 245	0	4,557	0.12%	10th
1935	Tim Buck	13 / 245	0	27,456	0.46%	▲8th
1940 (Note: Eight candidates ran as Communists; a ninth candidate, Dorise Nielsen, was a member of the Communist Party but ran and was elected as a Progressive Unity candidate and later joined the Labor-Progressive Party.)	Tim Buck	9 / 245	1 (Note: Includes Dorise Nielsen who ran and was elected as a Progressive Unity candidate and later joined the Labor-Progressive Party.)	14,005 (Note: 8,699 votes for candidates running as Communists plus 5,372 for Dorise Nielsen, a Progressive Unity candidate who belonged to the Communist Party and later joined the Labor-Progressive Party.)	0.36% (Note: Includes votes for Communist Dorise Nielsen running as a Progressive Unity.)	▼10th
Changed name from Communist Party to Labor-Progressive Party in 1943.
1945 (Note: The Communist Party of Canada was banned in 1940 under the Defence of Canada Regulations of the War Measures Act. As a result, it ran candidates under a legal front organization named the Labor-Progressive Party in the 1945, 1949, 1953, 1957 and 1958 elections.)	Tim Buck	68 / 245	1	111,892	2.13%	▲6th
1949	Tim Buck	17 / 262	0	32,623	0.56%	▼8th
1953	Tim Buck	100 / 265	0	59,622	1.06%	▲7th
1957	Tim Buck	10 / 265	0	7,760	0.12%	7th
1958	Tim Buck	18 / 265	0	9,769	0.13%	▲6th
Changed name from Labor-Progressive Party to Communist Party in 1959.
1962	Leslie Morris	12 / 265	0	6,360	0.08%	6th
1963	Leslie Morris	12 / 265	0	4,234	0.05%	6th
1965	William Kashtan	12 / 265	0	4,285	0.06%	6th
1968	William Kashtan	14 / 264	0	4,465	0.05%	▼7th
1972 (Note: In 1972, a new Elections Act came into effect which required a party to run at least 50 candidates in order to be considered an official party. The Communist Party failed to reach that threshold and so its 32 candidates were officially considered to be independents.)	William Kashtan	31 / 264	Candidates ran as independents			
1974	William Kashtan	69 / 264	0	12,100	0.13%	▲6th
1979	William Kashtan	71 / 282	0	9,141	0.08%	▼9th
1980	William Kashtan	52 / 282	0	6,022	0.06%	9th
1984	William Kashtan	52 / 282	0	7,551	0.06%	▼10th
1988	George Hewison	51 / 295	0	7,066	0.05%	▼11th
1993 (Note: The party failed to register at least 50 candidates in time for the 1993 election. As a result, the party was deregistered and its candidates ran as independents. Party status was not regained until prior to the 2000 general election. It is unknown how many party members ran in the 1993 and 1997 elections as independents.)	Miguel Figueroa	Unknown	Candidates ran as independents			
1997	Miguel Figueroa	Unknown	Candidates ran as independents			
2000	Miguel Figueroa	52 / 301	0	8,779	0.07%	11th
2004	Miguel Figueroa	35 / 308	0	4,564	0.03%	11th
2006	Miguel Figueroa	21 / 308	0	3,022	0.02%	11th
2008	Miguel Figueroa	24 / 308	0	3,639	0.03%	▲10th
2011	Miguel Figueroa	20 / 308	0	2,894	0.02%	▼12th
2015	Miguel Figueroa	26 / 338	0	4,382	0.02%	12th
2019	Elizabeth Rowley	30 / 338	0	3,905	0.02%	12th
2021	Elizabeth Rowley	26 / 338	0	4,700	0.03%	12th
2025	Elizabeth Rowley	24 / 343	0	4,685	0.02%	12th

Notes

Percentage of the popular vote

View source data.

Average number of votes per candidate

View source data.

== See also ==
- Notable members of the Communist Party of Canada
- Organization for Jewish Colonization in Russia
- PROFUNC
- Rebel Youth
