= Youth Congress =

Youth Congress may refer to:

- Indian Youth Congress, the youth wing of the Indian National Congress
- Indonesian Youth Congress, the first was in 1928 and formalized the Indonesian language as the unifying language
- World Youth Congress Movement, (1936–1940)
  - American Youth Congress
  - Canadian Youth Congress
