= Srebrnjak =

Srebrnjak may refer to:

- Srebrnjak, Sveta Nedelja, a village in Zagreb County, Croatia
- Ivan Srebrnjak (1903–1942), Croatian communist
- Children's hospital Srebrnjak, a hospital near Lašćina, Zagreb, Croatia
- Dorina Srebrnjak, Croatian table tennis player, part of the national team at the 2017 European Table Tennis Championships – Women's team
