= Communist Party of Canada candidates in the 2019 Canadian federal election =

This is a list of Communist Party of Canada 2019 federal election candidates by riding and province.

== Alberta ==
Riding	Candidate's Name	Notes	Gender	Votes	%	Rank
Calgary Forest Lawn	Jonathan Trautman		M	134	0.3	8/9
Edmonton Griesbach	Alex Boykowich		M	322	0.7	6/9
Edmonton Stratchona	Naomi Rankin	Leader of the Communist Party of Alberta, perennial election candidate since 1982	F	124	0.2	6/7

== British Columbia ==
Riding	Candidate's Name	Notes	Gender	Votes	%	Rank
Esquimalt—Saanich—Sooke	Tyson Strandlund	Candidate in the 2015 federal election in this riding, co-founder of Olive Tree Group	M	107	0.2	7/10
Kamloops—Thompson—Cariboo	Peter Kerek		M	144	0.2	7/7
Nanaimo—Ladysmith	James Chumsa	Organizer of the Young Communist League of Canada Nanaimo club	M	104	0.1	8/9
Surrey Centre	George Gidora		M	127	0.3	8/8
Vancouver East	Peter Marcus	2015 candidate in this riding	M	177	0.3	7/8
Vancouver Kingsway	Kimball Cariou	2015, 2011, 2008, and 2006 candidate in this riding, candidate in Vancouver Centre in 2004 and 2000, Independent candidate in Vancouver East in 1997	M	288	0.7	6/7
Victoria	Robert Duncan	2019 candidate in this riding	M	161	0.2	7/8

== Manitoba ==
Riding	Candidate's Name	Notes	Gender	Votes	%	Rank
Winnipeg North	Andrew Taylor		M	118	0.4	8/8

== New Brunswick ==
Riding	Candidate's Name	Notes	Gender	Votes	%	Rank
Fredericton	Jacob Patterson		M	80	0.2	8/8

== Nova Scotia ==
Riding	Candidate's Name	Notes	Gender	Votes	%	Rank
Central Nova	Chris Frazer	Former leader of the Young Communist League of Canada and professor at St. Francis Xavier University. Candidate in Don Valley West in 1988, and in York East in the 1987 Ontario election.	M	179	0.4	6/7

== Ontario ==
Riding	Candidate's Name	Notes	Gender	Votes	%	Rank
Brampton North	Harinderpal Hundal	Candidate in this riding in 2015.	M	97	0.2	7/8
Davenport	Elizabeth Rowley	Leader of the Communist Party of Canada, 2015 candidate in Sudbury, 2011 candidate in Brampton—Springdale, 2008 candidate in Windsor West, 2006 and 2004 candidate in Scarborough Southwest and 2000 candidate in Etobicoke North	F	261	0.5	5/6
Guelph	Juanita Burnett		F	162	0.2	7/9
London North Centre	Clara Sorrenti	Organizer of the Young Communist League of Canada - London club	F	125	0.2	6/6
Nepean	Dustan Wang		M	326	0.5	5/5
Oshawa	Jeff Tomlinson		M	109	0.2	6/6
Ottawa Centre	Stuart Ryan	2015, 2011, 2006 and 2004 candidate in this riding, 2000 candidate in Ottawa West—Nepean	M	111	0.1	10/11
Ottawa South	Larry Wasslen	2015 candidate in this riding	M	94	0.1	7/8
Ottawa—Vanier	Michelle Paquette		F	115	0.2	8/10
Ottawa West—Nepean	Vincent Cama		M	99	0.2	7/9
Parkdale—High Park	Alykhan Pabani		M	120	0.2	6/8
Toronto—Danforth	Ivan Byard	2015 Ontario election candidate in Toronto Danforth, organizer of the Young Communist League of Canada - Ontario	M	151	0.3	8/8
Toronto Centre	Bronwyn Cragg	Executive member of the Canadian Network on Cuba and the Young Communist League of Canada Toronto club	M	125	0.2	8/9
University—Rosedale	Drew Garvie	2015 candidate in this riding, 2011 and 2008 candidate in Guelph, former leader of the Young Communist League of Canada	M	135	0.2	7/9

== Quebec ==
Riding	Candidate's Name	Notes	Gender	Votes	%	Rank
Hochelaga	JP Fortin		M	101	0.2	9/9
Laurier—Sainte-Marie	Adrien Welsh	2015 candidate in Outremont, General Secretary of the Young Communist League of Canada	M	64	0.1	9/10
Rosemont—La Petite-Patrie	Normand Raymond		M	85	0.1	8/9
