= Reichental =

Reichental is a Jewish surname. Notable people with the surname include:

- Avi Reichental (born 1957), Israeli-American businessperson
- František Reichentál (1895–1971), Jewish Eastern European modern artist
- Tomi Reichental (1935–2026), Slovak-born Irish Holocaust survivor and author
