= Andrija Hebrang =

Andrija Hebrang may refer to:

- Andrija Hebrang (politician, born 1899) (died 1949), Croatian politician
- Andrija Hebrang (politician, born 1946), Croatian politician and son of the above
