= UNA Europe =

European network of United Nations Associations

UNA Europe Network is a network of United Nations Associations (UNAs) based in Europe.

United Nations Associations are Non-Governmental Organisations, usually with individual and organizational members. They are peoples movements with the common goal of working for a better and stronger United Nations. Often they work with information, advocacy, international cooperation and fundraising. There are over 100 UNA's around the world and are presently organized in a world federation, World Federation of United Nations Associations (WFUNA).

There are currently 33 UNAs in the UNA Europe Network:

- Armenia
- Austria
- Belgium
- Bulgaria
- Croatia
- Cyprus
- Czech Republic
- Denmark
- Estonia
- Finland
- France
- Georgia
- Germany
- Greece
- Hungary
- Iceland
- Israel
- Italy
- Lithuania
- Luxembourg
- Montenegro
- Netherlands
- Norway
- Portugal
- Romania
- Russia
- Serbia
- Slovenia
- Spain
- Sweden
- Switzerland
- Turkey
- United Kingdom
