= Timeline of strikes in 1947 =

Strikes in 1947

In 1947, a number of labour strikes, labour disputes, and other industrial actions occurred.

== Background ==
A labour strike is a work stoppage caused by the mass refusal of employees to work. This can include wildcat strikes, which are done without union authorisation, and slowdown strikes, where workers reduce their productivity while still carrying out minimal working duties. It is usually a response to employee grievances, such as low pay or poor working conditions. Strikes can also occur to demonstrate solidarity with workers in other workplaces or pressure governments to change policies.

== Timeline ==
=== Continuing strikes from 1946 ===
- Pilbara strike

=== January ===
- 1947 Mombasa general strike, general strike in Mombasa, Kenya Colony, calling for respect and pay equality for African workers.
- 1947 Singapore municipal strike

=== February ===
- February 1 General Strike, in Japan.

=== March ===
- Biratnagar Jute Mill Strike
- 1947 Varnsdorf strike, strike by workers in Varnsdorf, Czechia, against the return of a factory to the ownership of a Jewish industrialist who had seen the factory confiscated by the Nazi occupation.

=== April ===
- Chocolate bar strike, protests by children in Canada over an increase in price of chocolate bars.
- 1947 Ruhr miners' strike, strike by miners in the Ruhr, West Germany.
- 1947 strikes in France
- 1947 Telephone strike, in the United States.

=== May ===
- 1947 Nanking student strikes, series of strikes by university students in Nanjing, Republic of China.
- 1947 Sri Lankan general strike, part of the Sri Lankan independence movement.

=== July ===
- 1947 Dadaya school strike, strike by students at the Dadaya mission school in Southern Rhodesia.
- 1947 Huelga de Brazos Caídos, es, calling for electoral reform in Costa Rica.
- 1947 Sudan rail strike, by rail workers in Anglo-Egyptian Sudan demanding that the Workers' Affairs Association be recognised as their union.

=== August ===
- 1947 Sfax General Strike
- 1947 Mount Selinda High School strike, strike by students at the Mount Selinda High School in Southern Rhodesia, against the practice of students being forced to work for the mission during school breaks.
- Mysore Chalo, satyagraha including strikes, calling for democracy in Mysore State.
- 1947 Sherritt-Gordon Mine strike, strike by miners at the Sherritt-Gordon Mine in Manitoba, Canada.
- Anti-Jewish strike by slaughterhouse workers in Liverpool as part of The Sergeants affair.

=== September ===
- 1947 Canadian meatpackers strike
- 1947 Dublin transit strike
- 1947 Łódź textile strike, strike by textile workers in Łódź, Polish People's Republic.

=== October ===
- 1947–48 French West African rail strike, by railway workers in French West Africa.
- 1947 Southern Sudan strike

=== November ===
- 1947–49 Chicago printers' strike
- 1947 Scranton dairy strike, strike by milkmen in Scranton, Pennsylvania, United States.

=== December ===
- 1947 Jerusalem riots
- 1947 Rome general strike
- 1947 Tucumán strike, strike in Tucumán Province, Argentina.

== Changes in legislation ==
- Taft–Hartley Act
