= Rebel Youth =

Bilingual magazine published in Canada

- Categories: Political
- Publisher: Young Communist League of Canada
- Founded: 1923; 103 years ago
- Country: Canada
- Language: English and French
- Website: ry-jm.ycl-ljc.ca

Rebel Youth (French: Jeunesse militante) is the bilingual magazine of the Young Communist League of Canada (YCL), published beginning in the late 1980s and relaunched in 2005. It seeks to "[offer] weekly pan-Canadian socialist perspectives on the youth and student movement across Canada and internationally."

== History ==
The earliest publication by the YCL and predecessor of Rebel Youth was The Young Worker, founded in 1923. The magazine specialized in youth issues and operated despite being declared illegal by the Government of Canada under the War Measures Act. Beginning in the late 1920s, the Young Worker also published a supplementary magazine aimed at children which achieved a circulation of over 4,000 readers. Early contributors to the magazine include journalist and Communist Party of Canada leader Leslie Morris. By 1932, the Young Worker had become a bi-weekly publication under editor Stanley Ryerson.

Due to the illegality of the magazine and of the Young Communist League of Canada, the YCL's offices were raided by the Royal Canadian Mounted Police, distributors jailed or harassed, and issues of the magazine seized. Many university libraries and archives, such as the University of Toronto's Thomas Fisher Rare Book Library, carry microfilm archives of The Young Worker compiled by the intelligence division of the Ministry of Labour.

A relaunched magazine, Advance, replaced the Young Worker in the 1930s. Advance was launched by editor John Boyd, and called for a united front strategy with other left-wing groups in response to the growth of fascism and a growing economic crisis. Advance was later relaunched as New Advance, and then in the early 1940s as Challenge, which was published until the 1950s with a mission to broaden the magazine's audience. By the early 1960s, the magazine, now called Scan, was again relaunched under a new editorial team.

Scan soon became a broadsheet publication and re-adopted the name The Young Worker by 1968. Due to the lack of popularity of the publication's new broadsheet format, the format was changed back to the original magazine format and was renamed New Horizons (later, simply Horizons) by the 1970s, the name derived from a speech by Communist Party of Canada leader Tim Buck. By 1983, the magazine adopted its current title, Rebel Youth. The name Rebel Youth is derived from Cuba's youth newspaper, Juventud Rebelde. It was adopted after the publication's previous title, New Horizons, had to be dropped due to a complaint from the Canadian federal government that was, at the time, operating a housing program with the same name.

As the YCL was liquidated in the 1990s in response to growing disagreement within the league regarding the future of the socialist movement, Rebel Youth ceased publication. It was relaunched in 2004 following the reorganization of the YCL. The magazine adopted colour printing in 2012 and aims to publish at least biannually.

Though now printed in a bilingual format, the Ligue de la Jeunesse Communiste previously maintained a separate website of the magazine's French-language articles to complement the English-language Rebel Youth website. In 2020, the Rebel Youth and Jeunesse militante websites were relaunched together in a bilingual format, and the magazine was redesigned with a new logo.
