= John Boyd (Canadian communist) =

Canadian communist activist and journalist (1913–2021)

- Born: Ivan Boychuk; January 26, 1913; Edmonton, Alberta, Canada
- Died: May 26, 2021 (aged 108); Toronto, Ontario, Canada
- Occupations: Journalist, editor, political activist
- Political party: Communist Party of Canada/Labor-Progressive Party (1935–1968)
- Spouse(s): Gladys Kucheran (m. 1933; died 1985)
- Children: 3

John Boyd (born Ivan Boychuk; January 26, 1913 – May 26, 2021) was a Canadian journalist, editor and political activist. A longtime member of the Communist Party of Canada (CPC) and its wartime legal organization, the Labor-Progressive Party, he edited several communist publications and served as executive secretary of the Canadian Slav Committee. He was also elected as a trustee of the Toronto Board of Education.

Boyd was born in Edmonton to Ukrainian immigrant parents and became involved with the Ukrainian Labour-Farmer Temple Association and Young Communist League of Canada as a teenager. He moved to Toronto in 1934 and joined the Communist Party in 1935. He subsequently worked for communist publications including the Daily Clarion, The Young Worker and Canadian Tribune.

Boyd married Gladys Kucheran in 1933, several months after meeting her in Lethbridge, Alberta. They had theee children and were married for 52 years, until her death in 1985 at the age of 72.

During World War II, Boyd served in the Canadian Army with the Royal Canadian Corps of Signals, where he edited the military publication The Signalman. He was also elected twice to the Toronto Board of Education during the 1940s. In the 1948 school board election in Ward 5, Boyd and fellow Labor-Progressive Party candidate Edna Ryerson faced an explicitly anti-Communist campaign by candidate Harold Menzies, who distributed campaign material urging voters to "Keep Communism Out of Our Schools".

After the war, Boyd resumed his political and journalistic activities. In 1948, he became director of the Canadian Slav Committee, through which he helped organize cultural activities involving Slavic Canadian organizations. His political work also took him abroad, including visits to China and the Soviet Union.

In 1967, Boyd moved to Prague, Czechoslovakia, as the CPC's representative on the editorial board of the international communist journal World Marxist Review. His experiences during the Prague Spring and the subsequent Warsaw Pact invasion of Czechoslovakia in 1968 led him to leave the Communist Party.

After leaving the CPC, Boyd worked as editor of Hospital Administration in Canada and later as public relations director for Extendicare. He also became an accomplished painter and exhibited his work in several art shows.

In 1999, Boyd published A Noble Cause Betrayed ... But Hope Lives On: Pages from a Political Life, a memoir of his experiences in the Canadian communist movement. He spent his final years at the Sunnybrook Veterans Centre in Toronto and died on May 26, 2021, aged 108.
