= Vladimir Popović (politician) =

Yugoslav politician (1914–1972)

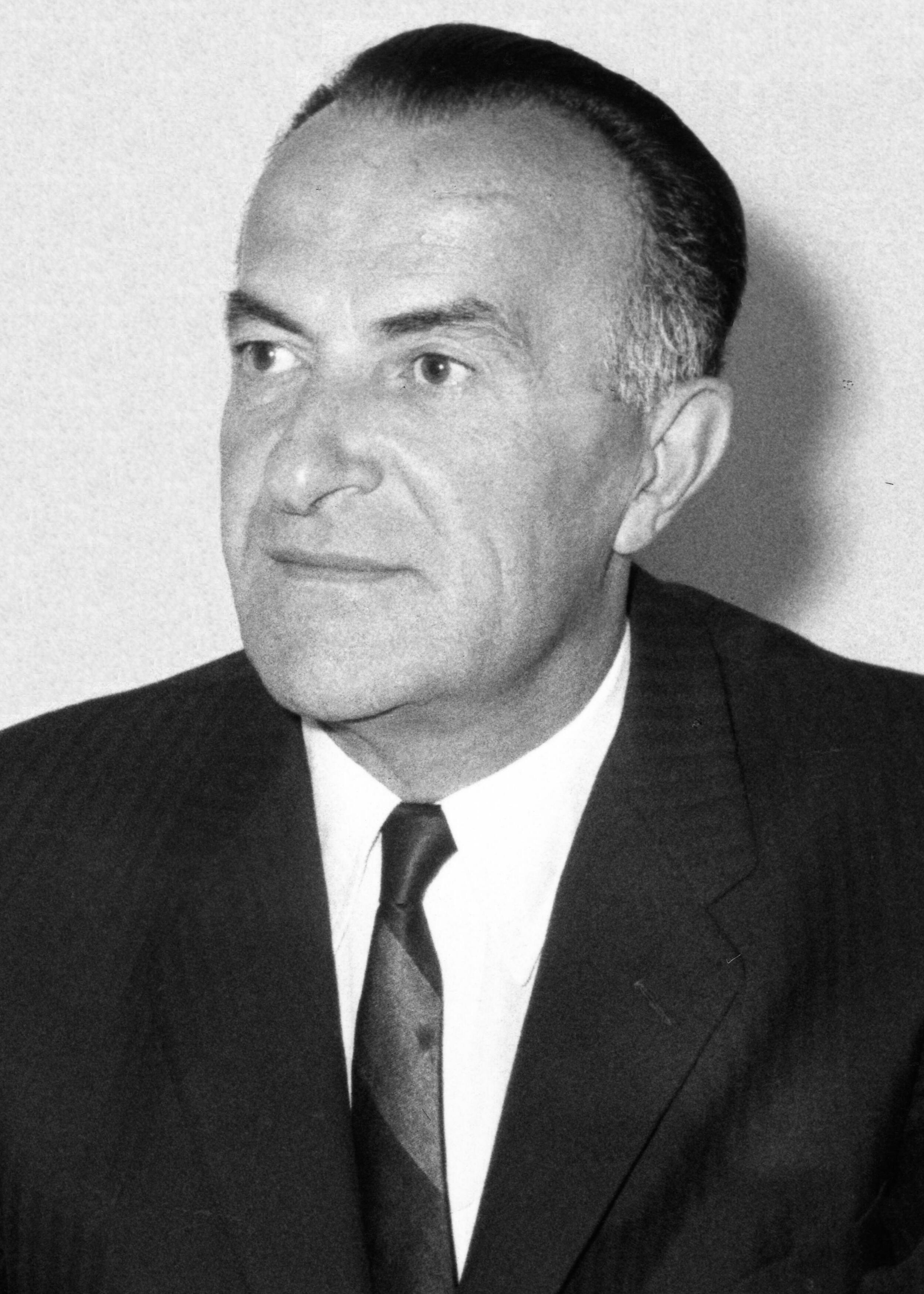

Personal details
- Born: Vladimir Popović; 27 January 1914 Gornji Brčeli, Montenegro
- Died: 1 April 1972 (aged 58) London, England
- Education: University of Belgrade School of Medicine
- Occupation: Diplomat

Military service
- Rank: Captain, Spanish Republican Army; Major General, Yugoslav People's Liberation Army
- Awards: Commemorative Medal of the Partisans of 1941; Order of People's Hero

Vladimir Popović Lukin (27 January 1914 – 1 April 1972) was a Yugoslav diplomat, communist politician and army general. He was a close associate of Josip Broz Tito. He was, during his career, a delegate to the UN, close associate of Josip Broz Tito, Yugoslavia's envoy (ambassador) to the USSR, US, China, and Vietnam, member of the federal government of Yugoslavia, and chair of the Committee for Foreign Affairs of the Federal Assembly of Yugoslavia, and secretary to the presidency until his death in 1972.

== Biography ==
Popović was born in 1914 in Gornji Brčeli, near Bar, Kingdom of Montenegro. In 1932, he joined the Yugoslav Communist Party. From 1934 to 1937, he attended the NKVD School in Leningrad under the nickname of "Španac" (Spaniard) where he learned English, German, and Spanish language and diplomat protocols. In 1937 he graduated from the University of Belgrade's School of Medicine.

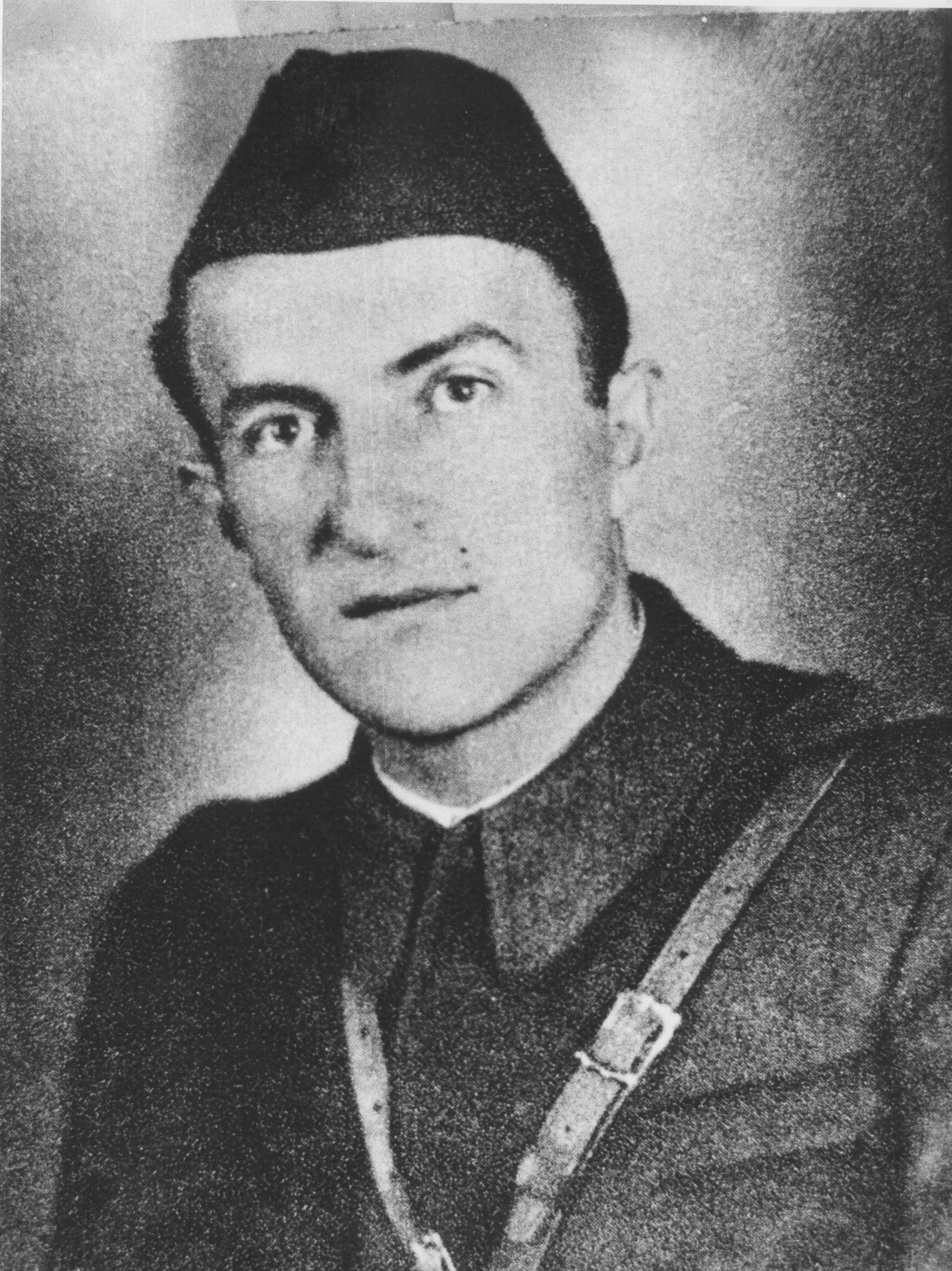
Vladimir Popovic

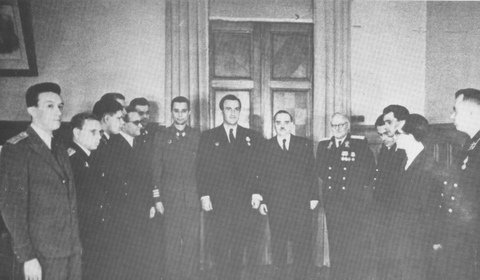
Vladimir Popovic and Molotov in Moscow

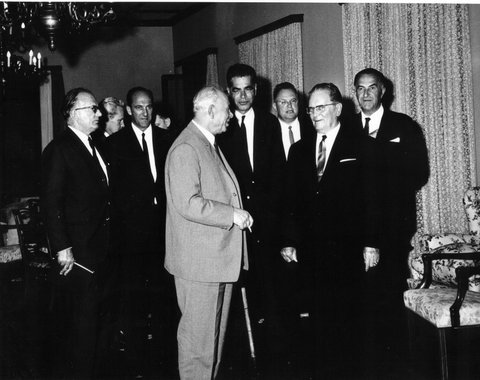
Vladimir Popovic and Josip Broz Tito

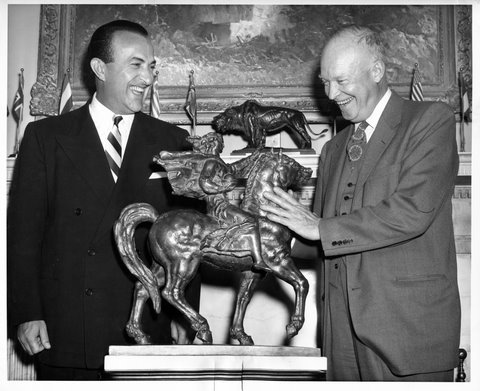
3 November 1956 Washington DC Vladimir Popovic Yugoslav Ambassador to USA presents Dwight Eisenhower, President of the USA, a statuette in bronze by Antun Augustincic Monument of Peace standing in front of the United Nations building in New YorkNY USA

That same year, he represented his fellow students at the World Youth Congress in Paris where he met Josip Broz Tito, then Secretary of the Yugoslav Communist Party. He then joined the Spanish Civil War, reaching the rank of Captain in the Spanish Republican Army. After the Invasion of Yugoslavia in 1941 by the Axis powers, he became a leader of the Yugoslav Partisans forces in Croatia. In 1944, he advanced to the rank of major general, commanding the Partisan Third Army Corps in Bosnia.

After the end of the war, Tito sent him to Bulgaria as the Yugoslav military and political representative. In 1945, he was named Yugoslavia's first Communist Ambassador to the Soviet Union. In 1946, he was a member of the Yugoslav delegation to the United Nations and part of the Yugoslav Delegation at the Paris Peace conference in Versailles (21 delegations from countries in the Second World War with Germany).

From 1946 to 1947 he was in Moscow, where he helped negotiate economic-cooperation agreements with the Soviet Union. In 1948, the Cominform (an organization 1947–56 established by the Communist parties of nine European countries for mutual advice and coordinated activity) denounced the Yugoslav Communist Party and the Soviet Union imposed an economic blockade on Yugoslavia. He would then become First Deputy Minister of Foreign Affairs and was elected to the Central Committee of the Yugoslav Communist party.

In 1949 he served as chief of the Yugoslav Delegation to the United Nations General Assembly where he sought the aid of Western powers for his country. In 1950, he was named as Ambassador to the United States and pledged a policy of peaceful cooperation. He was influential in obtaining $38 million in food and supplies for his drought–stricken country. He helped obtain $50 million in economic aid from the United States, Britain and France, which was secured after the release of archbishop Aloysius Stepinac. In 1954 he was Chairman of the foreign affairs committee of the Federal People's Assembly of Yugoslavia. From 1955 to 1958, he served as ambassador to China, USA and Vietnam. From 1958 to 1972, he held several different positions. He was a member of the presidium of the Central Committee in charge of Foreign Policy, a member of the Federal Government, the Chairman of the Committee for foreign economic relations, head of goodwill trade missions to Latin America, on missions to members of The Non-Aligned Movement NAM and Secretary to the Presidency until his death 1972 in London.

He married Vjera Radimir in 1946.
