= Canadian Youth Congress =

Canadian left-wing youth movement (1935–1942)

The Canadian Youth Congress was a left-wing youth movement that existed from 1935 until 1942, when it was declared illegal under the Defence of Canada Regulations. It was founded in Toronto in May 1935 as an organization to mobilize youths and youth-oriented organizations across Canada to lobby the government for change in the face of mass unemployment during the Great Depression in Canada. At its height, it had a constituent membership of over 400,000 and offices across the country and held annual congresses that attracted several hundred delegates.

The organization was part of the World Youth Congress Movement and sent delegates to the First World Youth Congress held in Geneva in 1936 and the Second World Youth Congress held at Vassar College in Poughkeepsie, New York in 1938.

At the 1936 Canadian Youth Congress national meeting in Ottawa, the group reported that it represented “men and women: youth from all the different religious denominations; from schools and universities; from the Y.M. and W.C.A.’s; from all political groupings; from different racial groups; from farms, factories, the professions; peace, cultural, athletic societies—English-speaking and French-speaking Canadians. The congress expressed the thought of awakened and intelligent youth opinion throughout our country”.

In 1936, the CYC's Ottawa congress issued the Declaration of the Rights of Youth calling for youth employment training, public health care, social security, recreational and educational facilities, and world peace. Later in 1936, the CYC issued the Youth’s Peace Policy which stated that “war is not inevitable” and that “lasting peace can only be organized on a basis of justice” and calling on nations to adhere to the Covenant of the League of Nations. It called for Canada to make its own independent decisions in regards to war rather than automatically following the lead of the United Kingdom in foreign policy.

At its height, it was able to attract speakers at its conferences ranging from Tommy Douglas of the Co-operative Commonwealth Federation to Paul Martin, Sr. of the Liberal Party of Canada and Denton Massey of the Conservatives, to Tim Buck of the Communist Party of Canada.

In 1940, after World War II had broken out, the CYC's annual congress, held in Montreal, issued a declaration in support of civil liberties, stating that “the War Measures Act and the Defence of Canada Regulations deny our traditional rights of free speech, free assembly, organization and trade union action, free press, radio and pulpit" and also opposing conscription in Canada, in a statement title Youth Want Jobs Not Conscription.

The organization was surveilled by the Royal Canadian Mounted Police as a suspected subversive organization, due to the involvement of the Young Communist League of Canada, which was a constituent organization of the CYC that would be been banned under the Defence of Canada Regulations in 1940. The RCMP claimed that of the 730 participants at the 1936 congress, 50 were members of the Young Communist League and a further 150 were "straight Communists" and claimed that 85% of participants at the 1940 congress were Communists. The CYC's anti-war statements at its 1940 congress resulted in several organizations that supported the war effort withdrawing their affiliation with the CYC. In 1942, the CYC dissolved after it was itself banned under the Defence of Canada Regulations.

== See also ==
- American Youth Congress
