= International Federation of League of Nations Societies =

Flag of WFUNA, the successor of the IFLSN

The International Federation of League of Nations Societies (IFLNS) (French: Union internationale des associations pour la Société des Nations - UIASDN) gathered national associations promoting the ideals of the League of Nations. At its height, it claimed member-Associations in forty countries. It was founded in Geneva, Switzerland in 1919, and ceased operations in 1939.

It is considered to be the forerunner of the World Federation of United Nations Associations, founded in 1946.

== Activity ==
By the initiative of the leadership in 1933 the federation founded an international youth organization, which resulted in the First World Youth Congress in Geneva from 31 August to 6 September 1936.
