= World Federation of United Nations Associations =

Charitable organization

- WFUNA logo

- Flag of WFUNA

- Offices of the WFUNA Secretariat Offices of the WFUNA Secretariat in Europe Offices of the WFUNA Secretariat in north America
- Abbreviation: WFUNA, FMANU
- Named after: United Nations Organisation
- Predecessor: International Federation of League of Nations Societies
- Formation: 2 August 1946; 80 years ago
- Founded at: Luxembourg City, Luxembourg
- Purpose: Promote and defend the values of the UN
- Headquarters: Geneva, Switzerland; New York, United States
- Region served: World
- Official language: English, French
- President: (Hungary) Katalin Bogyay
- Secretary-General: (Greece) Aziel Philippos Goulandris
- Key people: Jan Masaryk, Eleanor Roosevelt (founding members); Hans Blix (former president); Arthur Ross (donnor)
- Main organ: Plenary Assembly, Executive Committee
- Awards: Wateler Peace Prize (1965), Jan Masaryk Medal
- Website: wfuna.org
- Remarks: "WFUNA connects the United Nations to the people—and now, more than ever before, engaged global citizens shape history." Ban Ki Moon, Secretary-General, United Nations, April 2016

The World Federation of United Nations Associations (WFUNA) (French: Fédération Mondiale des Associations pour les Nations Unies, FMANU) was founded in 1946 as a Federation of national associations. Its objectives are to promote the values of the UN Charter, defend multilateralism, work towards a better United Nations Organisation and raise awareness on the main pillars of work of the United Nations—peace and security, sustainable development, and human rights.

WFUNA is an international non-governmental organization with Consultative Status at the United Nations Economic and Social Council (ECOSOC) and consultative or liaison links with many other UN organizations and agencies. As a Federation, its membership is made of 95 United Nations Associations (UNAs) in as many member states of the UN.

WFUNA is the largest non-profit organization with the mission of supporting the principles and purposes of the UN.

== History ==
The basis for the existence of a people's movement in favor of a global intergovernmental organisation was set by the International Federation of League of Nations Societies (French: Union internationale des associations pour la Société des Nations) which ceased operations in 1939.

WFUNA was founded in Luxembourg on 2 August 1946 by 22 national United Nations Associations (UNAs). The Constitution they adopted proclaims:

"We the representatives of the United Nations Associations in our respective countries,

Believing that since wars begin in the minds of men, it is in the minds of men that the defenses of peace must be constructed, and Believing that the peace must be founded, if it is not to fail, upon the intellectual and moral solidarity of all peoples,

Have resolved to combine our efforts to form an association of the peoples to be known as the World Federation of United Nations Associations."

Eleanor Roosevelt was an active participant in WFUNA and one of the leading figures in its creation.

Over the years, UNAs have been established in more UN member states, especially as new countries were formed and joined the UN.

In practical terms, WFUNA played a crucial role by helping people in those countries where human rights were violated, such as Franco's Spain, some of the former communist countries in Eastern Europe and in the Middle East. WFUNA brought together people of divided countries – such as East and West Germany and Cyprus, and the opponents in conflicts, for example between Israel and Egypt in the late 1960s.

WFUNA helped promote "Security and Co-operation in Europe" (CSCE) by holding in 1967 the first conference on this topic. Other NGOs followed WFUNA's campaign which continued until 1975 when the Final Act was signed at Helsinki by 35 governments, including United States and Canada, establishing the CSCE process. Further campaigning led in 1994 to the CSCE process that consisted of a Biennial Review Conference being raised to a Permanent Organization (OSCE).

WFUNA, including its African UNA members, made significant contributions to the NGO campaign for the abolition of Apartheid. The 32nd General Assembly of the UN, in 1977, received a resolution from the 117th WFUNA Executive Committee meeting, which requested:

"The Security Council of the UN to give urgent consideration to the taking of immediate steps to ensure that no State, multinational or other body or person be allowed to provide South Africa or Rhodesia with any equipment, technology or production of nuclear weapons of any kind".

WFUNA facilitated high-level informal consultations on disarmament issues between key experts of the US and USSR during the Cold War. It organized a number of NGO Seminars on disarmament in cooperation with the UN, UNESCO and other NGOs.

During its history, WFUNA has served as a forum for global dialogues on development. Several suggestions, like the establishment of an Economic Commission for Africa, were first adopted at the WFUNA Plenary Assemblies and then endorsed by governments.

WFUNA has actively supported reform of the UN and its capacity to meet new tasks and challenges. WFUNA has continually received recognition from the highest ranks of the UN. The sentiments in this statement by UN Secretary-General, Dag Hammarskjöld, to WFUNA's 12th Plenary Assembly were shared by his successors: "I wish... to express my appreciation of your most essential service. At the same time, I wish to urge you to fresh endeavors. Over the years you have accomplished much and have acted with an ever increasing sense of your great responsibilities."

For many years WFUNA conducted a fund raising program based on the sale of first day covers of UN stamps and lithographs produced by artists and celebrities, such as Picasso, Lou Zheng Jang, Miró, Salvador Dalí, Ruben Leyva, Al Hirschfeld and Andy Warhol to promote the ideals of the UN. This highly successful program ran for several decades during the 20th century.

The UN General Assembly has adopted several resolutions expressing appreciation for WFUNA's efforts to support the values of the UN. In 1986 resolution 41/68 recognizes WFUNA as "the only non-profit that is entirely dedicated to mobilize popular support for the goals and principles of the United Nations" and asks for "all governments to help WFUNA" in its actions. In 2013, resolution 64/86 commends the World Federation of United Nations Associations and its United Nations associations for the valuable contributions they have made, and calls for continued collaboration between the World Federation and the Department of Public Information in support of their complementary objectives". In 2015, resolution 70/93 recalls resolution 41/68.

== Leadership ==
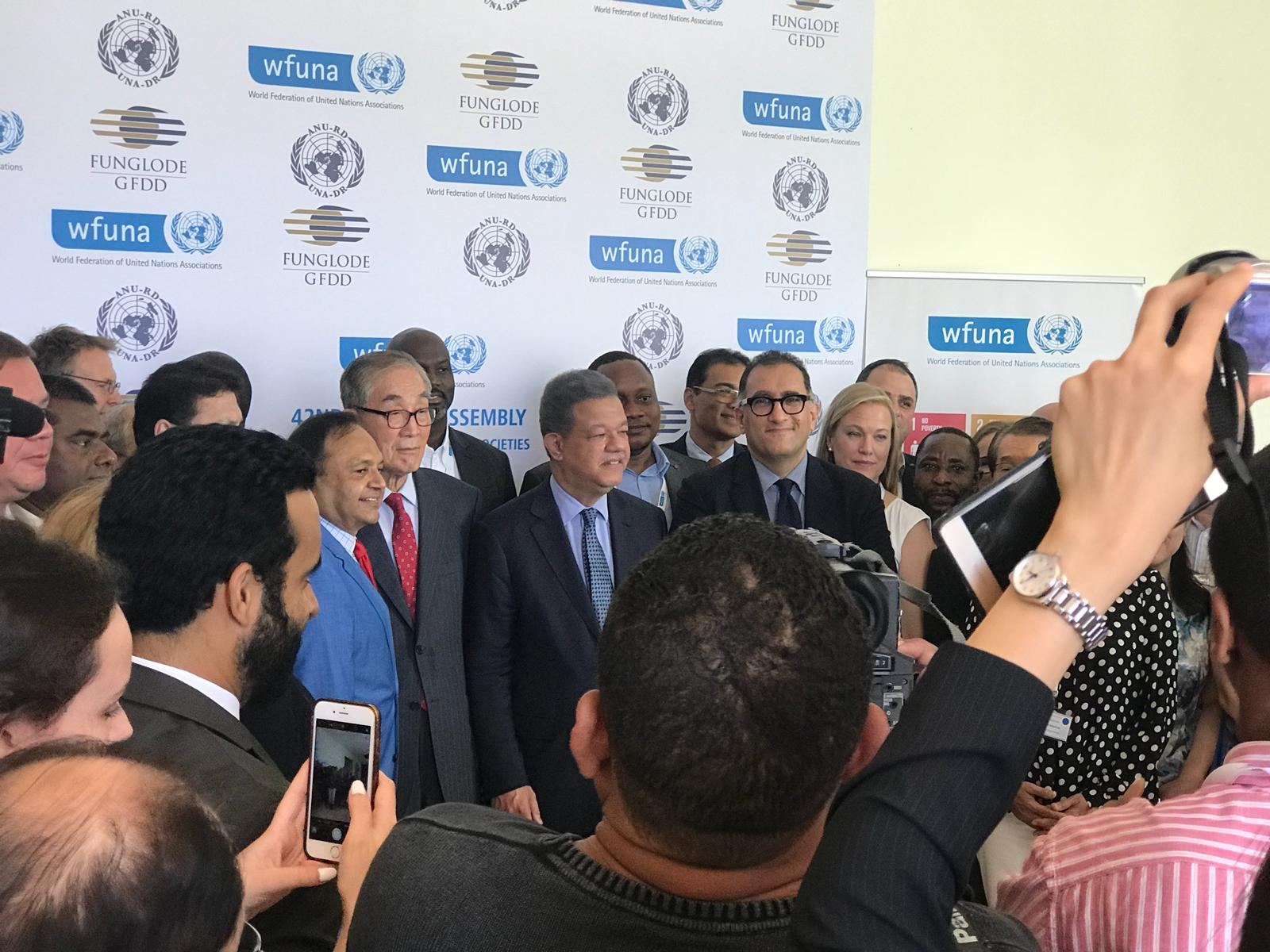
Leonel Fernandez and WFUNA's Leadership on the day of his election, 20 October 2018

Nr	President	Country	Term
1	Jan Masaryk	Czechoslovakia	2 August 1946 – 10 March 1948
–	K. B. Courtney	United Kingdom	1948
–	J. Simonsen	Denmark	1949 – 1951
2	Nasrollah Entezam	Iran	1951 – 1953
3	Vijaya Lakshmi Pandit	India	1954
4	La-lad Pibulsonggram	Thailand	1955 – 1956
5	Roberto Ago	Italy	1957 – 1959
6	Paul Guggenheim	Switzerland	1960 – 1963
7	Adriaan Pelt	Netherlands	1963 – 1966
8	Aleš Bebler	Yugoslavia	1966 – 1969
9	Justice Michael Triantafylides	Cyprus	1969 – 1973
10	U Thant	Burma	1973 – 1974
11	René Maheu	France	1975 – 1976
12	Mihály Simai	Hungary	1976 – 1981
13	Sidney Willer	United States	1981 – 1983
14	Davidson Nicol	Sierra Leone	1983 – 1987
15	Maurice Strong	Canada	1987 – 1991
16	Androulla Vassiliou	Greece	1991 – 1995
17	Hashim Abdul Halim	India	1995 – 2003
18	Rhyl Jansen	New Zealand	2003 – 2006
19	Hans Blix	Sweden	2006 – 11 August 2009
20	Park Soo-gil	South Korea	11 August 2009 – 20 November 2018
21	Leonel Fernández	Dominican Republic	20 November 2018 – 11 November 2022
22	Shawn Chen	United States	11 November 2022 – 27 August 2026
23	Katalin Bogyay	Hungary	27 August 2026 - present

== Membership and network ==
There are currently 92 UN Associations connecting hundreds of thousands of people to the United Nations. UNAs at the national level mainly play a role in:

Map of the current United Nations Associations
- Each dot represents one national UNA Map of the current United Nations Associations in Europe Map of the current United Nations Associations in North America Map of the current United Nations Associations in South America Map of the current United Nations Associations in Asia Map of the current United Nations Associations in Oceania

- Disseminating information and educational materials about the importance of multilateralism and the UN
- Lobbying the government, political parties and interest groups
- Conducting Model UN conferences
- Stimulating the media to provide frequent and accurate coverage of the UN and its programs
- Facilitating the engagement of citizens of UN member-States in favour of the common values of the UN Charter
- Promoting Global Citizenship

A United Nations Association can only be recognized in a UN member-State and there can be only one in each UN member-State. All Associations are non-profit organizations, independent from one another. WFUNA is in charge of the coordination of the network and puts efforts in building the capacity of its existing members while trying to provide counseling to those groups willing to create new UNAs in member-State that don't have any.

The continent with the most UN associations is Europe immediately followed by Africa while South America has seen a rapid growth in numbers of UNAs in the last decade.

== Areas of work ==
WFUNA is involved with the UN system since its inception and has been working with most Member States through its activities and through its member Associations.

- Transparency at the UN: as part of WFUNA's mandate to strengthen and improve the UN, the organization implements initiatives that increase the transparency of established UN processes.
- Civil Society Working Towards the Sustainable Development Goals: as part of a belief that people's involvement in local, national, and global decision-making is essential to achieving the UN's goals, WFUNA ensures that civil society is involved in UN programs and events.
- Global Citizenship Around the World: as global citizenship is at the heart of WFUNA's mission, the organization facilitates regular programs that foster critical-thinking and problem-solving, and empowers people to act in their communities.
- Human Rights: since the adoption in 1948 of the Universal Declaration of Human Rights, WFUNA considered human rights advocacy as a central part of its programs. A number of international seminars in different regions of the world have been organized by WFUNA on the teaching of human rights. The proposal for creating the position of a High Commissioner for Human Rights was on WFUNA's agenda for many years.

== Art and philately ==
Many renowned artists have dedicated works or art to WFUNA and to the values of the organisation.

WFUNA's lithograph program started in 1966 for the 30th anniversary of the Federation and included a set of works from renowned artists like Salvador Dalí or Friedrich Hundertwasser. Many of these works were later reproduced to be part of the WFUNA philatelic program with the stamps being included by the United Nations among their offer for general circulation. More lithographs were added in 1976 like that of Victor Vasarely, French representative of the Op Art school. In the 1980s surrealist Juan Miro signed for WFUNA one of his last lithographs. The program marked a pause and resumed after the 42nd Plenary Assembly of the organisation. In 2020 French artist Greg Mathias of the neo cubist school, signed WFUNA's first linocut, "Bridges".

In 2020, WFUNA also resumed with the traditional creation of art posters to commemorate specific events starting with the 75th Anniversary of the United Nations and with idea of "fragile multilateralism" as a leading message.

=== Artists having signed works for WFUNA's Lithograph Program ===
- Victor Vasarely (France)
- Chaim Gross (USA
- Joan Miró (Spain)
- Salvador Dalí (Spain)
- Friedrich Hundertwasser (Germany)
- Greg Mathias (France)
- Norman Rockwell (USA)
- František Reichentál (Austria-Hungary/Czechoslovakia)
- Andy Warhol (USA)
- Richard Bernstein (artist) (USA)

== See also ==
- Otto Hahn Peace Medal
- PassBlue
