= Andrija Hebrang (politician, born 1899) =

Croatian and Yugoslav communist revolutionary and politician

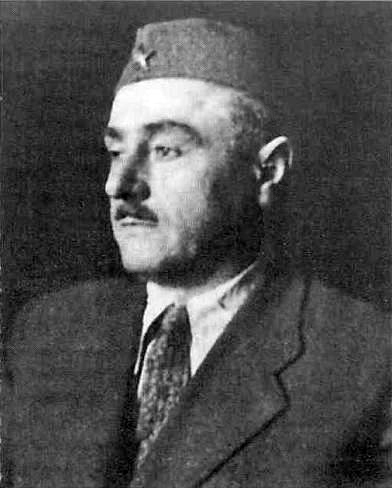
- Andrija Hebrang (wearing a Partisan cap)

4th Secretary of the Communist Party of Croatia
- In office 1942 – October 1944
- Preceded by: Vlado Popović
- Succeeded by: Vladimir Bakarić

Minister of Industry
- In office March 7, 1945 – June 13, 1946
- Preceded by: Juraj Šutej
- Succeeded by: Boris Kidrič

President of the Economic Council
- In office March 7, 1945 – 1947
- Preceded by: position established

President of the Planning Commission
- In office June 13, 1946 – January 8, 1948
- Preceded by: position established

Commissioner for Trade and Industry
- In office October 31, 1944 – March 7, 1945
- Preceded by: position established
- Succeeded by: position dissolved

Personal details
- Born: 22 October 1899 Bačevac, Croatia-Slavonia, Austria-Hungary
- Died: 11 June 1949 (aged 49) Belgrade, PR Serbia, FPR Yugoslavia
- Party: Communist Party of Yugoslavia (KPJ)
- Spouse: Olga Hebrang (née Strauss)
- Children: Andrija Hebrang; Branko Hebrang; Dunja Hebrang
- Occupation: Politician, revolutionary
- Awards: Order of National Liberation; Order of People's Merit; Medal of the Partisans - 1941; Order of Kutuzov (I); Order of Brotherhood and Unity (I)

Military service
- Allegiance: Yugoslavia (1941–1948)
- Branch/service: Yugoslav Partisans

Andrija Hebrang (22 October 1899 – 11 June 1949) was a Croatian and Yugoslav communist revolutionary and politician. A member of the Communist Party of Yugoslavia until his dismissal, he served as the 4th Secretary of the Central Committee of the Communist Party of Croatia.

== Early life ==
Andrija Hebrang was born in the village of Bačevac near Gradina to Andrija Hebrang Sr. and Cela Strasser, a mixed Croatian-Jewish mercantile family. In World War I, he was stationed in Osijek, Zagreb, and finally the battlefields in Gorizia, Italy where he stayed until the end of the war. Not long afterward, in 1919, he joined the Communist Party of Yugoslavia and became heavily involved in socialist political causes.

== Political involvement ==
He became a member of the Socialist Workers' Party of Yugoslavia (communists) in 1919 in Osijek, distinguished himself and was a member of the Local Committee of the CPY for Zagreb. In December 1920, the government of the Kingdom of Serbs, Croats and Slovenes issued the Obznana, which prohibited the legal activities of the Communist Party of Yugoslavia. The Communist Party was formally outlawed under the Law on the Protection of the State in August 1921. At the beginning of 1923, the communists illegally founded the Independent Workers' Party of Yugoslavia. In the same year, Hebrang settled in Zagreb. In the 1925 elections, the Independent Workers' Party won only 1.1% of the vote and was left without a seat in the National Assembly. The following year, Hebrang joined the Board of Directors of a branch of the Union of Private Employees as treasurer, and before their congress in October 1927 he was expelled from the union and administration.

In 1928, the city of Pantovčak was presided over by VIII. conference of the Zagreb Communists where, together with Tito, he opposed factional struggles within the Party. The victory of their anti-factional current, with the support of Antun Mavrak, secretary of the CPY Provincial Committee for Croatia and Slavonia, enabled the consolidation of party ranks. At the invitation of the Comintern, Hebrang travelled as a delegate of the Zagreb organisation to a consultation of Yugoslav communist representatives in Vienna. He was arrested while illegally crossing the Austrian border and sentenced to three months' imprisonment; following an appeal, the sentence was reduced, and he was released in May 1928. He was subsequently expelled to his birthplace, Bačevac, for five years. He returned illegally to Zagreb, where, after the murder of Pavle Radić and Đuro Basaričko, the wounding of Ivan Pernar and Ivan Granđa, and the fatal wounding of Stjepan Radić in the National Assembly on June 20, 1928, the work of the Party intensified. Following the assassinations, the ensuing protests intensified police persecution of opponents of the regime, especially HSS members and communists.

=== Imprisonment (1928–1941) ===
Hebrang was arrested again on September 7, 1928, together with Mihail Vraneš, in Zagreb, in front of the house in Gundulićeva Street, where the secret Party archives were located. Because he was arrested with compromising letters and documents, he was taken to remand prison. At that time, communism, under the State Protection Act, was characterized as a coup d'état, which made it impossible to punish Hebrang more leniently. At the trial in Belgrade, he did not admit his affiliation with the Communist Party, but declared himself a communist by conviction. As his communist activity was indisputably proven, the State Court for the Protection of the State sentenced him in November 1929 to 12 years in prison. He was sent to serve his sentence in Lepoglava, and from 1935, together with other political prisoners, communists, he was transferred to Srijemska Mitrovica.

In March 1941, shortly after his release from prison, he became a member of the Central Committee of the Communist Party of Croatia.

== World War II ==
In 1942, he was captured by the Ustaše in house of Ivan Srebrenjak and sent to Stara Gradiška concentration camp, where he was later exchanged along with his future wife, Olga, for several Ustasha officials. He traveled to Bihać to attend the Anti-fascist Council of the National Liberation of Yugoslavia (AVNOJ). He also helped form the State Antifascist Council of the National Liberation of Croatia (ZAVNOH) and served as the vice-president. On 20 September 1943, ZAVNOH unilaterally issued a declaration that Istria, Rijeka, and Italian-occupied Dalmatia were part of Croatia without the prior approval of the national AVNOJ. which angered Yugoslav leader Tito.

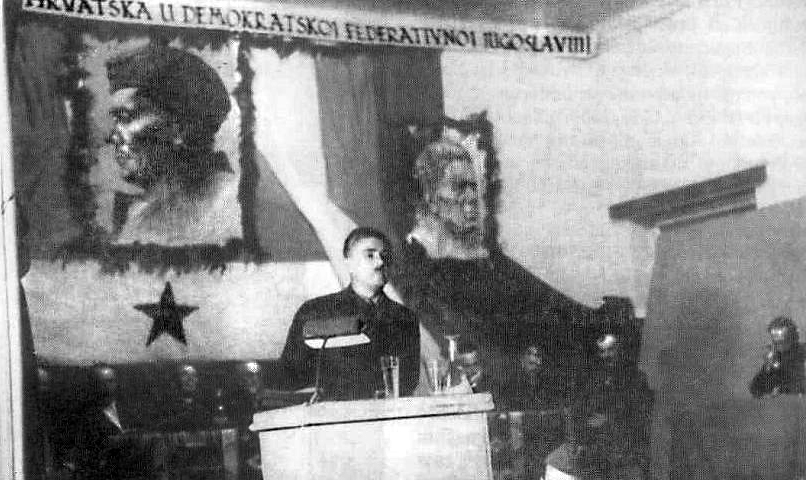
Andrija Hebrang holding a speech during the third session of ZAVNOH on 8 May 1944

At the third session of ZAVNOH, held on 8–9 May in Topusko several resolutions were adopted which further angered Broz. They included an openness to continue religious education in schools and overtures to a free press. In September 1944, the executive board of ZAVNOH established the Telegraphic Agency of Croatia (TAH). Broz immediately sent a telegram to Hebrang on 17 September:

Immediately stop with the work of this so-called telegraph agency - TAH. What does this even mean? You're sliding with full force into separatism. Don't you realize that even federal states have a single telegraph agency. Let your example be the Soviet Union if no other.

The following day Broz also sent a telegram to Edvard Kardelj:

Urgently travel to Croatia. They're creating some unbelievable idiocy. First, ZAVNOH adopted a resolution according to which religious education is a mandatory subject in schools. Second, they've founded some telegraph agency - TAH. This all demonstrates that separatist tendencies are fairly strong and this is true of our comrades. With this there is no kidding, for we will have to undertake the sharpest measures. For all this I blame Andrija. Make inquiries and if Andrija is not of this opinion, we will have to immediately remove him from the post of secretary of the CC [Central Committee].

== After World War II ==
=== Industrialization ===
==== Five-Year Plan ====
Industrialization was the most significant process in the economic development of the SR Croatia, as communists promoted industrialization as the main factor in fast development. After the process of renewal, the process of industrialization and electrification started based on the Soviet model. The whole economy, the creation of a system and the formulation of the strategy of development in the Five-Year Plan, was in the hands of Andrija Hebrang. As President of the Economy Council and President of the Planning Commission, Hebrang was in charge of all ministries that dealt with the economy. Alongside Tito, Edvard Kardelj and Aleksandar Ranković, he was the most influential person in Yugoslavia. As a chief of the whole economy, Hebrang finished his Five-Year Plan in winter 1946–47 which was approved by the government in spring 1947. Because of the lack of knowledge, the Plan copied the Soviet model. The factories which were built faster were factories that were in the sector of heavy and military industry, of which the most known in SR Croatia were "Rade Končar" and "Prvomajska".

In the Five-Year Plan, Hebrang wanted to increase the industrial production by five times and agricultural production by 1.5 times, increase the GDP per capita by 1.8 times and the national revenues by 1.8 times. The plan also included the increase of qualified workers, from 350,000 to 750,000. For the SR Croatia, it was decided that its industrial production needed to be increased by 452%. The fast development in industry required a high number of workers, so from 461,000 workers in 1945, in 1949 there were 1,990,000 workers. On 17 January 1947, Kardelj stated to the Central Committee of the Communist Party of Croatia that Yugoslavia would be industrially stronger than Austria and Czechoslovakia. Both Kardelj and Bakarić advocated development of light industry, instead of Hebrang's idea for industry that would serve agriculture.

== Later years and death ==
Around the beginning of the Tito–Stalin Split in 1948, Hebrang was suspected of being Stalin's prime candidate for replacing Tito. Hebrang was thus blacklisted from the Yugoslav Communist Party and expelled. By March his phones were tapped, and in April he was placed under house arrest, relieved of all official duties. In May, he was accused of collaborating with the Ustashe and the Gestapo to sabotage Yugoslavia and spy for the Soviets after Tito broke with Joseph Stalin.

Hebrang was arrested in Belgrade by UDBA agents and accused of numerous treasons, while his wife and small children were put under house arrest. He disappeared under suspicious circumstances. UDBA official Milorad Milatović, who was in charge of the Hebrang case, claimed in 1952 that Hebrang had committed suicide at Glavnjača prison in Belgrade on 11 June 1949, but his body was never recovered and no official death certificate was filed. In the late 1980s, several historians reported that Hebrang had been assassinated in his Belgrade prison cell for political reasons.

== Afterwards ==
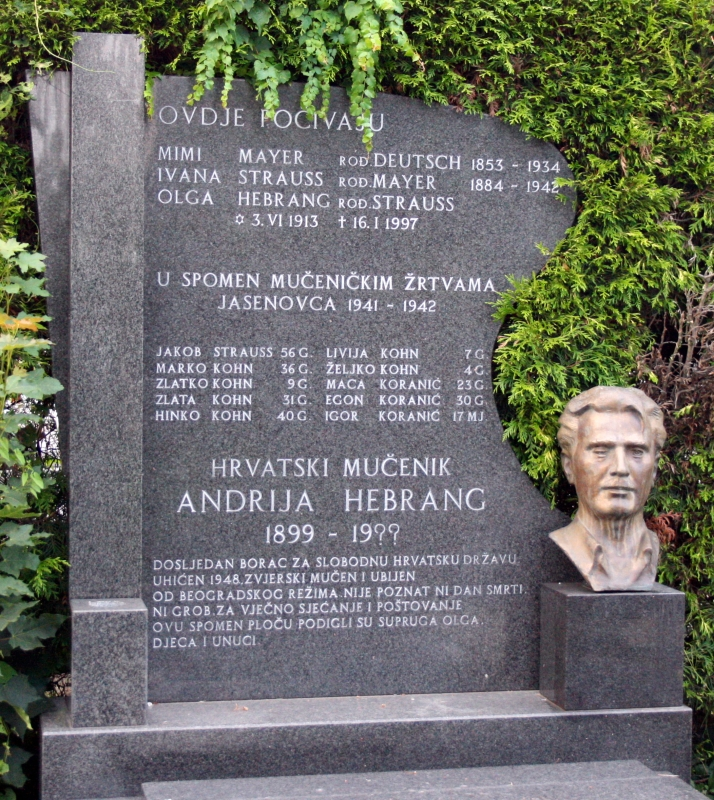
Hebrang family tomb at the Mirogoj Cemetery

Not long after Hebrang's arrest, his wife Olga was sentenced to twelve years in prison, and his children were sent to live with his sister, Ilona, in Zagreb. His family changed their surname as the government blacklisted anyone with the surname Hebrang. In 1992, the government of the Republic of Croatia rehabilitated Hebrang as a "victim of communism". His sons Andrija and Branko were active in the efforts to rehabilitate their father and return his remains.

== Legacy ==
A street in central Zagreb, Ulica Andrije Hebranga, is named for Hebrang.

== Sources ==
- Tanner, Marcus (1997). Croatia: A Nation Forged in War. Yale University Press. ISBN 0-300-07668-1.

Party political offices
Preceded by Vlado Popović	Secretary of the Central Committee of the Communist Party of Croatia; 1942 – October 1944	Succeeded by Vladimir Bakarić
