= Young Communist League of Canada =

Marxist–Leninist youth organization

Young Communist League of Canada Ligue de la jeunesse communiste du Canada
- Secretary General: Ivan Byard
- Founded: July 22, 1922
- Headquarters: 290A Danforth Avenue; Toronto, Ontario; M4K 1N6
- Ideology: Communism; Marxism–Leninism
- International affiliation: WFDY (since 2008); YCI (1922–1943)
- Other affiliation: Communist Party of Canada; Canadian Peace Congress; Canadian Network on Cuba
- Magazine: Rebel Youth
- Website: www.ycl-ljc.ca

The Young Communist League of Canada (YCL-LJC) is a Canadian Marxist–Leninist youth organization founded in 1922. The organization is ideologically aligned with, but organizationally independent from, the Communist Party of Canada. The organization's members played a leading role in the On-to-Ottawa Trek and made up a significant portion of the Mackenzie–Papineau Battalion, which fought on the Republican side in the Spanish Civil War.

== History ==
=== 1920s ===
The Young Communist League of Canada first organized on July 22, 1922, under the direction of the Communist Party of Canada. It was formally established as the youth wing of the Communist Party of Canada in 1923, at a convention in Toronto. The YCL later became affiliated with the Young Communist International.

Originally known as the Young Workers League (YWL) due to the War Measures Act proscription of communist and other radical organizations in Canada, the lifting of the act in late 1923 saw the name change to its current form. Leslie Morris was the League's first General Secretary, serving from 1923 to 1924. The League soon became a member of the Young Communist International (YCI), an international association of similar bodies from around the world. Notably, the YCI included the USSR's Komsomol which served as the model for all other member organizations.

According to early organizer Dave Kashtan, the YCL "served as an educational organization for young workers and students, educating young people 'in the spirit of socialism'." Some of the League's earliest organized efforts took place in major cities such as Toronto, Montreal, Winnipeg and Vancouver, finding notable success among the youth of immigrant communities. The interest of young people in the YCL reflected the times. The recent success of the October Revolution (which established the USSR) and the Western response to it had great impact on some Canadian workers. Although Canada's economy was in a boom, some youth could still remember the post-war unemployment and misery which abounded immediately after the First World War.

The YCL's stated purpose was to organize young workers and students toward achieving better working conditions and an enhanced quality of life; though its constitution declared it to be independent and without party affiliation, it publicly supported the policies of the Communist Party of Canada. According to Kashtan, who became a YCL organizer at age 17, "We believed that socialism offered the only remedy for unemployment and poverty."

By 1928, the League operated 40 schools in Canada with an attendance of 2,000 children. YCL organizers in Montreal around that time included Fred Rose and Sam Carr, who would later become leaders of Canadian Communism.

=== 1930s ===
The onset of the Great Depression inflicted great suffering and hardship on Canadians. The YCL noted in its seventh national convention of August 1934, noted the conditions of "unemployment, hunger and misery".

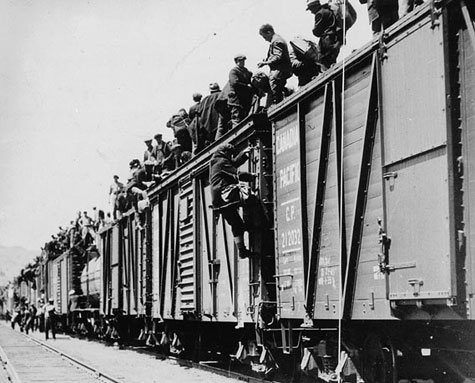
Strikers from unemployment relief camps climbing on boxcars in Kamloops, British Columbia

Although the total membership was never large, the YCL's influence and activities in youth movements during the Great Depression were notable. YCL members were involved with unemployed movements, peace activism, trade union activism and campus organizations.

Under the slogan "Work and Wages", YCL members worked to organize the unemployed who populated relief camps across the country. "The leading preoccupation of the YCL when I became secretary," Maurice Rush says in his autobiography, "was to organize unemployed youth". Like many other observers, Rush (who was leader of the YCL in British Columbia after 1935) claims that the YCL was active in the Relief Camp Workers' Unions (RCWU), and played a role in mobilizing relief camp youth to participate in the On-to-Ottawa Trek. During the Trek, many working people opened their homes and cupboards to the protestors, sometimes sharing family relief rations. Communist women in Vancouver issued a call for a solidarity action, and five thousand working-class women came out to a special "Mother's Day" demonstration on behalf of the camp workers and to demand the closing of the camps.

Informed by Vancouver's mayor that the limited scope of the Municipal Council was ill-equipped to address their claims, the British Columbia branches of the YCL and the Communist Party of Canada together with the Camp Workers' Union decided to march on Ottawa, believing that only action on a national scale could motivate the Bennett Conservative government to hear their concerns. YCL member Arthur (Slim) Evans was elected leader for the cross-country journey.

Bennett was widely criticized for his handling of the situation. Later that year, the Bennett government fell in the election, providing impetus to the movements for public health care, education, unemployment insurance and other social safety-net reforms.

In the same period, a Pioneers movement of young children with Communist or sympathetic parents was organized with membership numbering around 6,000. Under the leadership of the YCL, the Pioneers published its own magazine with a circulation of roughly 4,000.

The YCL's mandate was not limited to the plight of unemployed youth. In 1935, an official Communist club was established at the University of Toronto. As British Columbia YCL leader Maurice Rush noted, "The members realized that the struggle for a decent life for the young generation of the Thirties required broad, united public action by all sections of young people. We worked tirelessly to build that unity, with considerable success.

Together with changing conditions domestically and internationally with the rise of fascism, this led to a new conception of the YCL and its role in the struggle.

=== Rise of fascism and the Canadian Youth Congress ===
As the 1930s progressed, Fascism was growing in Europe, Asia, and in North America itself. With the Japanese invasion of Manchuria in 1931 and Fascist Italy's invasion of Ethiopia, Canadian Communists joined those sounding a warning against the growing threat fascism presented.

Some right-wing students at the University of Montreal organized demonstrations against the League, which became violent, involving bricks being hurled.
At the same time, "the Mayor of Montreal banned protest meetings supported by labour organizations."

Together with the Communist Party, the YCL began reaching out to youth organizations across the country. A joint youth council sprang up in Winnipeg, followed by others around the country. In May 1936, the Canadian Youth Congress was founded at a national conference in Ottawa and prepared delegates for the World Youth Congress held in Geneva later that summer.

Among the Congress's aims was the intention to act as a lobby group on issues of peace, education and unemployment. To that end, the Ottawa conference produced the Declaration of Rights of Canadian Youth, resolutions on Canadian youth and world peace, and the proposed Canadian Youth Act. RCMP security bulletins show leading members of the YCL to have been enthusiastic proponents of the Congress and among its key organizers. As the likelihood of war increased, efforts to mobilize Canadian youth for peace took center stage alongside efforts to pass the "Youth Bill", a document which sought economic protection for youth and the repeal of the Military Service Act.

At its peak, the CYC had a constituent membership of over 400,000 and its annual national conferences were attended by over 700 young people. The second Canadian Youth Congress in Montreal in May 1937 saw a drive to broaden the scope of the movement and to increase participation among French-Canadian youth. British Columbia organized their own BC Youth Congress, which was initiated by the Young Men's Christian Association (YMCA) in conjunction with the League. Annual conferences were held from 1936 to 1940 where CYC members continued to speak out against the rising tide of fascism until 1942.

Antifascism became a major position of the Congress, and Congress representatives became involved in activities that supported Loyalist Spain which the YCL strongly championed.

=== Spanish Civil War ===
The first major battle against fascism occurred in Spain, when General Franco mobilized his troops against the democratically elected government of the Spanish Republic; inciting the Spanish Civil War. Assistance to the Spanish Republican forces came from around the world, including Canada.

Throughout the Spanish Civil War, the YCL joined with other organizations to organize the Mackenzie-Papineau Battalion in which YCL members fought with Republican troops. With the assistance of the Communist Party of Canada, 1200 Canadians made their way to Spain.

But help came in all forms. For example, YCLers active in the Workers Sports Association helped organize support:

The majority of the members (of the Workers Sports Association) were young needle trades union members. ... The largest crowd ever at the games in Fletcher's Field took place at a soccer game between the Toronto and Montreal WSA clubs in support of Dr. Norman Bethune's Blood Unit in Spain. Many thousands of Montrealers rallied to give their support to the struggle to "Save Democracy in Spain."

Actions like this earned the WSA the attention of the police in cities like Montreal, Toronto, Ottawa and Vancouver, where WSA clubs were under police surveillance. "A boxing event was arbitrarily cancelled. In Toronto, hall owners were warned that their hall licences would be cancelled should the premises be rented for WSA functions. A police raid of the Vancouver WSA club led to the confiscation of its membership lists and the club's equipment." In BC, League members organized "Girls Brigades" to raise aid for Spain, a solidarity effort which won worldwide attention.

After the Spanish Civil War, the YCL continued its anti-fascist actions and published a newspaper, "The Young Worker" until the League and the Communist Party were banned in 1940. Canadian Communists re-organized themselves as the Labor-Progressive Party while the YCL became the National Federation of Labor Youth.

The NFLY was not formed as an explicitly Marxist-oriented organization, but instead based on the concept of the 'popular front.' In some instances it merged with chapters of the Co-operative Commonwealth Youth Movement, the youth wing of the social democratic Co-operative Commonwealth Federation. This policy was contrary to that of the CCF and resulted in the expulsion of numerous Communists from the party's ranks. While the new NFLY grew rapidly, the Federation reconsidered this approach after the war and re-oriented itself as a communist youth organization. In November 1945, the NFLY was a founding member of the World Federation of Democratic Youth.

=== Post-World War II, Korea and the Cold War ===
The NFLY along with the LPP faced repression throughout the Cold War. The NFLY attempted to fight growing anti-Communist sentiment and isolation through efforts in the peace movement, including a campaign against the Korean War.

Their efforts at this time included supporting the Canada-wide protest known as the Candy bar protest. The price of a candy bar in 1947 was 5 cents, but when the end of wartime price controls saw a three cent price increase, young people protested. According to CBC news, "Young people informally affiliated with the National Federation of Labor Youth flood[ed] the streets bearing placards protesting the 3-cent candy bar price hike to 8-cents each." Young people across Vancouver Island protested outside confectionery shops, and demonstrations were not limited to big cities. On April 30, 1947, approximately 200 children stormed the Victoria legislature demanding action. A day later in Toronto, students from three different secondary schools staged a mass protest. In Fredericton, children combined their sugar rations to make large masses of homemade fudge. There was a demonstration in every major city. "The kids' national boycott of more expensive candy was no laughing matter for stunned proprietors who watched their sales fall eighty percent overnight. Child pickets besieged storeowners with whistles, armbands and placards bearing slogans like 'Don't be a Sucker! Don't Buy 8 Cent Bars!'"

A cross-country protest was planned for May 3. The protest was quelled, however, by the Toronto Telegram's accusations that the National Federation of Labor Youth was a communist front determined to "plant a few of the seeds of Marxism."

Around the same time, the Federation also launched a campaign in support of Julius and Ethel Rosenberg and worked with organizations like the Student Christian Movement to bring youth to the World Festival of Youth and Students in Prague (1947), Budapest (1949), Berlin (1951), Bucharest (1953), Warsaw (1955), and Moscow (1957).

=== End of the Cold War ===
In 1958, a divide appeared at the Labor-Progressive Party congress following the 1956 Soviet invasion of Hungary, Nikita Khrushchev's Secret Speech and allegations by J.B. Salsberg about anti-Semitism in the Soviet Union under Stalin and Khrushchev. Following the divide and the lifting of relevant prohibitions, the party reformed as the Communist Party of Canada while the NFLY re-organized as the Socialist Youth League of Canada and began publishing a newspaper called Scan. At the May 1960 meeting, the SYL voted to change its name to the Young Communist League.

=== Cuban Revolution, Vietnam War and YCL ===
In 1968, the Communist Party of Canada officially restarted the Young Communist League.

A delegation from the YCL travelled to North Vietnam to interview Ho Chi Minh.

Unlike the NFLY, the new YCL was largely sidelined by more radical youth groups aligned with the New Left. This was especially true in the student movement, where it was unable to play an effective role in preventing the dissolution of the Canadian Student Union in the late 1960s. With offices across the country, the YCL resumed publishing The Young Worker, which became New Horizons.

=== 1980s ===
The YCL benefited from the proposals of the USSR which were understood as calling for an end the arms race and for disarmament by the resurgent and broad anti-war movement in the early 1980s. The League changed the name of its publication to Rebel Youth, following the Cuban revolutionary youth group by that name. The 80s also saw renewal of YCL leadership in many areas, leading to a more open and active approach by the League to youth struggles.

The YCL also supported the developments in El Salvador and Nicaragua, sending a delegation to help with the 1989 Nicaraguan coffee harvest. The YCL also sent a member on a fact-finding mission to Palestine about the situation in the Gaza strip. Several members also toured the Soviet Union, and the YCL organized for the 1985 and 1989 youth festivals in Moscow and Pyongyang, respectively.

But the late 1980s were also a time of growing political and ideological disagreement within the League over the new policies of the Soviet Union, with Glasnost and Perestroika. But they were also a time when the YCL began to fight for queer-rights and take a more militant pro-feminist standpoint.

=== Ten-year liquidation ===
1990 saw a major debate develop in the YCL around the changes in the international socialist movement that were taking place at that time. This had also lead to a deep crisis in the CPC that followed the counter-revolution or dissolution of the Soviet Union. The Communist Party of Canada began an internal debate which would later be described as a struggle for control of the party or a bitter internal factional fight leading to a split. By the end of the split, the group nominally led by George Hewison had formed the Cecil-Ross Society while those asserting to be the "Leninist core of the Party" retained the name of the CPC. The Cecil-Ross Society advocated the transformation of the CPC into a broad-left political organization. Until the time of their agreed separation, both sides attempted to direct the Party and its associated political and financial assets. The initial battles of the ideological dispute over the future of the Communist Party of Canada were quickly carried into the YCL. Here the Hewison group's effort attempted to wind-down the YCL and build a new organization known as "Rebel Youth".

Merle Terlesky's leadership saw the closing of the central YCL office after he returned from a 3-month trip to the USSR in 1991. Seeing little interest across the country in carrying on any form of youth organization, he did little to rebuild after the divisive convention. When Terlesky spoke at a YCL-USA convention and informed them that the YCL Canada has given up on Marxist and Leninist ideals, it was not received well. For a short time Terlesky even attended meetings of the I.S. ( International Socialists) in Toronto after the YCL ended, and then quit the Toronto left scene entirely and returned to his home province of Alberta. Shortly after, Terlesky denounced his involvement in Communist politics, as well as his queer-positive and pro-feminist views and became involved in the right-wing populist Reform Party of Canada, anti-abortion groups.

Terlesky's leadership appeared to have marked an end to the Canada's organized communist youth. While some members joined the Cecil-Ross organization, many former YCLers simply left communist politics altogether. A smaller core group of former YCLers chose to stay with the CPC, putting most of their efforts into rebuilding the party. In a few short years, the YCL had gone from a dynamic and active youth organization to not existing. For the next eleven years, from 1992 to 2003, there would be no active YCL in Canada.

=== Reorganization ===
While the break-up and dissolution of the Young Communist League of Canada in the early 1990s was widely understood as a symbolic of a permanent defeat of Leninist ideas in the youth and student movement, both the currency of revolutionary politics among Canadian youth and the YCL's inactivity proved to be temporary.

The 1990s saw a major push of student activism as labour and social movements were invigorated to fight the massive cut backs initiated by the governing Liberal Party of Canada. In Quebec, the 1995 referendum exposed the crisis of confederation, which the communists argued was rooted in the capitalist inequality of nations and included the oppression of aboriginal nations. Indigenous youth were at the fore-front of the rise in aboriginal militancy from the east to the west with the so-called Oka Crisis on Mohawk land, and the Guftason Lake Standoff in unceded Secwepemc territory. On the other hand, the problems of ideological clarity which had not been resolved in the 1980s continued. Opportunist ideas such as anarchism had filled the gap left by the Leninist left with a strong hostility to political parties, which intersected with opportunist social democratic ideas rejecting revolutionary change. In fall of 2003 a conference in Vancouver was held which formed a Young Communist League Preparatory Committee. In 2004–2005, the YCL was among a leading group which came together to organized a delegation to the 16th World Youth Festival in Caracas. Soon after the YCL requested to be readmitted to the World Federation of Democratic Youth, and began re-organizing in Quebec.

=== Rebuilding convention ===
In March 2007 the Young Communist League of Canada held a small three-day convention in Toronto, the 24th Central Convention of the YCL and the first since the 1991 dissolution. The convention adopted the framework for the re-establishment of the YCL especially a Constitution continuing the principles of democratic centralism. A Declaration of Unity and Resistance recognized among other things the dynamic and militant contribution of youth in the movement; the urgency of united action against war, environmental and ecological crisis; the multi-national character of Canada; the necessity for socialism; and the relationship of the YCL with the CPC.

== Current policies and campaigns ==
At its 2007 Convention, the YCL laid-out a 12-point agenda in its "Declaration of Unity and Resistance" stating that its short-term goal was to help build youth resistance, and its long-term goal was to build socialism. The 12 immediate points of resistance are:

1. Peace
2. Jobs
3. Free, Accessible, Quality Education
4. Equality
5. A Democratic Solution to the National Question
6. Organize Young Workers
7. Internationalism and Solidarity
8. Freedom and Democracy
9. Stop Privatization! Protect and Expand Social Services
10. Defend and expand Canada's sovereignty including indigenous sovereignty and self-determination for Quebec
11. Culture and Leisure
12. Environmental Sustainability

The YCL organizes regular summer camps, schools, conferences and seminars on topical issues like the economic crisis and youth.

The YCL joined the World Federation of Democratic Youth (WFDY) on February 3, 2008.

== Recent central conventions ==
The Young Communist League held its 25th Central Convention in September 2010 at the University of Toronto. In May 2014 the YCL held its 26th Central Convention, again at the University of Toronto. The purpose of the convention was to elaborate the YCL-LJC's policy on current questions, debate updates to the constitution, set an organizational plan of work, elect a renewed central leadership, and develop a united, militant and activist strategy for the youth fightback. The slogan of the Convention adopted was "with militancy and unity we will build the youth and student fightback".

Concerning Canada, the delegates outlined the role played by the YCL-LJC in the fightback against austerity and neo-liberal policies imposed by federal and provincial governments. Outlining what they characterized the end of the "honeymoon" between certain labour and social movements and the Trudeau government, the young communists insisted on what they see as the importance to mobilize for a fundamental change in favour of policies that guarantee the interests of the youth and the people instead of the interests of the monopolies. The delegates passed a series of votes criticizing what they described as the corporate policies of the Trudeau government and shared their concerns about the danger of the rise of the ultra-right and of fascism. They supported what they labelled "a democratic and voluntary solution to the national inequality moving from the actual status quo based on the genocide of indigenous nations and the oppression of Québec and Acadian nations.".

In August 2020, following the cancellation of the 28th Central Convention due to the COVID-19 pandemic, an "Extraordinary Convention" was held. The convention sought to address the worsening health crisis, as well as immediate issues of organizing both within the League and surrounding the worsening environmental crisis, housing crisis, and issues surrounding police brutality and racism. In addition to drafting a new political resolution and plan of work, a new Central Committee and Central Executive Committee was elected. Due to the passing of Pierre Fontaine, longtime leader of the Parti communiste du Québec, and his succession by then-YCL-LJC General Secretary Adrien Welsh, a new General Secretary was due to be elected; this position was filled by Toronto club organizer Ivan Byard.
