= Ivan Srebrenjak =

Soviet intelligence agent

- Born: 1903; Oprisavci near Slavonski Brod, Kingdom of Croatia-Slavonia, Austria-Hungary
- Died: 21 May 1942 (aged 38–39); Independent State of Croatia
- Military career
- Allegiance: Soviet Union
- Branch: NKVD
- Nicknames: Antonov, Doctor, Ivančić and Kemičar

Ivan Srebrenjak or Srebrnjak (1903 – 21 May 1942) ran a Soviet intelligence network for the NKVD in the Balkans at the beginning of Axis occupation of Yugoslavia.

Srebrenjak was born in 1903 in Slavonia and became a member of the Yugoslav Communist Party in 1928. After he killed a Yugoslav policeman in 1930 he left Yugoslavia and became a member of a group of Stalin's killers known as "liquidators" headed by Josip Broz Tito. When Axis forces occupied Yugoslavia in 1941 Srebrenjak returned to Yugoslavia and set up an NKVD centre in Zagreb, part of the Red Orchestra network. Tito considered him an enemy and requested approval from Stalin to relieve Srebrenjak of that position, which was refused by Stalin.

In 1942, Srebrenjak was informed on to the Gestapo and the Ustaše, resulting in his capture. In captivity Srebrenjak was the first person to identify Tito as leader of Communist resistance movement in Yugoslavia to German and Ustaše authorities. To minimize further damage to his position Tito ordered the murder of Srebrenjak and on 21 May 1942 Srebrenjak was killed in an Ustaše prison. This murder allowed Tito to seize and stabilize his position of leader of the Communist Party of Yugoslavia.

== Early life ==
Srebrenjak was born in 1903 in the village of Oprisavci near Slavonski Brod, at the time in Austria-Hungary (modern day Croatia). In 1928 he became a member of the Communist Party of Yugoslavia and in 1930 he murdered a police agent in Zagreb under the orders of the communist party. Because of this murder he had to leave Yugoslavia.

In the Soviet Union Srebrenjak became a Soviet citizen with name Petar Petrovič Antonov who was considered one of the most capable intelligence officers.

Initially, there were four centres of the NKVD in Zagreb, parts of the Red Orchestra, one operated by Andrija Hebrang, a second by Stevan Krajačić, a third by Josip Kopinič and a fourth by Ivan Srebrenjak.

== In France ==
After leaving Yugoslavia Srebrenjak first went to Paris in France and joined a group of Stalin's killers known as "liquidators" headed by Josip Broz Tito, whose members were also Vittorio Vidali, Vlajko Begović and Ivan (Stevo) Krajačić. In Paris Srebrenjak killed Yugoslav agent Ilija Šumanovac.

== During World War II ==
When Axis forces attacked Kingdom of Yugoslavia in April 1941, Srebrenjak came from France to Zagreb to run an "information point" for Soviet intelligence in Zagreb. In Zagreb Srebrenjak became a head of the Soviet intelligence network of the NKVD for the Balkans. Srebrenjak operated from this centre in Zagreb together with his wife Frančiška Srebrenjak (nee Klinc), who was a secret agent of the Yugoslav police and later the Gestapo. According to some sources she had a love affair with Stjepan Đaković, the elder son of Đuro Đaković.

Srebrenjak was the first victim of Tito's ambitions to become Stalin's intelligence officer not only for Yugoslavia but also for other Balkan countries. In a telegram sent to Tito on 1 July 1941, Kopinič asserted that Popović, Končar and Srebrenjak are enemy spies. Srebrenjak believed that some of Tito's close associates, like Ivo Lola Ribar and Boris Kidrič were in the service of the Yugoslav regime.

At the beginning of August 1941 Tito sent a telegram to the Comintern insisting that Srebrenjak transfer all of his men to Communist Party of Yugoslavia control for training them as saboteurs because he did not organize this training himself and members of the party lost confidence in him.

Tito hated Srebrenjak because he reported to Stalin about Tito's struggle for leadership of the Communist Party of Yugoslavia. He requested approval from Stalin to relieve Srebrenjak of his post, accusing him of being a Gestapo collaborator, but this attempt failed thanks to Srebrenjak's powerful Soviet patrons.

The Ustaše and the Gestapo were already informed about Srebrenjak's activities by Slavko Đukić, who was an associate of Srebrenjak, but it was Joco Đaković, the younger son of Đuro Đaković who was arrested in December 1941, who identified Srebrenjak to the Ustaše.

In February 1942 Srebrenjak was arrested by the Ustaše and tortured until he revealed names of Soviet agents in Croatia, Greece, Bulgaria and Italy. This was a major success for the Ustaše while Axis forces arrested ten to fifteen people based on Srebrenjak's testimony, including Andrija Hebrang. Srebrenjak and Hebrang were the first people to identify Josip Broz Tito as the leader of the Communist Partisan forces to the Ustaše and Axis special police, though Srebrenjak gave his name as Josip Brozović. Tito sent Krajačić to kill Srebrenjak.

According to Cenčić, Srebrenjak's wife Franciška was released from an Ustaše prison under suspicious circumstances, Hebrang was exchanged while Srebrenjak was killed in an Ustaše prison under the orders of Josip Broz Tito.

== Sources ==
- Simić, Pero (1993). U krvavom krugu: Tito i raspad Jugoslavije. Filip Višnjić. ISBN 9788673631233.
- Marković, Života (1988). Tito i Užička republika. Vesti. ISBN 9788673190136.
- Vinterhalter, Vilko (1968). Životnom stazom Josipa Broza. Kultura.
- Kljakić, Dragan (1983). Dosije Hebrang. Partizanska knjiga.
- Šibl, Ivan (1967). Zagreb 1941. Naprijed.
- Clissold, Stephen (1975). Yugoslavia and the Soviet Union, 1939-1973: A Documentary Survey. Oxford University Press. ISBN 978-0-19-218315-6.
- Крањц, Маријан Ф (2006). Plava garda: zaupno poročilo četniškega vojvode in generalštabnega polkovnika Karla I. Novaka, poveljnika slovenskih četnikov. Pro-Andy. ISBN 978-961-91794-3-7.
- Labović, Đurica; Vučetić, Nikola (2002). Crveni orkestar: najveći obaveštajci sveta. Novi dani. ISBN 978-86-81975-07-7.
- Pirjevec, Jože (22 May 2018). Tito and His Comrades. University of Wisconsin Pres. ISBN 978-0-299-31770-6.
- Irvine, Jill A. (1993). The Croat Question: Partisan Politics in the Formation of the Yugoslav Socialist State. Westview Press. ISBN 978-0-8133-8542-6.
- Cenčić, Vjenceslav (1983). Enigma Kopinič. Izdavačka radna organizacija "Rad".
