= Chocolate bar strike =

1947 protest by Canadian children

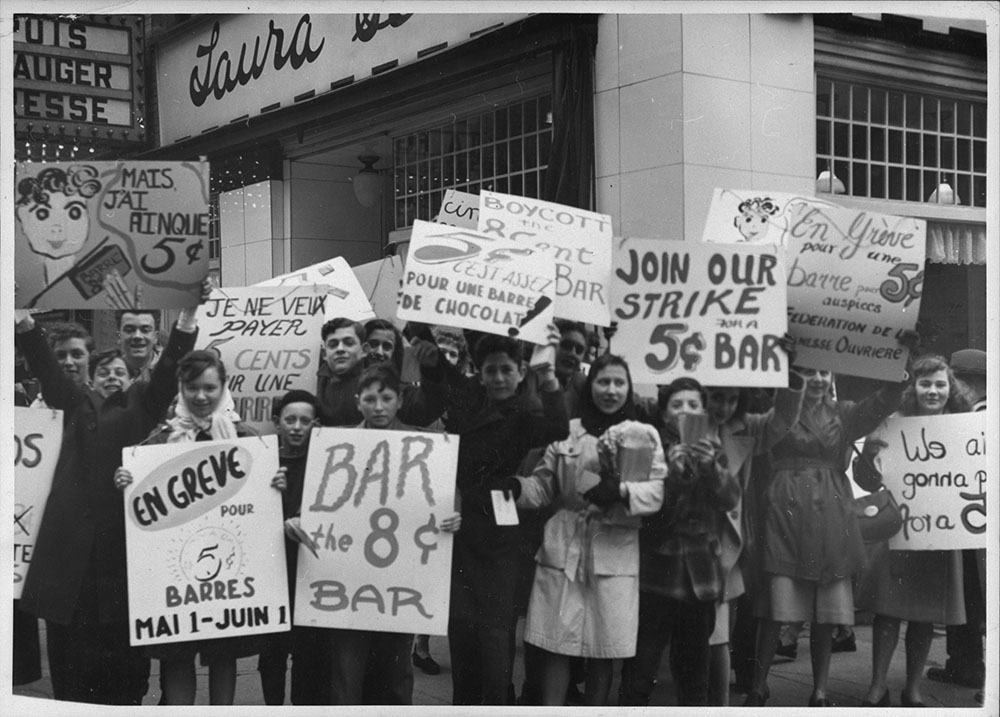
Montreal children protesting the 1947 candy bar price increase outside a Laura Secord candy store

The candy bar protest, also known as the 5 cent chocolate war, the 5 cent war and the chocolate candy bar strike, was a short-lived 1947 protest by Canadian children over the increase in price of chocolate bars from five to eight cents. The strike began in Ladysmith, British Columbia, and spread across the country to include protests in Calgary, Edmonton, Winnipeg, Montreal, Quebec City, Ottawa, Toronto and the Maritimes. The strike ended when the Toronto Evening Telegram published an editorial suggesting that one of the organizations allied with the children, the National Federation of Labour Youth, was backed by communists.

== Timeline ==
=== Origins ===
On April 25, 1947, Canadian manufacturers of chocolate bars raised their prices from 5 to 8 cents per bar, citing increasing production costs. In particular, manufacturers cited problems with the cocoa bean supply and the elimination of wartime government subsidies as the reason for the price increase.

The strike began on the same day in Ladysmith, British Columbia, at the Wigwam Cafe, a confectionery store and luncheonette. Shocked by the 60% price increase of the Wigwam's chocolate bars, of which there had been no advance notice, children organized a protest in front of the store, calling for a boycott of the bars, and adopting the slogan Don't be a sucker. They staged their initial protest using a slogan-covered 1923 black McLaughlin Buick, which was followed by 40 protesting children. As they marched, the children sang:

We want a 5 cent chocolate bar
8 cents is going too darn far
We want a 5 cent chocolate bar
Oh, we want a 5 cent bar.

They protested for three noon-hours in a row, and were reported by the local newspaper, the Ladsysmith Chronicle. Carrying homemade signs, some of which read DONT BUY 8¢ BARS. LOWER PRICES TO 5¢. WE ARE SMART and LET THE SUCKER PAY 8¢ WE WON'T, the children also posed for a Vancouver Sun newspaper photographer. The Sun ran the story and photograph on April 26.

=== Spread of protests ===
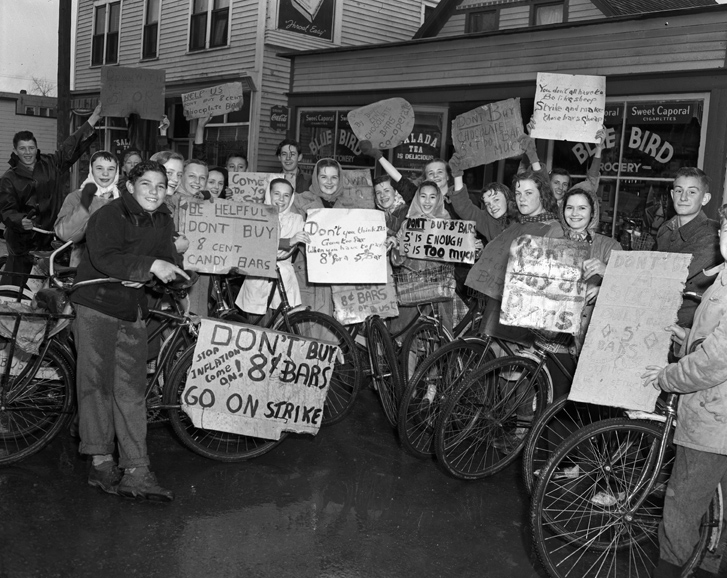
The candy bar protest in Edmonton, Alberta

By April 29, the strike had spread to nearby Victoria, British Columbia, the provincial capital, where an estimated 200 children stormed the city's legislature building. The city's Times Colonist newspaper of April 30 carried the story with the headline "Children Invade Legislature building", along with a photograph of placard-carrying children on the legislature's steps.

As news coverage of the strike increased, the strike spread east. In Burnaby, British Columbia, a bicycle parade of protesting children is reported to have blocked Kingsway, a main thoroughfare. Sales of chocolate bars fell by a reported 80%, with Winnipeg merchants reporting a day where they failed to sell any bars.

In Edmonton, Alberta, 300 children, accompanied by a police escort, marched down the city's Jasper Avenue to protest the increase on April 29. A few days later on May 2, 500 Toronto schoolchildren marched along Bloor Street to protest against the price hike. On May 3, in the Canadian capital of Ottawa, 60 students marched on Parliament Hill. Led by ten buglers, one carried a sign saying "We'll eat worms before we eat eight-cent chocolate bars".

=== Communist claims ===
Around the same time as the Toronto march, an anonymous tipster told the Toronto Evening Telegram that the National Federation of Labour Youth, which had supported the Toronto protest, had communist backing. In the article, the paper wrote that

Chocolate bars and a world revolution may seem poles apart, but to the devious, Communist mind, there is a close relationship. They don't realize it, but the indignant students parading with their placards demanding a 5 cent candy bar have become another instrument in the Communist grand strategy of the creation of chaos.

The Financial Post newspaper followed up with an article headlined Communists run candy bar strike, recruit young children for parade.

Fearing being associated with the supposed backers, the strike's organizational supporters and the parents of the child strikers began to withdraw. The Youth Action Committee of Victoria BC, which had supported the strike, withdrew their support on May 5. Vancouver's Sat-Teen Club, whose 2500 members had supported the strike, withdrew and stated that "mob demonstrations and strikes are not consistent with the ideals of the club".

Ultimately, the strike fizzled out and the price of chocolate bars was maintained at eight cents.

=== Reactions and legacy ===
In response to the strike, on May 2 the candy manufacturer Rowntree's published an open letter in Canadian newspapers titled Why You Pay 8¢ for a Rowntree Chocolate Bar. A representative of the Moirs chocolate company spoke on CBC radio to defend the price increase. On May 7, 1947, the Toronto company Willards' Chocolates published an open letter in the Toronto Star with the headline "5¢ Chocolate Bars just aren't possible NOW".

The strike was the subject of the 2000 documentary film The Five Cent War. The 2007 novel Maggie and the Chocolate War by Canadian author Michelle Mulder was based on the protest. The strike was memorialized in 2017 with a public mural in Chemainus, British Columbia. The mural, based on the original Vancouver Sun photograph, depicts the original Ladysmith protesters eating ice cream rather than chocolate bars because, at the time of the protest, ice cream was still priced at five cents.
