= František Reichentál =

Jewish Eastern European modern artist

František Reichentál (May 6, 1895 – April 2, 1971), also known as Frank/Ferenc, Reichenthal/Reichen-tal, was a Jewish Eastern European modern artist. He is known for paintings depicting his experiences of childhood poverty, captivity as a prisoner of war in Russia, escape from the Nazis, and finally fleeing from the Communists to start over in the United States.

== Early life ==
Reichentál was born in Lehnice (Velky Leg), Austria-Hungary, the son of Janos Reichentál and Fanny Weinberger. He had one sister and one brother. He attended Grammar School in Bratislava and Győr.

== World War I ==
In 1916, he served in the Austro-Hungarian Army, where he was captured by the Russians and sent to prisoner of war camp. In addition to disrupting his studies, the war years took the lives of both his brother and father. He spent the October Revolution in 1917 in captivity.

== Education and early career ==
Despite the war ending in 1918, Reichentál was not allowed to leave Russia. Captured officers were being held at the time by Russia as hostages for the release of Hungarian Communists. He was, however, given permission to study. From 1917 to 1919, he taught at art schools in Irkutsk. Between 1920 and 1921, he enrolled at the Petrograd Art Academy and studied under V. V. Belyayev. After Petrograd, Reichentál painted and taught art with Marc Chagall. He had expos is both Moscow and St. Petersburg, with works being purchased by the State.

== Career in Czechoslovakia ==
After returning home in 1921 to what had become Czechoslovakia, Reichentál mounted exhibitions in Berlin, Prague, and Paris. In 1922, Reichentál's works focused on social issues revealed in a style of Expressionism. He became a member of the Union of Artists in Slovakia, and had an exposition in Prague.

In 1925, he exhibited drawings, engravings and lithographs in Berlin and Dresden. Further exhibits were held at the Parliament Building in Prague and the Galerie au Sacre du Printemp in Paris in 1926. In Bratislava, all the works in a 1931 exhibition were purchased. The same year, he founded a private art school.

Reichentál worked with various media and styles, but was best known for his expressionist works, such as Street, Cafe and Dock Workers. Later he developed his characteristic style in cubism. His travels brought him to Sub-Carpathuan Ruthenia (now Zakarpattya in Ukraine) where he painted many Jewish-themed works, including Bhaur from Sub-Carpathian Ruthenia, At Prayer, Jewich Street, and Talmudists.

Reichentál became a professor at the School of Applied Arts in 1933 and married Margaret Fleischmann in 1936. Their daughter, Mary, was born two years later. By 1938, his work was included in an exhibition of Slovak works in New York.

== World War II ==
German troops were stationed in Slovakia beginning in March 1939. For their safety, Reichentàl and his family moved to Hungary. During World War II, Jews were not allowed to work, so the family tried unsuccessfully to emigrate to France with his family. After the German occupation in 1939, they escaped to Budapest, procuring fake identifications (as the Janos family) to escape capture. Finally, in 1945, the Russian army took control from the Germans. Fluent in seven languages, including Russian and German, Reichentál served as a translator for the Russians through the remainder of the war.

While his wife and child survived the war, Reichentál's mother, two sisters, and niece were killed in concentration camp. His wife's parents and sister were also killed by the Nazis.

== Post-war Czechoslovakia ==
Reichenthal's work took on a more powerful tone as he chronicled many of the atrocities of the war. Such works as "The Lone Survivor", "Gas", "The Arrival", and a portfolio of 16 drawings, entitled "Arbeit Macht Frei" depicted the barbarity of the Nazi holocaust.

Anti-Semitism was still rife in Czechoslovakia, and when the communists finally came to power, Reichentál was arrested and beaten. He sought over a period of four years to emigrate to the United States. After obtaining a visa, and with funding from the Hebrew Immigrant Aid Society, he brought his family to New York in 1950 on the SS Washington. and was naturalized in 1954.

== Career in New York ==
In the U.S., Reichentál continued to paint and draw, but was at first unknown there and to earn a living also worked in other artistic realms, such as illustrating comics and fashion drawings under the pseudonyms François Gerome and Ben Ari. His artistic style moved from cubism to abstract modernism, including collages and bright oil paintings. He held a number of exhibitions towards the end of his life, in New York, Miami, Chicago, Austria, Germany, Vienna, Dresdon, Paris, Toronto, and Israel. Reichentál died in New York on April 2, 1971. After his death, his works continued to be sold to collectors and auctioned. He has had posthumous exhibitions in New York and two in Bratislava, in 1992 and 2013. His work is currently in several museums and private collections. The most recent exhibition of his work was in early 2013 at the Bratislava City Gallery.

== Museums with the works of František Reichentál (partial list) ==
- National Museum & Museum of Jewish Culture, Bratislava
- National Gallery, Prague
- Bratislava City Gallery, Bratislava
- Slovak National Gallery, Bratislava
- Eastern Slovakia Gallery, Kosice
- Holocaust Museum & Educational Center, Glen Cove, New York
- Jewish Museum, New York, New York
- Museum of Modern Art, Miami, Florida
- Museum of Western Art, Moscow
