= American Youth Congress =

United States-based youth rights organisation (1935–1940)

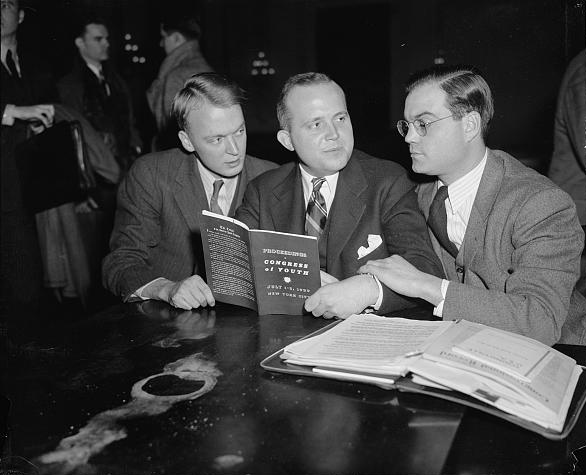
- AYC leaders Jack R. McMichael, William W. Hinckley and Joseph Cadden before the House Un-American Activities Committee, 1939
- Abbreviation: AYC
- Formation: 1935; 91 years ago
- Dissolved: 1940; 86 years ago
- Purpose: Youth rights advocacy
- Location: United States
- Affiliations: World Youth Congress Movement

The American Youth Congress (AYC) was an early youth voice organization composed of young people from across the United States who gathered to discuss the problems facing youth as a whole in the 1930s.

At the time, United States citizens were not legally considered adults until the age of 21, and so the group focused on the under-discussed economic exploitation of adolescents and children.

The formation of the AYC is seen as a precursor to the establishment of the National Youth Administration. Both the AYC and the NYA are notable for the support lent them by First Lady Eleanor Roosevelt.

Affiliated with the World Youth Congress Movement, the AYC hosted the 1938 Second World Youth Congress at Vassar College in Poughkeepsie, New York.

== History ==
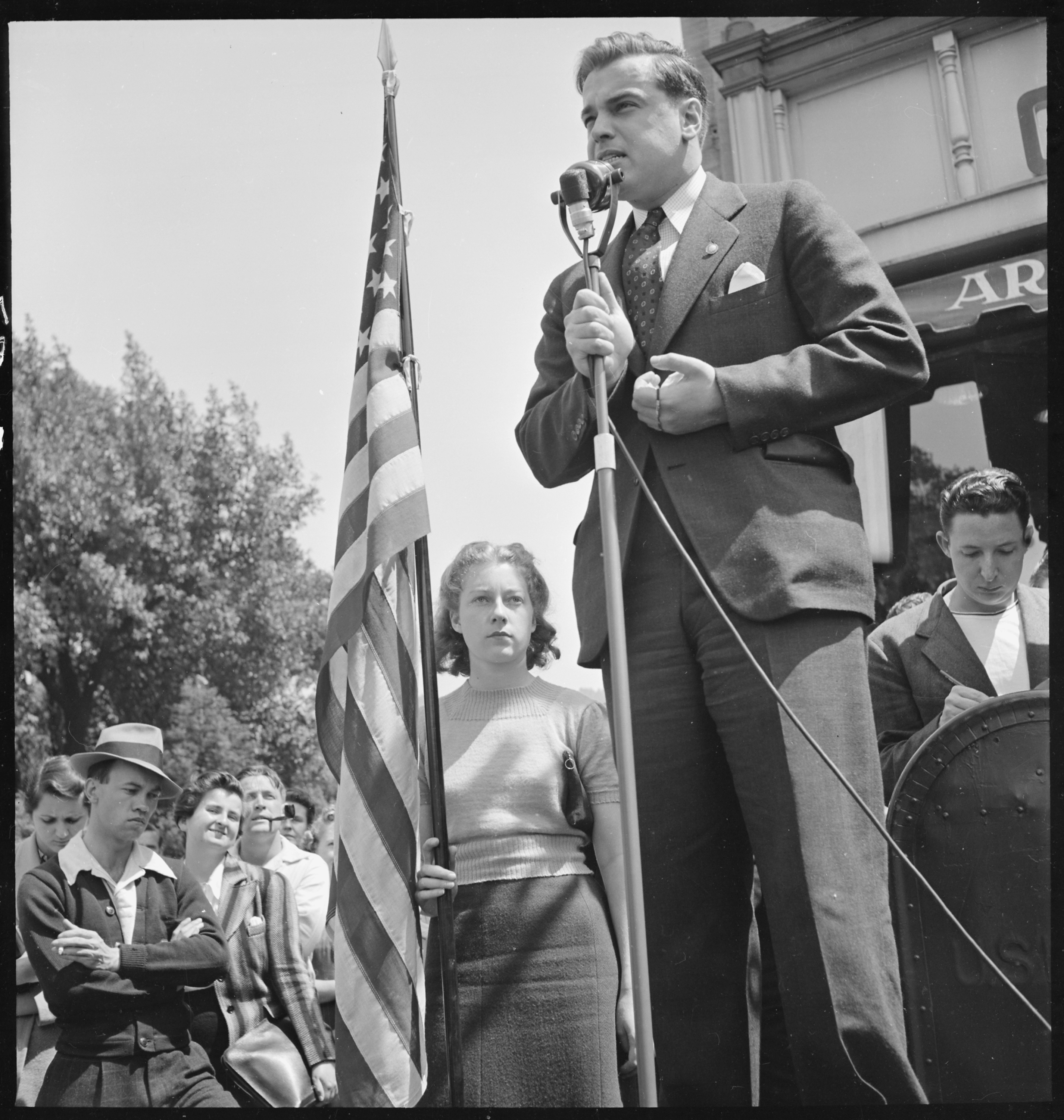
Abbot Simon speaking at the University of California, Berkeley on April 19, 1940

The American Youth Congress, or AYC, was formed in 1935 to advocate for youth rights in U.S. politics, and was responsible for introducing the American Youth Bill of Rights to the U.S. Congress. First Lady Eleanor Roosevelt's relationship with the AYC eventually led to the formation of the National Youth Administration (NYA). While speaking of the NYA in the 1930s, Eleanor Roosevelt expressed her concerns regarding ageism, stating that "I live in real terror when I think we may be losing this generation. We have got to bring these young people into the active life of the community and make them feel that they are necessary."

On July 4, 1936, the AYC issued the Declaration of the Rights of American Youth. The document addressed several issues, chief among them being the inalienable rights they believed were due to young people, and the economic problems which most affected them. Its Chairman in 1937 was William W. Hinckley, a member of the Communist-led Psychologists League. By 1939 the movement claimed 4,697,915 members in 513 affiliated organizations nationwide.

On February 10, 1940, members of the AYC, as guests of First Lady Roosevelt, attended a picnic on the White House lawn where they were addressed by President Roosevelt from the South Portico. Appealing to them to condemn not merely the Nazi regime but also all other dictatorships, Roosevelt was reportedly booed by the group. Afterwards, many of the same youth picketed the White House as representatives of the American Peace Mobilization.

Later in 1940, despite Eleanor Roosevelt's defense of the organization, published under the title "Why I still believe in the Youth Congress," the American Youth Congress was disbanded.

== See also ==
- World Youth Congress Movement
- One World Youth Project
- National Youth Administration
- Youth participation
- Youth movements
- National Commission on Resources for Youth

== External articles ==
- Eleanor Roosevelt, Why I Still Believe in the Youth Congress
- The Student Movement of the 1930s, Joseph P. Lash, Interview.
