= World Youth Congress Movement =

The World Youth Congress Movement was an international left-wing popular front made up of youth groups from around the world from 1936 to 1940 promoting world peace, international co-operation, and progressive reforms.

== History ==
The World Youth Congress Movement was founded in 1936 as a result of the First World Youth Congress, organized by the International Federation of League of Nations Societies in Geneva from August 31 to September 6, 1936, and involving 700 delegates with representatives of Christian, students’, women's, youth and political organizations from 36 countries, including Belgium, Bulgaria, Canada, Czechoslovakia, Denmark, France, Irish Free State, Netherlands, the Soviet Union, Spain, Sweden, the United Kingdom, the United States of America, and Yugoslavia and delegates from provisional committees in Australia, China, New Zealand, Palestine, Romania, and Switzerland. The congress was boycotted by Germany and Italy, both of which withdrew from the organizing committee before the conference began. Japan also did not send delegates.

Its objectives were:

(a) To provide an opportunity for youth of all countries to exchange ideas on international affairs and to reach agreement upon a common plan of international cooperation for the prevention of war and the organisation of peace
(b) To bring about the co-operation of youth of all countries, based upon mutual understanding and mutual respect for opinion, to attain those ends, and to take common action to give effect to the decisions of the World Youth Congress;
(c) To strengthen the links between the organisations of youth themselves and between youth and the League of Nations Societies.

The 1936 Congress resulted in the establishment of the World Youth Congress Movement with an executive committee and international council. While the WYCM maintained a relationship with the International Federation of League of Nations Societies, it was autonomous and not under the IFLNS's auspices.

The First World Youth Congress was organized as a result of a decision by the International Federation of League of Nations Societies assembly in 1933 that “the hour had come for the generation which was not old enough to have participated in the world war itself to take action for the reform of international and social policies that their elders had followed with such unhappy results".

The Second World Youth Congress was held in August 1938 at Vassar College in Poughkeepsie, New York. In an attempt to include youth of all political tendencies, the WYCM's international council invited the Hitler Youth to send a delegation. The German organization said it would attend on the condition that German was made an official language of the Congress, no German émigré organizations would be allowed, no criticism would be made of the Nazi regime, and that all Communists be barred from attending. The WYCM refused to accept the final demand and the Hitler Youth boycotted the congress as a result.

The Second Congress was widely criticized by anti-Communist politicians and media for the involvement of Communists and was investigated as a possible communist front organization by the newly formed House Un-American Activities Committee, but had the support of Eleanor Roosevelt and other liberal progressives. The second congress included 700 delegates and observers from fifty-four countries and included delegations from the colonial world including Indonesia, Burma, and India while the South African delegation added Black delegates and the Mandatory Palestine delegation included Arab delegates, in contrast to their delegations to the first congress. The Soviet Union, Germany, and Italy did not send delegations, while Japan and the Dominican Republic only sent observers. The Catholic church and the Boy Scouts of America boycotted the meeting.

The WYCM faced divisions after its 1938 congress as the European situation deteriorated in the lead-up to World War II. The Swiss national committee resigned due to a loss of faith in collective security during the Munich crisis. Socialist Youth International, the youth movement associated with social democratic parties, also stopped attending meetings of the WYCM's council. The Molotov-Ribbentrop Pact of 1939 between Nazi Germany and the Soviet Union undermined the WYCM's anti-fascism. On 31 August 1939, one day before the German Invasion of Poland and the start of the Second World War, the WYCM's International Council issued an emergency resolution reaffirming its support for the Vassar Peace Pact, denouncing “the policy of delivering entire peoples over to the aggressor nations,” and calling upon youth to unite against military aggression. The Molotov-Ribbentrop Pact would bring the Communist movement's popular front strategy to an end, with Joseph Stalin instructing the Comintern on September 9, 1939, to end the anti-fascist Popular Front strategy and instead oppose "imperialist war". It would also see a split between liberals and Communists, with most of the WCYM's remaining liberal supporters withdrawing their support.

The WYCM continued until 1940, with its international secretary, Elizabeth Shields-Collins, announcing that the work of the WYCM would continue but be in the form of agitating for peace rather than anti-fascism, despite the WYCM's earlier support for collective security. The WYCM ceased to function and several national affiliates such as the Canadian Youth Congress and the Australian Youth Council were banned as subversive organizations due to their opposition to the war effort.

Following the German invasion of the Soviet Union in June 1941, Shields-Collins and other Communists reversed their position about the war to see it as an anti-fascist struggle. In London, Communists organized the International Youth Rally for Victory at Albert Hall on 11 October 1941 Shields-Collins as former secretary general of the WYCM, was chosen to set up a preparatory committee to organize the International Youth Council of Great Britain as an umbrella group for anti-fascist youth and exiles from Allied countries living in Britain. This, in turn, led to the foundation of a World Youth Council in 1942 with representatives from 29 countries. With the war coming to an end, the World Youth Council organized a World Youth Conference in London at Albert Hall with 600 delegates from predominantly Communist-led organizations in November 1945 which founded the Communist-led World Federation of Democratic Youth.

== Resolutions ==
The 1936 World Youth Congress passed resolutions supporting internationalism and calling for strengthening the League of Nations as a tool for world security and for preventing war, against protectionism, for improved treatment of colonies and against war and called on delegates to promote peace and internationalism in their own countries.

The 1938 World Youth Congress at Vassar College passed resolutions calling for social justice as a requirement of peace, in favour of labour reforms, for humanitarian aid to victims of aggression, and for boycotts and intervention against fascist aggression. The congress also passed the Vassar Peace Pact opposing wars of aggression, for fair peaceful settlement of disputes and collective security when such diplomacy fails, against aerial bombardment of towns, in favour of the self-determination of the colonial world.

The peace pact stated:

Article I. We swear to develop a spirit of fraternity and collaboration between the youth of all nations, to help unite the youth of our own nations and to work for unity with young people of all other countries without distinction of race, creed or opinion.
Article II. We solemnly condemn any war of aggression directed against the political independence of the territorial or administrative integrity of a State.
Article III. We pledge ourselves to do all in our power to guarantee that the youth of our countries never participate in any war of aggression against other states.
Article IV. We agree to bring pressure to bear, whenever the circumstances arise, upon our respective authorities to take the necessary concerted action to prevent aggression and to bring it to an end, to give effective assistance to the victims of treaty violations and aggression, and to refrain from participating in any aggression whether in the form of supply of essential war material or of financial assistance.
Article V. We solemnly declare that the bombardment of open towns and civilian populations constitutes a violation of the canons of humanity and the rule of conduct among nations, and we undertake to mobilize the forces of world opinion to condemn any such action and to give aid for the relief of the victims.
Article VI. We, recognizing that there can be no permanent peace without justice between nations and within nations, or without their recognition of the right to self-determination of countries and colonies seeking their freedom, undertake in a peaceful manner to set right injustices against peoples, regardless of race, creed or opinion, to establish political and social justice within our own countries and advocate that international machinery be immediately set in motion to solve differences between nations in a peaceful way.

== See also ==
- American Youth Congress
- Canadian Youth Congress
- World Federation of Democratic Youth - founded after World War II
