= Gabriel Nadeau-Dubois =

Canadian politician (born 1990)

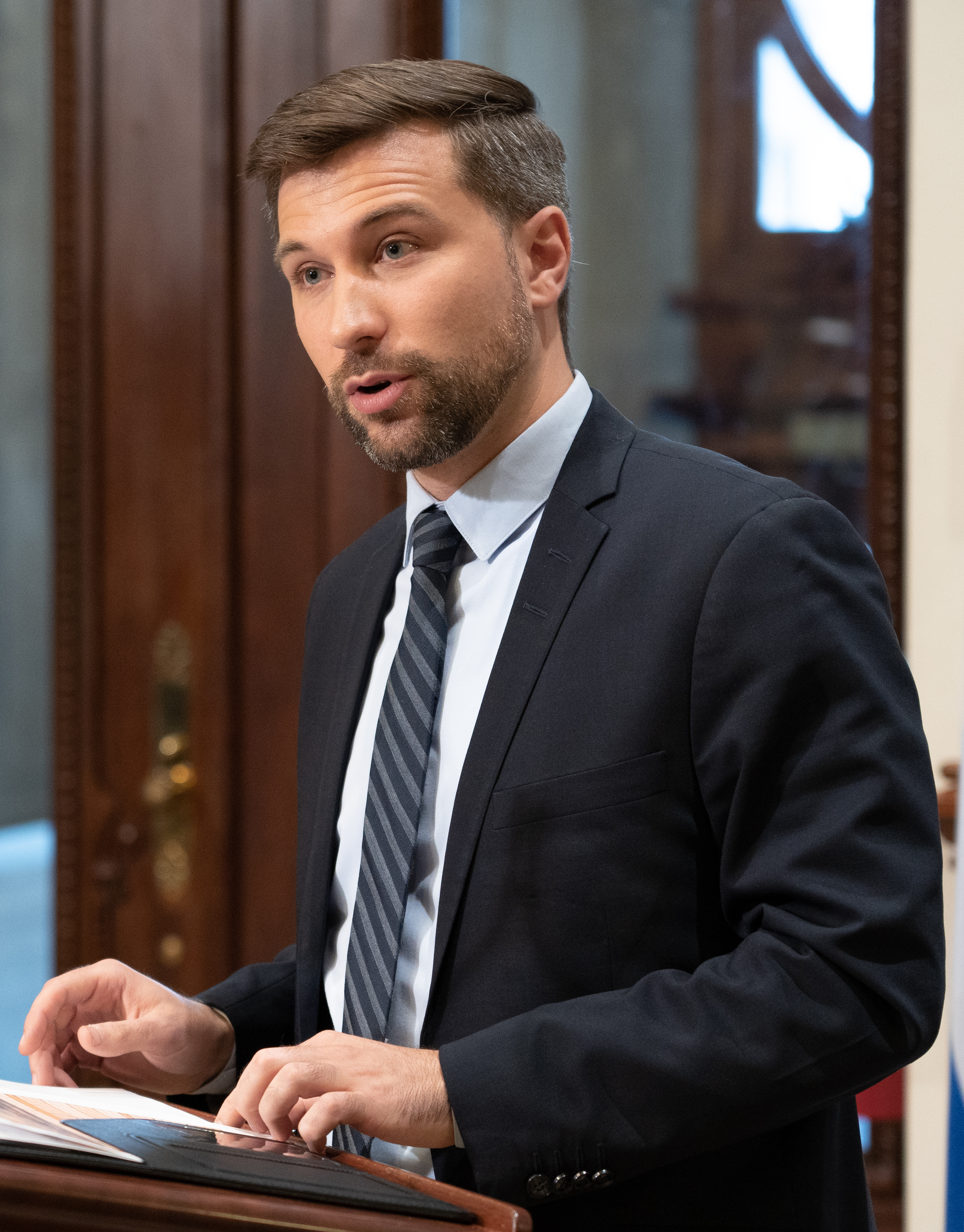
- Nadeau-Dubois in 2020

Co-Spokesperson for Québec solidaire
- In office 21 May 2017 – 20 March 2025
- Preceded by: Andrés Fontecilla
- Succeeded by: Guillaume Cliche-Rivard (interim)

Member of the National Assembly of Quebec for Gouin
- In office 29 May 2017 – 27 August 2026
- Preceded by: Françoise David
- Succeeded by: Alexandre Boulerice

Personal details
- Born: 31 May 1990 (age 36) Montreal, Quebec, Canada
- Party: Québec solidaire
- Education: Université du Québec à Montréal (MSo)
- Occupation: Politician
- Awards: Prix impératif français (2013)
- Nickname: "GND"

Gabriel Nadeau-Dubois (French pronunciation: [ɡabʁijɛl nado dybwa]; born 31 May 1990) is a Canadian politician who was the co-spokesperson of the party Québec solidaire from 2017 to 2025, and was elected as a member of the National Assembly of Quebec on 29 May 2017. Before his arrival in active politics, he was well known for his role during the 2012 Quebec student protests as co-spokesperson of the Coalition large de l'Association pour une solidarité syndicale étudiante (CLASSE), a broad coalition of student associations opposed to the $1,625 tuition hike introduced by Jean Charest's government. He quit that position on 9 August 2012.

== Early life ==
Gabriel Nadeau-Dubois was born in a family of activists: his parents met in the Jeunesse Étudiante Chrétienne (Young Christian Students). His father was also an environmental and union activist.

When he was young, he went with his father to demonstrations and union assemblies where he was supposed to do his homework, but listened to the speeches instead. He became interested in politics and began reading La Presse hoping to become an international journalist.

At the Collège Regina Assumpta, a private school in Montreal, he obtained good grades but questioned everything, although he "was not a rebel", according to his father, Gilles Dubois. When the school's management wanted to appoint student representatives, he opposed the decision, saying that students should elect them instead. His request was realized the following year.

== Post-secondary student life ==
In Fall 2007, Gabriel Nadeau-Dubois joined the Association pour une solidarité syndicale étudiante (ASSÉ) as a student at the Collège de Bois-de-Boulogne. That year, the student association decided in a general assembly to no longer be affiliated with the ASSÉ. Nadeau-Dubois unsuccessfully tried to get the student association to rejoin the ASSÉ. The young activist was nevertheless elected as vice-president of his student association and was in charge of external affairs.

In 2009, he started a humanities degree at the Université du Québec à Montréal (UQAM). In order to focus on the student struggles, he enrolled as a part-time student, with only three credits per session. He received a Millennium Scholarship. During the 2010–2011 session, he was elected as a member of the ASSÉ's newspaper committee. In April 2010, he was also elected as Communications Secretary and spokesperson. In December 2011, he became a co-spokesperson of the ASSÉ's Coalition large (CLASSE), a broad coalition of student associations opposed to the $1,625 tuition hike introduced by Jean Charest's government, along with Jeanne Reynolds.

Gabriel Nadeau-Dubois first obtained a degree in Humanities from UQAM, then pursued a minor in philosophy at Université de Montréal. At the end of 2016, he finished a master's degree in sociology at UQAM.

=== 2012 student protests ===
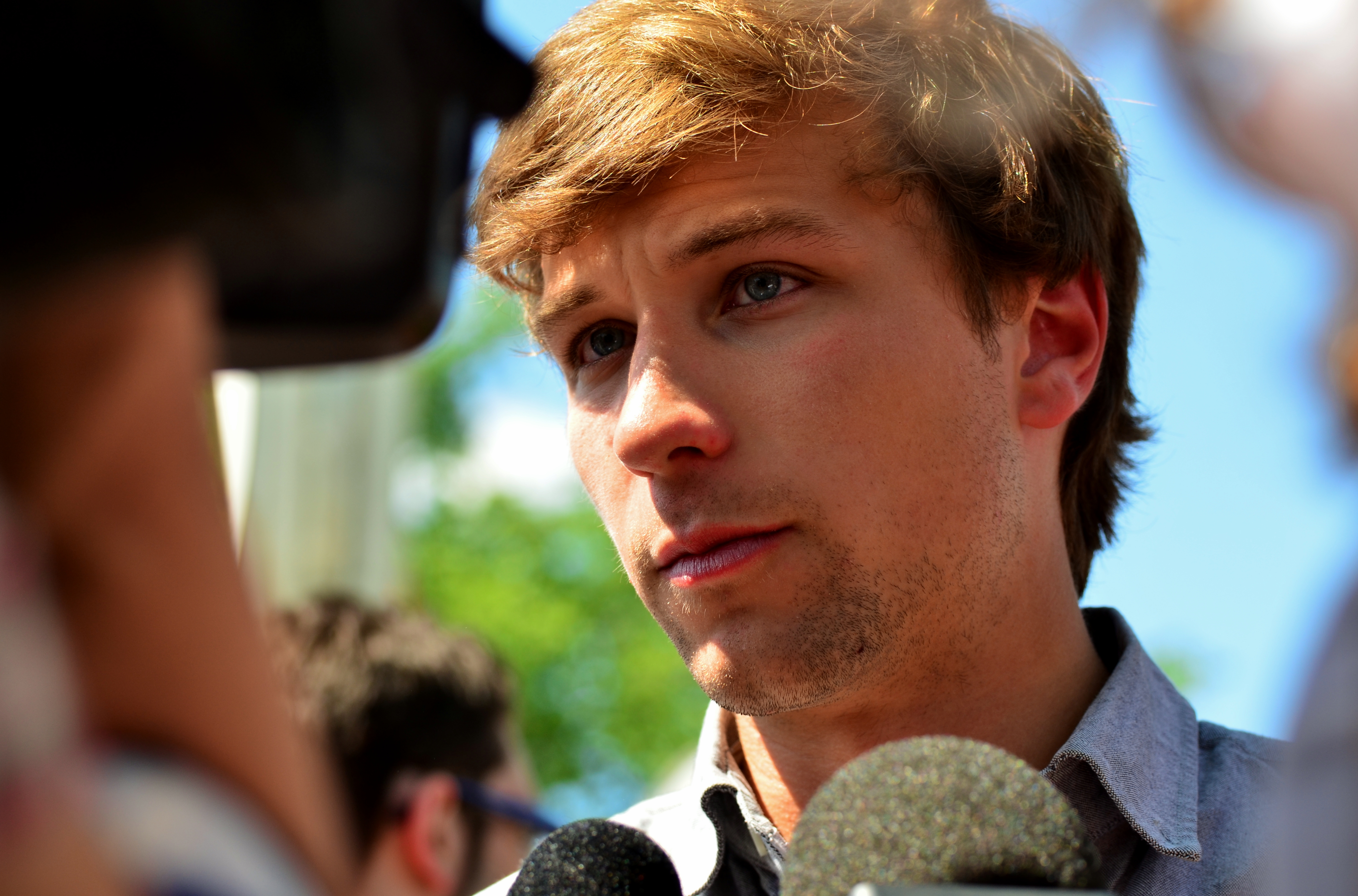
Gabriel Nadeau-Dubois at a news conference during the 22 June 2012 protest in Quebec City.

Ever since the beginning of the 2012 Quebec student protests, Nadeau-Dubois was considered by the media as one of the leaders of the student movement, along with Léo Bureau-Blouin and Martine Desjardins, if not the leader (although they were officially referred to as spokespersons). Indeed, the CLASSE is based on direct democracy; it does not have any leaders, but instead has spokespersons, of which Nadeau-Dubois was one along with Jeanne Reynolds.

This personification of the movement led to several rumours, personal attacks and even five death threats a week, both on Twitter and by mail. He was consequently protected by three or four bodyguards at demonstrations.

In June, he admitted that he was "psychologically tired" and announced that while he would request a renewal of his term as spokesperson at the CLASSE's congress, he would quit his position at the end of the strike, citing "both internal and external pressure". He qualified the media coverage of him as "ironic", since he was the least powerful of the three student association leaders, yet he was also the one who was watched the most by the media.

As a result of the constant attacks on him, Nadeau-Dubois resigned from his role as CLASSE spokesman on 9 August 2012. In his resignation letter, published by Le Devoir, a left-leaning periodical, he expressed his opinion that the strike movement had raised deeper issues and "questioned corrupt institutions". However, he regretted the fact that Jean Charest was still Premier [of the province of Quebec], saying that his government was "the incarnation of corruption".

==== Morasse v. Nadeau-Dubois ====
On 12 April 2012, a visual arts student at Laval University, Jean-François Morasse, asked for and obtained an injunction from Justice Jean Hamelin of the Quebec Superior Court against his student association to be able to continue his studies. The student, whose provisional injunction was renewed twice, was able to go to class. He nevertheless decided to press charges of contempt of court against Gabriel Nadeau-Dubois after having heard what he said to the TV channel RDI on 13 May:

I think that it is completely legitimate for students to take action to make sure that the democratic choice to strike is respected. It is very regrettable that there is a minority of students who use the courts to bypass the collective decision that has been taken. We think it is totally legitimate for people to use the necessary means to make sure the strike vote is respected. And if that requires picket lines, we think that is a completely legitimate way to do it.

— Gabriel Nadeau-Dubois

Even though the injunction was no longer effective since Bill 78 was passed by the National Assembly on 28 May, Article 32 of the special law allows for contempt of court procedures to continue. This article was nicknamed the "Gabriel Nadeau-Dubois clause" by Parti Québécois MNA Véronique Hivon.

Morasse, who is represented pro bono by Maxime Roy Martel, asked that Nadeau-Dubois be given a prison sentence. The prosecutor, who was referred by the Quebec Bar Association, said that Nadeau-Dubois "incited other people not to respect the court's decision. And this incitation had a very wide reach, because [Gabriel Nadeau-Dubois] has a lot of media coverage." It is the only court case regarding contempt of court relative to an injunction which was given during the student protests.

Gabriel Nadeau-Dubois, who pleaded not guilty to the accusation, said that the situation was "sad and regrettable". The hearings for this case were undertaken on 27 and 28 September 2012, at the Court of Quebec. He was found guilty of contempt of court on 1 November 2012. On 2 December, Nadeau-Dubois launched a campaign called Appel à tous ("appeal to everyone") to raise funds to appeal the verdict. On 5 December, Justice Denis Jacques sentenced Nadeau-Dubois to 120 hours of community service, but his sentence was suspended until his appeal was decided.

In January 2015, Quebec's Court of Appeal overturned the ruling. Three justices found for Nadeau-Dubois, who was acquitted.

Morasse appealed that decision to the Supreme Court of Canada. In October 2016, writing for the majority, Justices Clément Gascon and Rosalie Abella stated that in Nadeau-Dubois's comments, picketing does not equal blocking classes, the latter being contra to the injunction.

== Political career ==
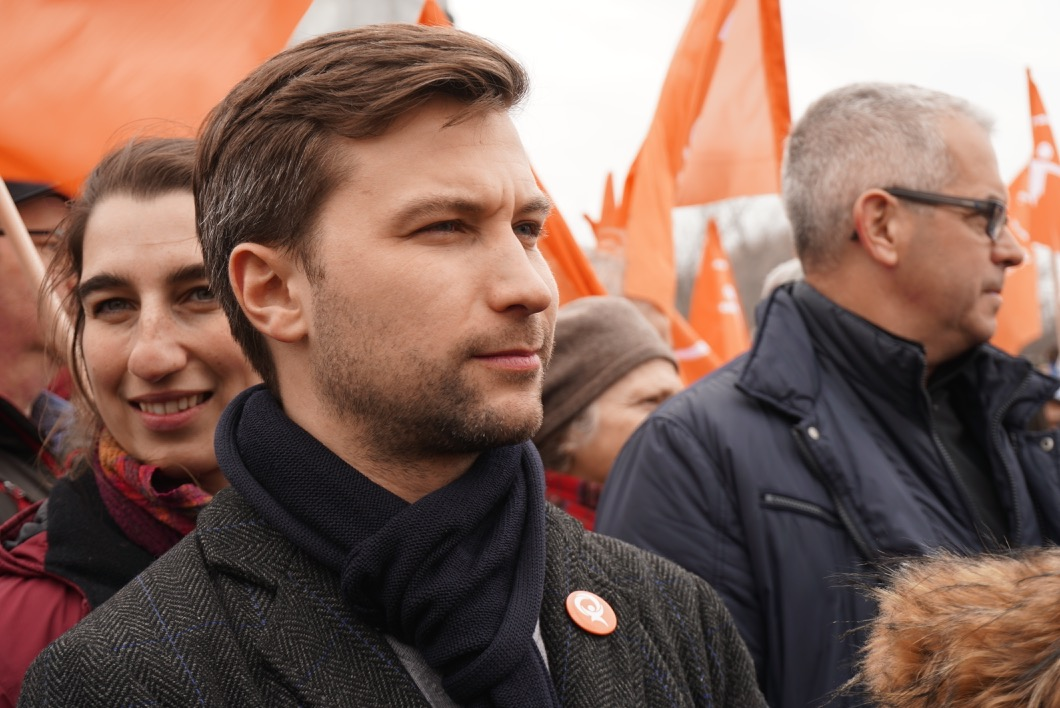
Nadeau-Dubois at the March for Climate Action, Montreal in 2019.

In the past, Nadeau-Dubois has said he was not interested in being a politician. He stated that the best way to achieve social justice and free education is by being an activist in social movements. He said to a journalist in March 2012 that partisan politics discourage him from getting involved.

Shortly after quitting as CLASSE spokesperson, Nadeau-Dubois was hired by the CSN-Construction on a contractual basis. His job mainly consisted of research on the history of collective agreements in the construction industry.

In 2013, he was awarded the Prix impératif français for his "commitment to defending accessibility to post-secondary education for all, in a society that is as just as possible."

In 2014, he won the Governor General's Award for French-language non-fiction for Tenir tête, a memoir of the events of 2012. Speaking on the popular Quebec television show Tout le monde en parle on 23 November 2014, he announced he had donated his $25,000 Governor-General's Award prize money to fight the Energy East pipeline project, and that he has raised a further $385,000 to support the fight against the project, which is owned by TransCanada Pipelines and would funnel oil sands bitumen via Eastern Canada for export to foreign markets.

In March 2017, Nadeau-Dubois decided to seek the nomination to be Québec solidaire's co-spokesperson, and also its candidate in the Montreal riding of Gouin vacated by Françoise David. Québec solidaire is a left-wing socialist party which also supports Quebec sovereignty. He stated that the Parti Québécois and the Liberals were his adversaries, with Option nationale, another sovereignist and left-wing party, being the only party who shares his worldview. Later that year, Option nationale merged into Québec solidaire.

Nadeau-Dubois won the byelection on 29 May 2017 and became MNA for Gouin. In the Quebec general election of 1 October 2018, Nadeau-Dubois again won Gouin for Québec solidaire, with 59.14% of the vote. He was, until 2025, the party's parliamentary leader and was the party's candidate for premier in the 2022 Quebec general election.

The party finished second in overall votes for the first time in its history, winning 15.4% of the vote and eleven seats, its most ever. On 20 March 2025, days after the 2025 Terrebonne provincial by-election, Nadeau-Dubois resigned as male co-spokesperson and announced that he would not seek re-election in the 2026 general election. He cited the challenges faced by Québec solidaire over the past two years for his resignation. During his tenure, he was criticized by some party members for moderating some of its policy positions.

== In literature ==
A novel titled Tenir parole was published in Spring 2017, whose protagonist is an embattled Nadeau-Dubois during the 2012 student strike and which is narrated from a first-person perspective.

== Honours ==
- Prix Impératif français 2013.
- Governor General’s Literary Awards 2014 for Tenir tête.

== See also ==
- 2012 Quebec student protests
- Association pour une solidarité syndicale étudiante
