= Quebec student protests =

Quebec student protests may refer to:

- 1996 Quebec student protests, in response to government plans to unfreeze university tuition costs
- 2005 Quebec student protests, in response to budget cuts in the Grants and Loans program
- 2012 Quebec student protests, in response to an increase in tuition fees
