= Fédération des associations étudiantes du campus de l'Université de Montréal =

FAÉCUM
- Formation: October 31, 1976
- Location: Montreal, Quebec
- Members: 37,500
- Parent organization: Université de Montréal
- Affiliations: Quebec Federation of University Students
- Website: faecum.qc.ca

The Fédération des associations étudiantes du campus de l'Université de Montréal (FAÉCUM) is an accredited federation of students' associations on Université de Montréal's campus. It encompasses 85 different students' associations and represents a total of 37,500 members. Its objective is to promote and defend different student interests.

== See also ==
- 2005 Quebec student strike
- List of Quebec students' associations
