= Tim Cronk =

Canadian football player (born 1987)

No. 36
- Positions: Fullback, long snapper

Personal information
- Born: June 22, 1987 (age 39); Kingston, Ontario, Canada
- Listed height: 6 ft 0 in (1.83 m)
- Listed weight: 245 lb (111 kg)

Career information
- University: Bishop's
- CFL draft: 2009: undrafted

Career history
- 2011–2013: BC Lions
- 2014: Saskatchewan Roughriders
- 2015–2016: Winnipeg Blue Bombers

Awards and highlights
- Grey Cup champion (2011)
- Stats at CFL.ca

Tim Cronk (born June 22, 1987) is a Canadian former professional football fullback who played in the Canadian Football League (CFL). He was first signed by the BC Lions on May 30, 2011, after going undrafted in the 2009 CFL draft and finishing his college eligibility in 2010. He played CIS football for the Bishop's Gaiters. On November 18, 2017, Cronk made his amateur MMA debut, winning by submission, 2 minutes into the first round. He attended Holy Cross Catholic Secondary School in Kingston.

== Professional football career ==
After completing his college eligibility at Bishop's University, Tim Cronk was signed by the BC Lions on May 30, 2011, as an undrafted free agent. He played with the Lions from 2011 to 2013, participating in 42 regular-season games. During his tenure, he contributed primarily on special teams and as a fullback, recording 20 special teams tackles and scoring one touchdown. Cronk was part of the Lions' roster that won the 99th Grey Cup in 2011.

In 2014, Cronk joined the Saskatchewan Roughriders, appearing in nine games that season. He then signed with the Winnipeg Blue Bombers in 2015, where he played until 2016, adding 20 more games to his CFL career. Over six seasons in the league, Cronk played a total of 71 regular-season games.
