= Serge Ménard =

Canadian politician

Serge Ménard MP
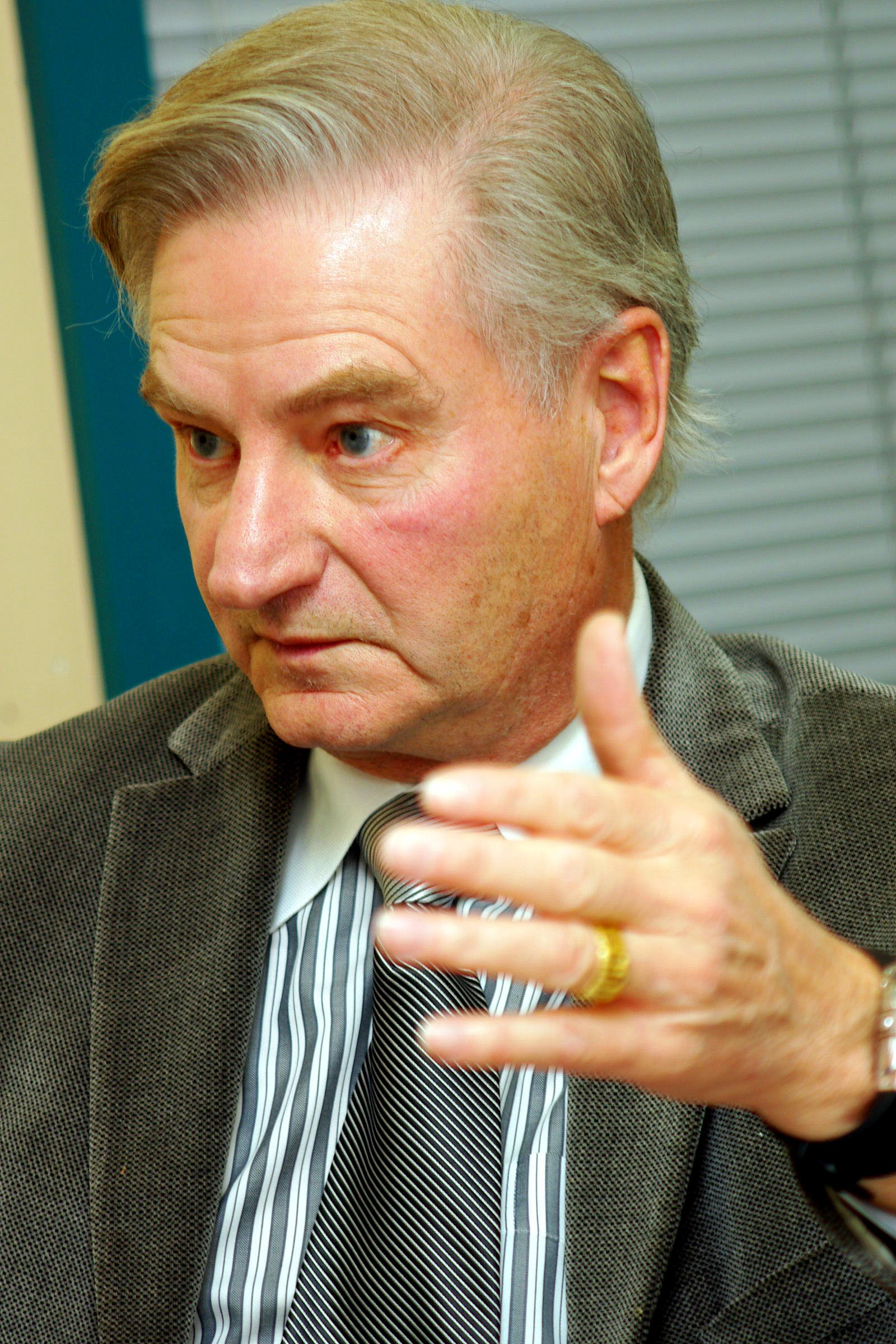

Member of Parliament for Marc-Aurèle-Fortin
- In office 28 June 2004 – 2 May 2011
- Preceded by: new riding
- Succeeded by: Alain Giguère

MNA for Laval-des-Rapides
- In office 13 December 1993 – 14 April 2003
- Preceded by: Guy Bélanger
- Succeeded by: Alain Paquet

Personal details
- Born: 27 September 1941 (age 84) Montreal, Quebec
- Party: Bloc Québécois, Parti Québécois
- Profession: Lawyer, law professor

Serge Ménard OQ (born 27 September 1941) is a politician from Quebec, Canada. He was a member of the National Assembly of Quebec from 1993 to 2003, and a member of Parliament from 2004 to 2011. Outside politics he has been a lawyer, lecturer and professor.

He joined HMCS Donnacona in 1959, within the framework of the UNTD (University Naval Training Division) and served in the Royal Canadian Navy until 1968. He was commissioned as an officer in 1962, spent his summers serving in Halifax, Hamilton and Victoria and was promoted to the rank of Lt. in 1964. The following year, in 1965, he was appointed executive officer of the UNTD in Montreal.

He was first elected as a Parti Québécois member of the National Assembly of Quebec in a 1993 by-election in the riding of Laval-des-Rapides. He was re-elected in 1994 and 1998, but defeated in 2003.

During that time he served under a number of Cabinet portfolios: Minister of Public Safety (1994–1996; 1998–2002; 2002–2003), Minister of State for the Greater Montreal & Minister Responsible for the Montreal Region (1996–1997), Minister of Justice and Attorney General (1997–1998) and Minister of Transport (2002–2003).

Ménard was elected as a member of the Bloc Québécois in the House of Commons of Canada in the 2004 Canadian federal election. He represented the riding of Marc-Aurèle-Fortin and was the Bloc critic to the Minister of Public Safety and Emergency Preparedness. He was re-elected in 2006 and 2008, but did not run in 2011.

Ménard was made an Officer in the National Order of Quebec in 2020.

Political offices
| Preceded by Robert Middlemiss, Pierre Bélanger, Normand Jutras | Minister of Public Security (Québec); 1994–1996, 1998–2002, 2002–2003 | Succeeded by Pierre Bélanger, Normand Jutras, Jacques Chagnon |
