= Cégep de Trois-Rivières =

Public college in Trois-Rivière, Quebec

Coordinates: 46.358056°N 72.568056°W

Cégep de Trois-Rivières is a French-language College of general and vocational education (CEGEP) in Trois-Rivières, Quebec, Canada. It is located at 3500 rue De Courval. It was established in 1968.

In 2021, the CEGEP offered 40 programs leading to a Diplôme d’études collégiales (DEC; Diploma of College Studies): 13 of these were pre-university programs, while 27 were career programs. It also has three College Centers for the Transfer of Technologies (CCTT) institutes, as well as business training services and continuing education programs. In addition to its two main pavilions, the CEGEP has six residences and an observatory.

== History ==
Established on May 15, 1968, the CEGEP de Trois-Rivières opened its doors to 2,200 students on September 10 that same year. In its first year, the CEGEP offered 7 pre-university and 11 career programs.

The CEGEP de Trois-Rivières was created by amalgamating eight collegiate institutions: the Institut de technologie de Trois-Rivières, the Institut de papeterie de la province de Québec, the Saint-Antoine, Saint-Joseph and Nicolet seminaries, the École d’aide sociale, the Écoles des infirmières and the Collège Marie-de-L’incarnation.

== Campus ==
The campus features 2 buildings approximately 700 meters (0,4 miles) apart.

=== Reference centres ===
The Bibliothèque Louis-Martel is a reference library with nearly 100,000 documents. It was created in 1968 by amalgamating the collections of five institutions: the Institut de technologie, the École d’aide sociale, the École normale Maurice Duplessis, the Séminaire Saint-Antoine and the École de papeterie. The library moved to its current location in the Humanities pavilion in January 1979. A second resource centre, the Matériauthèque, is located in the Science pavilion.

=== Stadium ===
The Diablos stadium opened on September 11, 2004, with seating for 860. It was funded with support from the city of Trois-Rivières, the CEGEP de Trois-Rivières' foundation, as well as several private-sector partners. The stadium was renovated in 2019 and as of 2021, it could seat 2,000.

=== Concert Hall ===
The Desjardins concert hall was officially opened on 20 October 2005. It can seat 175 people.

=== Theatre ===
The Théâtre du Cégep de Trois-Rivières was officially opened on May 25, 2006. It was funded with support from the city of Trois-Rivières and the Quebec government. It can seat up to 460 people.

== College Centers for the Transfer of Technologies ==
The Cégep de Trois-Rivières has three college centres for the transfer of technologies: the Quebec Metallurgy Center (CMQ), Innofibre - Centre d’innovation des produits cellulosiques (formerly known as the Centre spécialisé en pâtes et papiers) and the College Center for Technology Transfer in Telecommunications (C2T3).

Founded in 1985 as the Centre intégré de fonderie et de métallurgie, the Quebec Metallurgy Center (CMQ) aims to support Quebecois manufacturers' technological development in the metalworking sector. In 1989, the Centre spécialisé en pâtes et papiers (CSPP), currently known as Innofibre, was founded. Its main goal is to contribute to the Quebecois papermaking and biorefinery industries' technological status and sustainability by supporting new papermaking technologies and uses for biorefinery. In 2008, the College Center for Technology Transfer in Telecommunications (C2T3) was recognized as the third CCTT institution.

== Student association ==
The Cégep de Trois-Rivières's 4400 students are represented by the Association générale des étudiants du Cégep de Trois-Rivières (AGECTR). This association was part of the Fédération étudiante collégiale du Québec (FECQ) from 1992 to 2014. During a referendum held between May 1 and May 2, 2014, 80.25% of Cégep de Trois-Rivières students voted against maintaining FECQ membership. Many of the students expressed their opinions in favour of Quebec's independence during their General Assembly on November 26, 2019.
