= Table de concertation étudiante du Québec =

The Table de concertation étudiante du Québec (Quebec Student Roundtable) is a federation of students' unions formed in 2009. As of April 23, 2012, while the 2012 Quebec student protests, it comprises 60,000 students grouped into four member unions; by March 23, 2014, after many disaffiliation, it comprises 28,000 members, part of only one member union. Unlike the FEUQ or the Association pour une solidarité syndicale étudiante, it does not charge fees from students within their member unions for funding.

== Ex member unions ==
- Regroupement des étudiants en maîtrise et doctorat de l'Université de Sherbrooke (REMDUS), disaffiliated by referendum with a score of 70 % on January 28, 2014
- Association des étudiantes et des étudiants de Laval inscrits aux études supérieures (AELIÉS), disaffiliated during a special general assembly with a score of 89 % on March 10, 2014
- Students' Society of McGill University (SSMU), disaffiliated by referendum-election with a score of 81 % on March 21, 2014
- Confédération des associations d'étudiantes et d'étudiants de l'Université Laval (CADEUL), currently the only member of the Student Roundtable, but it have an executive mandatory for the dissolution of the organisation.

== See also ==
- Fédération étudiante universitaire du Québec
- Association pour une solidarité syndicale étudiante
- 2012 Quebec student protests
