= List of Quebec students' associations =

This is a list of students' associations in Quebec, Canada.

== Federations ==
- Fédération étudiante collégiale du Québec (FECQ) (in French)
- Union étudiante du Québec (UEQ) (in French)

== Universities ==
University	Student union	Links
Bishop's University	Bishop's University Students' Representative Council	
Concordia University	Concordia Student Union (CSU); Concordia Graduate Students Association (GSA); Concordia Engineering and Computer Science Graduate Students Association (ECGSA); Arts and Sciences Federation of Associations (ASFA)	Concordia Student Union; Concordia GSA; Concordia ECSGA; Arts and Sciences Federation of Associations (ASFA)
HEC Montréal	Association étudiante de la maîtrise et du doctorat de HEC Montréal (AEMD)	AEMD
McGill University	Students' Society of McGill University (SSMU); Post-Graduate Students' Society of McGill University (PGSS)	MCSS; PGSS
Université Laval (UL)	Confédération des associations d'étudiants et étudiantes de l'Université Laval (CADEUL)	
Université de Montréal (UdeM)	Fédération des associations étudiantes du campus de l'Université de Montréal (FAECUM)	Fédération des associations étudiantes du campus de l'Université de Montréal (in French)
Université du Québec à Montréal (UQAM)	Association Facultaire Étudiante des Sciences Humaines (AFESH)	AFESH-UQAM (in French)
UQ École de Technologie Supérieure (ETS)	Association des étudiants de l'école de technologie supérieure (AEETS)	
UQ Institut national de la recherche scientifique Montréal (INRS Montréal)		

== CEGEPs ==
- Association générale étudiante de Bois-de-Boulogne (AGEBdeB)
- Société générale des étudiantes et étudiants du Collège de Maisonneuve (SOGEECOM)
- Dawson Student Union (Syndicat des étudiantes et étudiants du Collège Dawson)
- Vanier College Students' Association (Association des Étudiantes et Étudiants du College Vanier; VCSA)

== See also ==
- List of Canadian students' associations
