= Martine Desjardins (activist) =

Canadian activist

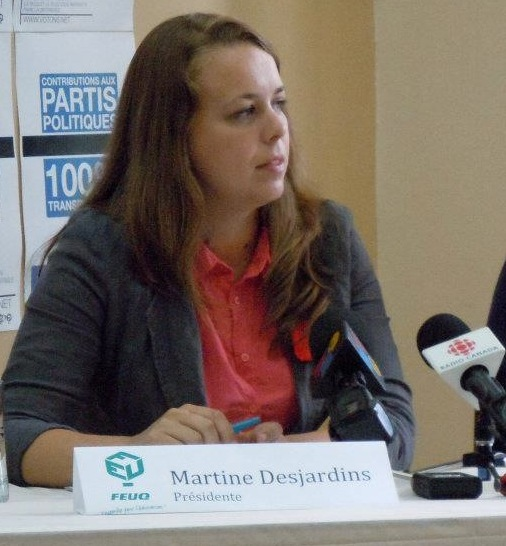
- in a press briefing, the day after the election call, August 2, 2012
- Born: September 4, 1981 (age 44); Montreal, Quebec
- Occupation: Activist

Martine Desjardins is a Canadian activist and media figure from Quebec. She was president of the Fédération étudiante universitaire du Québec during the 2012 Quebec student protests and was a Parti québecois candidate in the 2014 Quebec general election. Since then, she has been a political commentator for Le Canal Nouvelles, and was president of the Mouvement national des Québécoises et des Québécois from 2015 to 2017.
