= Anarchopanda =

Unofficial mascot of 2012 Quebec student protests

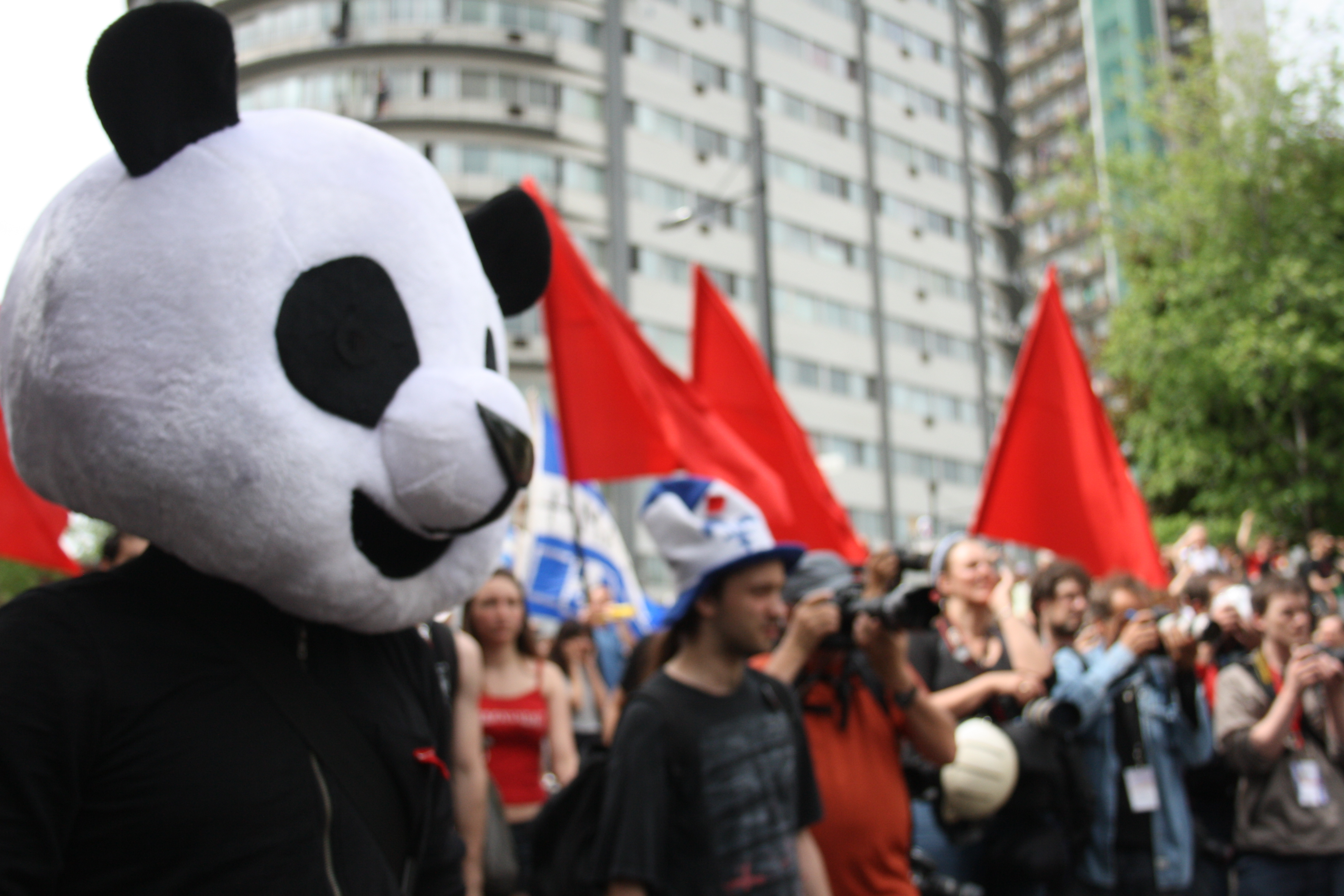
Anarchopanda during a protest in May 2012.

Julien Villeneuve, also known as Anarchopanda, (French pronunciation: [anaʁkopɑ̃da]) is a Canadian philosophy professor from the Collège de Maisonneuve known for dressing in a panda costume during the 2012 Quebec student protests, in which he hugged both students and police officers. His first appearance in the costume was at a protest on May 8, 2012. He stated that his aim in wearing the costume was to lower tensions and make protests safer for students. Villeneuve has a strong affinity for Plato, Aristotle and Plotinus, and identifies as an anarcho-pacifist.

In 2012, Montreal banned the use of masks in protests. Villeneuve protested the bylaw in costume, resulting in police seizing the costume's head in April 2013; it was returned several days later. The ban on protestors wearing masks was struck down by the Superior Court of Quebec in 2016, but the bylaw still required protestors to notify police of their routes for non-spontaneous protests. Villeneuve challenged the ruling in court, arguing that it did not go far enough and defined a "spontaneous protest" too narrowly. The bylaw was entirely repealed in 2019, to which Villeneuve said, "it's been a long time coming".

The Anarchopanda persona was discontinued in 2020 following public allegations of sexual assault against Villeneuve. Due to the allegations, several activist groups cut ties with him.

== See also ==
- Tía Pikachu
