= 2005 Quebec student protests =

- Date: February 24, 2005 – April 14, 2005
- Location: Quebec, Canada
- Methods: Street protesters; Occupations; Picketing; Student strikes; Hunger strike; Barricades; Online activism

The 2005 Quebec student protests were a series of student strikes and student protests in opposition to budget cuts of C$103 million in the Grants and Loans program by the Charest government. It occurred between February 24 and April 2005 and involved thousands of CEGEP and universities students from across Quebec.

== Background ==
During the 2003 Quebec general election campaign, the Liberal Party of Quebec, led by Jean Charest, made a promise to freeze education cost. Having to deal with a rough budget, and because of the election promise, the Quebec government changed the Grants and Loans program by transforming $103 million of grants into loans, nearly doubling the debt of the poorest students.

Coalitions representing most CEGEPs and universities started to negotiate with the government. Talks and protests, in the form of marches, went on for over a year. Students from most CEGEPs and universities took the streets on April 14, 2004 (the first anniversary of the Charest government's election) and November 10, 2004.

== Student strike ==
During their January 29–30, 2005 congress, the students' unions members of the ASSÉ (Association pour une Solidarité Syndicale Étudiante) and other independent students' unions decide to form the Coalition de l'Association pour une Solidarité Syndicale Étudiante Élargie (CASSÉÉ) to coordinate the upcoming strike campaign. ("Cassé" is a French word equivalent to "broken".)

The strike was initiated on February 21, by a member of the CASSÉÉ, the anthropology students' association from University of Montreal (Association étudiante d'anthropologie de l'Université de Montréal). But the real start was given on February 24 when over 30,000 students members of the CASSÉÉ, and a few other unions joined the strike.

The FECQ and the FEUQ, federations of CEGEP and university unions, called for a student strike on March 4 and March 9 respectively. By March 15, over 100,000 students were on strike. This turn of events surprised many, as these organizations were traditionally opposed to strikes/boycotts as a negotiation tactic.

On March 16, 2005 students from traditionally more moderate institutions like École Polytechnique de Montréal, as well as from Concordia University and McGill's Post-Graduate Student Society joined the strike for 24 hours. Between 10,000 and 100,000 students (80,000 being the number most reported) took the streets for a peaceful march in Montreal, creating the largest student protest staged in Quebec until March 22, 2012.

The École des Hautes Études Commerciales de Montréal and McGill University undergraduates Students' Society of McGill University joined the strike on March 18 for 24 symbolic hours, though the McGill boycott went largely unobserved and further action was rejected by the student body through an online poll. This constituted the first strike since 1967 for the HEC and the first strike in 40 years for Polytechnique.

== Agreement ==
On April 2, the student federations and the government reached an agreement that was still left to be voted on by the individual student associations during the week. This agreement consists of a CAN $70M refunding for 2005–2006 and a return of the $103M for the next 4 years, totaling $482M. This money comes from 3 levels: the millennium grant foundation, the federal government and the provincial government.

The FEUQ officially endorsed the agreement, while the FECQ maintained a neutral position, saying it was "interesting enough" to be voted on by the individual members' unions. The CASSÉÉ rejected it. Over the next week, the movement mostly ended, with over two thirds of the students voting for a return to class during the week. However, at least 20 unions representing over 100,000 students rejected the offer and by April 11, there were still approximately 20,000 students boycotting class. During the following 2 weeks, most associations ended or suspended the boycott to allow the students to complete their semester.

== Symbol ==
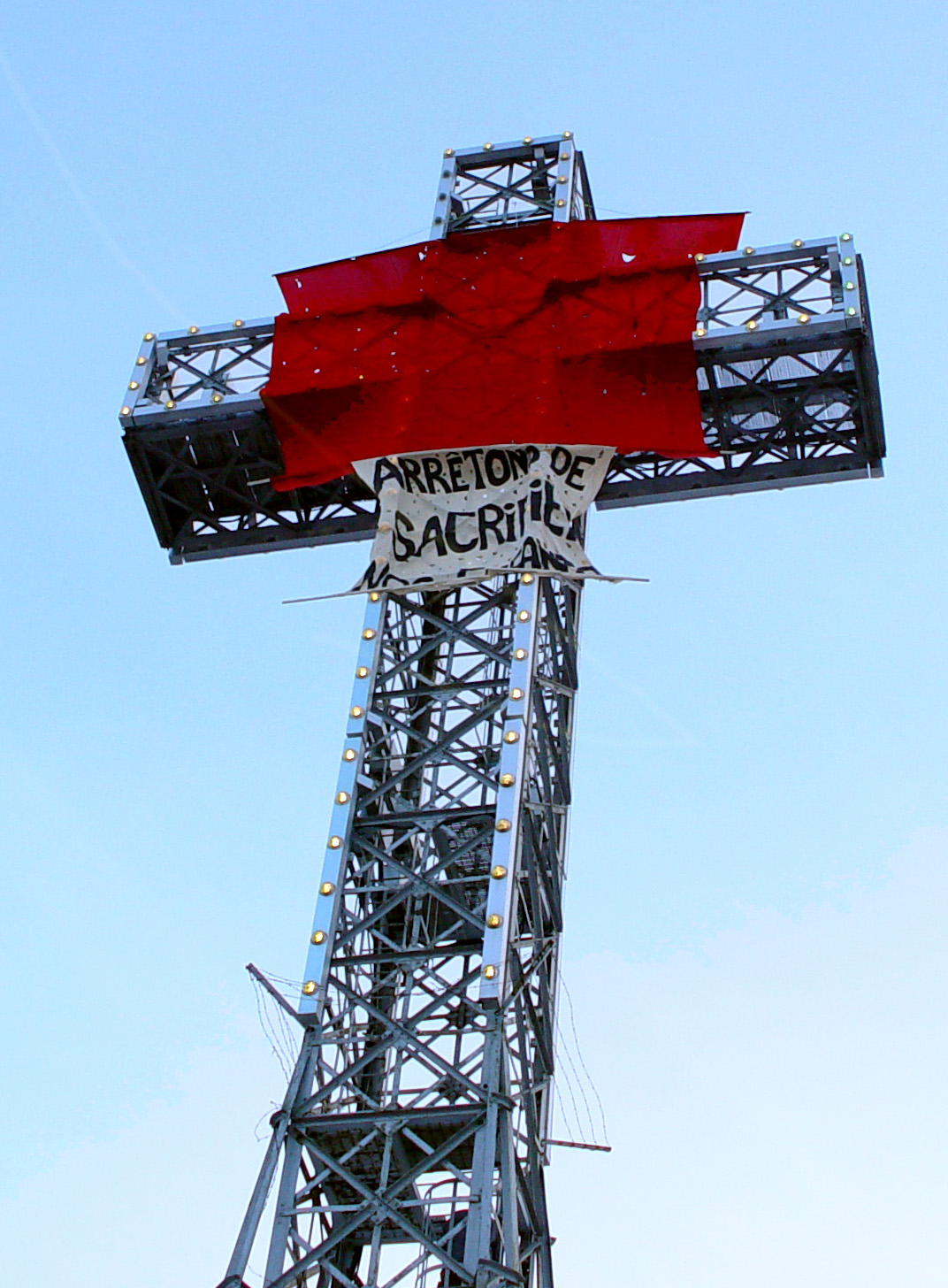
On March 30, a group of students hoisted the students' symbol on Mount Royal cross.

The symbol of support for the student strike was a small square of red cloth worn upon clothing as a kind of ribbon. The Parti Québécois MNAs, then in opposition, wore the red square to demonstrate their support for the striking students.

On March 30, a group of students hoisted the symbol opposed to student poverty on Mount Royal Cross. It took a full day before authorities were able to remove it. On its lower panel, it was written: "Arrêtons de sacrifier nos enfants", which means: "Let's stop sacrificing our children."

== See also ==
- 1996 Quebec student protests
- 2012 Quebec student protests
- Students' union
- Student protest
- 2012 Quebec general election
