= Caroline De Guire =

Caroline De Guire MNA

Member of the National Assembly for Laval-des-Rapides
- Incumbent
- Assumed office October 5, 2026
- Preceded by: Céline Haytayan

Personal details
- Party: Liberal

Caroline De Guire is a Canadian politician who is a candidate for the National Assembly of Quebec for Laval-des-Rapides in the 2026 Quebec general election as a member of the Quebec Liberal Party.
