= Laval-des-Rapides (provincial electoral district) =

Provincial electoral district in Quebec, Canada

Quebec electoral district
- Location in Laval
- Coordinates: 45.575°N 73.704°W

Provincial electoral district
- Legislature: National Assembly of Quebec
MNA
Caroline De Guire
Liberal
- District created: 1980
- First contested: 1981
- Last contested: 2026

Demographics
- Population (2011): 72,440
- Electors (2014): 54,691
- Area (km²): 25.6
- Pop. density (per km²): 2,829.7
- Census division: Laval (part)
- Census subdivision: Laval (part)

Laval-des-Rapides (French pronunciation: [laval de ʁapid]) is a provincial electoral district in the Laval region of Quebec, Canada, that elects members to the National Assembly of Quebec. It is located between Autoroute 15 and Autoroute 19 and between Rivière des Prairies and Autoroute 440.

It was created for the 1981 election from parts of Fabre and Mille-Îles electoral districts.

In the change from the 2001 to the 2011 electoral map, it gained a small amount of territory from Mille-Îles.

In 2026, it lost all of its Duvernay territory in the east to Mille-Îles, while it gained the Centrpolois area from Chomedey.

From when the riding was created in 1981 until 2014, the riding had always voted for the winning party in every general election.

== Members of the National Assembly ==
Legislature	Years	Member	Party
Riding created from Fabre and Mille-Îles
32nd	1981–1985	Bernard Landry	Parti Québécois
33rd	1985–1989	Guy Bélanger	Liberal
34th	1989–1993	Guy Bélanger	Liberal
34th	1993–1994	Serge Ménard	Parti Québécois
35th	1994–1998	Serge Ménard	Parti Québécois
36th	1998–2003	Serge Ménard	Parti Québécois
37th	2003–2007	Alain Paquet	Liberal
38th	2007–2008	Alain Paquet	Liberal
39th	2008–2012	Alain Paquet	Liberal
40th	2012–2014	Léo Bureau-Blouin	Parti Québécois
41st	2014–2018	Saul Polo	Liberal
42nd	2018–2022	Saul Polo	Liberal
43rd	2022–2026	Céline Haytayan	Coalition Avenir Québec
44th	2026–Present	Caroline De Guire	Liberal

== Election results ==
2026 Quebec general election
** Preliminary results — Not yet official **
Party	Candidate	Votes	%	±%
Liberal	Caroline De Guire	12,034	36.38	+7.72
Parti Québécois	Fatima Aboubakr	7,506	22.69	+10.04
Québec solidaire	Sabrina Di Matteo	5,339	16.14	+0.03
Conservative	Ronny Niro	3,888	11.76	+2.87
Coalition Avenir Québec	Vincent Bolduc	3,875	11.72	–20.76
Green	Patrick Truong	352	1.06	–0.16
Parti accès propriété et équité	Shawn Lalande McLean	81	0.24	N/A
Total valid votes		33,075	98.28	–0.24
Total rejected ballots		578	1.72	+0.24
Turnout		33,653	59.30	–2.18
Electors on the lists		56,746		
Liberal notional gain from Coalition Avenir Québec		Swing		–1.16
Source: Élections Québec

2022 Quebec general election redistributed results
Party	Vote	%
Coalition Avenir Québec	10,594	32.48
Liberal	9,348	28.66
Québec solidaire	5,254	16.11
Parti Québécois	4,128	12.65
Conservative	2,901	8.89
Others	397	1.22

2022 Quebec general election
Party	Candidate	Votes	%	±%
Coalition Avenir Québec	Céline Haytayan	10,599	31.90	+1.16
Liberal	Saul Polo	9,546	28.73	-2.81
Québec solidaire	Josée Chevalier	5,542	16.68	-0.28
Parti Québécois	Andréanne Fiola	4,293	12.92	-2.48
Conservative	Nicolas Lussier-Clément	2,852	8.58	+7.51
Green	Zied Damergi	398	1.20	-0.99
Total valid votes		33,230	98.52	
Total rejected ballots		500	1.48	-0.30
Turnout		33,730	61.48	-0.20
Electors on the lists		54,861		
Coalition Avenir Québec gain from Liberal		Swing		+1.99

2018 Quebec general election
Party	Candidate	Votes	%	±%
Liberal	Saul Polo	10,637	31.54	-12.67
Coalition Avenir Québec	Christine Mitton	10,366	30.73	+13.58
Québec solidaire	Graciela Mateo	5,721	16.96	+11.33
Parti Québécois	Jocelyn Caron	5,195	15.40	-15.76
Green	Estelle Obeo	738	2.19	+0.84
Conservative	Benoit Larocque	361	1.07	
Citoyens au pouvoir	Bianca Bozsodi	271	0.80	
New Democratic	Jean Phariste Pharicien	257	0.76	
Parti libre	Elias Progakis	184	0.55	
Total valid votes		33,730	98.22	
Total rejected ballots		611	1.78	+0.25
Turnout		34,341	61.68	-9.23
Eligible voters		55,678		
Liberal hold		Swing		-13.12
Source(s) "Rapport des résultats officiels du scrutin". Élections Québec.

2014 Quebec general election
Party	Candidate	Votes	%	±%
Liberal	Saul Polo	16,880	44.20	+11.93
Parti Québécois	Léo Bureau-Blouin	11,902	31.17	-7.16
Coalition Avenir Québec	Vincent Bolduc	6,552	17.16	-4.64
Québec solidaire	Nicolas Chatel-Launay	2,151	5.63	+1.41
Green	Léo McKenna	516	1.35	+0.02
Option nationale	David Voyer	188	0.49	-1.04
Total valid votes		38,189	98.47	–
Total rejected ballots		593	1.53	–
Turnout		38,782	70.91	-2.45
Electors on the lists		54,691	–	–

2012 Quebec general election
Party	Candidate	Votes	%	±%
Parti Québécois	Léo Bureau-Blouin	14,934	38.33	-0.62
Liberal	Alain Paquet	12,572	32.27	-11.80
Coalition Avenir Québec	Maud Cohen	8,493	21.80	+11.60*
Québec solidaire	Sylvie Des Rochers	1,643	4.22	+1.35
Option nationale	Lawrence Côté-Collins	594	1.53	–
Green	Carl Desmarais	517	1.33	-1.23
Coalition pour la constituante	Monique Chartrand	205	0.53	–
Total valid votes		38,958	98.75	–
Total rejected ballots		492	1.25	–
Turnout		39,450	73.36	+18.25
Electors on the lists		53,773	–	–

* Result compared to Action démocratique

2008 Quebec general election
Party	Candidate	Votes	%	±%
Liberal	Alain Paquet	11,757	44.07	+9.66
Parti Québécois	Marc Demers	10,392	38.95	+8.99
Action démocratique	Robert Goulet	2,722	10.20	-17.69
Québec solidaire	Sylvie Des Rochers	766	2.87	-0.55
Green	Nicholas Sarrazin	683	2.56	-1.77
Parti indépendantiste	Mathieu Desbiens	150	0.56	–
Independent	Jacques Frigon	112	0.42	–
Marxist–Leninist	Yvon Breton	96	0.36	–
Total valid votes		26,678	98.59	–
Total rejected ballots		382	1.41	–
Turnout		27,060	55.11	-14.56
Electors on the lists		49,100	–	–

2007 Quebec general election
Party	Candidate	Votes	%	±%
Liberal	Alain Paquet	11,532	34.41	-10.32
Parti Québécois	Marc Demers	10,038	29.96	-8.94
Action démocratique	Robert Goulet	9,344	27.89	+14.07
Green	Michel Lefebvre	1,450	4.33	+3.25
Québec solidaire	Nicole Caron	1,145	3.42	–
Total valid votes		33,509	98.83	–
Total rejected ballots		396	1.17	–
Turnout		33,905	69.67	-0.15
Electors on the lists		48,667	–	–

2003 Quebec general election
Party	Candidate	Votes	%	±%
Liberal	Alain Paquet	15,190	44.73	+3.95
Parti Québécois	Serge Ménard	13,209	38.90	-6.59
Action démocratique	Philippe Laurin	4,693	13.82	+1.51
Green	Louis-Philippe Verenka	366	1.08	–
Bloc Pot	Vincent Pelletier	339	1.00	+0.73
Christian Democracy	Micheline Michelle Marleau	162	0.48	–
Total valid votes		33,959	98.74	–
Total rejected ballots		434	1.26	–
Turnout		34,393	69.82	-9.83
Electors on the lists		49,259	–	–

1998 Quebec general election
Party	Candidate	Votes	%	±%
Parti Québécois	Serge Ménard	13,938	45.49	-1.36
Liberal	Robert Lefebvre	12,497	40.78	-0.34
Action démocratique	Pierre Cadieu	3,771	12.31	+3.26
Bloc Pot	Marie-Ève Samson	223	0.73	–
Socialist Democracy	Nathalie Toussaint	117	0.38	-1.83
Innovator	Réal Lalonde	97	0.32	–
Total valid votes		30,643	98.94	–
Total rejected ballots		327	1.06	–
Turnout		30,970	78.85	-3.83
Electors on the lists		39,279	–	–

1995 Quebec referendum
Side	Votes	%
Oui	19,057	52.65
Non	17,142	47.35

1994 Quebec general election
Party	Candidate	Votes	%	±%
Parti Québécois	Serge Ménard	14,179	46.85	-7.46
Liberal	Raymond Monette	12,446	41.12	-1.05
Action démocratique	Claude Théberge	2,738	9.05	–
New Democratic	Richard Aubert	669	2.21	+1.59
Natural Law	Claude Viau	232	0.77	–
Total valid votes		30,264	97.74	–
Total rejected ballots		700	2.26	–
Turnout		30,964	82.68	+43.78
Electors on the lists		37,451	–	–

Quebec provincial by-election, December 13, 1993
Party	Candidate	Votes	%	±%
Parti Québécois	Serge Ménard	7,551	54.31	+10.57
Liberal	Raymond Monette	5,831	42.17	-9.47
Parti j'en peut pus	Robert Leclerc	197	1.42	–
Parti Réforme Québec	André Dovon	178	1.29	–
New Democratic	Robert Giguère	86	0.62	–
Renaissance	Michel Le Brun	26	0.19	–
Total valid votes		13,829	98.86	–
Total rejected ballots		160	1.14	–
Turnout		13,989	38.90	-36.82
Electors on the lists		35,961	–	–

1992 Charlottetown Accord referendum
Side	Votes	%
Non	18,887	59.31
Oui	12,960	40.69

1989 Quebec general election
Party	Candidate	Votes	%	±%
Liberal	Guy Bélanger	14,821	51.52	-0.96
Parti Québécois	François Shanks	12,622	43.87	-0.54
Independent	Patrice Fortin	972	3.38	–
United Social Credit	Emilien Martel	354	1.23	+0.81
Total valid votes		28,769	97.12	–
Total rejected ballots		853	2.88	–
Turnout		29,622	75.72	-0.49
Electors on the lists		39,118	–	–

== See also ==
- List of Quebec provincial electoral districts
- Canadian provincial electoral districts
