= 2012 Quebec student protests =

2012 protests for free education in Quebec, Canada

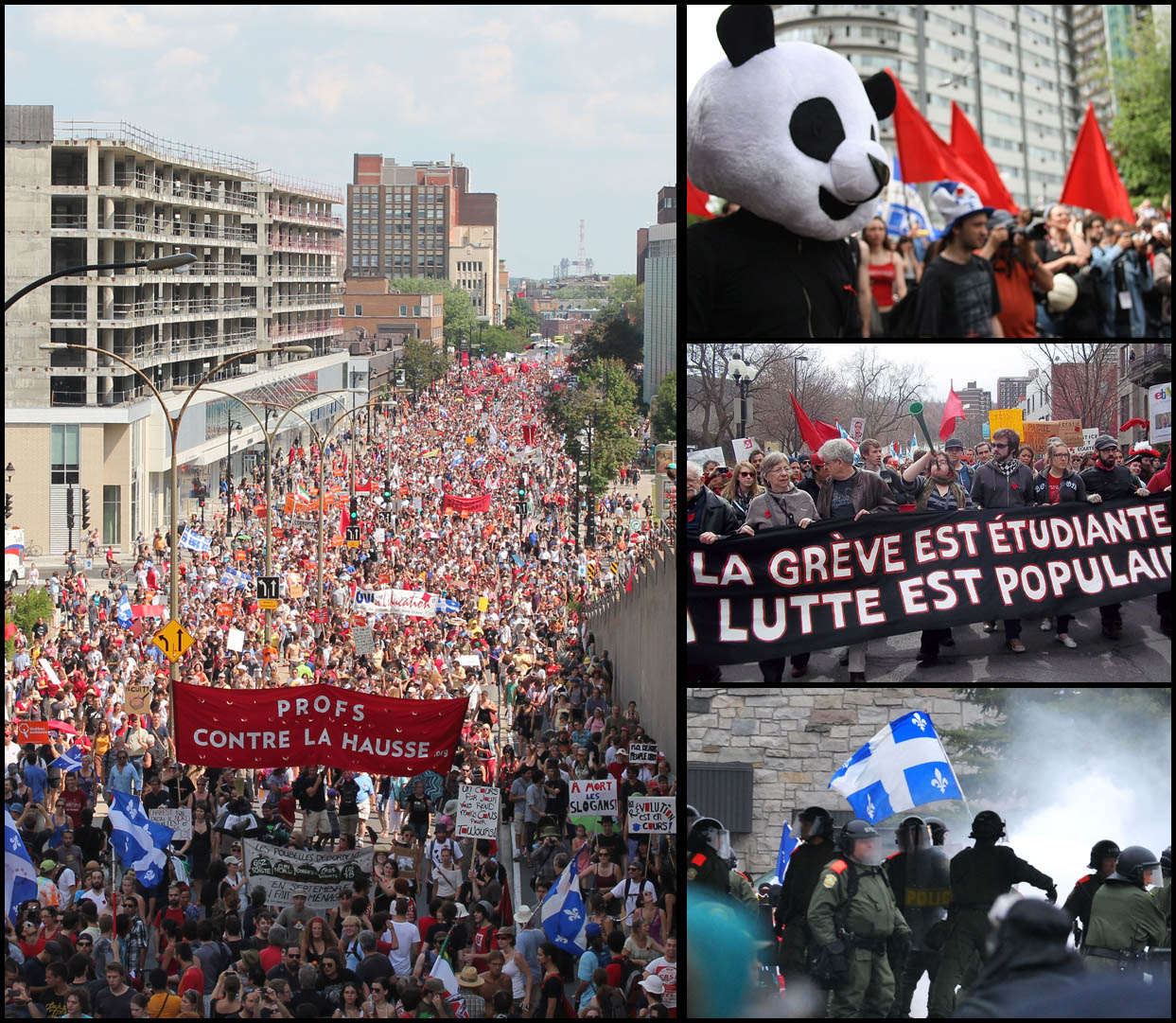
- July 22 (left), May 22 (up) and April 15 (centre) demonstrations and Victoriaville riots (down).
- Date: February 13, 2012 – September 7, 2012
- Location: Quebec, Canada
- Goals: Tuition freeze and free education
- Methods: Demonstrations; Occupations; Civil disobedience; Picketing; Graffitis; Flash mobs; Barricades; Riots; Vandalism; Online activism

Lead figures
Jean Charest, Premier of Quebec; Line Beauchamp, Minister of Education (until May 14, 2012); Michelle Courchesne, Minister of Education (May 14-September 4)	Gabriel Nadeau-Dubois of the CLASSE; Martine Desjardins of the FEUQ; Léo Bureau-Blouin of the FECQ; Pauline Marois, leader of opposition party Parti Québécois

Casualties
- Injuries: 41+
- Arrested: 3,509

The 2012 Quebec student protests (movement) were a series of student protests led by students individually such as the Association pour une solidarité syndicale étudiante (ASSÉ), the Fédération étudiante universitaire du Québec, and the Fédération étudiante collégiale du Québec against a proposal by the Quebec Cabinet, headed by Liberal Premier Jean Charest, to raise university tuition from $2,168 to $3,793 between 2012 and 2018. As part of the protest movement, a series of widespread student strikes were organized, involving half of Quebec's student population by April 2012. A third of Québécois students continued to participate in the strike by its 100th day, while a quarter million had participated during its peak. Other students continued to attend their courses.

Left-wing and sovereignist groups endorsed the student protests, which evolved into generalized demonstrations against the provincial government. Opposition parties (Parti Québécois, Québec solidaire, Option nationale), workers unions (Confédération des syndicats nationaux, Canadian Union of Public Employees) and many groups demonstrated alongside the students in April and May 2012.

On May 18, the Government passed Bill 78, an emergency law forbidding picketing or protest near university grounds, and requiring police approval for large public protests anywhere in Quebec. The law was mainly repealed by the Marois government in September 2012 and expired in 2013.

In the Fall of 2012, the Parti Québécois was elected as minority government and halted any tuition increases in line with its campaign promises and, with a new school term beginning, student participation in the strikes and demonstrations dwindled.

These protests are sometimes named Maple Spring (French: Printemps érable), alluding to the Arab Spring as well as the maple leaf that symbolizes Quebec and Canada.

== Historical context ==
=== Higher education in Quebec ===
In the 1960s, the provincial government took over responsibility for higher education. Changes included the creation of a separate pre-university college level, a publicly funded college system, and providing universities enough funding so that it would be affordable to anyone who wanted to attend. These changes in education access gave birth to a Quebec middle class and transformed the possibility of upward mobility in the province.

As a result of the Quiet Revolution, university tuition fees in Quebec were frozen at C$540 per year from 1968 to 1990. In 1994, annual tuition rose to C$1668, after which it was frozen until 2007, when it grew by C$100 per year until 2012, making it C$2168. Overall, tuition increased an average of C$37 per year or 300% between 1968 and 2012, not including other fees that are paid to universities (e.g. administration fees, student service fees, etc.). The overall cost living inflation (as measured by an aggregate inflation index commonly used by Canadian economists) rose 557% from 1968 to 2012, meaning that C$540 in 1968 was roughly equivalent to about C$3,545 in 2012. At the time, Quebec maintained the lowest tuition fees in Canada.

=== Student protests in Quebec ===
The province's student associations have a mandatory membership and dues structure. These associations depend on the size and level of the institution.

In smaller colleges and universities, strikes will be campus wide, but at larger schools they usually happen by department so the entire campus is rarely shut down. For example, if engineering students voted to strike, the picket lines would focus only on engineering students.

Student associations usually call for strikes over local issues and set a limited time period. The student strike movement persists in Quebec because it is one of the only places where student associations hold regular general assemblies.

Most student strikes in Quebec won at least a partial victory. These previous student strikes demanded free tuition, democratic administration of the universities, the expansion of French instruction and facilities, elimination of more stringent aptitude tests, and an increase in bursaries.

== Events ==
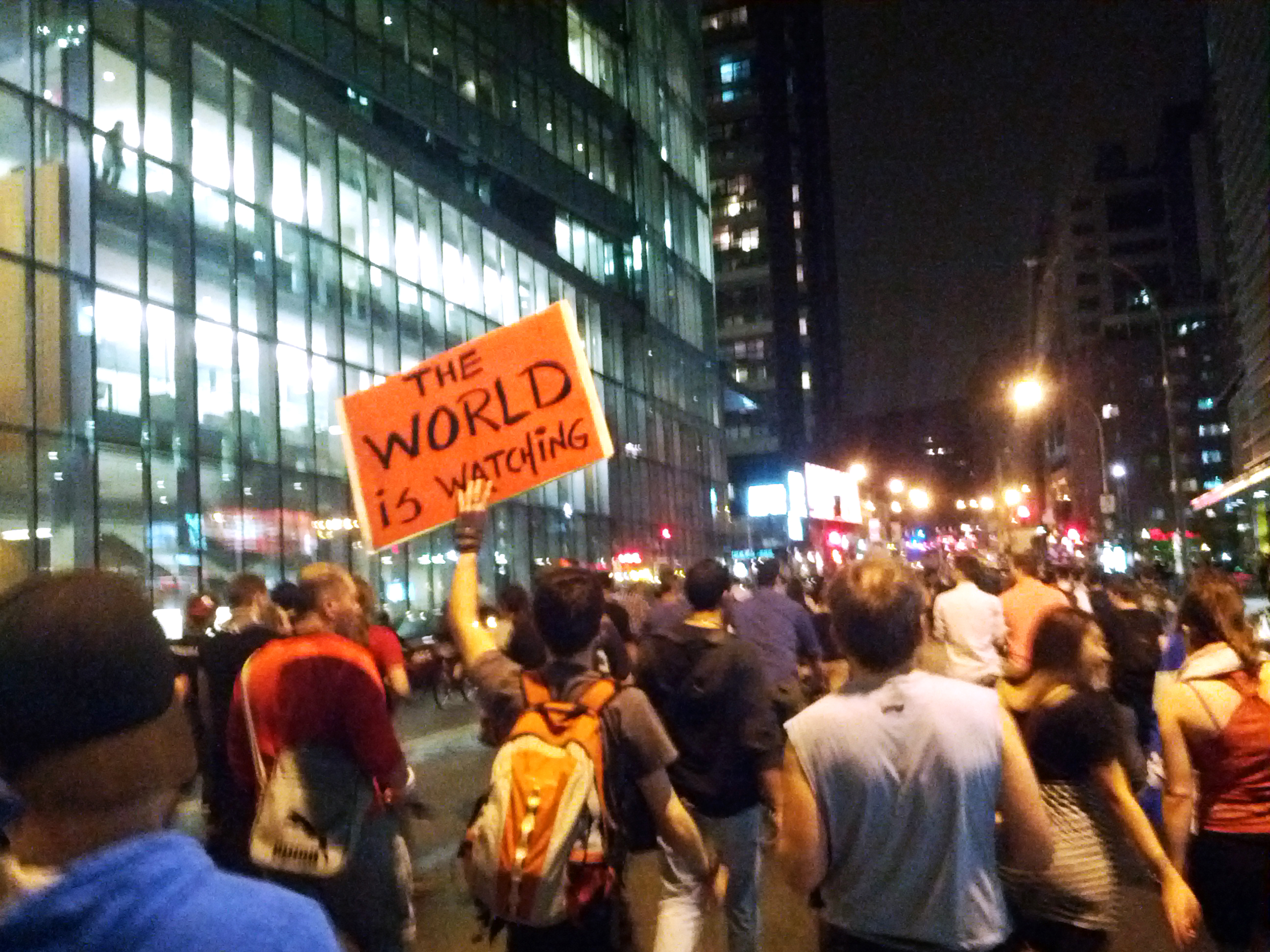
One of the many night protests in the streets of Montreal, 27 May 2012.

=== March 2011 ===
In March 2011, Quebec decided to pursue planned five year tuition increases, prompting protests from student groups, and the occupation of the office of the Finance minister.

=== Summer 2011 ===
In July, student leaders accused police of brutality and repression against protesters, whose numbers swelled to 30,000 by November, leading to the occupation of McGill University's administrative building.

=== December 2011 ===
CLASSE (Coalition large de l'Association pour une solidarité syndicale étudiante, or “broad coalition of the Association for Student Union Solidarity”) was founded, and announced the intention to strike. A few weeks later, the Fédération étudiante collégiale du Québec (FECQ) and the Fédération étudiante universitaire du Québec (FEUQ) stated they would also strike.

=== February 2012 ===
The strike officially began on February 13, 2012, with students at Université du Québec à Montréal (UQAM) and University Laval voting massively in opposition to the increase of university tuition fees. Beginning late February 2012, nine per cent of Quebec students, or 36,000 students, went on strike, using a square red flag for protest.

On February 23, students were pepper-sprayed by police after occupying Montreal's Jaques Cartier bridge.

=== March 2012 ===
On March 7, 2012, during a sit-in demonstration blocking front of the Loto-Québec (lottery) head office, police deployed tear gas and flash-bang grenades against over 1,000 protesters. One student named Francis Grenier had his eye seriously wounded by what he and other demonstrators stated was a flash-bang grenade launched by police. According to the student's father, police investigators sought to demonstrate the wound was caused by a snowball. Students begin to wear patches over their left eyes in solidarity with Grenier.

During the morning rush hour on March 20, 150 student demonstrators blocked the Montreal-bound entrance ramp to the Champlain Bridge in Brossard using concrete blocks. Upon the arrival of Sûreté du Québec police officers, the protesters fled through the streets of Brossard to coaches waiting for them at Terminus Panama. When officers arrived at the Terminus, they surrounded the buses and arrested around 100 demonstrators. Each was identified and fined C$494.

On March 22, an estimated 200,000 people came together for a massive peaceful protest in downtown Montreal. At its peak, the parade stretched up to 50 blocks. While there was no violence, the police confiscated sticks carried by some participants. By this time, over 310 000 students (out of 400 000 in the province) were on strike.

On March 27, protesters block access to the Quebec Liquor Board offices as students begin to target economic symbols.

=== April 2012 ===
On April 2, the outside of Line Beauchamp's office is painted red. This building becomes a popular rallying point at marches.

On April 18–19, more than 300 people are arrested in Gatineau, Quebec during confrontations between the police and protesters at Universite du Quebec's Outaouais campus.

=== May 2012 ===
In April and early May, 185,000 Quebec students went on strike, with an additional 90,000 students threatening to strike. Quebec education minister Line Beauchamp called on students to negotiate while refusing to negotiate with CLASSE, which she accused of instigating violence. Students demanded that university administrative costs be reduced by $189 million, to pay for teaching and research.

On May 5, after a marathon negotiating session, student groups and government reach deal to delay increases in cost of education for a few months pending a study by a new body. Student assemblies massively reject the offer, while some student faculties vote to end walkout and return to school.

On May 6, 2012, a demonstration took place in Victoriaville, which eventually turned into a riot when vandals started throwing projectiles at the crowd. At least ten people were injured, including some police officers who were attacked by protesters. Two protesters were very seriously injured. The first one lost an eye. The second one sustained head trauma and a skull fracture.

On May 14, 2012 Line Beauchamp announced that she would resign from her position as Quebec Education Minister and Deputy Premier. Beauchamp stated that she "lost confidence in the student leaders' will to end this conflict." Later that same day, Premier Charest announced that Michelle Courchesne would replace Beauchamp as Education Minister and Deputy Premier.

On May 18, 2012, Bill 78 passed in the National Assembly of Quebec during the early hours of the morning and the municipality of Montreal passed a law prohibiting mask-wearing during any organization or demonstration. The nightly protest being held in downtown Montreal ended in violence and 69 arrests. There were reports of projectiles being launched by protesters, as well as molotov cocktails, and police responded by firing rubber bullets and using tear gas and noise bombs against the protesters. Police declared the protest to be illegal.

On May 19, 2012, Montreal-based band Arcade Fire wore the "red square" solidarity symbol during a performance with Mick Jagger on the season finale of Saturday Night Live.

On May 20, 2012, during an evening protest that turned violent, a protester was seriously injured by police officers in riot gear. Upon attacking an officer, the victim was beaten by five officers with their clubs and forcibly neutralized.

On May 22, 2012, in response to the passage of Bill 78 and in commemoration of 100 days since the beginning of the student strike, another march took place, with tens of thousands of marchers and approximately 1,000 arrests Organizers spun this event as "The single biggest act of civil disobedience in Canadian history."

By May 24, 2012, the "Casseroles" series of nightly protests had rapidly expanded to most Montreal residential neighbourhoods outside of the usual protest routes. These protests, in which people stood on their own balconies banging pots and pans, emerged as a way of subverting the ban on unannounced street protests. Inspired by the cacerolazos of Chile in 1971, these involved residents banging on pots and pans from their windows or taking to the streets with their kitchenware at 8 o'clock. A viral amateur video of one such protest in the Plateau Mont-Royal neighbourhood further fuelled this phenomenon.

On May 31, the Quebec government stated that it was pulling out of talks meant to end the protest after four days of negotiations with student leaders, without having reached a stable consensus. By that day, more than 150,000 students were estimated to be on strike.

=== June 2012 ===
Strikes continued as thousands more joined the movement to directly protest Bill 78. Since this bill affected all Quebec citizens, groups including trade unions, teachers and professor unions, the Quebec Bar Association, jurists, and hundreds of others joined the protests. Police were then arresting dozens of people each night. During the Canadian Grand Prix weekend (June 9–10, 2012), Montreal police carried out mass preventative arrests.

=== September 2012 ===
Bill 78 was repealed after the election of the Parti Québécois to government in September 2012. After the announcement by ministerial decree of tuition freeze on September 5, 2012, the remaining student associations on strike voted to return to class.

== Bill 78 ==
On May 16, soon after the appointment of Michelle Courchesne, she and Premier Charest announced their plan to introduce Bill 78. The bill was titled "An Act to enable students to receive instruction from the postsecondary institutions they attend," and restricted freedom of assembly, protest, or picketing on or near university grounds, and anywhere in Quebec without prior police approval. The bill also placed restrictions upon the right of education employees to strike. After 20 hours of debate, the National Assembly passed Bill 78 on May 18, 2012.

This bill was criticized by the United Nations, with the UN High Commissioner stating that: "In the context of student protests, I am disappointed by the new legislation passed in Quebec that restricts their rights to freedom of association and of peaceful assembly". The bill was also denounced by opposition parties.

== Symbols ==
=== Red square ===
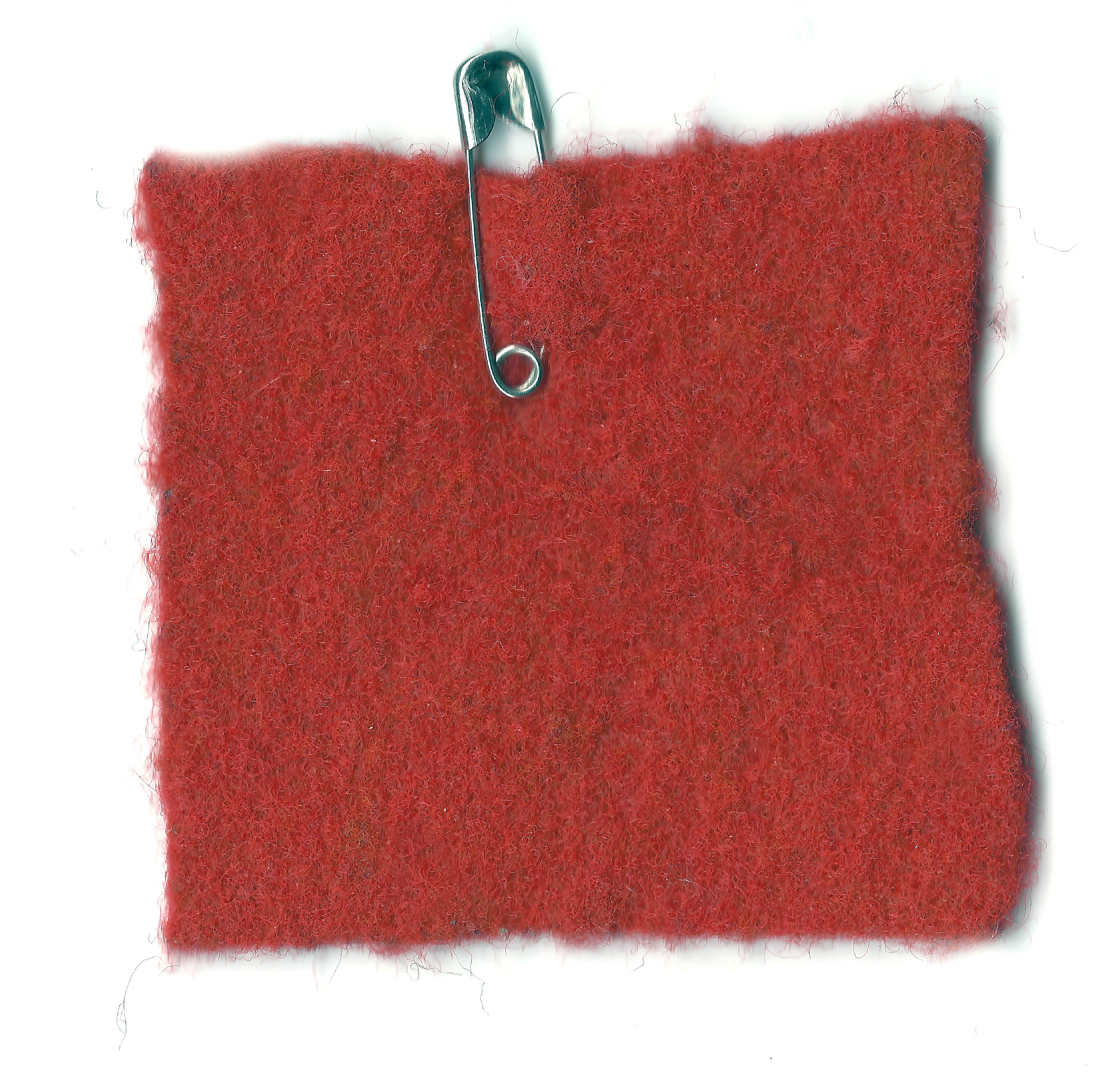
The red square, symbol of the Quebec student protest against tuition fee increases.

The red square is a symbol of the protest against the raise in university fees. It is the primary symbol that was used in the student protests of 2005 and 2012. The square first appeared in October 2004 when the Collectif pour un Québec sans pauvreté (Collective for a Quebec without Poverty) used it in a campaign against Bill 57. Throughout the 2012 student protest, red squares made of felt, worn by students opposed to tuition increases and their supporters, can also be seen on many monuments, and in the windows of educational institutions, businesses and residences. A giant red square was briefly suspended from the Jacques-Cartier Bridge and the Mount Royal Cross by students from the Université de Montréal during a protest.

=== Other squares ===
After the red square became a well-known symbol in Quebec, other groups decided to use squares of varying colours to promote their own viewpoints.

- The blue square is worn by people who are opposed to the tuition fee increases and opposed to the student strikes.
- The green square is worn by those in favour of raising tuition fees.
- The yellow square, recommended by commentator Richard Martineau but not widely adopted, would be worn by those who support delaying the tuition increases over a greater period of time.
- The black square is worn by people who oppose Bill 78 and/or generally oppose police brutality and civil rights abuses.
- The white square is worn by parents of students in the protest who would like the students and the government to reach an agreement and/or to show opposition to any form of violence.

== Controversies ==
On April 18, 2012, a group of 300 protesters broke windows, ransacked rooms and injured a security guard at the Université de Montréal. Six protestors, including the daughter of Quebec solidaire's Amir Khadir, were sued by the university for C$100,000 in damages. The students were later sentenced to probation and community service.

On May 23, 2012, at around 23h45, about 500 civilians suspected to be protesters were arrested by the Service de police de la Ville de Montréal at the intersections of Sherbrooke Street and Saint-Denis in Montréal. They were not informed as to why they were arrested, with police claiming the protest had been declared illegal, but the victims argued that at no occasion had they been informed that the protest was illegal or that they could disperse. The 500 suspected protesters were detained inside buses for 3 to 8 hours. Documents used in court against the city describe people suffering hypothermia and hypoglycemia and being barred from using bathrooms for up to 8 hours. The police would ask people to urinate at the back of the buses because they said the number of officers was insufficient to safely bring everyone to the bathroom one by one. In the end, no one in those buses would receive any tickets or charges.

On June 12, 2012, some protesters were referring to local police authorities as SS and anti-police pamphlets using the swastika were distributed. The use of the Nazi symbolism was quickly decried in the Montreal Gazette by several Jewish organizations. Although it is said that protesters were using these symbols to condemn the recent tactics use by the local police, the CLASSE has implored its members to stop using these symbols.

== Legacy ==
The protests inspired directors Mathieu Denis and Simon Lavoie to make the 2016 film Those Who Make Revolution Halfway Only Dig Their Own Graves. Denis and Lavoie said they often wondered what happened to these students in later years. Lavoie was particularly influenced by mug shots of four young people who placed smoke bombs on the Montreal Metro during the protests.

The protests also served partial inspiration for the play When There's Nothing Left to Burn by Montreal-born playwright Sean Devine.

The protests were profiled in Rodrigue Jean and Arnaud Valade's 2022 documentary film 2012/Through the Heart (2012/Dans le cœur).

In 2023, the city of Montreal settled multiple class-action lawsuits alleging that the city's police response to different protests between June 2012 and March 2015 violated protestors' right to freedom of expression and security, paying CA$6,000,000 and formally apologizing.

== See also ==
- 1996 Quebec student protests
- 2005 Quebec student protests
- Anarchopanda
- Students' union
- Student protest
- Bill 78
- List of incidents of civil unrest in Canada
- List of protests in the 21st century
