= Collège Regina Assumpta =

Location
- 1750, rue Sauriol Est; Montreal, Quebec, H2C 1X4; Canada; 45°33′57″N 73°39′03″W

Information
- School type: Private, Day school
- Motto: Connais – Rayonne – Aime (Know – Shine – Love)
- Established: 1955
- Founder: Sisters of Notre-Dame Congregation
- Principal: Julie Duchesne
- Grades: Secondary 1–5
- Gender: Coeducational (since 1996)
- Enrollment: about 2340 students
- Language: French, English second language and Spanish for students in Secondary 3 and 4
- Campus type: Urban
- Colours: Blue and Gold
- Athletics conference: RSEQ
- Team name: Robotics - Team3990; Sports - Les Panthères
- Newspaper: Votre JE
- Affiliations: UNESCO ASPNet Fédération des établissements d'enseignement privés (FEEP)
- Public transit access: Sauvé station, bus 121; Henri-Bourassa station, bus 69; Papineau station, bus 45
- Website: www.reginaassumpta.qc.ca

Collège Regina Assumpta (Regina Assumpta is Latin for "Assumption of the Queen") is a subsidized private, selective French-language school located in Montreal, Quebec, Canada, that was established in 1955 by the Sisters of Notre-Dame Congregation. The principal is Julie Duchesne. Although it used to be a school for Catholic girls, it is now open to children of all genders and of any religion.

Member of the Federation of Private Educational Establishments of Quebec (FEEP), it ranks among the best secondary schools in the “Bulletin of Secondary Schools of Quebec”, according to the annual ranking of the Fraser Institute.

== Athletics ==
The school is a member of the Quebec Student Sports Federation and it competes with many other private and public schools throughout Quebec. Sports offered at Collège Regina Assumpta include:

- Badminton
- Basketball
- Cheerleading
- Flag football
- Football
- Golf
- Swimming
- Volleyball
- Fencing
- Track and field (both indoor and outdoor)
- Ice hockey
- Soccer (only indoor)

== Robotics ==
A fundamental part of the school is the Robotics Team. In fact, the robotics team offered in Regina is one of, if not the best robotics program offered in any Canadian High School. The school offers a basic program to students from Secondary 1 to 3 but also has a FIRST Robotics Team that any robotics student can join as an extracurricular. Their FRC team is Team 3990 [T4K]. Their team has won many championships and regional and has been in the league since 2012.

== Notable alumni ==
- Julie Payette, astronaut for the Canadian Space Agency and 29th Governor General of Canada
- Louise Lecavalier, Canadian dancer and choreographer
- Louise Arbour, Canadian lawyer, prosecutor, jurist, UN Special Representative for International Migration and 31st Governor General of Canada
- Gabriel Nadeau-Dubois, former co-spokesperson of Québec Solidaire, member of the National Assembly of Quebec representing Gouin and writer
- Mélanie Joly, Canadian lawyer, Minister of Foreign Affairs and Liberal member of the House of Commons of Canada representing Ahuntsic-Cartierville
