= Bill 78 =

Act of the National Assembly of Quebec

National Assembly of Quebec
- Citation: S.Q. 2012, c. 12
- Passed by: National Assembly of Quebec
- Passed: 18 May 2012
- Royal assent: 18 May 2012
- Commenced: 18 May 2012
- Date of expiry: 1 July 2013

Legislative history
- Bill citation: Bill 78
- Introduced by: Michelle Courchesne, Minister of Education, Recreation and Sports
- Introduced: 18 May 2012
- First reading: 18 May 2012
- Second reading: 18 May 2012
- Third reading: 18 May 2012
- Status: Expired

Bill 78, officially titled An Act to enable students to receive instruction from the postsecondary institutions they attend (French: Loi permettant aux étudiants de recevoir l'enseignement dispensé par les établissements de niveau postsecondaire qu'ils fréquentent), led to an emergency law passed on 18 May 2012 by the National Assembly of Quebec. The law was passed in response to a student strike opposing tuition increases, associated with large student protests, and states that its purpose is to ensure that no student be denied the right to receive education at the school they attend, and that no one may impede the school's ability to provide it. The law restricts protest or picketing on or near university grounds. The law further requires that organizers of a protest, consisting of 50 or more people in a public venue anywhere in Quebec, submit their proposed venue and/or route to the relevant police for approval. Bill 78 was drafted by members of the Quebec Liberal Party, introduced by Education Minister Michelle Courchesne, and passed with the support of the Coalition Avenir Québec party. The planned tuition increases were subsequently repealed in September 2012, by a decree from Pauline Marois's newly elected Parti Québécois government.

== Background ==
=== Early events in the protest ===
In March 2011, Jean Charest's Quebec Liberal Party announced plans in their 2011–2012 budget to increase Quebec university fees by $325 per year over five years (or $1,625), an increase of 75% over current rates. In April 2012, the government proposed a solution that would have seen tuition rise $254 per year over 7 years, including an inflation index after the first two years (or $1,779), an increase of 82% over current rates.

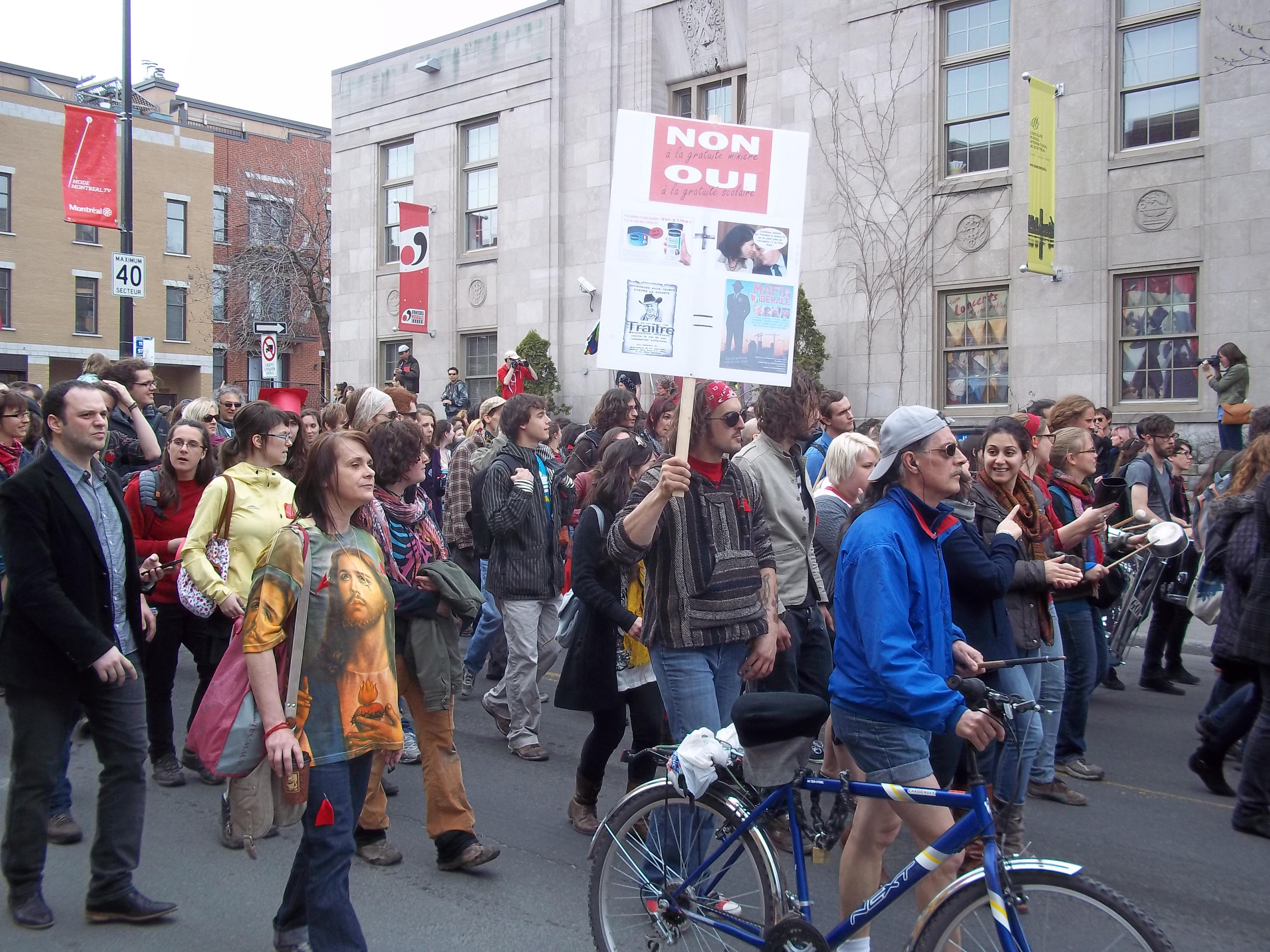
Student protests in Montreal against the government's planned tuition increases, 14 April 2012

Beginning 13 February 2012, students associated with one of Quebec's student unions walked out of their classes to protest the proposed tuition increases and, by mid March, 250,000 people had joined. Protesting students from colleges and universities held a vote, demanding that the government rescind the planned fee increases and place a freeze on fees before returning to class.

Clashes between student protesters and police began soon after the demonstrations began. Between 13 February and 15 May, groups of protesters, varying in population from hundreds to thousands, on multiple occasions blocked or attempted to block both the Jacques Cartier and Champlain Bridges, causing disruption to vehicular traffic; they were either dispersed or arrested by police. Students protesting at the Montreal Exchange were dispersed by riot police. Montreal merchants and businesspeople complained that the protests were causing a negative impact on the city's commerce and on tourism.

Students who did not participate in the strike were blocked by protesters from attending classes at several institutions, including Valleyfield CEGEP, Université de Montréal, Concordia University, and Université du Québec à Montreal. The Quebec Superior Court issued injunctions against students who were demonstrating and blocking other students' access to classes at the Université de Montréal, the Université du Québec à Montréal, Laval University, and at the Collège d'Alma, threatening fines or arrest for picketing, assembly, and protest on university or college grounds. Judge Jean Lemelin explained the court's decision, stating "[t]he legality of the strike appears dubious considering Quebec's labour law, which only gives the right to strike to certain people and under very strict conditions." Still, groups of protesting students on 16 May walked through the corridors of Université du Québec à Montreal buildings and entered classrooms to disrupt ongoing classes and vandalize, leading the administration to suspend teaching. Students whose classes had been cancelled were, as they spoke to the media, heckled by protesters.

=== Failure to reach an agreement ===
A deal reached between Quebec Liberal Party representatives and student representatives was rejected by striking students on 10 May. The deal had been supported by student unions and major Quebec labour unions including the Quebec Federation of Labour, the Confédération des syndicats nationaux and by the Centrale des syndicats du Québec. On 14 May 2012, Education Minister Line Beauchamp resigned, saying she was "no longer part of the solution," and was replaced by Michelle Courchesne.

=== Processes leading to Bill 78's adoption ===
On 16 May 2012 Quebec Premier Jean Charest and Michelle Courchesne announced their plan to introduce Bill 78, which would suspend the winter semester at the remaining 14 public colleges and 11 universities where Québécois students remained on strike. The bill would also restrict assembly, picket and protest rights on campuses and throughout Quebec.

The bill was introduced by Michelle Courchesne on 17 May, and debated that day in Quebec's National Assembly. It was formally adopted on 18 May following a vote with 68 in favor and 48 opposed (with no abstentions).

== Provisions ==
Bill 78, which expires on 1 July 2013, suspends winter semester classes at 11 universities and 14 colleges where over 150,000 students were demonstrating or continue to demonstrate; classes for the fall and winter semesters at those locations will be completed by 30 September 2012 at the latest, without penalization to enrolled students. The Minister of Education, Recreation, and Sports is granted the ability to deem as not applicable certain other regulations or laws or to "[prescribe] any other necessary modification to" Bill 78 so as to provide for any dispositions deemed necessary to ensure the continuation of classes throughout the duration specified by the act.

The law makes it illegal to deny a person access to any place if that person has a right or duty to be there and further restricts "any form of gathering" that might cause such denial from assembling inside any educational building, on the grounds of such a building, and within 50 meters of the limits of those grounds. Employees of the colleges and universities may strike with accordance to the Labour Code, but they are still required to work their normal scheduled hours and carry out their usual duties.

Article 16 of the bill furthermore declares illegal any demonstration of more than 50 people, at any location in Quebec, unless the dates, times, starting point, and routes of those locations and also the duration of the venue and the means of transportation that will be used by participants, if applicable, have been submitted to and approved by Quebec police. It is then possible, at the police authority's discretion, to modify the location and date of the protest if it judges that the protest would pose a serious threat to the order and security of the public. The City of Montreal Bylaw P-6 has a similar provision.

According to the provisions of the bill, any infraction against its prohibitions require offenders to pay fines, which are paid for each day of infraction. Those fines amount to $1,000–$5,000 for individuals, $7,000–$35,000 for student or union leaders, and $25,000–$125,000 per day for student or labour organizations. Fines are doubled for second and subsequent offences. Universities or institutions which do not comply with the provisions of Bill 78 are subject to the daily fees paid by student or labour organizations.

The bill establishes a date after which all education employees must return to work, and prohibits them from striking should this, "by act or omission", prevent students from receiving instruction, or indirectly impede services.

== Reactions ==
=== Support for Bill 78 ===
Bill 78 has received support from Quebec Council of Employers. Its president, Yves-Thomas Dorval, stated that because of "the failure to comply with court orders issued in the past few weeks, the bill will have to include measures strong enough to achieve this objective in order to serve as a deterrent. This is especially true since certain cells will persist in a strategy designed to create and sustain chaos and intimidation despite the potential good intentions of the parties involved." Michel Leblanc, president and chief executive of the Board of Trade of Metropolitan Montreal has welcomed the new law as a way to protect downtown businesses, and André Poulin of Destination Centre-Ville has been supportive.

Justice Minister Jean-Marc Fournier has stated that the intent of the law is to return calm to Quebec society, and show respect to the rights and education of non-striking students.

=== Criticism of Bill 78 ===
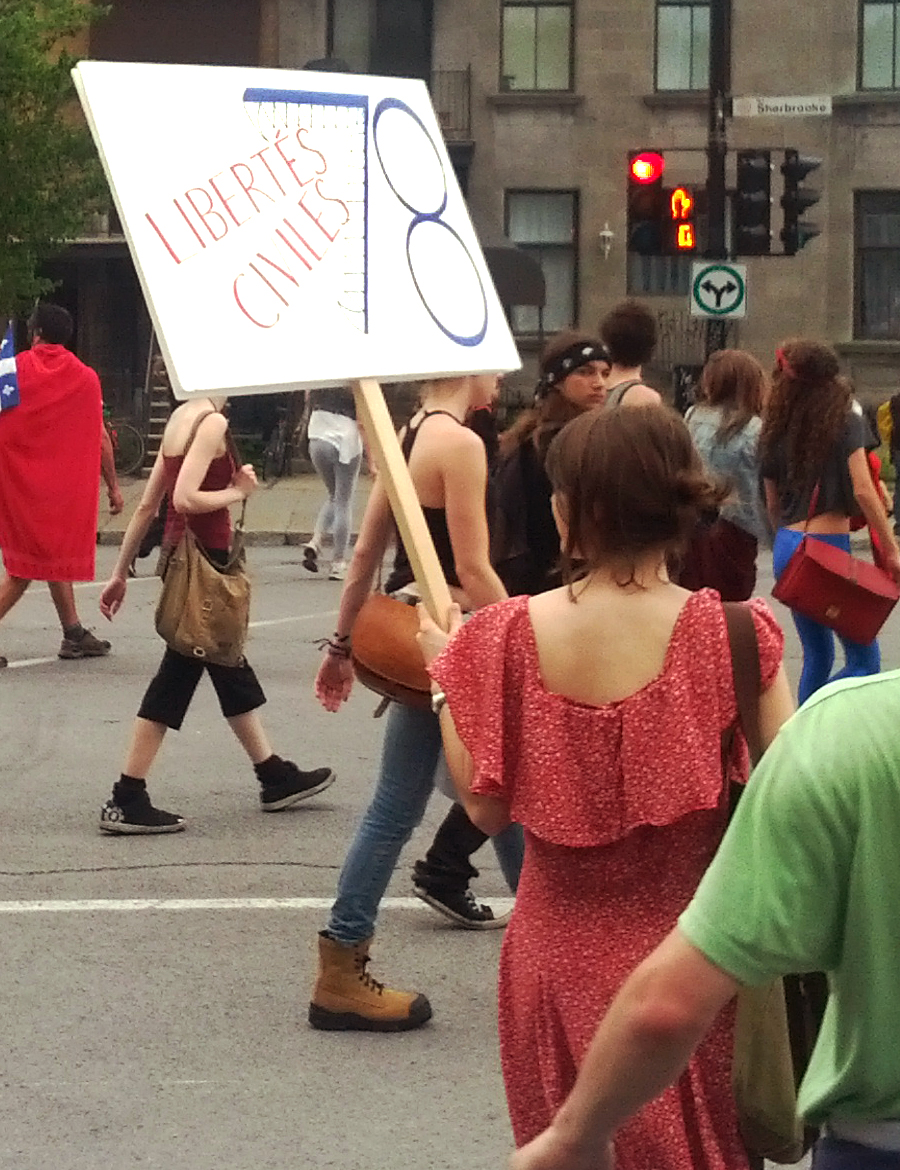
Protester displaying an anti Bill 78 sign on 22 May 2012 in Montreal

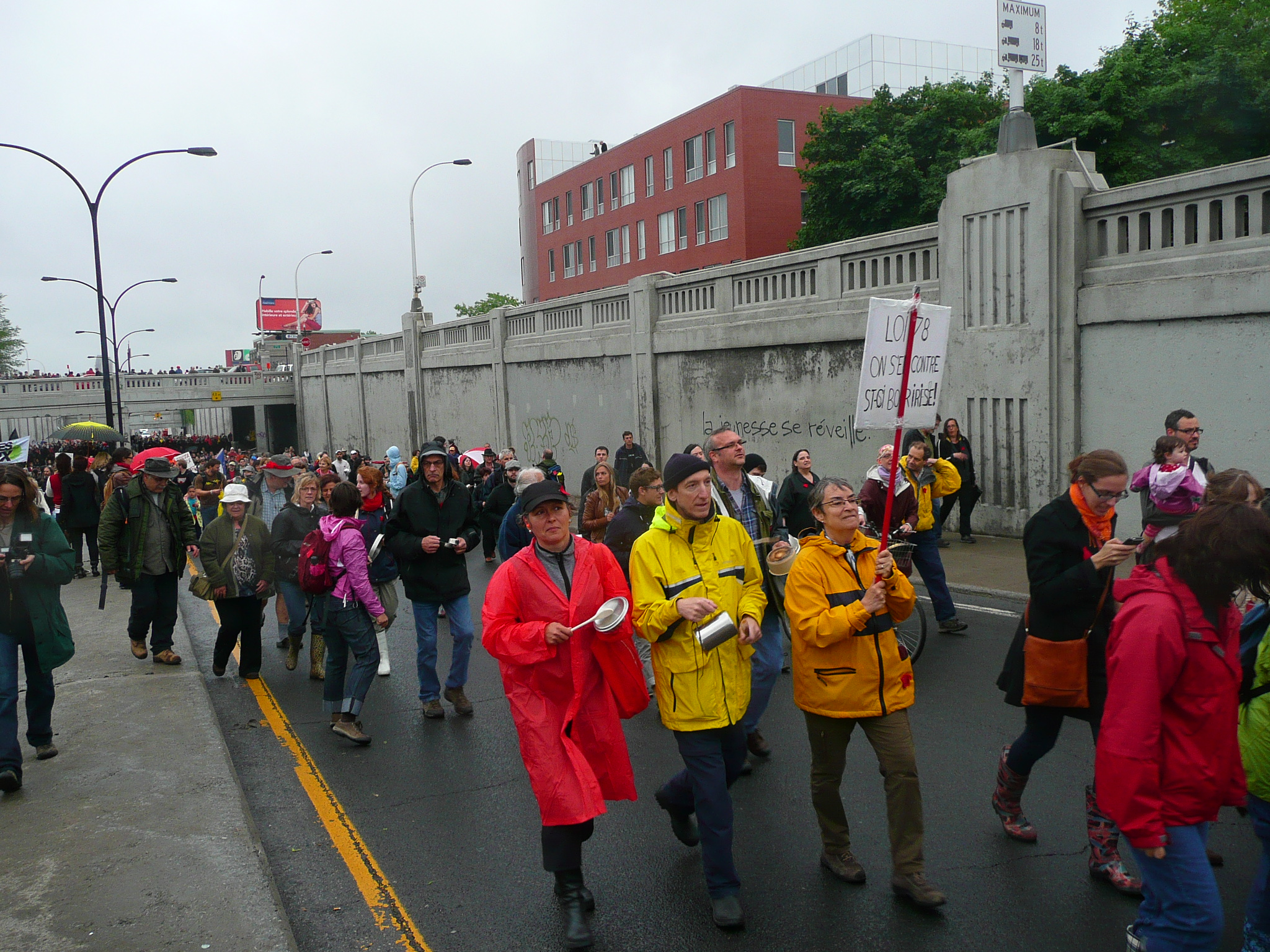
Thousands of Montreal citizens protesting Bill 78, the Charest government, and tuition hikes on Saturday, 2 June 2012

The Canadian Association of University Teachers has condemned the law for "violating fundamental freedoms of association, assembly, and expression", its president calling it "a terrible act of mass repression".

The Quebec Human Rights Commission has also condemned the legislation.

Louis Masson, head of the Bar of Quebec has questioned the constitutionality of the law, though the Canadian Press has stated that some members are upset with this position. A Laval law professor stated, "Read it. Stunned. Can't believe that a democratic government can adopt such a law." Professor Lucie Lemonde of Université de Montréal's law department stated the law was the second worst on record next to the War Measures Act.

Student Gabriel Nadeau-Dubois, co-spokesperson for the student association CLASSE (Coalition large de l'association pour une solidarite syndicale etudiante), has urged the population to consider disobeying the law. Université de Montréal philosophy professor Daniel Weinstock has stated that the bill is a scare tactic to frighten students and student leaders.

The bill was also criticized by the United Nations, with the UN High Commissioner stating that: "In the context of student protests, I am disappointed by the new legislation passed in Quebec that restricts their rights to freedom of association and of peaceful assembly". The bill was also denounced by opposition parties.

== Subsequent events ==
Passage of the bill on Friday, 18 May was followed by major weekend protests in Montreal and breakdown of law and order at night, which continued daily for over a month. News outlets reported the throwing of at least one and possibly more molotov cocktails, and the response of police with rubber bullets, tear gas and percussion bombs against protesters. Most other times protests were wholly peaceful. Several protesters wore masks in protest of Montreal's recent bylaw criminalizing their use in protests; the Conservative Harper government at the time had been seeking to make their use during unlawful assembly an offense punishable by up to 10 years' imprisonment. Police declared the weekend protests to be illegal from Montreal Bylaw P-6, arresting 69 persons on the night of the bill's passage, and 308 on the following night.

Members of CLASSE voted on 20 May to call for continued protests and civil disobedience to oppose the new law, in addition to any increase in tuition. Protests on the same day included an effort to march to the home of Quebec Premier Jean Charest. CLASSE spokesperson Nadeau-Dubois has stated that over 2,000 persons have been fined by police under the new law, which students have vowed to challenge. Responding to student calls for civil disobedience, Quebec Justice Minister Jean-Marc Fournier declared that the practice "is a nice word for vandalism."

Over 100,000 people marched in Montreal on 22 May, marking the 100th day of student protests. A Leger Marketing poll showed that 73% of Quebecers believe that Bill 78 will fail to halt protests; a spokesperson for the polling agency stated that for students, protests were not only about tuition increases but also "about the capitalist system." One third of Quebec college and university students, or approximately 155,000 people, still remained on strike.

Protests continued daily in the following days, with citizens now banging on pots and pans (cacerolazo) to express their opposition to Bill 78, first in Montreal and then in other cities and then to small towns across the province. Medias reported that many groups primarily concerned with the special law, and not necessarily sympathetic to students' demands, joined the gatherings across Quebec. After mass arrests on the nights of 22 and 23 May, daily protests where galvanized. On 28 May 2012, a group of lawyers demonstrated in Montreal against Bill 78.
