= Saul Polo =

Canadian politician

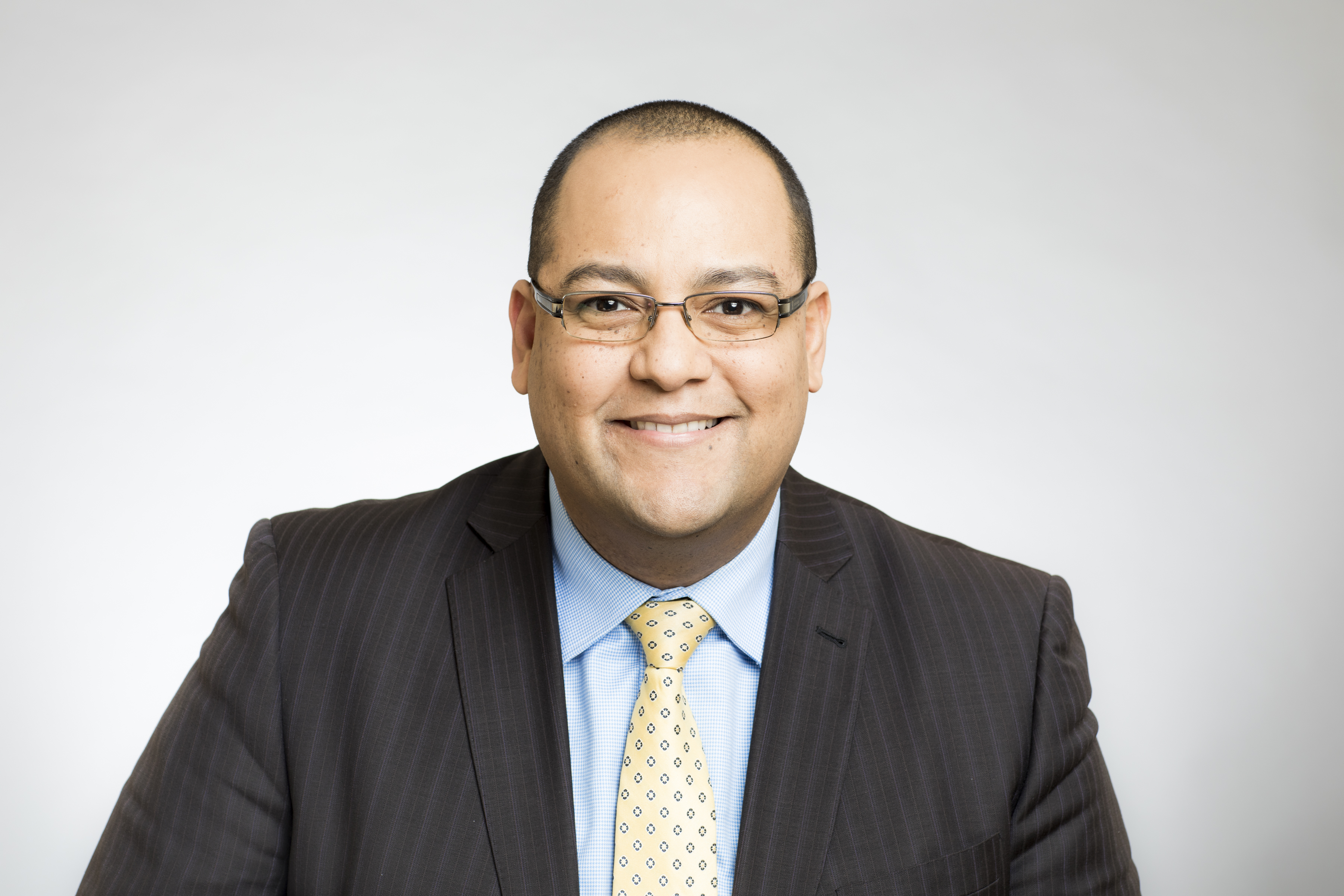

Member of the National Assembly of Quebec for Laval-des-Rapides
- In office April 7, 2014 – October 1, 2022
- Preceded by: Léo Bureau-Blouin
- Succeeded by: Céline Haytayan

Personal details
- Party: Quebec Liberal Party

Saul Polo is a Canadian politician in Quebec, who was elected to the National Assembly of Quebec in the 2014 election. He represented the electoral district of Laval-des-Rapides as a member of the Quebec Liberal Party until his defeat in the 2022 Quebec general election.

He has also served as president of the party from 2012 to 2014.

== Electoral record ==
2022 Quebec general election: Laval-des-Rapides
Party	Candidate	Votes	%	±%
Coalition Avenir Québec	Céline Haytayan	10,599	31.90	+1.16
Liberal	Saul Polo	9,546	28.73	-2.81
Québec solidaire	Josée Chevalier	5,542	16.68	-0.28
Parti Québécois	Andréanne Fiola	4,293	12.92	-2.48
Conservative	Nicolas Lussier-Clément	2,852	8.58	+7.51
Green	Zied Damergi	398	1.20	-0.99
Total valid votes		33,230	98.52	
Total rejected ballots		500	1.48	-0.30
Turnout		33,730	61.48	-0.20
Electors on the lists		54,861		
Coalition Avenir Québec gain from Liberal		Swing		+1.99

2018 Quebec general election: Laval-des-Rapides
Party	Candidate	Votes	%	±%
Liberal	Saul Polo	10,637	31.54	-12.67
Coalition Avenir Québec	Christine Mitton	10,366	30.73	+13.58
Québec solidaire	Graciela Mateo	5,721	16.96	+11.33
Parti Québécois	Jocelyn Caron	5,195	15.40	-15.76
Green	Estelle Obeo	738	2.19	+0.84
Conservative	Benoit Larocque	361	1.07	
Citoyens au pouvoir	Bianca Bozsodi	271	0.80	
New Democratic	Jean Phariste Pharicien	257	0.76	
Parti libre	Elias Progakis	184	0.55	
Total valid votes		33,730	98.22	
Total rejected ballots		611	1.78	+0.25
Turnout		34,341	61.68	-9.23
Eligible voters		55,678		
Liberal hold		Swing		-13.12
Source(s) "Rapport des résultats officiels du scrutin". Élections Québec.

2014 Quebec general election
Party	Candidate	Votes	%	±%
Liberal	Saul Polo	16,880	44.20	+11.93
Parti Québécois	Léo Bureau-Blouin	11,902	31.17	-7.16
Coalition Avenir Québec	Vincent Bolduc	6,552	17.16	-4.64
Québec solidaire	Nicolas Chatel-Launay	2,151	5.63	+1.41
Green	Léo McKenna	516	1.35	+0.02
Option nationale	David Voyer	188	0.49	-1.04
Total valid votes		38,189	98.47	–
Total rejected ballots		593	1.53	–
Turnout		38,782	70.91	-2.45
Electors on the lists		54,691	–	–
