= Céline Haytayan =

Canadian politician

Member of the National Assembly of Quebec for Laval-des-Rapides
- In office October 3, 2022 – August 27, 2026
- Preceded by: Saul Polo
- Succeeded by: Caroline De Guire

Personal details
- Party: Coalition Avenir Québec

Céline Haytayan is a Canadian politician, who was elected to the National Assembly of Quebec in the 2022 Quebec general election. She represented the riding of Laval-des-Rapides as a member of the Coalition Avenir Québec (CAQ).

She supported Christine Fréchette to become the next leader of the CAQ following the resignation of Francois Legault. She did not seek re-election in the 2026 general election.

== Electoral record ==
2022 Quebec general election: Laval-des-Rapides
Party	Candidate	Votes	%	±%
Coalition Avenir Québec	Céline Haytayan	10,599	31.90	+1.16
Liberal	Saul Polo	9,546	28.73	-2.81
Québec solidaire	Josée Chevalier	5,542	16.68	-0.28
Parti Québécois	Andréanne Fiola	4,293	12.92	-2.48
Conservative	Nicolas Lussier-Clément	2,852	8.58	+7.51
Green	Zied Damergi	398	1.20	-0.99
Total valid votes		33,230	98.52	
Total rejected ballots		500	1.48	-0.30
Turnout		33,730	61.48	-0.20
Electors on the lists		54,861		
Coalition Avenir Québec gain from Liberal		Swing		+1.99
