= Alain Paquet =

Canadian politician, professor, and economist

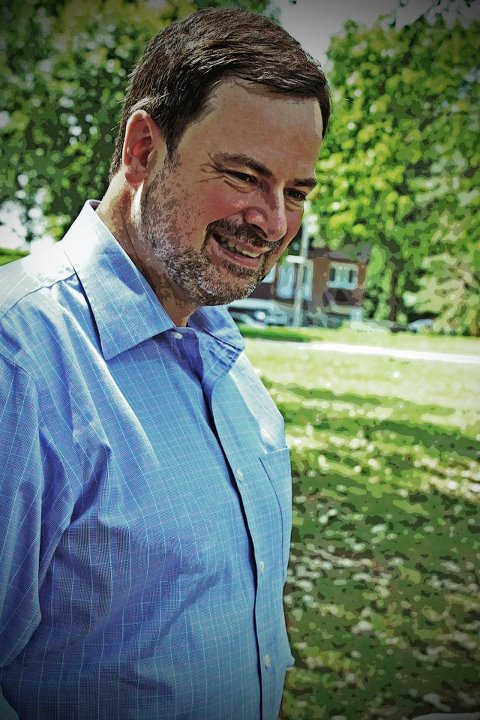
- Photograph of Alain Paquet

MNA for Laval-des-Rapides
- In office May 1, 2003 – 2012
- Preceded by: Serge Ménard
- Succeeded by: Léo Bureau-Blouin

Personal details
- Born: April 17, 1961 (age 65) Quebec City, Quebec
- Party: Quebec Liberal Party
- Profession: professor, economist

Alain Paquet (born April 17, 1961) is a Quebec politician, professor and economist. He was a Member of National Assembly of Quebec for the riding of Laval-des-Rapides and served as the province's Delegate Minister of Finance, from February 3, 2011, until his defeat in the 2012 Québec General Elections, to Leo Bureau-Blouin of the Parti Québécois. Paquet represented the Quebec Liberal Party.

Paquet went to the Université Laval and obtained a bachelor's degree in economics. He would then attend the University of Rochester and obtained a master's and a doctorate in economics and would add another master's degree at Queen's University.

He has been a professor since 1988 in the Faculty of Economics at the Université du Québec à Montréal. He was a research scholar for the centre for research on employment and economic variations for 14 years. He was also a guest consultant for the Bank of Canada, the Federal Reserve Bank of Minneapolis, the Department of Finance of Canada, the Department of Human Resources Development Canada, the Central Bank of Madagascar and the Malaysian Institute of Economic Research. He was a board member of the Quebec Consumers Association.

Paquet was elected in the 2003 elections and named the chair of the Public Finances Committee from 2003 to 2005 and later the parliamentary secretary to the Minister of Finance. He was re-elected in 2007.
