= Tía Pikachu =

Chilean teacher and activist

Giovanna Grandón
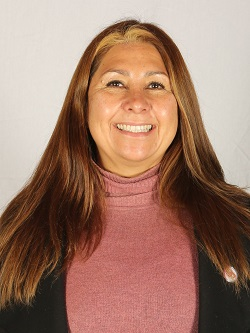
- Giovanna Grandón in 2021

Member of the Constitutional Convention
- In office 4 July 2021 – 4 July 2022
- Constituency: 12th District

Personal details
- Born: Giovanna Jazmín Grandón Caro; 6 May 1975 (age 51) Santiago, Chile
- Party: Independent
- Other political affiliations: The List of the People
- Website: www.giovannagrandon.cl
- Nickname: Aunt Pikachu

Giovanna Jazmín Grandón Caro (born 6 May 1975), also known as Tía Pikachu (Auntie Pikachu) or Baila Pikachu (Dancing Pikachu), is a Chilean preschool teacher, political activist, and politician. She obtained great attention during the 2019 Chilean protests due to her wearing a costume of Pikachu from the Japanese franchise Pokémon. On 16 May 2021, she was elected as a member of the Chilean assembly that will write the new Chilean constitution as a response to the 2019 protests.

== Early life ==
Giovanna Grandón was born in Santiago de Chile as the eldest of four sisters. From an early age, she helped her single mother with housework and taking care of her younger sisters. In her adolescence, she met Jorge Millán Abarzua, with whom she married in 1993 and had a daughter and three sons.

She worked as a vendor and a door-to-door saleswoman and later studied a technical career in early education, which she began to practice in 1996 at the National Board of Kindergartens, where her work consisted largely of educating and caring for children at social risk in their early childhood. In 2020, Grandón said in a YouTube live video that working as an educator was a difficult period in which the educators witnessed crude stories and experiences of their young students, who were at social risk.

Grandón began working as a school bus driver in 2015, providing services for a school in the Peñalolén commune. Before the social outburst, she lived at Lo Hermida neighborhood in the same commune, where she and her family were preparing to move to Piriápolis in Uruguay to look for new opportunities.

== Political career ==
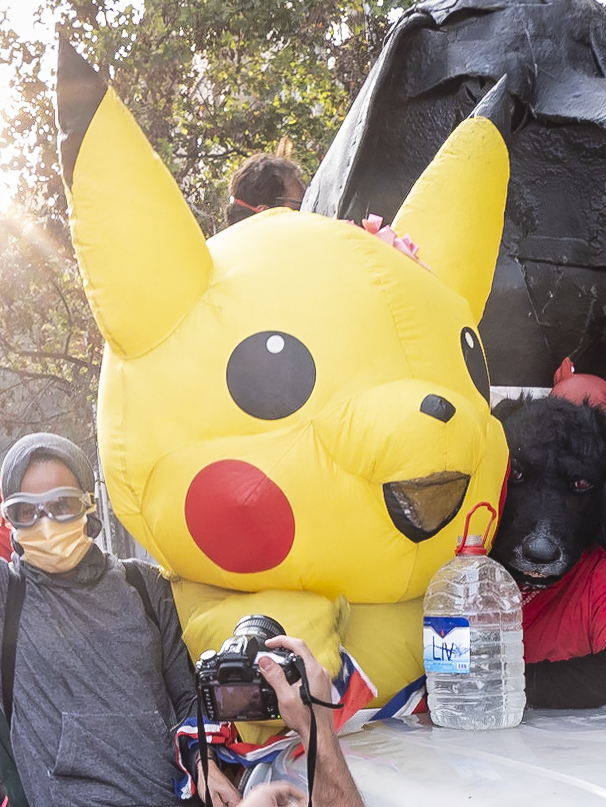
Giovanna Grandón as "Aunt Pikachu" during a 2020 protest

In mid-2019, Grandón's son, who was 7 years old at the time, had picked out his father's credit card and bought 600,000 Chilean pesos' (about 800 USD) worth of Detective Pikachu merchandise through a phone call. Seeing how they were unable to get a refund, Grandón and her husband planned to sell the items, but kept an inflatable Pikachu costume to use for Halloween. They later attended what is now considered to be the largest march in Chilean history, where 1.2 million people protested, with Grandón wearing the Pikachu costume. She became known as "Tía Pikachu" due to a series of viral videos of her dancing during the protest.

The viralization of the videos led one of her daughters to create an Instagram account for the character; in 24 hours, the account already had more than 24,000 followers. Her participation made her one of the symbolic characters of the large-scale demonstrations in which she continued to actively participate between October 2019 and March 2020.

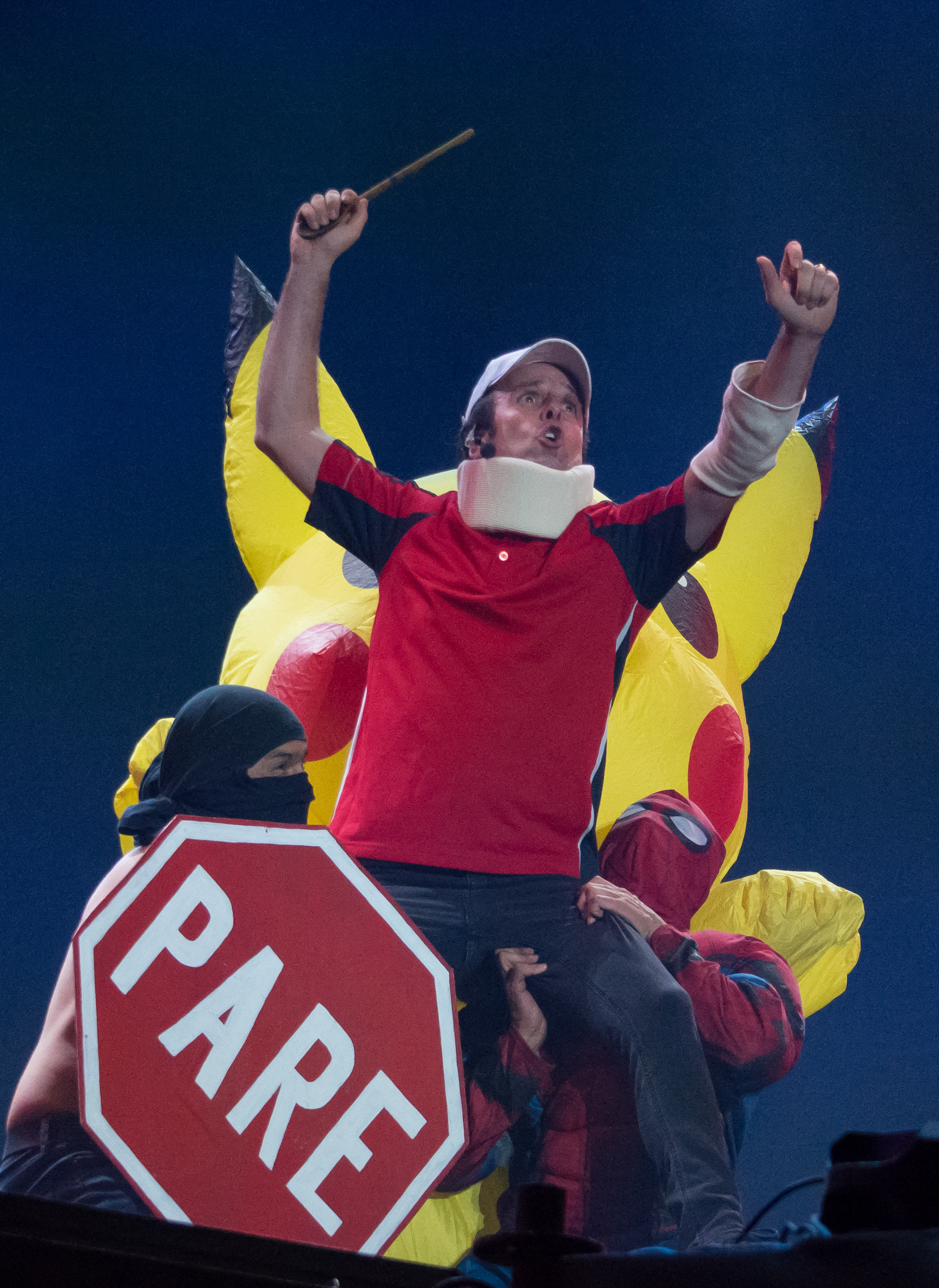
Grandón performing with Kramer in 2020

On 23 February 2020, she participated in a routine of the impersonator and comedian Stefan Kramer at the 2020 Viña del Mar festival. By February 2020, she had made a national tour visiting the cities of Concepción, Valdivia, and Osorno, among others. As of March, she had participated in charity concerts with Anita Tijoux and the 31 Minutos characters.

On 8 March, during a commemoration of International Women's Day, Grandón was shot with a rubber bullet in the foot during clashes with Carabineros police forces. During the following months of 2020, she continued to participate in public social activities and demonstrations.

Due to the COVID-19 Pandemic in Chile, the protests ceased. However, she continued to be a voice of criticism towards the Chilean state and how the pandemic exposed the weaknesses of the public and private systems.

With the announcement of the national plebiscite, with which the option of a new constitution would be voted, Grandón participated in the campaign activities for its approval.

On 31 October 2020, she was attacked by the Carabineros while she was participating in a demonstration on the side of the Pío Nono bridge. During the conflict, her suit was ripped open, she was punched in the face by a Carabineros officer and was doused with pepper spray.

As of May 2021, she has used seven Pikachu suits, since "the chemicals in the water from the riot trucks deteriorate the fabric with which it is made."

=== Constitutional Convention ===
As the mobilizations continued and demanded a change of the constitution, Grandón's supporters began to ask her to formalize her possible candidacy as a member of the Constitutional Convention which will write the new constitution. With the results of the national plebiscite, on 26 October of the same year she announced her interest in being a constituent candidate. She also pointed out that she rejected many offers from political parties to have her as a candidate.

With the creation of The List of the People pact, she joined it as a pre-candidate in November. Later, she obtained the sponsorships and signatures to make her candidacy official.

On 16 May 2021, she was elected as member of the Constitutional Convention for the 12th district with 20,935 (5.64%) votes in her favor.

== See also ==
- Anarchopanda
- Negro Matapacos
