= Bishop's University Students' Representative Council =

Students' Representative Council of Bishop's University (SRC)
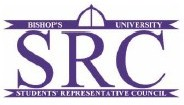
- Institution: Bishop's University
- Location: Sherbrooke, Quebec
- Established: 1893
- Website: www.busrc.com

The Bishop's University Students' Representative Council is a non-profit student-run organization to which all full-time students at Bishop's automatically belong.

"The SRC is responsible for a number of services offered to students and provides a variety of both academic and non-academic clubs through which students may become directly involved in Bishop's life. It is also responsible for several publications, including The Quad yearbook, The Mitre and the Handbook. In addition to this, the SRC is responsible for organizing events on campus, ranging from Orientation Week to the election of the valedictorian."

== History ==
One of the oldest student organizations in Canada, the Students' Executive Council of Bishop's University was founded in 1893.
It was renamed the Students' Representative Council following a referendum in the spring of 1979 which also re-organised the various vice-President positions, creating the VP Media Affairs to be responsible for Radio Bishop's (later CJMQ), the Campus Newspaper, the Mitre, the Quad (yearbook) and the Student Handbook. This constitutional change also removed all club representation from the Council, the clubs being represented by the VP positions. The constitution was subsequently revised in 1983, further structuring it. Following constitutional changes in 2006, the VP portfolios were again restructured, with the Vice-President of Social Affairs taking responsibility for clubs and societies.

Over the course of a three-month internal review process in the Fall 2015 semester, a committee of SRC members worked to evaluate the SRC's structure in an effort to improve its efficiency, productivity, inclusivity, legitimacy, transparency, and overall representation of Bishop's students. Following a constitutional amendment, the Student Event Coordinator and Student Affairs Representative positions were replaced by General Councillors, who represent Bishop's University students on issues relating to their portfolio.

The Bishop's University Students' Representative Council is the official representative of all the students at Bishop's University.

== SRC Operations ==
The Operations Department is in charge of the financial viability of the SRC. It also play a primary role in organizing Winterfest with the help of the Rail Jam coordinators. In addition to this, the General Manager of Operations ensures proper hiring protocol and effective performance of the SRC as a whole.

The SRC runs two on-campus operations: The Gait and Doolittle's General Store. The Gait opened in 2006, and is unique in that it is run and staffed completely by full-time students. The Gait is open every Thursday and Saturday, and caters to the student population. The SRC also owns and operates Doolittle's General Store, the only depanneur on campus. Doolittle's is the place to purchase beer, bus tickets, snacks, ice cream, and event tickets on campus. Doolittle's is also run and staffed completely by students. Overseeing the two operations is a Director of Finance and Operations. This full-time student is hired by the SRC and is, along with the Director of Communications and Marketing and the Director of Human Resources, one of the three non-elected Directors to sit on the SRC Executive Cabinet.

== Academic Affairs ==
The Academic Affairs Department is made up of 5 Divisional Senators, overseen by the VP Academic Affairs. Humanities, Social Sciences, Business, Education, and Natural Science are each represented by one student, who carries a vote at the Academic Senate of Bishop's University. Each of the Senators also sits on their divisional faculty meetings, as well as various sub-committees of the Senate.

== Student life ==
The Student Life Department is a recent creation, stemming from a constitutional overhaul during the 2015-2016 academic year. The Vice-President of Student Life is tasked with representing students in all non-academic areas of life at university. This includes students' health, well-being, safety, and security as they go about their time at Bishop's. The Student Life Department works closely with university administration to ensure that students' needs are met regarding student support services, dining facilities, athletics and recreation, residence, and a whole lot more. The Student Life Department also represents the student body on a number of Bishop's University committees, including the Student Services Directors Meeting, Health and Safety, Committee on Life at the University, and the Alcohol Concerns Committee. The department manages all social, cultural, academic, religious, and charity clubs.

== See also ==
- List of Quebec students' associations
