= Guy Bélanger (politician) =

Canadian politician

Personal details
- Born: February 18, 1942 (age 84) Chicoutimi, Quebec
- Education: Université de Montréal
- Occupation: Professor, Politician

Guy Bélanger (born February 18, 1942, in Chicoutimi, Quebec) is a former member of the National Assembly of Quebec.

He graduated with a master's degree at the Université de Montréal in 1971, and was a professor there from 1974 to 1979.

He was a municipal councillor in Saint-Bruno-de-Montarville, Quebec from 1979 to 1985. He was elected for the Quebec Liberal Party in the 1985 Quebec general election in Laval-des-Rapides, and re-elected in 1989. He resigned on June 16, 1993.
