= Léo Bureau-Blouin =

Canadian politician (born 1991)

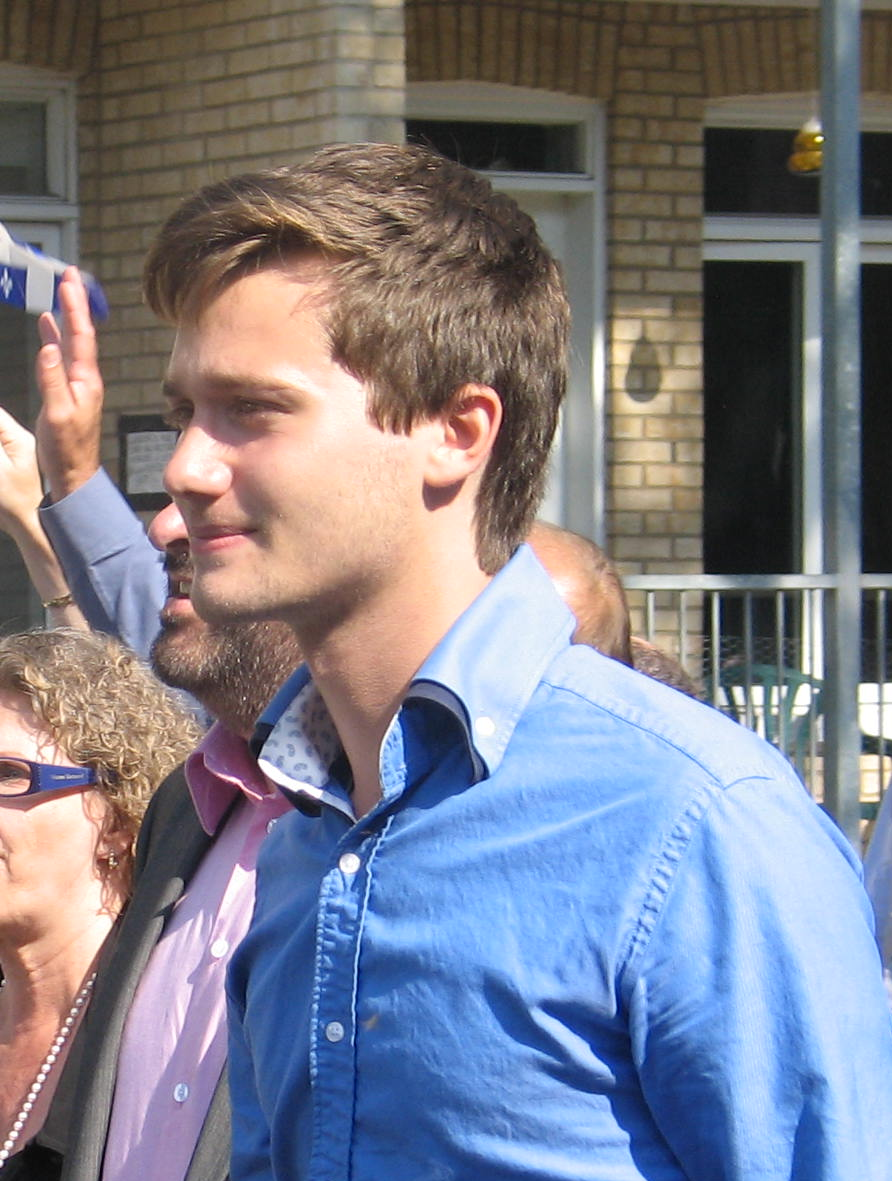
- Bureau-Blouin in 2012

MNA for Laval-des-Rapides
- In office 2012–2014
- Preceded by: Alain Paquet
- Succeeded by: Saul Polo

Personal details
- Born: December 17, 1991 (age 34) Montreal, Quebec, Canada
- Party: Parti Québécois

Léo Bureau-Blouin (born December 17, 1991) is a former Quebec politician who in the 2012 provincial election at age 20 became the youngest person ever to be elected as a member of the National Assembly of Quebec. He was elected in the district of Laval-des-Rapides for the Parti Québécois. He was previously a student leader, president of the Fédération étudiante collégiale du Québec, who played a key role in organizing the 2012 Quebec student protests. He lost his seat in the 2014 general election on April 7 to the Quebec Liberal Party candidate Saul Polo.

Bureau-Blouin was born in Montreal and grew up in Saint-Hyacinthe. At the time of the 2012 election he was enrolled as a law student at the Université de Montréal.

== See also ==
- Université Laval
