= 1996 Quebec student protests =

The 1996 Quebec student protests were a result of an increase in post-secondary tuition fees. Between the early 1980s and 1990s, average Canadian university tuition fees more than doubled. Before this time, there had been talk of eliminating tuition fees altogether. In 1976, the Canadian government signed the United Nations' International Covenant on Economic, Social, and Cultural Rights. This promised free education at all levels. However, in 1995, the Liberal Government announced a $7 billion funding cut to provincial programs, which includes tuition. Between this time, it was decided by Canadian government and education officials that free education was not feasible, and that to provide free education would mean providing nothing else for its citizens. In 1996, it was announced that over a period of four years, tuition was going to be raised $280 from its current $500 rate. Students organized themselves into student unions, and fought against this increase by protesting in the streets. There were also several 'walk-outs' performed by high school students. As a result of these protests, the tuition freeze remained in effect. However, a $500 penalty was placed on students who failed more than five classes.

== See also ==
- 2005 Quebec student protests
- 2012 Quebec student protests
