= Association pour une solidarité syndicale étudiante =

Student union in Quebec (2001–2019)

- Location: Montreal, Quebec
- Established: February 2001
- Abolished: 31 May 2019
- Members: 34 member associations
- Website: http://www.asse-solidarite.qc.ca/

The Association pour une solidarité syndicale étudiante ("Association for Student Union Solidarity"; ASSE) was a Canadian student union founded in February 2001 in Sherbrooke, Quebec, which contained about 56,000 CEGEP and university-level students in 34 member student unions throughout Quebec. The ASSÉ positioned itself distinctly from the other province-wide student unions, the Fédération étudiante universitaire du Québec (FEUQ), the Fédération étudiante collégiale du Québec (FECQ) and the Table de concertation étudiante du Québec (TaCEQ), namely rejecting hierarchical leadership structures in favor of autonomous and horizontal approaches.

The ASSÉ formed the core of the Coalition large de l'ASSÉ (CLASSE), a temporary coalition created to counter the tuition hike and coordinate 2012 Quebec student protests.

The organization was dissolved on May 31, 2019, a decision adopted in congress on April 28, 2019. A transition committee was also formed on this date.

== Philosophy ==
The Association pour une Solidarité Syndicale Étudiante advocated for free education at all levels and for all, including the abolition of student debt, conservation of quality post-secondary education, and the democratization of schools, while opposing the commodification of education.

It deployed mass mobilization as a catalyst for social change, favouring local general assemblies as decision-making structures as opposed to referendums, considered less democratic.

It also fought for responsible taxation, the defense of minority rights, the promotion of alter-globalization, demilitarization, implementation of public housing policy, and the irrevocable right to dissidence.

The basic principles of the ASSÉ lie on the foundations of student unionism as established in Article 1 of the Charter of Grenoble in 1946. The charter stipulates that the student is a young intellectual worker. Thus, students must be associated on a union basis. The ASSÉ believes in the necessity of fighting to save the gains made by past student movements, as well as to make new gains, through permanent protest. Considering education as a right rather than as a privilege, the ASSÉ is based on the following principles:

1. For quality, free, accessible, secular, non-discriminatory public education;
2. For adequate financial aid whose aim is to eliminate student debt and ensure that fundamental needs are met;
3. For a public education network free from private-sector intrusion, including contract manufacturing;
4. For democratisation of educational institutions from a perspective of self-management;
5. For union solidarity with all international progressive fights whose aim is society's well-being;
6. Against any and all forms of globalisation that support the predominance of profit over the population's well-being
7. For a combative feminism aiming to abolish patriarchy and all forms of oppression and discrimination.

== Member associations ==
College-level

- Association générale des étudiants du collège André-Laurendeau (AGECAL)
- Association étudiante du collège de Valleyfield (AGECoV)
- Association étudiante du cégep de Saint-Félicien (AECSF)
- Association étudiante du Cégep de Matane (AECM)
- Association étudiante du Cégep de Sherbrooke (AÉCS)
- Association étudiante du Cégep Saint-Laurent (AECSL)
- Association générale étudiante du Cégep de Drummondville (AGECD)
- Association générale des étudiantes et étudiants du Collège Lionel-Groulx (AGEECLG)
- Association générale étudiante du Cégep de Saint-Jérôme (AGES)
- Syndicat Étudiant du Cégep Marie-Victorin (SECMV)
- Société générale des étudiantes et des étudiants du collège de Maisonneuve (SOGÉÉCOM)

University-level

- Association facultaire des étudiant-e-s en art de l'UQAM (AFéa-UQAM)
- Association étudiante d’anthropologie de l’Université de Montréal (AEAUM)
- Association des étudiant(e)s en philosophie de l'Université de Montréal (ADÉPUM)
- Association étudiante des cycles supérieures en science politique de l'UQAM (AECSSP-UQAM)
- Association étudiante d'histoire de l'Université de Montréal (AEHUM)
- Association étudiante du module de science politique de l'UQAM (AÉMSP-UQAM)
- Association étudiante du module de sciences sociales de l'Université du Québec en Outaouais (AEMSS-UQO)
- Association facultaire étudiante de sciences humaines de l’UQAM (AFESH-UQAM)
- Regroupement des étudiants et étudiantes en sociologie de l'Université de Montréal (RÉÉSUM)
- Association des étudiantes et étudiants en Anthropologie de l’Université Laval (AÉÉA-UL)
- Association étudiante de science politique et philosophie (baccalauréat bidisicplinaire) de l'Université de Montréal (AESPEP)
- Association de création et études littéraires de l'université Laval (ACELUL)
- Association étudiante de théâtre de l'université Laval (AGÉTUL)
- Association Générale des Etudiantes et Etudiants Prégradués en Philosophie (AGEEPP-UL)
- Association des physiciens de l'Université Laval (ADÉPUL)
- Regroupement des étudiant-e-s en sociologie de l'Université Laval (RÉSUL)
- Art History and Communication Studies Graduate Student Association of McGill University (AHCSGSA)
- Fine Arts Student Alliance of Concordia University (FASA)
- School of Community & Public Affairs Student Association of Concordia University (SCPASA-AÉÉAPC)

== Executive council ==
- Hind Fazazi, coordination secretary and spokesperson
- Louis-Philippe Véronneau, treasurer
- Jeanne Reynolds, internal relations secretary
- Marc Boulanger, internal relations secretary and spokesperson
- Myriam Leduc, external relations secretary
- Samuel-Élie Lesage, academic affairs secretary
- François Desroches, information secretary

== 2005 student strike ==
On January 29, 2005, confronted with the refusal of then-Education Minister Pierre Reid to negotiate about financial aid reform, the ASSÉ holds a congress at Cégep de Saint-Laurent where it invites non-member associations to create the CASSÉÉ, the Coalition de l'Association pour une Solidarité Syndicale Étudiante Élargie. In February, the CASSÉÉ launches a series of referendums and general assemblies over the start of an unlimited general strike around three main demands:

1. The retroactive abolition of the reform to the Aide financière du Québec;
2. The abandonment of all decentralization and market alignment projects of the college network;
3. Both demands go towards free education and abolition of student debt.

On February 24, 2005, the first associations start the strike movement. On March 16, 2005, 70,000 students are CASSÉE members, out of the 230,000 students on strike at that moment, the others being FEUQ or FECQ members.

The CASSÉÉ is excluded from the negotiation table by the new Education Minister Jean-Marc Fournier because of its refusal to condemn violent acts posed during the strike. The CASSÉÉ, however, claims that it is to divide the student movement that the minister excluded it, since, shortly after the strike began, on February 16, 2005 at Montebello, students assembled by the FEUQ and the FECQ forced Château Montebello's door with a battering ram to disturb a Parti libéral du Québec caucus, leading to a Sûreté du Québec intervention.

The strike ends after the signature of an accord by the student unions and Minister Fournier that the Association pour une Solidarité Syndicale Étudiante qualifies of a "bargain accord" and is rejected by a majority of general assemblies, who still vote to return to class after 7 weeks of strike.

== 2012 student strike ==
Beginning in the summer 2011, the ASSÉ threatened the Quebec government to withart aning unlimited general strike.

== Organizational chart ==
=== Congress ===
The Congress is the supreme decision-making instance. It is made up of delegates of all member associations and works according to the one member, one vote principle. It normally convenes two or three times a year. In the annual congress, elections to fill the executive positions are held.

=== Coordination council ===
The coordination council aims to coordinate the work of the following instances:

==== Executive council ====
The executive council of the ASSÉ implements the mandates from the congress and the coordination council.

==== Permanent committees ====
- Women's committee
- Newspaper committee
- Mobilization committee

==== Work committees ====
The task of the work committees is to help the executive council and the member associations in their mandates.

- Training committee
- Social struggles committee
- Information committee
- Research and academic affairs committee

==== Regional councils ====
The regional councils serve to coordinate the associations in their union work.

- Conseil régional de l'ASSÉ à Montréal (CRAM)
- Mobilisation des associations solidaires du Sud-Est (MASSE)
- Conseil régional avant-gardiste de l'ASSÉ dans les Laurentides, Laval et Lanaudière (CRAALLL)
- Front régional de l'ASSÉ à Québec (FRAQ)
- Conseil régional de l'ASSÉ au Saguenay-Lac-Saint-Jean
- Conseil régional de l'ASSÉ du Centre-du-Québec

== See also ==
- Coalition large de l'ASSÉ (CLASSE)
- 2012 Quebec student strike
- 2005 Quebec student strike
- Quebec City Summit of the Americas, in 2001
- Fédération étudiante collégiale du Québec (FECQ)
- Fédération étudiante universitaire du Québec (FEUQ)
