= Fédération étudiante universitaire du Québec =

- Location: Montreal, Quebec
- Established: 1989
- Abolished: 2015
- Members: 9 member associations (71,000 university students)
- Website: www.feuq.qc.ca

The Fédération étudiante universitaire du Québec (French pronunciation: [fedeʁɑsjɔ̃ etydjɑ̃t ynivɛʁsitɛːʁ dy kebɛk]; "University Student Federation of Quebec"; FEUQ) was a federation of university students' unions created following the lifting of the tuition freeze in 1989. It included 9 member associations, which represent more than 71 000 Quebec university students. The federation dissolved in March 2015.

== Member Associations at the time of Dissolution ==
- Association étudiante de l'école des sciences de la gestion (AéESG) (Université du Québec à Montréal).
- Association des étudiants des cycles supérieurs de Polytechnique inc. (AÉCSP) (École polytechnique de Montréal)
- Association des Étudiants de l’École Nationale d’Administration Publique (AEENAP) (École nationale d'administration publique)
- Association des Étudiants de Polytechnique (École polytechnique de Montréal)
- Association générale des étudiants et étudiantes de l'Institut Armand-Frappier (AGEIAF) (Institut Armand-Frappier)
- Association Générale Étudiante de l'UQAT (AGEUQAT) (Université du Québec en Abitibi-Témiscamingue)
- Concordia Student Union (CSU) (Concordia University)
- Fédération étudiante de l'Université de Sherbrooke (FEUS) (Université de Sherbrooke)
- Post-Graduate Students' Society (PGSS) (McGill University)

== See also ==
- Fédération étudiante collégiale du Québec, its former College counterpart
- Association pour une solidarité syndicale étudiante
- Table de concertation étudiante du Québec
