= Fédération étudiante collégiale du Québec =

- Location: Montreal, Quebec
- Established: 1990
- President: Antoine Dervieux
- Vice president: Jacob Parisée
- General secretary: Christopher Zéphyr
- Members: 70,000 members (28 associations)
- Website: www.fecq.org

The Fédération étudiante collégiale du Québec (French pronunciation: [fedeʁɑsjɔ̃ etydjɑ̃t kɔleʒjal dy kebɛk]; "College students federation of Quebec"; FECQ) is a federation of college student unions, created in March 1990 after the failure of the 1989 strike (its first motto was "Plus jamais la grève!", in English: The strike, never again!). The FECQ mainly use lobbying with political parties to represent the students interests. At its peak, the FECQ claims to have represented 28 student associations and over 80,000 CÉGEP students – however, there is controversy about the actual number of members it has.

== Fondation ==
The FECQ was founded in Chicoutimi, in 1990, during the mobilization against the increase of university tuition fees imposed by Minister Claude Ryan, by a group of college student associations that were resistant to the unlimited general strike advocated by the main student group at the time, the Association nationale des étudiants et étudiantes du Québec (ANEEQ). Disappointed by the failure of the ANEEQ's last mobilizations, these resistant associations wanted to move away from the combative union tradition that had been dominant until then within the student movement, and move towards a model of student struggle based on consultation and partnership with the state.

== Notable figures from FECQ history ==
- Léo Bureau-Blouin

== See also ==
- Fédération étudiante universitaire du Québec, its former university counterpart
- Association pour une solidarité syndicale étudiante
