= List of trade unions in Canada =

This is a list of trade unions in Canada, broken down by affiliation.

== Canadian Labour Congress ==
=== National Affiliates ===
- Air Canada Pilots Association (1995–2023)
- Alliance of Canadian Cinema, Television and Radio Artists
- British Columbia Teachers' Federation
- Canadian Federation of Nurses Unions
- Canadian Football League Players' Association (CFLPA)
- Canadian Office and Professional Employees Union
- Canadian Postmasters and Assistants Association
- Canadian Union of Postal Workers
- Canadian Union of Public Employees
- Directors Guild of Canada
- Elementary Teachers' Federation of Ontario
- National Union of Public and General Employees
- National Union of the Canadian Association of University Teachers
- Ontario English Catholic Teachers' Association
- Ontario Secondary School Teachers' Federation
- Professional Institute of the Public Service of Canada
- Public Service Alliance of Canada

=== International Affiliates ===
- Air Line Pilots Association, International
- Amalgamated Transit Union
- American Federation of Musicians
- Bakery, Confectionery, Tobacco Workers and Grain Millers' International Union
- Communications Workers of America
- International Alliance of Theatrical Stage Employees
- International Association of Bridge, Structural, Ornamental and Reinforcing Iron Workers
- International Association of Fire Fighters
- International Association of Heat and Frost Insulators and Allied Workers
- International Association of Machinists and Aerospace Workers
- International Association of Sheet Metal, Air, Rail and Transportation Workers
- International Brotherhood of Electrical Workers
- International Brotherhood of Boilermakers, Iron Ship Builders, Blacksmiths, Forgers and Helpers
- International Federation of Professional and Technical Engineers
- International Longshore and Warehouse Union
- International Longshoremen's Association
- International Plate Printers, Die Stampers and Engravers' Union of North America
- International Union of Bricklayers and Allied Craftworkers
- International Union of Operating Engineers
- International Union of Painters and Allied Trades
- Laborers' International Union of North America
- Office and Professional Employees International Union
- Seafarers' International Union of North America
- Service Employees International Union
- UNITE HERE!
- United Association
- United Auto Workers
- United Food and Commercial Workers
- United Mine Workers of America
- United Steelworkers

== Independent unions/other affiliations ==
- Alberta Union of Provincial Employees
- Alliance des professeures et professeurs de Montréal
- AMAPCEO
- Association des enseignantes et des enseignants franco-ontariens
- Canadian Actors' Equity Association
- Canadian Teachers’ Federation
- Centrale des syndicats du Québec
- Christian Labour Association of Canada
- Confédération des syndicats nationaux
- Congress of Democratic Trade Unions
- Confederation of Canadian Unions
- Fédération des travailleurs et travailleuses du Québec
- Industrial Workers of the World
- International Union of Elevator Constructors
- Major League Baseball Players Association
- Major League Soccer Players Association
- National Basketball Players Association
- National Hockey League Players' Association
- National Police Federation
- Nova Scotia Union of Public and Private Employees
- Operative Plasterers' and Cement Masons' International Association
- Professional Association of Foreign Service Officers
- Professional Footballers Association Canada
- Professional Women's Hockey League Players Association
- Teaching Support Staff Union
- International Brotherhood of Teamsters
  - Teamsters Canada
- Writers Guild of Canada
- Unifor
- United Brotherhood of Carpenters

== Defunct trade unions ==
- All-Canadian Congress of Labour (1926–1940)
- Barbers, Beauticians and Allied Industries International Association
- Boot and Shoe Workers' Union
- Canadian Association of Industrial Mechanical and Allied Workers
- Canadian Auto Workers
- Canadian Brotherhood of Railway Employees
- Canadian Chemical Workers' Union
- Canadian Food and Allied Workers
- Canadian Labour Union
- Canadian Mineworkers Union
- Canadian Paperworkers' Union
- Canadian Seamen's Union
- Communication Workers of Canada
- Communications and Electrical Workers of Canada
- Communications, Energy and Paperworkers Union of Canada
- Energy and Chemical Workers Union
- Graphic Arts International Union
- Graphic Communications International Union
- International Printing and Graphic Communications Union
- International Printing Pressmen and Assistants' Union of North America
- International Union of Electrical Workers
- International Woodworkers of America
- Journeymen Tailors Union
- Lumber Workers Industrial Union
- Lumber Workers Industrial Union of Canada
- Mine Workers' Union of Canada
- One Big Union (Canada)
- Paving Cutters' Union
- Relief Camp Workers' Union
- Union of Russian Workers
- United Brotherhood of Railway Employees
- United Fishermen and Allied Workers' Union
- Vancouver and District Waterfront Workers' Association
- Western Federation of Miners
- Workers' Unity League

== See also ==
- Global list of trade unions
- List of trade unions in the United States
- List of unions affiliated with the AFL-CIO
- Canadian labour law
- Canadian Labour Code
- Labour movement
