= 1972 Québec general strike =

General strike in Québec in 1972

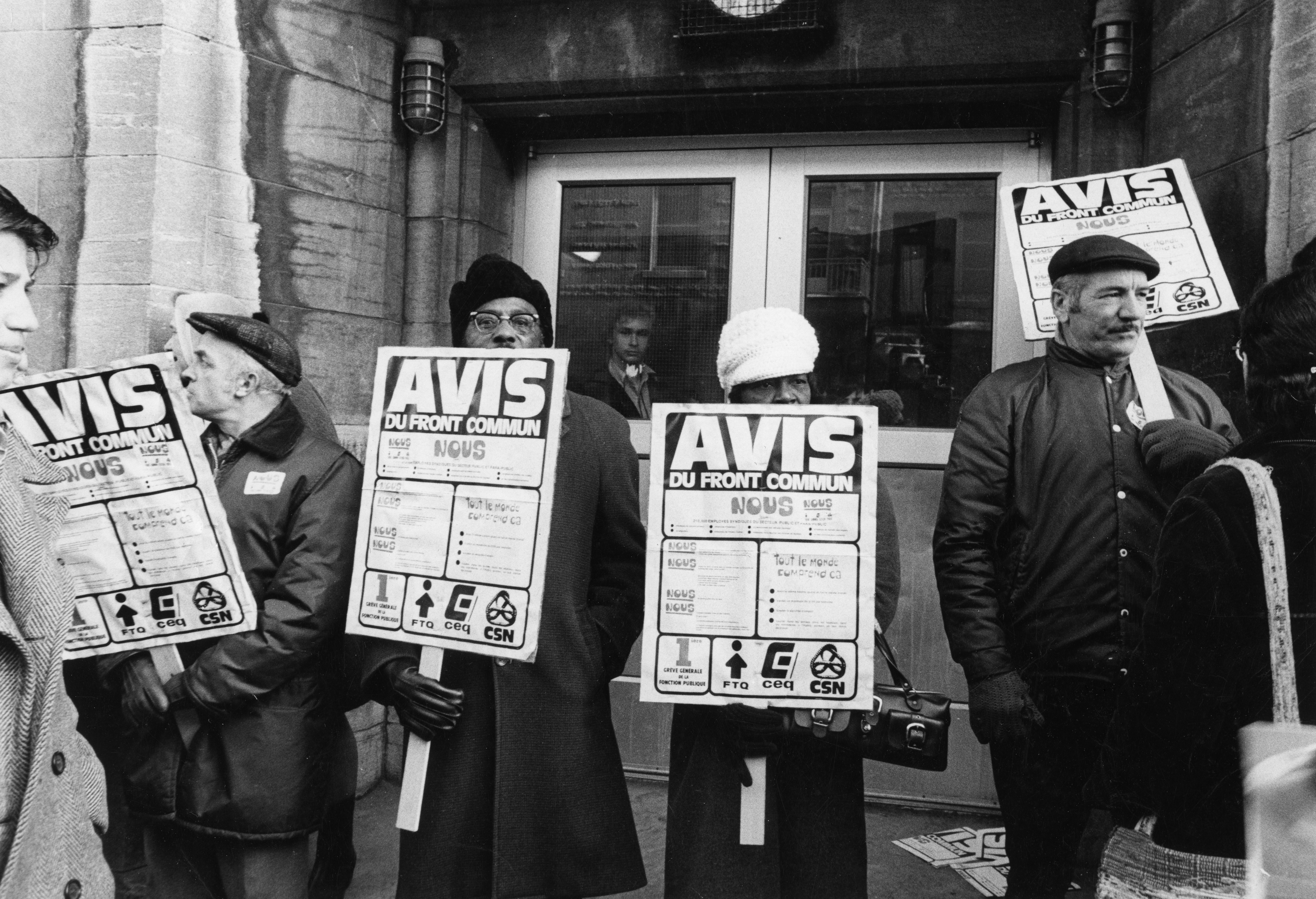
Picket line during the 1972 Québec general strike

The 1972 Québec general strike was a general strike that took place in Québec in 1972. The strike began on 11 April and lasted until 21 April, when the government of Québec banned the workers from striking and imprisoned the leaders of the three unions, as well as several dozen union organisers. With around 300 000 workers participating, it was one of the largest strikes in North American history.

== Background ==
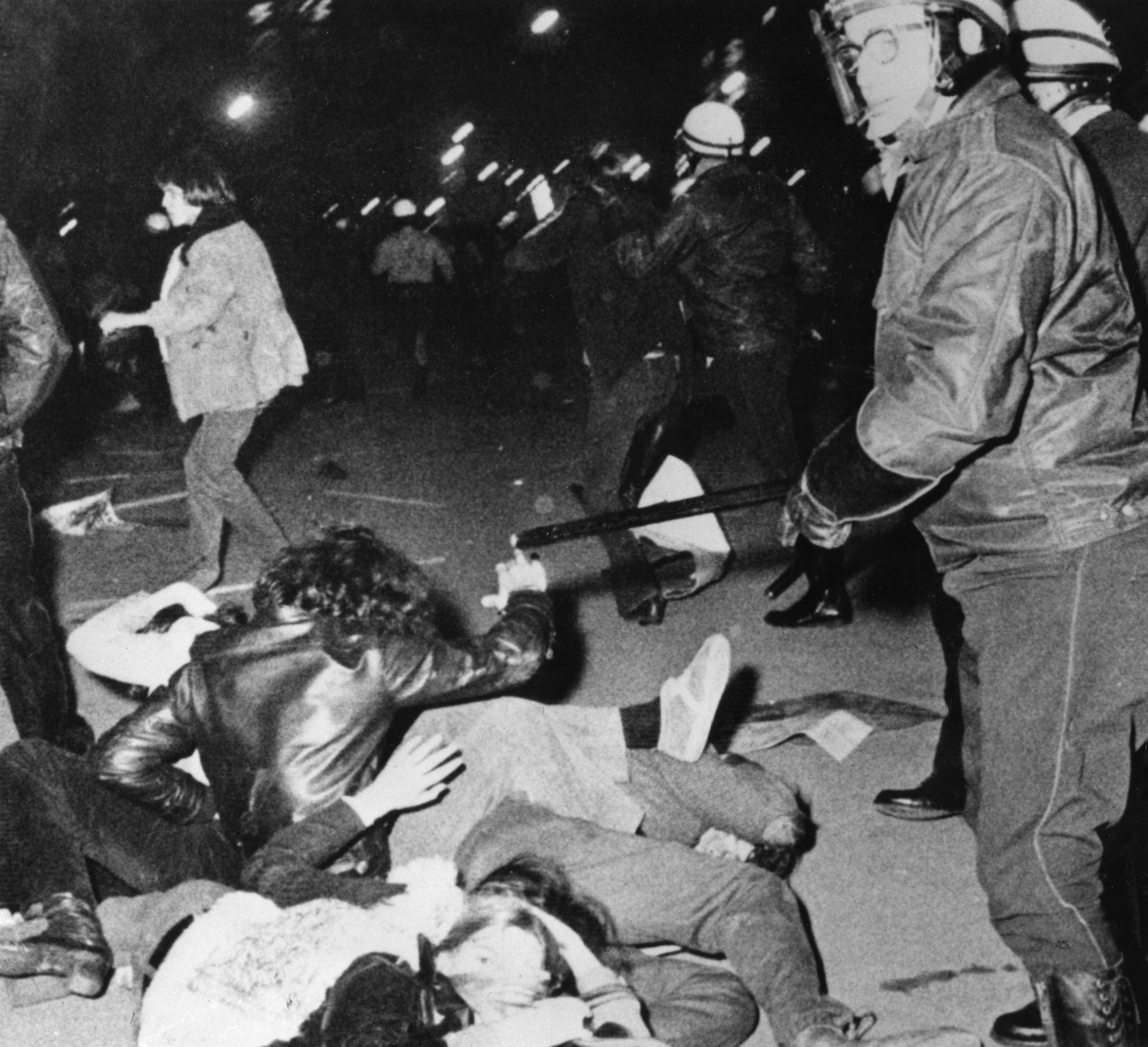
Police crackdown on a demonstration held in support of locked-out workers during the 1971 La Presse lockout

From July 1971 to February 1972, a significant labour dispute had occurred at La Presse newspaper, after the Power Corporation of Canada locked-out the paper's typographers. In late-October 1971, a mass demonstration was held in Montréal in solidarity with the locked-out workers, with over 12 000 people attending, but was met with a heavy police crackdown, resulting in over 190 injuries and 200 arrests, as well as the death of 28-year-old student Michèle Gauthier. The crackdown provoked significant concerns among union leaders in Québec, leading to greater cross-union talks and an increased sense of urgency to take action.

== Strike action ==
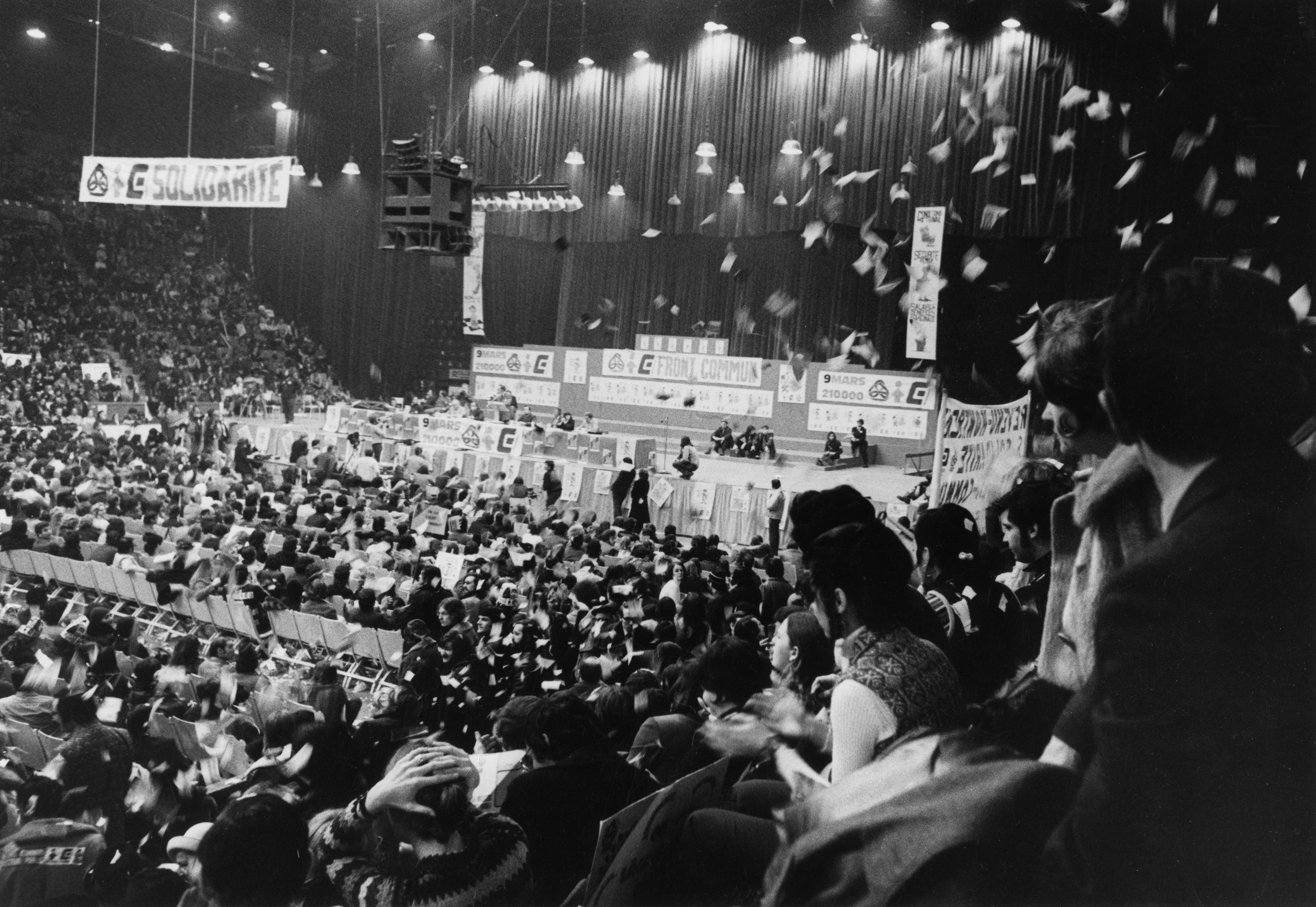
General assembly of the Front Commun at the Montreal Forum in March 1972

In early 1972, the Front Commun intersyndical was formed, consisting of the Confédération des syndicats nationaux (CSN), led by Marcel Pepin, the Fédération des travailleurs et travailleuses du Québec (FTQ), led by Louis Laberge, and the Centrale des syndicats du Québec (CSQ), led by Yvon Charbonneau.

On 7 March, the three unions held a general assembly at the Montreal Forum. At the general assembly, the workers of the three unions voted in favour of launching a general strike with demands for a $100 per week minimum wage, an 8% raise so that salaries could keep pace with inflation, greater worker influence in corporate decision-making, and equal pay for equal work regardless of region or gender. Later that month, after the government of Québec refused to consider the demands, the Front Commun launched a one-day general strike, however, the government still refused to consider their demands.

On 11 April, the Front Commun launched an indefinite general strike, encompassing a wide range of sectors across the province, including hospitals, schools, construction, and hydro. 9000 workers from the Canadian Union of Public Employees (CUPE) also joined the strike.

The government responded to the strike by placing injunctions on 61 hospitals to attempt to force the workers at those hospitals back to work, but the injunctions failed to have the desired effect as the workers defied them and accused the government of falsifying stories of deteriorating conditions. On 19 April, the government arrested 13 hospital workers for their roles in the strike, incarcerating them for six months and issuing them fines of $500. In the following days, the government would further arrest over one hundred workers.

== Dissolution of the strike and wildcat action ==
On 21 April, at 6 o'clock in the morning, the government of Québec adopted Bill 19, with the goal of forcibly breaking the strike. The law banned all strikes from occurring in the province until the end of June. In response to the bill, the unions attempted to hold an emergency vote on whether to continue the strike, resulting in a vote of around 60% in favour of continuing, however turnout was adversely affected by the short notice, with less than half of workers voting. That evening, the union leaders reluctantly advised the workers to return to work, saying that the vote had not resulted in a large enough majority to make open defiance of the law realistic.

However, the call to end the strike provoked schisms within the Front Commun, and the passage of Bill 19 provoked significant backlash, leading to a number of wildcat strikes throughout the province. On 9 May, Pepin, Lagerge, and Charbonneau were arrested on charges of having encouraged the members of their unions to continue striking and were sentenced to a year's incarceration. The arrests of the union leaders sparked even further unrest across the province, leading to a number of wildcat strikes, notably in the town of Sept-Îles, which saw a general strike of almost its entire population from 10 to 17 May. During the strike in Sept-Îles, the unions barricaded the Quebec Route 138 passing through the town and seized control of the town's airport and broadcasting station. Attempts by the province to fly in riot police failed to suppress the strike. On the first day of the Sept-Îles strike a vehicle-ramming attack was perpetrated by a local Quebec Liberal Party organiser on a crowd of workers gathered around the town's courthouse, injuring 35 and killing Herman Saint-Gelais, a 22-year-old metalworker. Radio stations in twenty-two other towns across the province also saw temporary occupations, including in Montréal and in Saint Jerome, before being pushed out by police. In Montréal, on 11 May, protestors littered one of the city's bridges with nails, causing significant traffic delays.

On 15 May, Bourassa announced that Minister of Labour Jean Cournoyer would meet with the three union leaders with the goal of re-opening negotiations, warning that if tensions continued to mount, the government would take "firm action to ensure the stability of our institutions." On 25 May, the three union leaders were temporarily released from prison in order to conduct negotiations.

On 2 February 1973, the three union leaders were returned to prison to continue their sentences, and remained incarcerated until May 1973, when they were granted conditional release.

== Analysis ==
Writing for Maclean's in July 1972, journalist Ann Charney noted that the Bourassa government "felt that it need do little more than wait for the momentum to die of its own accord" and that the Québec media "set up its own solid common front to provide one-sided, anti-union, inflammatory 'information,'" leading to the government underestimating the size of the backlash when it arrested Pepin, Lagerge, and Charbonneau. According to Swarthmore College's Global Nonviolent Action Database, "many blame the failure of the strike to achieve more of its goals on the disorganization of the three leaders of the union federations," with critics believing that the leaders "should have taken advantage of the huge level of energy among strikers to encourage them to insist that the government meet the specific wage and equal rights demands made at the beginning of the campaign."

Pierre Elliott Trudeau, who was federal Prime Minister at the time of the strike and had been a prominent figure in Quiet Revolution of the 1960s, stated that "Québec is a difficult province to govern" in response to the strike, adding that since the Revolution "it has thrown away a lot of its traditional values, and it has not yet found its new ones."

Réjean Parent, president of the CSQ from 2003 to 2012, has stated that the strike was "long seen as the apogee of syndicalism in action," but that its ultimate legacy has been overshadowed by rising corporate capitalism in decades since.

== Legacy ==
Although the general strike failed to secure a $100 per week minimum wage in 1972, that goal would eventually be reached in 1974. In 1976, Canada saw another significant general strike, the 1976 Canadian general strike against the wage controls imposed by the federal government's Bill C-73. The 1976 general strike lasted one day and saw the participation of around 1,2 million workers.

In 1996, filmmaker Magnus Isacsson released a documentary titled The Big Upheaval (Le Grand Tumulte) about the strike.

In 2020, filmmakers David Simard and Pierre-Luc Junet began filming a documentary titled Pouvoir Oublier : Autopsie du Front commun on the long-term impact of the strike.

In April 2022, on the fiftieth anniversary of the strike, the three unions behind the Front Commun announced they would attempt to form a new Front Commun ahead of the upcoming widespread public sector collective bargaining window in 2023.
