= Communist Party of Quebec =

Provincial political party in Canada

Communist Party of Quebec Parti communiste du Québec
- Abbreviation: PCQ-PCC
- Leader: Adrien Welsh
- Founded: 1965
- Newspaper: Clarté
- Ideology: Communism; Marxism–Leninism; Quebec self-determination
- Political position: Far-left
- National affiliation: Communist Party of Canada (Note: The Communist Party of Quebec is nominally independent from the Communist Party of Canada.)
- Colours: Red
- Seats in the National Assembly: 0 / 125

Website
- particommunisteduquebec.ca

The Communist Party of Quebec (French: Parti communiste du Québec, pronounced [paʁti kɔmynist dy kebɛk], PCQ-PCC) is a provincial political party in Quebec. It is politically affiliated with, but officially independent from, the Communist Party of Canada (CPC). The PCQ-PCC publishes the newspaper Clarté.

Communists have run in elections in Quebec since 1936. The CPC was banned in 1941 and its branch in Quebec was consequently renamed the Parti ouvrier-progressiste (Labor-Progressive Party), and the Labor-Progressive Party federally. The party restored its original name in English and French in 1959. In 1965, CPC members in Quebec established the Parti communiste du Québec. Sam Walsh was secretary of the Quebec wing of the Communist Party of Canada from 1962 to 1965 and leader of the Quebec party from 1965 to 1990.

In 2002, the PCQ-PCC joined in a federation with the Rassemblement pour l'alternative progressiste and the Parti de la démocratie socialiste to form the Union des forces progressistes, which in turn merged with Option Citoyenne to form Québec solidaire. The PCQ-PCC left Québec solidaire in 2017, when Québec solidaire merged with Option nationale.

In 2005, André Parizeau, then a leading figure of the organization in Quebec, was expelled from the Communist Party of Canada for factionalism, which also resulted in his exclusion from the PCQ-PCC. The dispute centred on Parizeau’s organization of a parallel party convention, as well as his support for Quebec sovereignty and closer ties with the Quebec nationalist movement, all of which were rejected by the Communist Party of Canada. The provincially registered party had already been deregistered by Élections Québec in 2003. Parizeau subsequently registered a provincial party under his control in 2006; however, that party did not field candidates between 2006 and 2012 and lost its authorization in 2012 due to an insufficient number of members. Parizeau eventually disavowed the Communist Party and ran as a candidate for the Bloc québécois in the 2019 Canadian federal election.

After a significant influx of members in the early 2020s, the PCQ-PCC registered the Parti communiste du Québec with Élections Québec in 2023. The Communist Party of Quebec ran 10 candidates for the 2026 Quebec general election.

== History ==
=== Origins ===
Despite the strong influence of the Catholic Church on Quebec society, and the small size of the working class associated with the economic 'maldéveloppement' of Quebec's economy, the debate and discussion of radical, democratic, and progressive ideas in Quebec has a long tradition going back to before the Patriots' War. While the Catholic Church, particularly after the Russian Revolution in 1917, waged an active campaign from the pulpit against trade unionists, leftists and Communists, Marxist discussion already had taken hold in Quebec by the early 1920s.

In 1920, Annie Buller, an anglophone native of Montreal, returned from attending the New York Rand School, and helped found the Montreal Labour College with Becky Buhay and Bella Gauld in 1920. The Labour College was deeply connected to labour unions. In 1921, Buller became a founding member of the underground Communist Party of Canada (CPC) which united other radical labour activists from Nova Scotia to BC. The three Montreal women became leaders of the Workers Party of Canada, the legal formation of the CPC, which applied for recognition with the Comintern. The Labour College became a launch-pad for the Communists in Quebec among the working-class anglophone community.

Around the same time, in 1923 radical militant Albert Saint-Martin also proposed establishing a French-Canadian section of the Communist International in the USSR. Like many of the early founders of the CPC, Saint-Marin's background was in anarchism. While the request was rejected by the international and the Communists were instructed build a united party, the Comintern it did not ignore the special national situation that presented itself in Quebec. (The internationalist commitment of the CPC would be important in helping the party better understand Quebec's situation and eventually adopt a policy supporting the right of self-determination and sovereignty, up to and including separation.)

The Communists therefore began organizing in the area with Quebec as part of a department of the CPC, at times joined with northern Ontario. By the end of the 1920s an active group had made something of break-through in the Jewish community of Montreal and elsewhere among some French-speaking workers across Quebec, organizing needle-trade workers. There was also an active group of the Young Communist League and the Young Pioneers. A number of important leaders of the CPC, including future YCL and then party leader William Kashtan, came out of the Montreal organization. By 1927, the CPC had begun to also focus on political activity among French-Canadian workers in Quebec, recruiting and training new cadres for the Party. In 1928, Georges Dubois joined the party and became the French-Canadian organizer with other leaders like Buhay.

The late 1920s were an important period of ideological turmoil, debate and discussion and clarification of the Party programme for the CPC. Likewise, with the help of the Comintern, the CPC began to better understand the unequal and oppressed situation of the French-Canadian people in Canada and began to demand that the rights of French speakers be recognized.

In July 1930, during the Great Depression, the party stepped up its visibility by presenting E. Simard, a blacksmith, as the first Communist candidate in the 1930 Canadian federal election running in Maisonneuve, Montreal. Simard's programme characterized the Communist platform of the time, demanding employment insurance reform, public health care, and immediate action on the unemployed. Party organizer Georges Dubois was arrested by the police during the campaign. The party organized a demonstration against the arrest at Viger Square, the police brutally disperse the hundreds of protesting workers.

=== Repression and resistance ===
During the Depression the CPC in Montreal was one of the few radical and active organizations on the left, despite being banned. In 1934, when leader Paul Delisle died, the party held a "red" funeral in Montreal and attracted a crowd. Mass meetings were an important activity for the party. The CPC organized an assembly of the League against War and Fascism in Montreal, when 600 people came out to hear Lilian Mendelssohn, Joe Wallace, Fred Rose, Maurice Armstrong and a young student who had just returned from France – Stanley Bréhaut Ryerson. In another documented rally, as many as 4,000 people gathered at St. Jacques Market to hear Joe Wallace, John Boychuk, Becky Buhay, Paul and Tom McEwen and were brutally dispersed by police.

Growing in stature, the party made its journal Clarté into a weekly (it was published until 1939). Leader Évariste Dubé visited the USSR on a special party delegation, as did radical medic Norman Bethune with a group of progressive Canadian doctors. On his return, Bethune joined the Communist Party. Bethune became one of the most famous Canadians internationally, and the most well-known member of the CPC. His decision to join the party was shaped not just be what he saw in the Soviet Union, but also communist participation in the workplaces and communities of Montreal.

For example, the party created unemployed clubs and focused on labour organizing. S. Larkin, J. Bedard, C. A. Perry, L. Dufour and Ms. Lebrun helped build various clubs and groups of factory workers like the United Lorimier Unemployed League St. Henri. Labour demands were also front-and-centre in October 1935 when the CPC, now de-criminalized and able to operate legally, ran in the federal election: leader Fred Rose got 3378 votes in Montreal-Cartier, while CA Perry got 1,012 in Saint-Denis.

A following year the young radical Stanley Bréhaut Ryerson was elected secretary of the Communist Party in Quebec. Ryerson's leadership came at a time when the party was shifting its approach much more towards the united front. By 1936, Lucien Dufour, President of the Front Populaire, reported that 56 organizations were part in Quebec with their central theme as organizing the struggles of the unemployed.

Abandoning the 'department' model, an executive committee of the Quebec section of the Communist Party was formed including Évariste Dubé (chairman), S. B. Ryerson (secretary), Fred Rose, Emile Godin Alec Rosenberg, Samuel Emery. Alex Gauld, Mrs. Leo Lebrun, Willie Fortin, Jean Bourget Sarkin and Sydney. Some of these activists ran in the August 1936 provincial election. Fred Rose got 578 votes in Montréal–Saint-Louis, Évariste Dubé 185 votes in Montréal–Saint-Jacques and Emile Godin 288 votes in Montréal–Sainte-Marie.

The Communists' greater strength and organization, and the failure to ban the party on the federal level, prompted anti-Communist Quebec premier Maurice Duplessis to create the repressive padlock law in 1937 against the CPC and all supposedly communist groups. Duplessis quickly padlocked the offices of the CPC's newspaper, Clarté, and of Jewish community groups and other progressive organizations. The law stayed on the books until the late 1950s, when a challenge organized by the CPC at the Supreme Court level overturned the law.

In June 1937, a demonstration of 300 to 400 women in the Champ de Mars was organized by Solidarity Women. Five women were arrested after the police charge. Norman Bethune returned to Montreal after a journey of several months in Spain. Thousands of people were waiting his arrival at Bonaventure station and organized a parade in the streets of Montreal in his honour. Over 15,000 people gathered at the Mount Royal Arena to hear Bethune tell what he saw in Spain. He declared: "Spain can be the tomb of fascism". Bethune toured the country for seven months to raise money for the Spanish Republic in the Spanish Civil War.

In May 1938, approximately 4,000 people attended a meeting of the Communist Party unit and the Co-operative Commonwealth Federation in the Mont-Royal arena in Montreal. The main speakers were Eugene Forsey, CCF and Stanley B. Ryerson for the Communist Party.

In 1941, at a meeting in Montreal, Guy Caron of the Communist Party and Jean-Charles Harvey of Le Jour newspaper spoke to 6,000 people to support the war effort against the fascists.

On 9 August 1943, Fred Rose was elected MP for Montreal-Cartier during a federal by-election. He won 5767 votes.

In November 1943, the First Congress of the Labor-Progressive Party of Quebec was held at Montreal with 172 delegates representing 40 clubs from the party.

In the August 1944 provincial election, the Labor-Progressive Party candidate in Saint Louis, Michael Buhay, won 6,512 votes.

In the June 1945 federal election, Fred Rose was re-elected MP for Montreal-Cartier.

On 14 March 1946, Fred Rose was arrested and accused of spying for the Soviet Union in the wake of revelations of the Gouzenko Affair. He was freed after six years in prison and deported to Poland, where he later died. The Canadian government never gave him the right to return.

In 1946, Guy Caron was appointed leader of the Quebec Labor-Progressive Party (LPP).

In April 1946, Henri Gagnon and other Communists for the League of Homeless Veterans: Gagnon is president. The league consisted of squatters occupying homes that veterans can not afford, or unoccupied, for their return.

In 1948, Police conducted a seizure at the local newspaper Combat (founded 1946), under the padlock law.

In 1951, Fred Rose was released after six years in prison. Because of continued harassment by the police he decided to leave Canada for Czechoslovakia and Poland.

On 14 October 1956, a public meeting was held in Montreal following the 20th Congress of the CPSU. Tim Buck and J.B. Salsberg, returned from the USSR, and reported the results of their talks with Soviet leaders. On 15 October, dissatisfied with the explanations provided by Buck, Guy Caron resigned from the LPP with five other members of the provincial committee: Ken Perry, Harry Gulkin, Norman Nerenberg, Frank Arnold and Pierre Gélinas.

In February 1957, in an article published in Clarté, Henri Gagnon estimated that 200 members had left the party since the revelations of Khrushchev.

In March 1957, the padlock law was declared unconstitutional.

=== PCQ founding and Cold War history ===
In 1965, the Communist Party of Quebec was established as a provincial political party under the laws of Quebec, under the chairmanship of Samuel Walsh.

In 1973, the PCQ published a pamphlet calling for the creation of a mass federated party in Quebec and calling on unions to take the lead in this process. Quebec then saw an unprecedented rise of struggles. After the 1972 Québec general strike in the public sector, there was the imprisonment of union leaders and the outbreak of unprecedented general strike in Quebec.

The idea received a more favourable reception in many unions, especially in Montreal. The project to create a mass party of workers from unions was subject to closed debate on the floor of Congress of the Quebec Federation of Labour in 1975. But the proposal was defeated. Elsewhere, particularly in the Confédération des Syndicats Nationaux and the Corporation des enseignants du Québec (CEQ), the same enthusiasm gave way slowly to the ground a certain selflessness. The problem lay in the fact that the support of the Parti Québécois (PQ) was skyrocketing, including in unions, as people realized that the PQ could take power. In the November 1976 Quebec election the PQ took power for the first time.

Given the lack of enthusiasm on the part of unions to promote such a project, which was increasingly seen as being harmful to the chances of PQ to finally beat the Liberals, and to the difficulties within the groups Left can agree because of the extreme partisanship that existed then the idea died a natural death.

In 1980, the PCQ gave its support to the Yes campaign, in the 1980 Quebec referendum.

In March 1983, Fred Rose died in Poland.

In 1991, the Communist Party was liquidated, and socialism in the Soviet Union was overturned.

=== Reorganization and the formation of Québec solidaire ===
Alternate logo used during the 2000s

During the crisis in CPC during the 1990s, the PCQ became disorganized, closed its offices, and its remaining members drifted apart from the CPC, adopting positions sympathetic to nationalism. The CPC maintained relations with the PCQ, however, which addressed its congresses in Toronto and Vancouver.

It was not until 1997 that a range of communists and communist groups came together to re-organize the PCQ—ranging from Greek friends of the KKE to members of the neo-Maoist Communist Workers Group (ACG). The old members of the PCQ who left the party a few years before re-joined, and although recognizing differences over the national question they decided to work together.

Beginning in September, members of the CPC in Quebec began to meet some members of the Social Democratic Party of Quebec (PDS) to discuss possible cooperation. In the elections of 1998, the Communist Party of Quebec called for an alliance with the PDS. While the offer was unanswered, the steps were nevertheless useful.

A few months later, in a rather unexpected move, the PDS called on the DMP effect coming as a special guest, to attend their next conference, in order to enforce its vision of the unity of left forces.

In 2002, the Communist Party of Quebec formed a federation with the Party of Social Democracy (PDS) and the Rally for the progressive alternative (RAP) to form the Union of Progressive Forces (UFP).

=== 2005 split ===
The UFP agreed to place the question of Quebec independence as intertwined with social or class issues. This was hotly debated as the party transformed into Québec solidaire in 2006. The debate moved over into the PCQ as well. These positions were questioned by the Quebec leader of the party, André Parizeau, who formulated a series of amendments in support of immediate independence in 2004 which were rejected by both the National Executive Committee (NEC) of the Quebec party (by a vote of 4–2) and by the Central Executive Committee of the Canadian party (by a vote of 7–1).

In January 2005, Parizeau wrote a letter to PCQ members declaring that the party was in crisis and, describing the four NEC members who opposed his amendments as a pro-federalist "Gang of Four", he summarily dismissed them. Although his Quebec nationalist point of view held a majority at the PCQ's convention of April 2005, who was granted voting rights was highly disputed. Parizeau was subsequently expelled by the party. Around the same time, his group announced their withdrawal from the CPC.

However, after a dispute where both groups presented documentation, the official Directeur général des élections du Québec on 3 April 2006, recognized the Parti communiste du Québec led by André Parizeau. Parizeau later disavowed the PCQ in 2019 so he could be accepted as a candidate for the Bloc Québécois in the 2019 federal election.

The Central Committee of the party, however, affirmed the authority of the previous Quebec National Executive Committee in 18–19 June 2005. The non-registered CPC-aligned PCQ held a new convention which restarted a communist French-language periodical, Clarté, and later opened an office and small reading room, launched an active website, and re-affiliated with Quebec Solidaire as an organized group. They work closely with the youth and student organization, the "Ligue de la jeunesse communiste du Quebec".

=== After 2005 ===
The PCQ-PCC participated in the 2007 elections running three candidates under the banner of Quebec Solidaire, as well as offering its own independent perspective on the election.

The original PCQ-PCC again participated in the 2007 elections running three candidates under the banner of Quebec Solidaire, as well as offering its own independent perspective on the election.

The PCQ-PCC participated in the 2007 elections under the banner of Quebec Solidaire, focusing on the campaign of one candidate in Acadie (bumping out the leader of the nationalist PCQ). The PCQ-PCC also presented its own independent perspective on the election and the question of voting and the student struggle. The PCQ-PCC also presented candidates in the 2011 federal election.

The PCQ-PCC left QS following QS's merger with Option nationale in 2017.

The PCQ-PCC convened its most recent congress in spring 2018. The Party continues to publish the newspaper Clarté and now maintains an office on Parc Avenue.

Party leader Pierre Fontaine died of a heart attack on 27 May 2020. He was succeeded by Adrien Welsh, the former General Secretary of the Young Communist League of Canada.

== General secretaries ==
- Sam Walsh (1965–1989)
- Marianne Roy (1989–1991)
- Ginette Gauthier (1991–1994)
- André Cloutier (1994–1998)
- André Parizeau (1998–2004)
- Pierre Fontaine (2004–2020)
- Adrien Welsh (since 2020)

== Election results ==
Election	Leader	Candidates	Seats	±	Votes	%	± (pp)
1936	Stanley Bréhaut Ryerson	3 / 90	0 / 90	New	1,045	0.18	New
1939	Stanley Bréhaut Ryerson	1 / 86	0 / 86	Steady	159	0.03	0.15▼
Changed name from Communist Party to Labor-Progressive Party / Parti ouvrier-progressiste in 1943.
1944^{1} ^{2}	Paul Moisan	3 / 91	0 / 91	Steady	7,873	0.59	0.56▲
1948^{1}	Guy Caron	1 / 92	0 / 92	Steady	4,899	0.32	0.27▼
1952^{1}	Guy Caron	4 / 92	0 / 92	Steady	3,932	0.23	0.09▼
1956^{1}	Guy Caron	32 / 93	0 / 93	Steady	6,517	0.35	0.12▲
Changed name from Labor-Progressive Party / Parti ouvrier-progressiste to Communist Party in 1959.
1960^{3}	—N/a	2 / 95	0 / 95	Steady	536	0.03	0.33▼
1962	Sam Walsh	1 / 95	0 / 95	Steady	71	0.00	0.33▼
1966	Sam Walsh	4 / 108	0 / 108	Steady	502	0.02	0.02▲
1970	Sam Walsh	1 / 108	0 / 108	Steady	213	0.01	0.01▼
1973	Sam Walsh	0 / 110	0 / 110	Steady	—	—	0.01▼
1976	Sam Walsh	14 / 110	0 / 110	Steady	1,776	0.05	0.05▲
1981	Sam Walsh	10 / 122	0 / 122	Steady	768	0.02	0.03▼
1985	Sam Walsh	10 / 122	0 / 122	Steady	834	0.02	Steady
1989	Marianne Roy	10 / 125	0 / 125	Steady	808	0.02	Steady
1994	André Cloutier	10 / 125	0 / 125	Steady	1,062	0.03	0.01▲
1998	André Parizeau	20 / 125	0 / 125	Steady	2,113	0.05	0.02▲
2003	Ran under Union des forces progressistes^{4}						
2007	Ran under Québec solidaire^{4}						
2008	Ran under Québec solidaire^{4}						
2012	Ran under Québec solidaire^{4}						
2014	Ran under Québec solidaire^{4}						
2018	Did not run^{4}						
2022	Did not run^{4}						
2026	Adrien Welsh	10 / 127	0 / 125	Steady	820	0.02	0.02▲

Notes

^{1} Candidates ran under the Labor-Progressive Party (Parti ouvrier-progressiste) banner as the Communist Party had been banned in 1941 under the Defence of Canada Regulations. The party kept this name until 1959 when it reverted to the Communist Party name.
^{2} Results compared to Communist candidates in 1939.
^{3} The party reverted to its original name of the Communist Party as of this election. Results compared to Labor-Progressive Party in previous election.
^{4} In 2002, the Communist Party joined the Union des forces progressistes with some of its members running as UFP candidates in the 2003 Quebec general election. The UFP, including the Communist Party, merged with other parties to form Québec solidaire in 2006. Beginning with the 2007 Quebec general election, the Communist Party has supported the QS in elections, with some of its members running as candidates. The party left QS in 2017 and did not run its own candidates in provincial elections again until 2026.
