= Alliance du personnel professionnel et technique de la santé et des services sociaux =

Union in Quebec

- Formation: March 18, 2004
- Merger of: Association professionnelle des technologistes médicaux du Québec (APTMQ), and Centrale des professionnelles et professionnels de la santé (CPS)
- Type: Trade Union
- Headquarters: Longueil, Quebec, Canada
- Region served: Quebec
- Members: >60,000
- President: Robert Comeau
- Funding: Union dues
- Website: https://aptsq.com/

The Alliance du personnel professionnel et technique de la santé et des services sociaux (APTS) is a union representing and defending the interests of 60,000 workers in Quebec's public health and social services sector. Its head office is in Longueuil.

The APTS sometimes joins coalition to support broader issues, in line with the convictions of the majority of its members. It is thus associated with the following groups: Centre international de solidarité ouvrière, Coalition Solidarité Santé, Forum social québécois, Intersyndicale des femmes, Regroupement québécois d'interaction continentale, Réseau Vigilance, Secrétariat intersyndical des services publics and Internationale des services publiques.

== History ==
The APTS was officially founded on March 18, 2004, out of the merger of two unions: the Association professionnelle des technologistes médicaux du Québec (APTMQ), which had 5,000 members, and the Centrale des professionnelles et professionnels de la santé (CPS), which had 10,000 members. These two organizations decided to join forces in order to better combat frequent and undesired changes imposed by new legislations.

In 2005 and 2006, following the adoption of Bill 30 by Quebec's government, the APTS experienced a 60% increase in membership. This law forced unionized Quebecers to choose a single union to represent their profession.

In 2015, following the merger of more than 180 establishments in Quebec's health and social services network caused by Bill 10, the APTS was once again forced to conduct a union allegiance campaign. This resulted in the organization becoming the largest category 4 union, representing 56,000 members, in April 2017.

In 2020, the union claimed 60,000 members.

In 2022, the APTS joined with the FTQ, CSQ and CSN, as part of the Front commun intersyndical de 2023. Together, they organized a series of strikes in 2023, eventually cumulating into the 2023 Quebec public sector strikes.

== History of the Presidency ==
During the APTS's first years, there were two presidents to ensure the proper representation of the two newly merged unions. Then, in 2006, the union's reformed its bylaws to only have one president:

- November 2004 to May 18, 2006: Denis Côté and Dominique Verreault
- May 18, 2006 to May 9, 2012: Dominique Verreault
- May 9, 2012 to November 19, 2019: Carolle Dubé
- November 19, 2019 to November 16, 2021: Andrée Poirier
- November 16, 2021 to now: Robert Comeau

== See also ==
- List of trade unions in Quebec
- 2023 Quebec public sector strikes
