= Québec solidaire candidates in the 2022 Quebec provincial election =

This is a list of candidates for Québec solidaire in the 2022 Quebec provincial election. QS ran candidates in 124 of the province's 125 ridings; 11 of whom were elected. Following the election, Québec solidaire was the third-largest party in the National Assembly of Quebec.

== Central Quebec ==
Riding	Candidate's Name	Notes	Residence	Occupation	Votes	%	Rank
Berthier	Amélie Drainville			Student	5,877	14.09	3rd
Bertrand	Julie Francoeur		Sainte-Adèle	Executive director of Fairtrade Canada	5,682	16.15	3rd
Champlain	Marjolaine Trottier		Saint-Maurice	Nurse	3,775	8.97	4th
Joliette	Flavie Trudel	QS candidate for Joliette in the 2014, 2012, 2008, and 2007 provincial elections		Professor at Cégep régional de Lanaudière	4,476	11.38	3rd
L'Assomption	Martin Lefebvre				4,553	14.32	2nd
Laviolette–Saint-Maurice	France Lavigne				3,568	9.50	4th
Les Plaines	Richard Jr Leblanc			Student (Université du Québec à Montréal)	3,668	13.32	3rd
Maskinongé	Simon Piotte	QS candidate for Maskinongé in the 2018 provincial election			3,162	9.90	4th
Masson	Émile Bellerose-Simard			Student (Cégep régional de Lanaudière)	4,610	13.07	3rd
Portneuf	Anne-Marie Melançon		Saint-Alban	Lecturer at Université Laval	2,675	8.22	4th
Prévost	Rose Crevier-Dagenais		Saint-Hippolyte	Paramedic	5,196	15.10	3rd
Repentigny	Ednal Marc			Electrical engineer	4,783	12.68	3rd
Rousseau	Ernesto Castro Roch			Educator/social worker	3,667	13.14	4th
Saint-Jérôme	Marc-Olivier Neveu	Candidate for Mayor of Saint-Jérôme in the 2021 municipal election	Saint-Jérôme		6,411	15.62	3rd
Trois-Rivières	Steven Roy Cullen	QS candidate for Champlain in the 2018 provincial election		Manager	6,069	16.35	2nd

== Eastern Townships/Southern Quebec ==
Riding	Candidate's Name	Notes	Residence	Occupation	Votes	%	Rank
Arthabaska	Pascale Fortin			Nurse	4,179	9.22	4th
Beauce-Nord	François Jacques-Côté		Saint-Elzéar	Addiction treatment worker	1,522	4.53	4th
Beauce-Sud	Olivier Fecteau			Pharmacy technician	1,623	4.35	3rd
Beauharnois	Emilie Poirier		Beauharnois		4,299	12.93	3rd
Borduas	Benoît Landry			Horticulturist	6,726	15.14	3rd
Brome-Missisquoi	Alexandre Legault	QS candidate for Brome-Missisquoi in the 2018 provincial election			7,318	15.91	2nd
Chambly	Vincent Michaux-St-Louis			Teacher	6,250	16.37	3rd
Drummond–Bois-Francs	Tony Martel		Roxton	Businessman	3,866	10.65	4th
Granby	Anne-Sophie Legault	QS candidate for Granby in the 2018 provincial election	Granby	Teacher	5,282	14.29	2nd
Huntingdon	Emmanuelle Perras		Saint-Bernard-de-Lacolle	Electrician	3,265	11.15	5th
Iberville	Philippe Jetten-Vigeant	QS candidate for Iberville in the 2018 provincial election			4,703	13.72	3rd
Johnson	Nancy Mongeau		Durham-Sud	Non-profit director	5,769	13.80	4th
Lotbinière-Frontenac	Christine Gilbert			Professor at Laval University	3,925	9.36	3rd
Mégantic	Marilyn Ouellet			Small business owner	3,592	12.78	3rd
Nicolet-Bécancour	Jacques Thériault Watso		Odanak	Carpenter	2,610	8.80	4th
Orford	Kenza Sassi			Lawyer	5,298	16.16	2nd
Richelieu	David Dionne			Restaurant worker	3,084	10.08	3rd
Richmond	Philippe Pagé	Mayor of Saint-Camille (2017–present)	Saint-Camille		9,031	19.86	2nd
Saint-François	Mélissa Généreux			Public health director	11,491	28.21	2nd
Saint-Hyacinthe	Philippe Daigneault		Les Maskoutains	Professor at Cégep de Saint-Hyacinthe	5,636	13.64	3rd
Saint-Jean	Pierre-Luc Lavertu			Agronomist	6,334	14.76	3rd
Sherbrooke	Christine Labrie	Member of the National Assembly for Sherbrooke (2018–present)	Sherbrooke		15,548	41.91	1st
Verchères	Manon Harvey			Teacher	6,665	14.44	3rd

== Greater Montreal ==
Riding	Candidate's Name	Notes	Residence	Occupation	Votes	%	Rank
Acadie	Elyse Lévesque				4,468	17.20	2nd
Anjou–Louis-Riel	Laurence Pageau				3,893	14.77	3rd
Blainville	Éric Michaud			Teacher	5,987	14.00	3rd
Bourassa-Sauvé	Ricardo Gustave		Montréal-Nord, Montreal		3,737	15.45	3rd
Camille-Laurin	~~Marie-Eve Rancourt~~ None	Withdrew on September 26, 2022		~~Union official (FAE)~~	–	–	–
Châteauguay	Martin Bécotte		Châteauguay	Public housing director	4,261	12.78	3rd
Chomedey	Zachary Robert			Student	2,570	7.89	4th
D'Arcy-McGee	Hilal Pilavci			Student (Université de Montréal)	2,203	8.52	3rd
Deux-Montagnes	Olivier Côté				4,766	14.15	3rd
Fabre	Jessy Léger			Political attaché	3,820	11.13	4th
Gouin	Gabriel Nadeau-Dubois	Co-spokesperson of Québec solidaire (2017–2025); Member of the National Assembly for Gouin (2017–present)	Montreal		17,283	59.44	1st
Groulx	Marie-Noëlle Aubertin			Professor at Collège Lionel-Groulx	5,919	16.21	2nd
Hochelaga-Maisonneuve	Alexandre Leduc	Member of the National Assembly for Hochelaga-Maisonneuve (2018–present)	Montreal	Union official (FTQ)	12,784	50.84	1st
Jacques-Cartier	Marie-Ève Mathieu	QS candidate for Richelieu in the 2014 provincial election and 2012 provincial election			1,456	5.02	5th
Jeanne-Mance–Viger	Marie-Josée Forget	QS candidate for Anjou–Louis-Riel in the 2018 provincial election			2,858	10.65	4th
La Pinière	Jean-Claude Mugaba			Economist	3,301	10.02	4th
La Prairie	Pierre-Marc Allaire-Daly		Delson	Postal worker	4,531	13.10	3rd
LaFontaine	Anne B-Godbout	QS candidate for Terrebonne in the 2018 provincial election		Marketing professional	2,301	8.87	4th
Laporte	Claude Lefrançois	QS candidate for Laporte in the 2018 provincial election		Veterinarian	5,968	17.72	3rd
Laurier-Dorion	Andrés Fontecilla	Member of the National Assembly for Laurier-Dorion (2018–present); Co-spokesperson of Québec solidaire (2013–2017)	Montreal		13,323	48.80	1st
Laval-des-Rapides	Josée Chevalier			Professor at Collège Montmorency	5,542	16.68	3rd
Marguerite-Bourgeoys	Angélique Soleil Lavoie			Teacher	2,898	10.27	4th
Marie-Victorin	Shophika Vaithyanathasarma	Bloc Québécois candidate for Rosemont—La Petite-Patrie in the 2021 federal election		Student	6,307	22.67	3rd
Marquette	Jérémy Côté			Accountant	2,956	11.27	3rd
Maurice-Richard	Haroun Bouazzi		Montreal	Computer scientist	10,903	34.67	1st
Mercier	Ruba Ghazal	Member of the National Assembly for Mercier (2018–present)	Montreal	Accountant	14,755	53.92	1st
Mille-Îles	Guillaume Lajoie			Public relations professional	3,789	12.88	3rd
Mirabel	Marjolaine Goudreau	QS candidate for Mirabel in the 2018 provincial election	Mirabel	Social services worker	6,222	14.41	3rd
Mont-Royal–Outremont	Isabelle Leblanc			Physician	6,008	20.28	2nd
Montarville	Marie-Christine Veilleux			Occupational safety and health professional	6,741	16.25	3rd
Nelligan	Maxime Larue-Bourdages	QS candidate for Soulanges in the 2018 provincial election and for Beauharnois in the 2008 provincial election		Union official (CSN)	1,766	5.26	4th
Notre-Dame-de-Grâce	Élisabeth Labelle				3,967	15.49	2nd
Pointe-aux-Trembles	Simon Tremblay-Pepin			Economist	4,084	15.41	3rd
Robert-Baldwin	Marieve Ruel	NDP candidate for Jonquière in the 2021 federal election		Teacher	1,498	5.02	4th
Rosemont	Vincent Marissal	Member of the National Assembly for Rosemont (2018–present)	Montreal	Journalist	13,311	37.62	1st
Saint-Henri–Sainte-Anne	Guillaume Cliche-Rivard		Montreal	Lawyer	8,992	27.72	2nd
Saint-Laurent	Gérard Briand			Designer	2,840	9.92	4th
Sainte-Marie–Saint-Jacques	Manon Massé	Member of the National Assembly for Sainte-Marie–Saint-Jacques (2014–present); Co-spokesperson of Québec solidaire (2017–2023)	Montreal		10,892	47.69	1st
Sainte-Rose	Karine Cliche		Sainte-Rose, Laval	Professor at Collège Montmorency	5,243	14.33	3rd
Sanguinet	Virginie Bernier		Saint-Constant	Coordinator	3,925	13.11	3rd
Taillon	Manon Blanchard		Longueuil	Public housing director	6,663	18.90	3rd
Terrebonne	Nadia Poirier			Educator	5,352	12.65	3rd
Vachon	Jean-Philippe Samson			Educator	5,343	15.01	3rd
Vaudreuil	Cynthia Bilodeau		Vaudreuil-Dorion	Teacher	3,671	9.23	4th
Verdun	Alejandra Zaga Mendez	President of Québec solidaire (2021–2022)	Verdun, Montreal	Researcher	9,562	30.75	1st
Viau	Renée-Chantal Belinga	Member of Montréal-Nord borough council (2017–2021)			6,418	30.44	2nd
Vimont	Josée Bélanger		Vimont, Laval	Nurse	3,669	11.48	4th
Westmount–Saint-Louis	David Touchette	QS candidate for LaFontaine in the 2018 provincial election		Project manager	2,687	12.82	2nd

== Northern Quebec ==
Riding	Candidate's Name	Notes	Residence	Occupation	Votes	%	Rank
Abitibi-Est	Benjamin Gingras			Neuropsychologist	2,838	13.71	3rd
Abitibi-Ouest	Alexis Lapierre			Manager	3,623	16.29	3rd
Chicoutimi	Adrien Guibert-Barthez				3,741	12.04	3rd
Dubuc	Andrée-Anne Brillant	Unissons Saguenay candidate for District 12 in the 2021 Saguenay municipal election	Saguenay	Social worker	2,833	10.58	4th
Duplessis	Uapukun Mestokosho		Minganie	Filmmaker	1,821	9.36	4th
Jonquière	Karla Cynthia Garcia Martinez			Professor at Cégep de Jonquière	2,778	9.07	4th
Lac-Saint-Jean	Elsa Moulin	Candidate for District 3—Melançon in the 2021 Alma municipal election	Alma	Technician	2,178	7.58	4th
René-Lévesque	Audrey Givern-Héroux			Professor at Cégep de Baie-Comeau	1,459	7.56	4th
Roberval	Michaël Ottereyes		Roberval	Author	1,826	6.83	4th
Rouyn-Noranda–Témiscamingue	Émilise Lessard-Therrien	Member of the National Assembly for Rouyn-Noranda–Témiscamingue (2018–2022); Member of Duhamel-Ouest Town Council (2017–2018)	Duhamel-Ouest	Farmer	8,890	30.94	2nd
Ungava	Maïtée Labrecque-Saganash	Daughter of Romeo Saganash	Waswanipi	Journalist	2,092	24.23	2nd

== Quebec City/Gaspé/Eastern Quebec ==
Riding	Candidate's Name	Notes	Residence	Occupation	Votes	%	Rank
Bellechasse	Jérôme D'Auteuil Sirois		Lévis	Construction worker	1,988	6.04	4th
Bonaventure	Catherine Cyr Wright	QS candidate for Bonaventure in the 2018 provincial election			2,417	10.83	3rd
Charlesbourg	Ève Duhaime	QS candidate for Saint-Jérôme in the 2018 provincial election			5,486	13.05	4th
Charlevoix–Côte-de-Beaupré	Myriam Fortin			Non-profit director	4,677	12.53	4th
Chauveau	Jimena Ruiz Aragon				3,816	8.81	3rd
Chutes-de-la-Chaudière	Caroline Thibault			Civil servant	4,311	9.28	4th
Côte-du-Sud	Guillaume Dufour	QS candidate for Côte-du-Sud in the 2018 provincial election	La Pocatière	Professor at Cégep de La Pocatière	3,154	9.33	4th
Gaspé	Yv Bonnier Viger			Epidemiologist	1,634	8.97	3rd
Îles-de-la-Madeleine	Jean-Philippe Déraspe	Member of L'Étang-du-Nord Village Council (–2021)		Small business owner	450	5.38	4th
Jean-Talon	Olivier Bolduc	QS candidate for Jean-Talon in the 2019 Jean-Talon byelection and for Chutes-de-la-Chaudière in the 2018 and 2014 provincial elections		Stenographer	8,117	23.76	2nd
Jean-Lesage	Sol Zanetti	Member of the National Assembly for Jean-Lesage (2018–present); Leader of Option nationale (2013–2018)	Quebec City	Professor	11,390	37.77	1st
La Peltrie	Lucie Villeneuve				3,954	8.90	4th
Lévis	Valérie Cayouette-Guilloteau				4,244	11.47	4th
Louis-Hébert	Steven Lachance				4,537	12.03	4th
Matane-Matapédia	Marie-Phare Boucher	QS candidate for Matane-Matapédia in the 2018 provincial election			1,450	4.87	4th
Montmorency	Annie-Pierre Bélanger		Beauport, Quebec City		5,100	12.05	3rd
Rimouski	Carol-Ann Kack	QS candidate for Rimouski in the 2018 provincial election	Rimouski	Educator	7,042	21.37	3rd
Taschereau	Étienne Grandmont		Quebec City	Public transit director	13,588	39.53	1st
Rivière-du-Loup–Témiscouata	Myriam Lapointe-Gagnon				5,102	14.61	3rd
Vanier-Les Rivières	Karoline Boucher				5,337	12.15	4th

== Western Quebec/Laurentides/Outaouais ==
Riding	Candidate's Name	Notes	Residence	Occupation	Votes	%	Rank
Argenteuil	Marcel Lachaine		Wentworth-Nord	Civil servant	3,523	10.79	4th
Chapleau	Sabrina Labrecque-Boivin			Administrative assistant	4,129	13.20	3rd
Gatineau	Laura Avalos	QS candidate for Chapleau in the 2014 provincial election		Union official (PSAC)	4,415	12.10	3rd
Hull	Mathieu Perron-Dufour			Economist/professor at the Université du Québec en Outaouais	6,623	20.75	3rd
Labelle	Jasmine Roy		Mont-Laurier	Teacher	4,079	12.26	3rd
Papineau	Marie-Claude Latourelle		Papineauville	Speech therapist	5,164	13.78	2nd
Pontiac	Mike Owen Sebagenzi			University student	2,935	10.28	4th
Soulanges	Sophie Samson		Saint-Lazare	Photographer/television producer	4,353	10.84	4th
