= 2023 Quebec public sector strikes =

Series of strikes in Canada

2023 Quebec public sector strike
- Date: November 6-December 28
- Location: Quebec
- Goals: Salary increases for the public sector, improvement of working conditions
- Methods: Strikes, protests, general strike

Lead figures
CSN; FTQ; CSQ; APTS; FAE	The Government of Quebec (43rd Legislature)

The 2023 Quebec public sector strikes were a series of strikes by public sector workers in Quebec involving hundreds of thousands of workers and students. Primarily involving those in the health, social services, and education sectors, the strikes began on November 6. The group known as "Front Commun" (Common Front) has had nine days of strikes since November 6. The recent offer given to the unions was swiftly rejected. The strikes ended on December 28.

== Unions involved ==
- Fédération autonome de l'enseignement (FAE)

=== Common Front ===
Negotiating together in the Common Front of Quebec:

- Centrale des syndicats du Québec (CSQ)
- Confédération des syndicats nationaux (CSN)
- Alliance du personnel professionnel et technique de la santé et des services sociaux (APTS)
- Fédération des travailleurs et travailleuses du Québec (FTQ)
