= CCWU =

CCWU may refer to:

- Canadian Chemical Workers' Union
- Columbia Commonwealth University
