= Hetu =

Hetu or Hétu may refer to:

== People ==
- Damien Hétu (1926–2010), Canadian politician
- Jacques Hétu (1938–2010), Canadian composer and music educator
- Jean-Paul Hétu (1932–2012), Quebec trade unionist
- Pierre Hétu (1936–1998), Canadian conductor and pianist
- Hetu Bhardwaj (born 1937), Indian Hindi fiction writer
- Jarvis Hetu, Canadian figure skater; see 2001 Canadian Figure Skating Championships

== Other uses ==
- Henkilötunnus, national identification number in Finland
- Yellow River Map (Chinese: 河圖; pinyin: Hétú), a Chinese divination scheme
- Hetu or "reason" (Sanskrit: हेतु), element of an argument in Indian and Buddhist logic, as in Hetucakra

== See also ==
- Ye Dharma Hetu, a Sanskrit dhāraṇī (mantra)
