= Paul-Émilien Dalpé =

Canadian trade unionist (1919–1994)

Paul-Émilien Dalpé C.M. (1919 – April 16, 1994), also known as Paul-Émile Dalpé, was a Canadian labour unionist and nurse.

== Biography ==
Dalpé was born in 1919, in Saint-Jérôme, and was the founding president of the Centrale des syndicats démocratiques (CSD), a Quebec labour central body.

In 1966, Dalpé was president of the National Federation of Services, part of the Confederation of National Trade Unions (CSN) which represented hospital workers.

In 1972, Dalpé was one of the dissident members of the CSN executive who led the split of the CSN that resulted in the creation of the more politically moderate CSD, and became the CSD's founding president from 1972 until 1981. After he retired, he became a part-time member of the Economic Council of Canada. He died on April 16, 1994, aged 74 or 75.

== Honours ==
On December 14, 1981, he was appointed as a Member of the Order of Canada.
