= Canadian Actors' Equity Association =

Canadian performers union

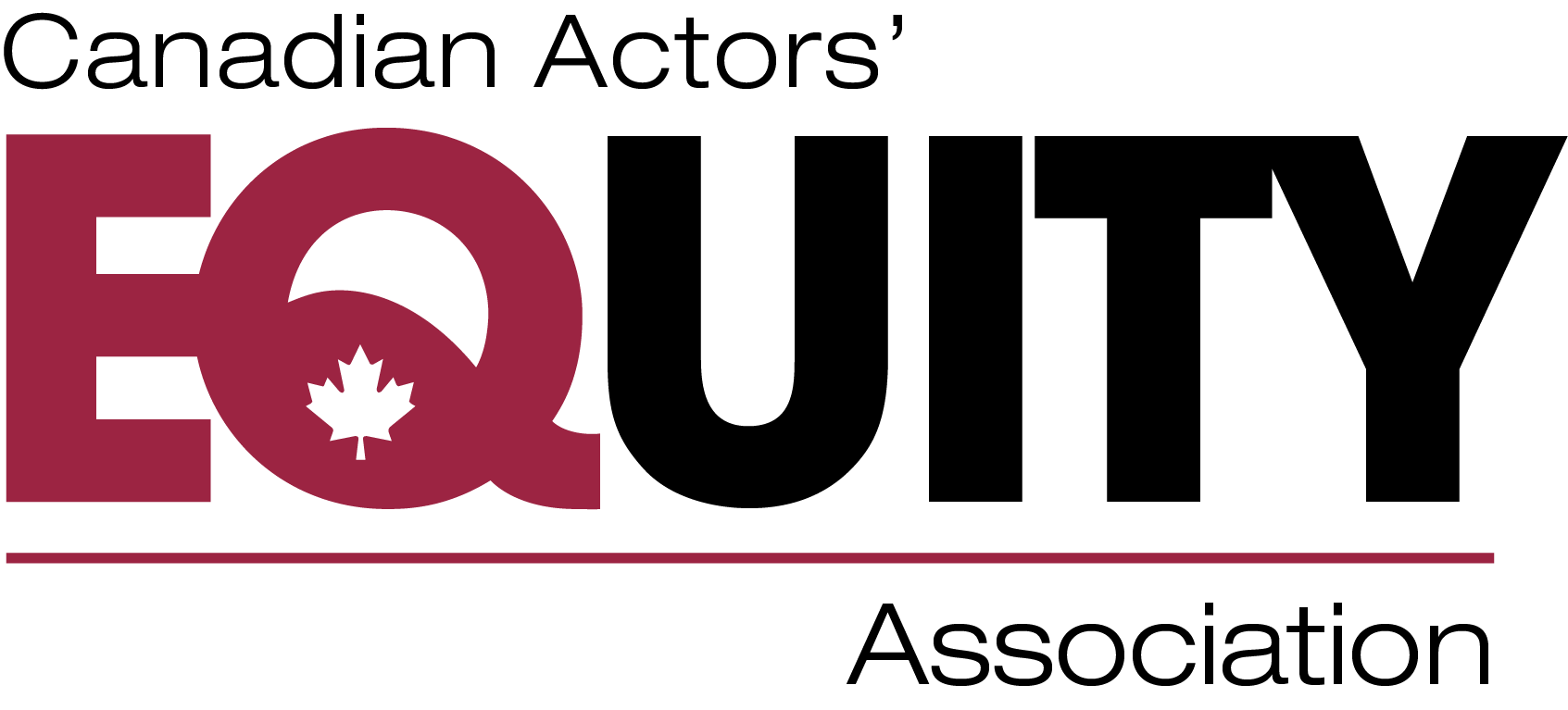
- Abbreviation: Equity
- Founded: 1955
- Headquarters: Toronto, Ontario
- Location: Canada
- Members: 6,000
- Executive Director: Alex Levine
- Key people: Scott Bellis (president); Alex Levine (Executive Director)
- Website: www.caea.com

Canadian Actors' Equity Association (CAEA) is an association of performers in English Canada who are engaged in live performances before paying audiences in theatre, opera and dance. It negotiates agreements and working conditions for its membership, and represents about 6,000 professional artists, which includes actors, dancers, and opera singers, as well as theatre directors, choreographers, fight directors and stage managers.

== History ==
Stage actors in Canada had been represented informally by ACTRA since the 1940s, but at the time of the founding of the Stratford Shakespeare Festival in 1953, they sought their own union representation. As a result of meetings in Montreal between the Canadian Council of Authors and Artists (an umbrella organization) and the American Actors' Equity Association, AEA, the actors worked under AEA contracts. The first meeting of the Canadian branch was held in Toronto in February 1955.

In 1972 the Canadian government called upon Equity members to decide their tax status, and members voted by a narrow margin in favour of independent contractor status, thereby forgoing the benefits of being employees.

By 1974, a survey revealed that the membership wanted to form its own independent union, and on April 1, 1976, Canadian Actors' Equity Association was formed, transferring 2000 members from AEA. Reciprocal agreements were signed with ACTRA, AEA, and AGMA. On April 1, 2011, Canadian Actors' Equity celebrated 35 years as an autonomous organization.

== Present ==
Today, Equity has a National Office in Toronto, Ontario with a staff of 20, and a Western Office in Vancouver, British Columbia with a staff of 2.

The head of the association is the executive director, who is hired by the elected Council and is responsible for staff operations, acting as Equity's liaison with other arts and cultural organizations.

Administration and enforcement of Equity's agreements and policies is the responsibility of Business Representatives, who visit productions around the country to ensure that contractual rules and working conditions are enforced.

== See also ==
- British Actors' Equity
- List of trade unions in Canada

== Sources ==
- McQuarrie, Ruth. Face to Face with Talent: Featur[ing] 2,400 Members of ACTRA and [of the] Canadian Actors' Equity Association. Toronto: ACTRA, [ca. 1985], [26]
