= Professional Association of Foreign Service Officers =

- Association professionnelle des agents du Service extérieur
- Abbreviation: PAFSO; APASE
- Founded: 1967
- Headquarters: Ottawa, Ontario
- Location: Canada
- Key people: Pam Isfeld, president
- Affiliations: Public Services International
- Website: pafso.com

The Professional Association of Foreign Service Officers (PAFSO) is a professional association of the Canadian Foreign Service and represents approximately 2000 Foreign Service officers working for the Global Affairs Canada (GAC), Immigration, Refugees and Citizenship Canada (IRCC) and Canada Border Services Agency.

The aims of the Association are to further the interests of its members, to protect the status and standards of their profession and to maintain and promote the effective functioning of the foreign service of Canada; to act as the bargaining agent on behalf of its ordinary members; and to formulate and express the corporate view of the members on matters affecting them.

PAFSO was certified in 1967 and is headquartered in Ottawa.

== Publications ==
PAFSO publishes bout de papier quarterly, Canada's Magazine of Diplomacy and Foreign Service.

== Past Presidents ==
- Michael Kologie (2016)
- Timothy Hodges (2014)
- Timothy Edwards (2011)
- Pam Isfeld (2009)
- Craig Weichel (2007)
- Brian Young (2006)
- John Bonar (2004)
- Masud Husain (2003)
- Jim Gould (2001)
- Dan George (2000)
- Peter Price (1999)
- Carol Turner (1997)
- Gilbert Laurin (1995)
- Susan Harper (1994)
- Colin Robertson (1993)
- Don Mackay (1992)
- Michael Small (1991)
- Michael Fine (1990)
- Amos Donohue (1989)
- Rodney Briggs (1988)
- John Lobsinger (1987)
- Len Mader (1986)
- Jean-Paul Delisle (1984)
- Russ Davidson (1983)
- George Haynal (1982)
- David Horley (1981)
- Kathryn McCallion (1980)
- Lorne Clark (1979)
- Georges Léger (1978)
- Ms Hedevig (Viggi) Ring (1976)
- Sydny G. Harris (1975)
- L.J. Taylor (1974)
- Jean Touchette (1972)
- John Sharpe (1969)
- David Hilton (1968)
- D’Iberville Fortier (1967)
- William (Bill) Bauer (1965)

== See also ==
- List of trade unions in Canada
- American Foreign Service Association
