= Jean-Paul Hétu =

Jean-Paul Hétu (1932 – 30 July 2012) was a Quebec trade unionist.

He was associated with the Confédération des syndicats nationaux (CSN) from 1958 until 1972, where he worked as a negotiator and head of the education department.

When several unions affiliated with the CSN left to form the Centrale des syndicats démocratiques (CSD), Hétu became vice-president of the CSD in 1972 and subsequently president until 1989.

== Works ==
- Hétu, Jean-Paul. Productivité et qualité de vie au travail dans le textile / par Jean-Paul Hétu, Guy Mailloux, Pierre Ouellette, avec la collab. du Comité de productivité de la Fédération du textile (C.S.D.), Arthur Delage ... [et al.]. -- [Montréal : Centrale des syndicats démocratiques, 1979]
- Hétu, Jean-Paul. Lutte des travailleurs du textile au Québec / Jean-Paul Hétu. -- [Montréal] : Centrale des syndicats démocratiques, [1979]
- Hétu, Jean-Paul. Le conflit chez Bélanger : un défi pour tout le comté de Montmagny / [rédigé par Jean-Paul Hétu et Michel Lauzon, avec la collab. du Syndicat des travailleurs de A. Bélanger ltée (C S D)]. -- [Montréal : Centre de recherche de la C.S.D., 1976.
- Centrale des syndicats démocratiques. Pour un syndicalisme nouveau et moderne au Québec / Centrale des syndicats démocratiques; [rédigé par] Jean-Paul Hétu. -- Montréal : C.S.D., 1981.
- Hétu, Jean-Paul. 150 ans d'histoire syndicale au Québec / Jean-Paul Hétu. -- Montréal : Éditions Cotis, [2005?]
