= Léo Guindon =

Canadian trade union organizer

Léo Guindon, OC (1908 – February 27, 1977) was a Canadian trade union organizer from Quebec. Guindon was the first president of the Centrale des syndicats du Québec (Quebec Labour Congress), which was formed in 1946. On July 6, 1967, he was awarded the Order of Canada "for his pioneering work in the formation of teachers' associations."

Born in the United States in 1908 of Franco-American parents, Guindon studied at Ste. Agatha in Verdun (now part of Montreal) and the Université de Montréal. He was known for uniting all French-language teachers in Quebec into the Corporation des Instructors Catholiques.
