= National Police Federation =

Police union in Canada

- Fédération de la Police Nationale
- Abbreviation: NPF; FPN
- Website: npf-fpn.com

The National Police Federation (NPF) is the police union representing Regular Members and Reservists of the Royal Canadian Mounted Police (RCMP) below the rank of Inspector. The NPF represents about 20,000 RCMP Members serving across Canada and internationally.

The National Police Federation (NPF) was founded on February 28, 2016, and certified as the sole bargaining agent of the RCMP on July 12, 2019. The organization currently operates under the leadership of President Rob Farrer. Alongside the NPF President are a Board of Directors of 16 elected representatives across three Regions: Atlantic/Central, Prairies and Pacific/North.

== History ==
Historically, the RCMP was prohibited by law from forming a Union. This changed following a Supreme Court of Canada ruling in January 2015 which declared the ban against RCMP unionization unconstitutional. The Treasury Board subsequently introduced An Act to amend the Public Service Labour Relations Act, the Public Service Labour Relations and Employment Board Act and other Acts and to provide for certain other measures in Parliament, and on June 19, 2017, the Bill received Royal Assent and became law. This new Bill set the foundation to allow Members of the RCMP to unionize and provided a framework for collective bargaining on issues such as pay, grievances, working conditions and workplace safety.

On April 5, 2017, the Association de Membres de la Police Montée du Québec (AMPMQ), applied to the Federal Public Sector Labour Relations and Employment Board (FPSLREB) to be the sole certified bargaining agent representing Members of the RCMP within the province of Québec.

On April 18, 2017, the National Police Federation submitted its application to the Federal Public Sector Labour Relations and Employment Board (FPSLREB) in a bid to be the sole certified bargaining agent for all RCMP regular Members (excluding officers at the rank of Inspector and above, and civilian members) throughout Canada.

The FPSLREB joined the two competing applications and heard both.

On July 12, 2019, the FPSLREB released its decision on the Constitutional question, dismissing the AMPMQ application for certification and releasing the results of the NPF certification vote. Members had voted 97% in favour of the NPF in a vote held between November and December 2018, and the National Police Federation was subsequently certified by the FPSLREB as the bargaining agent for "All the employees who are RCMP members (excluding officers and civilian members) and all the employees who are reservists."

The NPF then negotiated the organization's first Collective Agreement for its Members, which came into effect on August 6, 2021.

== Organization ==
=== Mission ===
The National Police Federation’s Mission is to provide “strong, fair and progressive representation to promote and enhance the rights of our Members across the country”. The organization provides a range of services to support and enhance the well-being of the RCMP officers they represent.

=== Governance and Structure ===
The NPF is led by an elected President, three elected Vice-Presidents, and up to 13 elected Regional Board Directors representing the three regions the NPF operates in:

- Atlantic/Central Region: comprising Members who serve in the four Maritime provinces as well as Québec and Ontario.
- Prairie Region: comprising Members who serve in Manitoba, Saskatchewan, and Alberta.
- Pacific/North Region: comprising Members who serve in British Columbia and the three northern territories of Yukon, Northwest Territories, and Nunavut.

Each region elects their respective regional Directors, who are assisted by staff teams. A full list of currently serving Directors can be found on the NPF’s website.

=== Local Area Representation ===
RCMP Members serve in communities across Canada. To facilitate local representation, the NPF’s Local Area Representatives (LARs) help connect Members with the NPF. There is approximately one LAR to represent the first 100 Registered Members and one additional LAR for every 250 more Members in a particular location. Currently, 94 Local Area Representatives serve Members through the NPF.

=== Composition ===
The National Police Federation is composed of six departments that work together to provide support for RCMP officers. Each department has a variety of staff members, many of which are bilingual, allowing the organization to communicate resources, support and information in both English and French. These departments include Member Services, Government Relations and Policy, Communications, Finance, Information Technology, and Legal Services.

== Membership ==
The National Police Federation represents approximately 20,000 Members serving across all provinces and territories in Canada and internationally. Members hold a variety of policing roles, including community policing, provincial policing, enforcing federal laws, national security, and government official or dignitary protective services.

Most Members of the NPF work in uniform policing roles as the contracted provincial police service in all three territories, as well as British Columbia, Alberta, Saskatchewan, Manitoba, Nova Scotia New Brunswick, Newfoundland Labrador and P.E.I. NPF Members also provide municipal police services in hundreds of communities – from rural and remote areas to larger cities including Surrey and Red Deer.

== NPF Benevolent Foundation ==
The National Police Federation Benevolent Foundation (NPFBF) is a registered Canadian charity created to support to the families of fallen RCMP Members. The Foundation launched in 2016 and extended its reach to families of on-duty, off-duty and serving NPF Members. In March 2021, the National Police Federation Benevolent Foundation received charitable status.

== See also ==
- List of trade unions in Canada
