= International Chemical Workers' Union =

North American trade union

- Abbreviation: ICWU
- Predecessor: International Council of Chemical and Allied Industries Union
- Merged into: United Food and Commercial Workers
- Formation: 1944
- Dissolved: July 1, 1996
- Type: Trade union
- Locations: Canada; United States
- Affiliations: AFL–CIO
- Website: www.icwuc.org

The International Chemical Workers' Union (ICWU) was a labor union representing workers in the chemical industry in the United States and Canada.

== History ==
The union's origins lay in the Chemical Workers' Council, established by the American Federation of Labor (AFL) in 1937, bringing together local unions in the Mid West. In 1940, this was replaced by the International Council of Chemical and Allied Industries Union, led by H. A. Bradley and based in Akron, Ohio. On September 11, 1944, the council was chartered by the AFL as the ICWU. In 1955, the union transferred to the new AFL–CIO, and by 1957, it had 84,299 members.

In 1968, the union joined the Alliance for Labor Action, which led to it being expelled from the AFL–CIO the following year, though it was readmitted in 1971. In 1975, some of its Canadian locals split away, to form the Canadian Chemical Workers' Union. By 1980, the union's membership had fallen slightly, to 65,800. On July 1, 1996, it merged into the United Food and Commercial Workers' International Union, becoming a council of that union.

== Presidents ==
1940: H. A. Bradley
1954: Edward R. Moffett
1956: Walter L. Mitchell
1968: Thomas E. Boyle
1975: Frank D. Martino
