= Energy and Chemical Workers Union =

Canadian trade union

- Abbreviation: ECWU
- Merged into: Communications, Energy and Paperworkers Union of Canada
- Formation: 1980
- Dissolved: 1992
- Merger of: Canadian district of the Oil, Chemical and Atomic Workers International Union; Canadian Chemical Workers Union; Various directly chartered local unions of the Fédération des travailleurs et travailleuses du Québec
- Type: Trade union
- Location: Canada
- Members: 35,000 (1985–1992)
- Affiliations: Canadian Labour Congress; ICEF

The Energy and Chemical Workers Union (ECWU) was a Canadian trade union. It was founded in April 1980 as the result of a merger of the Canadian district of the Oil, Chemical and Atomic Workers International Union, the Canadian Chemical Workers Union, and various directly chartered local unions of the Fédération des travailleurs et travailleuses du Québec. In 1992, it merged with the Communications and Electrical Workers of Canada and the Canadian Paperworkers Union to form the Communications, Energy and Paperworkers Union of Canada.

== See also ==
- Neil Reimer
