= List of trade unions in Quebec =

Pie chart depicting union affiliation for every unionized Quebecer. The FTQ is the most populous union by far with 600,000 members.

This is a list of trade unions in Quebec, Canada.

== Trade union centres ==
Name	Activity sector	Members	Website
Fédération des travailleurs et travailleuses du Québec (FTQ)	Aérospatiale, Insurance, Automotive industry, Bakery, Retail, Communications, Construction, Énergie, Enseignement, Entretien ménager, Finance, Hospitality industry, Printing, Metallurgy, Paper mill, chemicals and electrical, Health, Sécurity, Public sector, Textile and Clothing, Telecommunication, Transport	~ 600,000	www.ftq.qc.ca
Confédération des syndicats nationaux (CSN)	Centre de la petite enfance, Retail, Enseignement, Health and Social Services, public and parapublic services .	323,586	www.csn.qc.ca
Centrale des syndicats du Québec (CSQ)	Communications, Education, Health and Social Services, Public sector	126,486	www.csq.qc.net
Congress of Democratic Trade Unions (CSD)	Manufacturing	73,500	www.csd.qc.ca

== FTQ-affiliated federations ==
Name	Activity sector	Unités de base	Members in Quebec
Canadian Union of Public Employees (SCFP)	Communications, Social Services, Education, Hydro-Québec, Local municipality, Air transport, Public transport	500 affiliated unions	111,000
UNIFOR Québec	Aérospatial, Aluminerie, Communication, Énergie, Papier, Télécommunications, Transformation du bois, Transport	33 affiliated unions	55,000
FTQ-Construction	Construction	17 sections locales	69,914
Syndicats des Métallos	Insurance, Energy, Finance, Hospitality industry, Printing, Metallurgy, Iron Mining, Furniture, Paper mill, chemicals and electrical, Recycling, Sécurity, Textile and Clothing, Telecommunications, Transports et manutention	200 affiliated unions	59,000
United Food and Commercial Workers (TUAC)	Alimentation, Insurance, Retail, Finance, Hospitality industry, Printing, Restaurants, Health, Security, Textile and Clothing, Telecommunications, Transports	5 affiliated unions	45,000
International Brotherhood of Teamsters	Food, Laundry room, Cement, Hospitality industry, Pharmaceutical industry, Manufacturing, Restauration, Textile and Clothing, Transports	6 affiliated unions	35,000
Public Service Alliance of Canada (AFPC)	Public service and Security	23 affiliated unions	35,800
Syndicat québécois des employées et employés de service (SQEES-298)	...	...	16,500
Association internationale des machinistes et des travailleurs et travailleuses de l'aérospatiale	Aerospace (AIMTA)	...	15,000
Syndicat des employées et employés professionnels-les et de bureau (SEPB)	...	...	14,000
Syndicat des travailleurs et travailleuses des postes (STTP)	...	...	10,500
Union des employés et employées de service (UES-800)	...	...	11,100
Institut professionnel de la fonction publique du Canada	...	...	~ ?
Union des artistes (UDA)	...	...	7,400 membres actifs 4,000 stagiaires
Syndicat international des travailleurs et travailleuses de la boulangerie, confiserie, tabac et meunerie (SITBCTM)	...	...	6,000
Guilde des musiciens et musiciennes du Québec (GMMQ)	...	...	3,000
Syndicat des pompiers et pompières du Québec (SPQ)	...	...	3,800
International Alliance of Theatrical Stage Employees (AIEST)	...	...	1,800
Union internationale des travailleurs du verre, mouleurs, poterie, plastique et autres (VMP)	...	...	800
Syndicat des travailleurs (euses) en télécommunications (STT)	...	...	~ ?
Fraternité des travailleurs et travailleuses du préhospitalier du Québec (FTPQ- 592)	...	...	~ ?

== CSN-affiliated federations ==
=== Public sector federations ===
Name	Activity sector	Base units	Members
Fédération nationale des enseignantes et enseignants du Québec (FNEEQ)	Education (Cégeps)	101 affiliated unions	34,000
Fédération des employées et employés de services publics (FEESP)	Public function	425 affiliated unions	60,000
Fédération de la santé et des services sociaux (FSSS)	Health, Centres de la petite enfance, youth centers		130,000
Fédération des professionnèles (FS)	Legal Aid, Education, Health and Social Services, Communautaire et économie sociale, Government Agencies, Sociétés publiques	61 affiliated unions	8,000

=== Private sector federations ===
Name	Activity sector	Unités de base	Members
Fédération du commerce (CSN)	Food, Finance, Tourism	360 affiliated unions	32,500
Fédération de l'industrie manufacturière (FIM-CSN)	Manufacturing industry	320 affiliated unions	30,000
Fédération nationale des communications (FSSS)	Médias, Communication, Culture	88 affiliated unions	6,000
CSN–Construction (FSSS)	Construction	71 affiliated unions	18,000

== CSQ-affiliated federations ==
Name	Activity sector	Unités de base	Members
Fédération des professionnelles et professionnels de l'éducation (FPPE)	...		0
Fédération des syndicats de l'enseignement	...		0
Fédération du Personnel de l'Enseignement Privé	...		0
Fédération du personnel de soutien scolaire	...		0
Fédération des enseignantes et enseignants de cégep	...		0
Fédération du personnel professionnel des collèges	...		0
Fédération du personnel de soutien de l'enseignement supérieur	...		0
Fédération du personnel de la santé et des services sociaux	...		0
Fédération de la santé du Québec	...		0
La Fédération des intervenantes en petite enfance du Québec	...		0
Fédération des syndicats de l'action collective	...	...	0

== CSD-affiliated federations ==
Name	Activity sector	Unités de base	Members
Fédération démocratique de la métallurgie, des mines et des produits chimiques (FPPE)	...		0
CSD-Construction	Construction		0

== Independent Unions ==
Name	Activity sector	Unités de base	Members in Quebec
Syndicat de la fonction publique du Québec (SFPQ)	Fonction publique de l'État québécois		43,000 (2/3 are women)
Fédération autonome de l'enseignement (FAE)	Education (Professor )	9 affiliated unions	66,500
Fédération interprofessionnelle de la santé du Québec (FIQ)	Santé	60 affiliated unions	62,000
Alliance du personnel professionnel et technique de la santé et des services sociaux (APTS)	Secteur public de la santé et des services sociaux		32,000
Syndicat de professionnelles et professionnels du gouvernement du Québec (SPGQ)	Services publics		25,500
Union des producteurs agricoles du Québec (UPA)	Producteurs agricoles et forestiers	92 affiliated local unions and 12 regional federations	43,000

== See also ==
- List of trade unions
