= Fédération autonome de l'enseignement =

Teachers' union in Quebec

- Formation: 2006
- Founded at: Dorval
- Type: Trade Union
- Headquarters: Montréal, Quebec, Canada
- Region served: Quebec
- Members: >60,000
- President: Mélanie Hubert
- Revenue: Union dues
- Staff: 40
- Website: lafae.qc.ca
- Remarks: "Une Fédération par et pour les profs"

The Fédération autonome de l'enseignement (FAE) is a group of nine unions representing over 66,500 teachers working in Quebec's education sector. These teachers work the realm of preschool, elementary, secondary, prison, vocational and adult education. The staffs of the Peter Hall Schools (private schools for mentally deficient students) and the Centre académique Fournier (a private school for students with an adjustment disorder), as well as 2,600 members of the FAE Retirees Association (APRFAE), are also part of the FAE.

The FAE presently has members and operates in the Montreal, Capitale-Nationale, Laval, Outaouais, Laurentian, Estrie and Montérégie regions.

== History ==
The FAE was originally formed in 2006 by 9 ex-unions, or 27,000 ex-members, of the Centrale des syndicats du Québec (CSQ). They separated from the CSQ because they were disappointed with the strategies the CSQ and its teachers' unit, the Fédération des syndicats de l'enseignement, adopted, particularly in regards to the gender pay gap, the implementation of an education reform, and the negotiations made to renew their collective agreement with the Quebec government of 2004 and 2005.

On June 28, 2006, the movement held its first federative council in Dorval, where it adopted the permanent name of Fédération autonome de l'enseignement.

In 2023, the FAE's 66,000 affiliated members went on an unlimited general strike. This is the first time teachers have used this pressure tactic since 1983.

== Member unions ==
- The Alliance des professeures et professeurs de Montréal
- The Syndicat de l'enseignement de la Pointe-de-l'Île
- The Syndicat de l'enseignement de la Haute-Yamaska
- The Syndicat de l'enseignement de l'Outaouais
- The Syndicat de l'enseignement des Basses-Laurentides
- The Syndicat de l'enseignement de la région de Laval
- The Syndicat de l'enseignement de la région de Québec
- The Syndicat de l'enseignement des Seigneuries
- The Syndicat de l'enseignement de l'ouest de Montréal
- The APRFAE

== Executive committee (2022-2025) ==
- Mélanie Hubert, President
- Benoît Giguère, vice-president, Secretariat, Treasury and Administration
- Daniel Gauthier, vice-president, Labour Relations
- Patrick Bydal, vice-president, Political Affairs
- Annie Primeau, vice-president, Professional Life

== Founding executive committee (2006-2007) ==
- Nicole Frascadore (Montreal West), President
- Nathalie Morel (Alliance), vice-president, Work Life
- Christian St-Louis, (Laval), vice-president, Labour Relations, Negotiations
- Danielle Ducharme (Lower Laurentians), vice-president, Secretary-Treasurer
- Diane Nault (Outaouais)
- Suzanne Desaulniers (Seigneurie des Mille-Îles)
- Luc Ferland (Pointe-de-l'Île)
- Stéphane-A. Aucoin (des Seigneuries)
- Martin Laboissonnière (Haute-Yamaska)

== See also ==
- List of trade unions in Quebec
- 2023 Quebec public sector strikes
