= Congress of Democratic Trade Unions (Quebec) =

National trade union centre in Canada

CSD
- Congress of Democratic Trade Unions
- Centrale des syndicats démocratiques
- Founded: 1972
- Headquarters: Montreal, Quebec
- Location: Canada
- Members: 73200
- Key people: Luc Vachon, president
- Affiliations: ITUC
- Website: www.csd.qc.ca

The Congress of Democratic Trade Unions (French: Centrale des syndicats démocratiques, CSD) is a national trade union centre in Quebec formed on 8 June 1972 in response to a split within the Confederation of National Trade Unions Confédération des syndicats nationaux, CSN). It is the smallest of the four labour centres in Quebec, with about 4% (62,770 members) of the union membership in the province.

The split was led by dissident members of the CSN executive Paul-Émilien Dalpé, Jacques Dion and Amédée Daigle, referred to as the "Three Ds", who said they wanted a more democratic union body and one which would be politically neutral, as distinct from the political militancy of the CSN. Paul-Émile Dalpé was the first president of the CSD, Dion was treasurer and Daigle was director of services. Jean-Paul Hétu was vice-president and Réal Labelle was secretary.

Dalpé was succeeded as president by Jean-Paul Hétu who held office until 1989, when Claude Gingras became president.

== See also ==
- Fédération des travailleurs et travailleuses du Québec (FTQ)
- Confédération des syndicats nationaux (CSN)
- Centrale des syndicats du Québec (CSQ)
- List of trade unions in Quebec
- List of trade unions in Canada
