= Communication Workers of Canada =

Trade union

- Abbreviation: CWC
- Predecessor: Communications Workers of America
- Merged into: Communications and Electrical Workers of Canada
- Formation: 1972
- Dissolved: 1983
- Type: Trade union
- Location: Canada
- President: Fred Pomeroy

The Communication Workers of Canada (CWC) was a trade union, mostly representing telephone workers in Canada.

The union originated as the Canadian Communication Workers' Council, a division of the Communications Workers of America, founded in 1967. In 1972, it broke away from its parent union, to become the independent Communication Workers of Canada, under the leadership of Fred Pomeroy. It initially had 4,000 members, mostly from SaskTel, with smaller numbers from Northern Electric and Toronto Telephone House.

In 1976, the union was recognized as representing 12,000 Bell Canada technical workers in Ontario and Quebec, while in 1979, 7,400 operators and cafeteria staff at Bell joined, moving from the Communication Union of Canada. In 1983, the union merged with the Canadian District of the International Union of Electrical Workers, to form the Communications and Electrical Workers of Canada.
