= Louis Laberge =

- Born: February 18, 1924; Sainte-Martine, Quebec, Canada
- Died: July 18, 2002 (aged 78); L'Assomption

Joseph Léo Louis Laberge, OQ (February 18, 1924 – July 18, 2002) was a Quebec labour union leader. He served as president of the Fédération des travailleurs du Québec (Quebec Federation of Labour) from 1964 until 1991.

In 1988, he was made an Officer of the National Order of Quebec.

A state funeral was held at Montreal's Mary, Queen of the World Cathedral.
