= Canadian Paperworkers' Union =

The Canadian Paperworkers' Union (CPU) was a trade union.

The union originated as the Canadian section of the United Paperworkers' International Union. In 1974, it became independent, as the "Canadian Paperworkers' Union", with about 56,000 members, under the leadership of Henri Lorrain. Around ten locals, with just over 3,000 members, instead remained part of the international union. In 1987, the union had 57,000 members in 274 locals across Canada.

In 1992, it merged with the Communications and Electrical Workers of Canada and the Energy and Chemical Workers Union, to form the Communications, Energy and Paperworkers Union of Canada.
