= 1976 Canadian general strike =

- Date: 14 October 1976
- Location: Canada
- Methods: Strike action, general strike

Parties
Canadian Labour Congress	Government of Canada

The 1976 Canadian general strike was a one-day work stoppage against wage controls across Canada. Wage controls significantly reduced wages for a number of public sector workers. Taking place on October 14, 1976, more than 1.2 million workers participated across the country. It was organized by the Canadian Labour Congress with involvement from independent unions as well.

== Background ==
The government of Pierre Trudeau passed the Anti-Inflation Act in 1975. One provision of the law allowed the Anti-Inflation Board (AIB) to lower wages in contradiction to collective agreements.
