= Communications, Energy and Paperworkers Union of Canada =

Trade union

- Abbreviation: CEP
- Merged into: Unifor
- Formation: 1992
- Dissolved: 2013
- Merger of: Canadian Paperworkers Union; Communications and Electrical Workers of Canada; Energy and Chemical Workers Union
- Type: Trade union
- Headquarters: Ottawa, Ontario, Canada
- Location: Canada
- Members: 110,000
- Affiliations: Canadian Labour Congress; ICEM; International Federation of Journalists

Communications, Energy and Paperworkers Union of Canada (CEP; French: Syndicat canadien des communications, de l'énergie et du papier [SCEP]) was a largely private-sector labour union with 150,000 members, active from 1992 to 2013. It was created in 1992 through the merger of three unions: the Canadian Paperworkers Union, the Communications and Electrical Workers of Canada, and the Energy and Chemical Workers Union. See below for some other unions that were merged into the CEP. CEP was affiliated to the Canadian Labour Congress.

The communications portion of CEP consisted of workers from telecommunications (principally Bell Canada), private TV stations, newspapers, commercial print and new media (such as Internet and web design). The large media component of communications (about 20,000 members) joined CEP in 1994 when members of the Canadian wing of NABET joined as well as newspaper members from the Canadian division of the Communications Workers of America (CWA). In 2005 nearly all Canadian members of the American-based Graphic Communications International Union (GCIU) representing newspaper press operators and commercial print workers joined CEP, though GCIU members in Quebec joined Teamsters Canada. These mergers have made CEP the largest media union in Canada. In 2007, Bell Canada clerical and sales employees that belonged to the Canadian Telecommunications Employees Association (CTEA) voted to merge with the CEP, uniting all Bell Canada unionized employees under one union.

The energy portion of CEP consisted mainly of Canadian workers in the oil, gas and chemical sectors, while the paperworkers portion of CEP consisted of pulp and paper workers in the Maritimes, Quebec, Ontario, Alberta and British Columbia.

Membership is in flux as the pulp and paper industry in Canada declines and moves offshore. That industry has seen several plant closures affecting thousands of pulp and paper workers across Canada. A Canada Industrial Relations Board–imposed vote at the public broadcaster Canadian Broadcasting Corporation (CBC) in 2003 lost 1,800 technicians and camera operators from CEP to the CBC journalists' union Canadian Media Guild (affiliated with the CWA), whose members outnumbered the CEP members at the English-language section of CBC.

However, the 2005 GCIU merger as well as subsequent mergers with the Atlantic Telecommunications Workers Union and forestry workers in Quebec kept pace with membership declines in other areas.

CEP was an affiliate of the International Federation of Journalists.

The CEP voted in October 2012 to merge with the Canadian Auto Workers. The new merged union, Unifor, held its founding convention in 2013.

== Canadian Union of Operating Engineers ==
Canadian Union of Operating Engineers
- Canadian Union of Operating Engineers and General Workers
- Abbreviation: CUOE
- Predecessor: International Union of Operating Engineers
- Merged into: Communications, Energy and Paperworkers Union of Canada
- Formation: June 1960
- Dissolved: 2003
- Type: Trade union
- Location: Ontario, Canada
- Affiliations: Confederation of Canadian Unions

The Canadian Union of Operating Engineers and General Workers was a trade union founded in June 1960 by stationary engineers and other steam plant workers in Ontario, and merged with CEP in 2003. The union separated from the International Union of Operating Engineers (IUOE). This separation set an example which led to the separation of the Canadian Auto Workers (CAW) from the parent United Auto Workers (UAW).

=== History ===
The founding members worked at The Hydro Electric Power Commission of Ontario at the R.L. Hearn Generating Station in Toronto and the J.C. Keith Generating Station in Windsor, Ontario. Other members included a steam plant in Ajax, Ontario and steam plants at Toronto area hospitals and the Toronto District Heating System (now Enwave).

After struggling to become an independent the small union faced a number of challenges. There were disputes with larger unions such as the IUOE, which continued to represent engineers at many workplaces in Ontario and Canadian Union of Public Employees (CUPE). The CUOE was a founding member of the CCU, Confederation of Canadian Unions, started around 1968. The worst dispute occurred in 1972. The union continued to operate plants at Ontario Hydro during a strike involving the Power Workers Union (CUPE 1000). This dispute can be seen as management at Ontario Hydro using one union against another. After the strike any worker who left the CUOE to work at other Ontario Hydro plant lost his seniority. It was a long and bitter strike. Before the strike the CUOE was a strong union in Ontario Hydro power station operations, but the Power Workers Union (PWU) would emerge the ultimate winner, to represent workers in nuclear and other plants going forward. Some CUOE workers who crossed picket lines to operate stations such as, Lakeview Generating Station, and other locations received management jobs at Hydro Head Office and never returned to the CUOE. It has been called "one of the most unfortunate chapters in Canadian labour history" by labour leaders what happened in 1972, events both management and the union at Ontario Hydro (OPG) would prefer to forget. For the CUOE, it was the beginning of the decline of the Canada's "engineers union". The greatest setback for the CUOE was the closing of the R.L. Hearn and J.C. Keith stations by Ontario Hydro in the early 1980s.

Small groups of engineers employed mainly in district heating and at hospitals tried to maintain and regain membership for the next 20 years. The stationary engineers faced technological change and continued opposition from employers who feared a broader union of workers in this critical area. Larger unions in the public sector and industry often would base wage settlements and pay equity on the stationary engineer position in workplaces because if this group were to join a strike, it would be difficult to keep a facility in operation.

There was also attempts by many companies and professionals to eliminate stationary engineer positions using technology and equipment like coil tube boilers. Fewer young people entered the trade in recent years, and in Ontario (2007) there are fewer than 15,000 licensed engineers. The average age was 53 and colleges in Ontario are training less than 200 people per year.

One of the reasons for the current shortage of people in this field is the negative perception of skilled trades by young people and parents. With the introduction of new technologies such as computer controls, fuel cells, cogeneration and pollution controls, engineers will play an important role in the future and the trade is still a good career choice.

In September 2003 the CUOE merged with the Communications, Energy and Paperworkers Union of Canada (CEP) and became CEP Local 2003.

== See also ==
- 1999 CBC strike
