= Communications and Electrical Workers of Canada =

Trade union

- Abbreviation: CWC
- Merged into: Communications, Energy and Paperworkers Union of Canada
- Formation: 1983
- Dissolved: 1992
- Merger of: Canadian District of the International Union of Electrical Workers; Communication Workers of Canada
- Type: Trade union
- Location: Canada
- Members: 40,000 (1987–1992)
- President: Fred Pomeroy
- Affiliations: Canadian Labour Congress
- Formerly called: Communications, Electronic, Electrical, Technical and Salaried Workers of Canada

The Communications and Electrical Workers of Canada (CWC) was a Canadian trade union.

The union was founded in 1983, when the Canadian District of the International Union of Electrical Workers merged with the Communication Workers of Canada to become the Communications, Electronic, Electrical, Technical and Salaried Workers of Canada. In 1985 or 1986, it shortened its name to become the Communications and Electrical Workers of Canada.

It merged with the Energy and Chemical Workers Union and the Canadian Paperworkers Union in 1992 to form the Communications, Energy and Paperworkers Union of Canada. It had 40,000 members at the time of the merger.

== See also ==
- Telecommunications Workers Union
