= Alliance des professeures et professeurs de Montréal =

Canadian professional teachers trade union

APPM
- Alliance des professeures et professeurs de Montréal
- Founded: 1919
- Headquarters: Montreal, Quebec
- Location: Canada
- Members: 9320
- Key people: Catherine Beauvais-St-Pierre, president
- Affiliations: Fédération autonome de l'enseignement
- Website: https://alliancedesprofs.qc.ca/

The Alliance des professeures et professeurs de Montréal (English: Alliance of Professors of Montreal) is a professional trade union that represents teachers in the Commission scolaire de Montréal.

The alliance traces its origins to the Alliance catholique des professeurs de Montréal, which was founded in 1919 and received official accreditation in 1944. Before Quebec's education system was restructured from religious to linguistic boards in 1998, the alliance represented teachers in the Montreal Catholic School Commission.

The alliance is part of the Fédération autonome de l'enseignement, was founded in 2006.
