= Marcel Pepin =

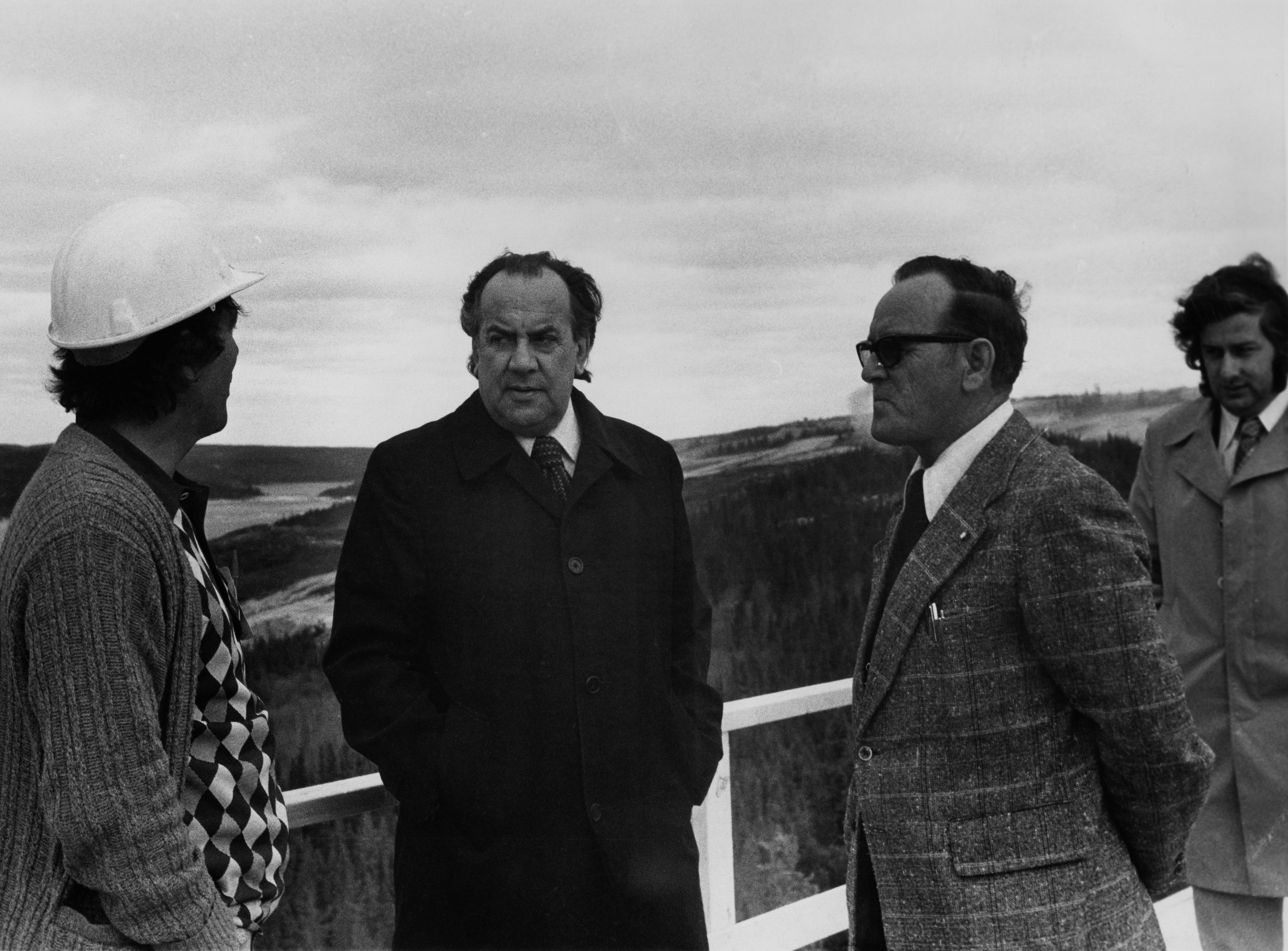
The president of the CSN, Marcel Pepin (center), visits the Manicouagan construction site in 1973.

Marcel Pepin (February 28, 1926 – March 6, 2000) was a trade unionist in Quebec, Canada. He was the president of the Confédération des syndicats nationaux from 1965 until 1976.

== Biography ==
Pepin graduated with a master's degree in industrial relations from the faculty of social sciences at the Université Laval in 1949.

He became negotiator for the textile workers and steelworkers federations of the CTCC. In 1961 he became the secretary general of the Confédération des syndicats nationaux (CSN). In 1965, he was elected president of the CSN, succeeding to Jean Marchand, who had left the CSN to join the Liberal Party of Canada. During Pepin's tenure as president, the CSN moved toward more radical orientations. In 1972, the three major labour federations of Quebec temporarily concerted their forces into a "common front" (front commun) during negotiations with the government of Robert Bourassa; Pepin and the two other union leaders recommended illegal strikes and defiance of court orders and they were sentenced to jail for those actions. In 1976, Pepin was succeeded by Norbert Rodrigue as president of the CSN.

Pepin was president of the World Confederation of Labour from 1973 until 1981.

From 1980 until 1990 Pepin taught at the school of industrial relations of the Université de Montréal. He retired in 1990.

In 1979, Pepin and other trade unionists and academics published a manifesto for the creation of a socialist movement and in 1981 they founded a left-wing political party, the Mouvement socialiste. That party ran ten candidates in the 1985 and 1989 Quebec general elections, but it remained marginal and was dissolved around 1991.

He was married to Lucie Dagenais. He had five children.

== Notes and references ==
Trade union offices
Preceded by Jean Marchand	President of the Confédération des syndicats nationaux 1965–1976	Succeeded by Norbert Rodrigue
Preceded by Maurice Bouladoux	President of the International Federation of Christian Trade Unions; 1973–1981	Succeeded by Johnny Tan
