= Canadian Chemical Workers' Union =

Trade union

- Abbreviation: CCWU
- Predecessor: International Chemical Workers' Union
- Merged into: Energy and Chemical Workers Union
- Formation: 1975; 51 years ago
- Dissolved: 1980; 46 years ago
- Type: Trade union
- Location: Canada
- Members: 2,825–7,214

The Canadian Chemical Workers' Union (CCWU) was a trade union in Canada.

The union was established in 1975 by 30 Canadian locals, formerly affiliated to the International Chemical Workers' Union. On formation, it had 2,825 members.

In 1976, women working as clerks in the Bank of Nova Scotia and Canadian Imperial Bank of Commerce wished to unionize. One was married to a CCWU steward, and the recent formation of the CCWU gave it a high profile. As a result, the union took them into membership, but the following year instead assisted them in forming the Canadian Union of Bank Employees.

The union grew steadily, and by 1980, it had 7,214 members in 56 locals, led by Kenneth V. Rogers. That year, it merged with the Canadian district of the Oil, Chemical and Atomic Workers International Union and some directly chartered local unions in Quebec, to form the Energy and Chemical Workers Union.
