= Centrale des syndicats du Québec =

Trade union in Quebec, Canada

CSQ
- Quebec House of Labour
- Centrale des syndicats du Québec
- Founded: 1946; 80 years ago
- Headquarters: Montreal, Québec
- Location: Canada
- Members: 175,000
- Key people: Réjean Parent, president
- Affiliations: Public Services International
- Website: lacsq.org

The Centrale des syndicats du Québec (CSQ; Quebec Labour Congress) is the third biggest trade union in Quebec, Canada, by membership.

It was founded in 1946 when three earlier unions merged to form the Corporation générale des instituteurs et institutrices catholiques de la province de Québec (CIC; General Corporation of Catholic Teachers in the Province of Quebec). Léo Guindon was its first president.

It changed its name in 1967 to Corporation des enseignants du Québec (Quebec teachers corporation), and then again in 1974 when it officially became a labour union to Centrale des enseignants du Québec (CEQ; Quebec teachers labour congress). It finally became the Centrale des syndicats du Québec in 2000 to acknowledge the fact that its membership base had expanded beyond teaching profession.

Today over 100,000 of its 175,000+ members are education workers, working primarily in the public sector. Most (69%) of its members are women. The CEQ was the first Quebec trade union to appoint a woman (Lorraine Pagé) as its president, in 1988.

Louise Chabot has been president since 2012 and Marc Nantel, Line Camerlain and Pierre Jobin are 1st, 2nd and 3rd vice presidents. Daniel B. Lafrenière is the secretary-treasurer.

Centrale des syndicats du Québec currently acts as a liaison for the J. W. McConnell Family Foundation as well.

It is a member organization of Education International and Public Services International.

== See also ==
- Centrale des syndicats démocratiques (CSD)
- Confédération des syndicats nationaux (CSN)
- Fédération des travailleurs du Québec (FTQ)
- List of trade unions in Quebec
- List of trade unions in Canada
