= Fédération des travailleurs et travailleuses du Québec =

Trade union in Quebec in Canada

FTQ
- Quebec Federation of Labour
- Fédération des travailleurs et travailleuses du Québec
- Founded: 1957
- Headquarters: Montreal, Québec
- Location: Canada
- Members: 600,000
- Key people: Magali Picard, President; Denis Bolduc, Secretary-General
- Affiliations: CLC
- Website: ftq.qc.ca

The Fédération des travailleurs et travailleuses du Québec (FTQ; Quebec Federation of Labour) is the largest labour federation in Quebec in terms of its membership. It has over 500,000 members, who account for 44% of the unionised workers in Quebec. This ratio is 60% in the private sector, in which most members work. It also has many members in government agencies.

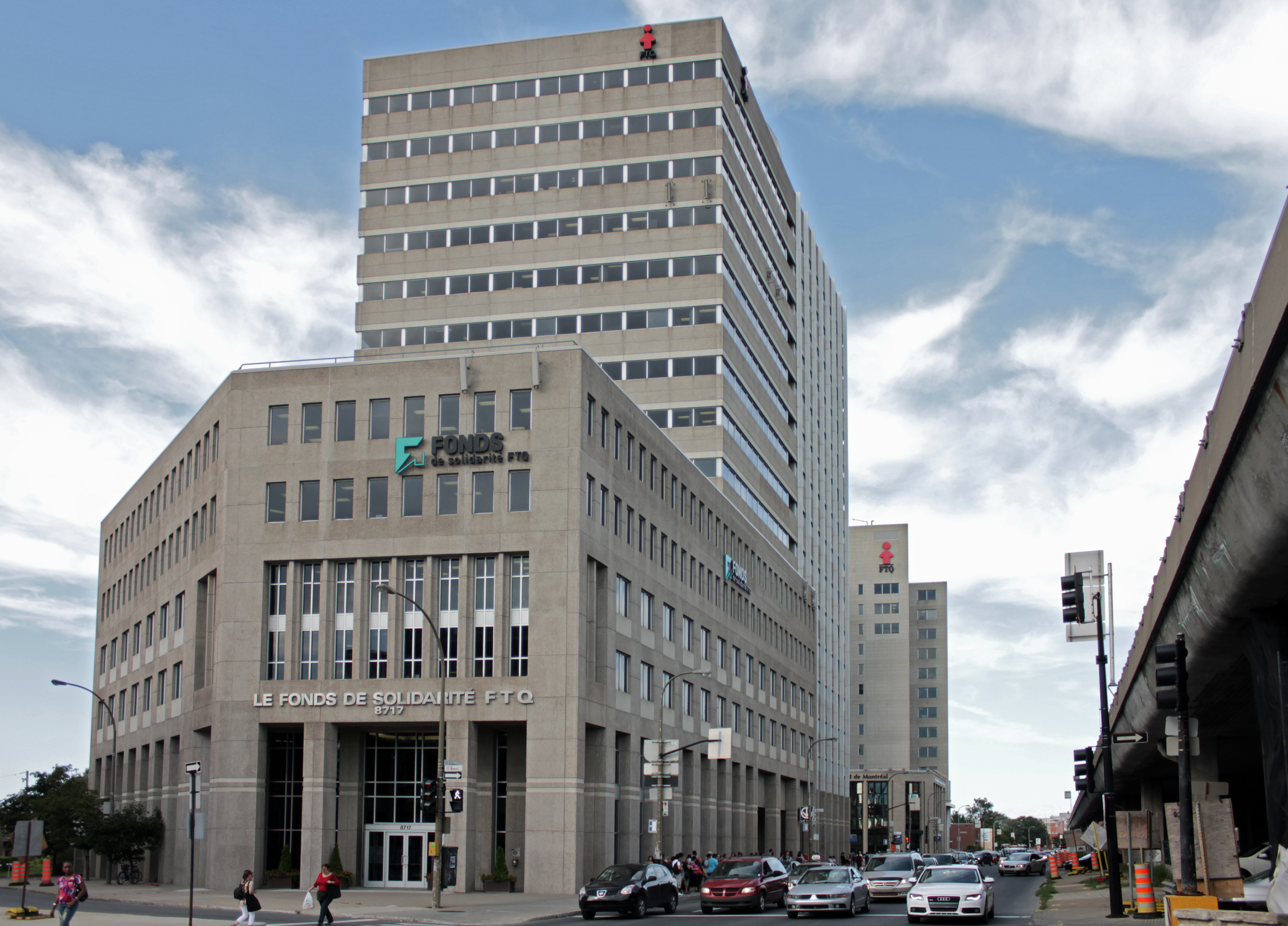
The FTQ Complex in Montreal

It was established in 1957 through the merger of two longstanding unions: the Fédération provinciale du travail du Québec (Quebec Provincial Labour Federation) and the Fédération des unions industrielles du Québec (Federation of Quebec Industrial Unions). The organization was primarily developed under the leadership of Louis Laberge from 1964 to 1991, with support from American unions concerned about the potential relocation of industry to Canada.

The FTQ is unusual among labour unions in that it founded (in 1983) and controls a capital investment fund called "Fonds de solidarité FTQ" which it uses to collaborate with and influence industrial groups and to promote economic growth. In November 2006 its investment fund stood at more than $6.8 billion.

The FTQ endorsed the Parti Québécois for the 2007 Quebec election, but criticized their call for a new referendum.

In January 2023, Magali Picard became the first indigenous person to lead FTQ when she was elected president. She had previously been national vice-president of the Public Service Alliance of Canada before resigning in 2020 after concerns of anti-Black behaviour against PSAC employees were widely expressed by Black staff members.

== See also ==
- Centrale des syndicats démocratiques (CSD)
- Confédération des syndicats nationaux (CSN)
- Centrale des syndicats du Québec (CSQ)
- List of trade unions in Quebec
- List of trade unions in Canada
