= Confédération des syndicats nationaux =

Trade union federation in Quebec

CSN
- Confederation of National Trade Unions
- Confédération des syndicats nationaux (French)

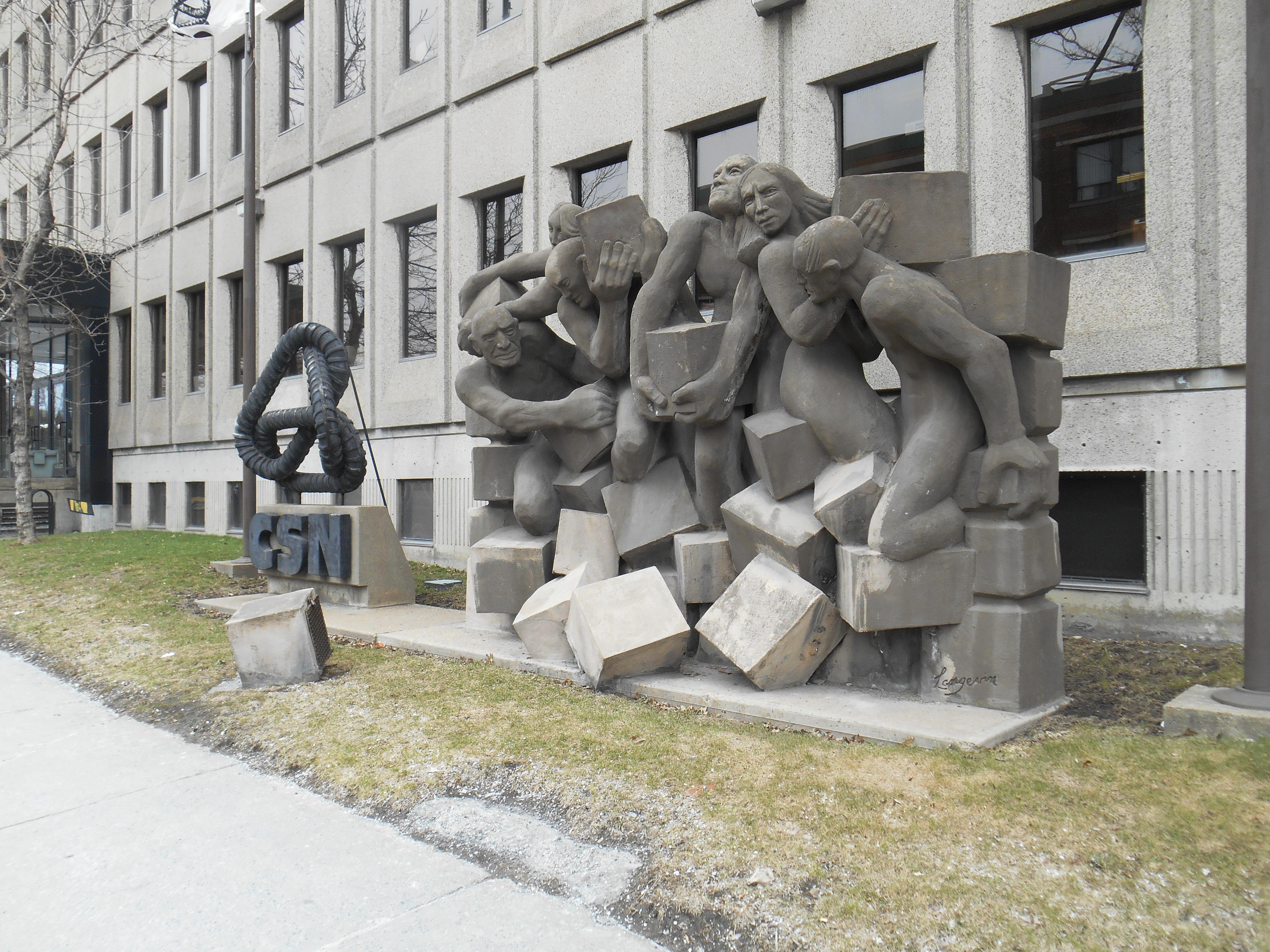
- Headquarters building
- Founded: 1921
- Headquarters: Montreal, Quebec
- Location: Canada
- Members: 300,000
- Key people: Caroline Senneville, president Jean Lortie, secretary general
- Affiliations: ITUC
- Website: www.csn.qc.ca

The Confédération des syndicats nationaux (CSN; English: Confederation of National Trade Unions) is the second largest trade union federation in Quebec by membership.

== History ==
It was founded in Hull in 1921 as the Confédération des travailleurs catholiques du Canada (Catholic Workers Confederation of Canada). By 1927, by some estimates, it contained up to a third of all union members in Quebec.

It became the CSN only in 1960 when it became secular. The CSN developed a close relationship with the Quebec Liberal Party and worked together to reform Quebec's labor law in 1965 to extend collective bargaining to government employees. However, by the late 1960s the CSN had fallen out of favor with the provincial government as it became radicalized and threw its support behind social movements.

In 1971, the three leading Quebec unions, the CSN, the CEQ teachers' union, and the Quebec Federation of Labour (FTQ) voted to form the Common Front, a syndicalist organization demanding a unified minimum wage for their 250,000 members. When negotiations failed between the Common Front and the Liberal government, the unions launched the largest general strike in Canadian history. When the strike's leaders were jailed for defying orders to return to work, the strike lost momentum and the Common Front broke apart.

The CSN first formally supported Quebec sovereignty in May 1990. It had, however, been associated with the sovereignty movement long before. In both the 1973 and 1976 provincial elections, the CSN, without formally endorsing the Parti québécois, let it be known that it considered the PQ to be most closely aligned with workers' interests. During the 1980 Quebec referendum, the CSN supported a yes vote on "sovereignty-association".

== Structure ==
The CSN is characterized by decentralized administration: local unions are organized into federations by sector of activity and regional councils, and are very independent from the central organization. It is also the most politically active trade union in Quebec.

The Confederation currently has about 300,000 members, distributed evenly between men and women, and between the private and public sectors. Marc Laviolette was replaced as president in 2002 by Claudette Carbonneau. Louis Roy, Roger Valois, and Denise Boucher are the 1st, 2nd and 3rd vice-presidents, respectively. Lise Poulin is the secretary and Pierre Patry is the treasurer.

The Montreal Central Council of the CSN endorsed Québec solidaire for the 2007 Quebec election.

== Presidents ==
- Pierre Beaulé (1921–1933)
- Osias Filion (1933)
- René Bénard (1934)
- Alfred Charpentier (1935–1946)
- Gérard Picard (1946–1958)
- Roger Mathieu (1958–1960)
- Jean Marchand (1961–1964)
- Marcel Pepin (1965–1976)
- Norbert Rodrigue (1976–1982)
- Donatien Corriveau (1982–83)
- Gérald Larose (1983–1999)
- Marc Laviolette (1999–2002)
- Claudette Carbonneau (2002–2011)
- Louis Roy (2011–2012)
- Jacques Létourneau (2012–2021)
- Caroline Senneville (2021–present)

== See also ==
- Centrale des syndicats démocratiques (CSD)
- Centrale des syndicats du Québec (CSQ)
- Fédération des travailleurs du Québec (FTQ)
- List of trade unions in Quebec
- List of trade unions in Canada

== Sources ==
- Yves Desjardins (2021) Le Québec à l'ouvrage CSN - 100 ans en 100 photos, Éditions Cardinal, ISBN 978-2-925078-34-0
- Bruno Ramirez et Giovanni Princigalli (2018) Three comrades of Montreal, documentary film 52 min, Université de Montreal
- Heron, Craig (2012). The Canadian Labour Movement: a Short History. Toronto: James Lorimer & Co. p. 104.
- Denis, Roch; Denis, Serge (1994). "L'action politique des syndicats québécois, de la révolution tranquille à aujourd'hui". In Alain-G., Gagnon (ed.). Québec: État et Société, Tome 1. Montreal: Les éditions Québec Amérique.
