= 1964–1965 Scripto strike =

Labor strike in Georgia, United States

- Part of the civil rights movement
- Date: November 27, 1964 – January 9, 1965 (1 month, 1 week and 6 days)
- Location: Atlanta, Georgia, United States
- Caused by: Disagreements over the terms of a labor contract
- Goals: Increased pay, improved employee benefits
- Methods: Boycott; Picketing; Strike action; Walkout
- Result: Union and company agree to a three-year contract that included increased pay and more employee benefits

Parties
International Chemical Workers Union Local 754	Scripto

Workers for the Scripto company in Atlanta, Georgia, United States, held a labor strike from November 27, 1964, to January 9, 1965. It ended when the company and union agreed to a three-year contract that included wage increases and improved employee benefits. The strike was an important event in the history of the civil rights movement, as both civil rights leaders and organized labor activists worked together to support the strike.

Scripto produced writing implements and lighters in the 1960s. Its main production facility was based in Sweet Auburn, an African-American neighborhood of Atlanta, and the company's workforce was primarily made up of black women. Since 1940, there had been various attempts to unionize the factory, including an effort by the United Steelworkers in the 1940s. By and large, unionization efforts were supported by members of Atlanta's black elite and by black church leaders in the area, who believed that a union could help improve the working conditions and wages for the workers. In 1963, the International Chemical Workers' Union (ICWU) was able to unionize the plant. This came during the civil rights movement, and union organizers succeeded in part by tying their union drive to the larger fight for civil rights that was occurring throughout the country and especially in the southern United States, where the plant was located. Following the unionization, the ICWU sought to secure a labor contract with Scripto, but the company instead challenged the union in court, arguing that the union election had been unfair. After the National Labor Relations Board ruled against the company, they remained reluctant to negotiate with the union, and negotiations continued into November 1964. The main point of contention regarded wage increases, as the union wanted an eight-percent raise across the board while the company pushed for a four-percent wage increase for "skilled" employees and a two-percent raise for "unskilled" employees. The union argued that this was racially discriminatory, as almost all of the factory's white employees were considered skilled and nearly all of the African American employees were considered unskilled.

On November 25, the day before Thanksgiving, many workers gathered and announced plans for a labor strike. Working over the holiday to prepare picket signs and coordinate logistics, they began their strike on November 27, with about 700 workers performing a walkout. From the onset, the strike had the support of several civil rights organizations, including the A. Philip Randolph Institute, Operation Breadbasket, the Student Nonviolent Coordinating Committee, and the Southern Christian Leadership Conference (SCLC), the latter of which was led by Martin Luther King Jr. King was an avid supporter of the strike, as many of the strikers were congregants of his Ebenezer Baptist Church, and he helped coordinate a nationwide boycott of Scripto products. However, as the strike continued, both the union and company remained at an impasse in negotiations, and eventually, King began to negotiate in secret with company president Carl Singer over an agreement to end the strike. After several weeks of discussions, King agreed to call off the boycott if Singer agreed to give the striking employees their Christmas bonuses. This deal, which was made without the knowledge of the union, was announced on December 24 and saw an end to King or the SCLC's involvement in the strike. Union representatives were upset with King's actions, which some historians say may have constitute an unfair labor practice. However, by this time, the union's strike fund had been nearly depleted, and without the SCLC's support, they were willing to negotiate a compromise with the company. On January 9, 1965, the union and company signed a three-year labor contract that saw an across-the-board wage increase of $0.04 per hour for every year of the contract. Additionally, workers improved employee benefits, such as additional vacation days and increased pay for working afternoon shifts.

In the aftermath of the strike, King received criticism from many different groups for his involvement, including labor activists and business leaders, and as a result, King and the SCLC refrained from involvement in another major labor dispute until the Memphis sanitation strike in 1968. Meanwhile, the company and the union developed a better relationship and jointly worked on a replacement to the "skilled"/"unskilled" system that had been at the root of the labor dispute. However, in 1977, with the Sweet Auburn facility considered outdated and the company facing increased competition, Scripto closed the plant and relocated to another facility in the Atlanta metropolitan area. The plant was eventually demolished and today the site is a parking lot for the Martin Luther King Jr. National Historical Park. Discussing the strike in 2018, historian Joseph M. Thompson stated that, while it is primarily viewed by historians in the context of King's involvement and the larger civil rights movement, it also represents a longstanding history of labor organizing among African American women in Atlanta, comparing it to other events such as the 1881 Atlanta washerwomen strike and saying, "Within this broader context, the 1964 Scripto strike looks less like a product of the midcentury civil rights movements and more like a victory in the long fight for black women's economic rights in Atlanta".

== Background ==
=== Scripto ===
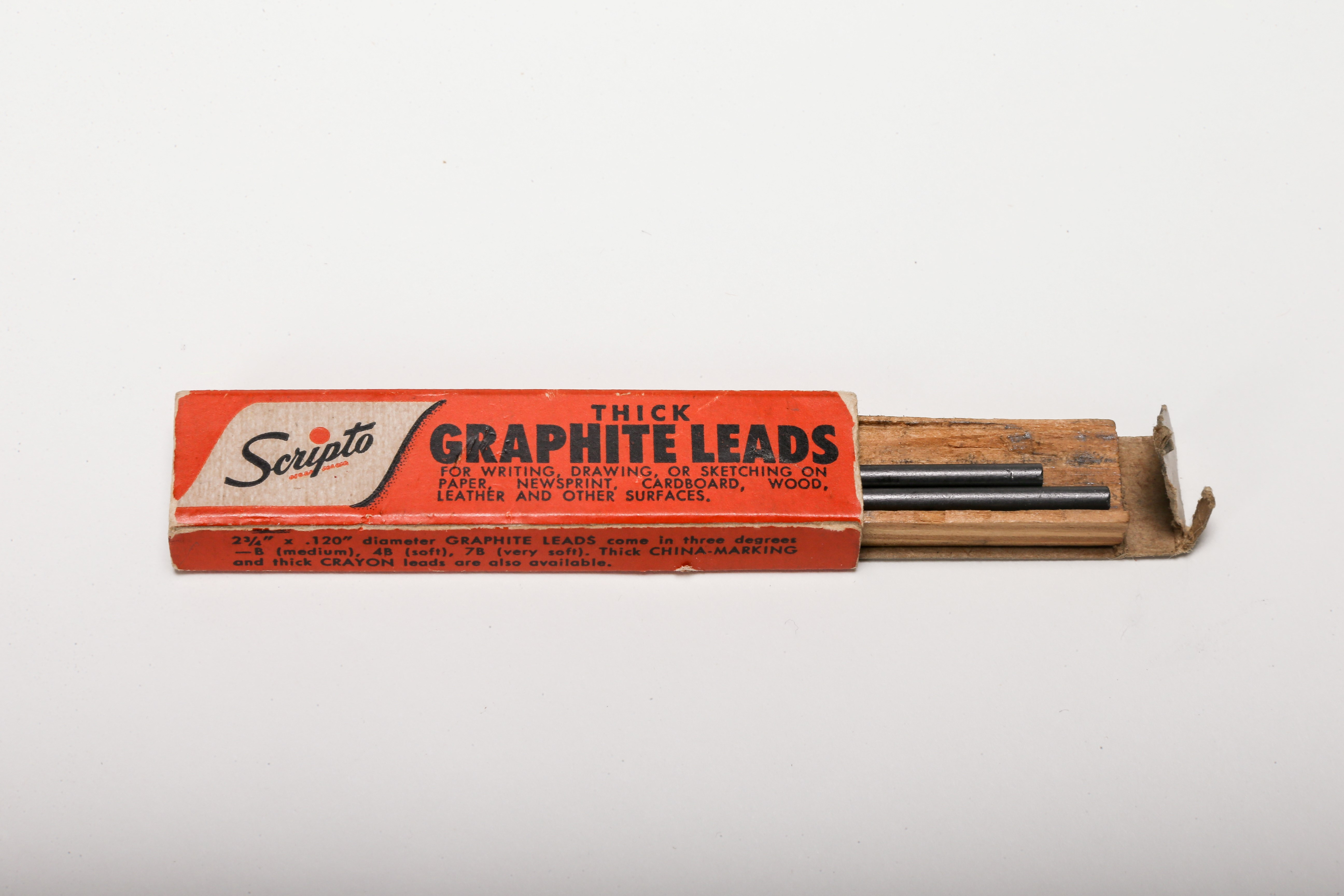
Sticks of pencil graphite produced by Scripto

The company now known as Scripto can trace its history back to the establishment of the National Pencil Company in Atlanta in 1908. In 1913, a young girl named Mary Phagan was found dead in the company's factory, and in the ensuing firestorm that followed, Leo Frank, the factory's superintendent, was lynched. The company's reputation suffered immensely from this series of events, and by the late 1910s, it had declared bankruptcy. However, local businessman Monie Ferst, who was the son-in-law of National Pencil's owner Sigmund Montag, believed that the company's factory on Forsyth Street in downtown Atlanta was still valuable and purchased the company from Montag in 1919, renaming it Atlantic Pen. Ferst was already the owner of M. A. Ferst Ltd., the only manufacturer of pencil lead in the United States at that time, and Atlantic Pen became a manufacturer of mechanical pencils. The company changed its name to Scripto in the 1920s. In 1931, the company built a new production facility east of downtown. The new plant was located at 425 Houston Street (now known as John Wesley Dobbs Avenue) in Sweet Auburn, an African-American neighborhood of Atlanta. From the 1930s through the 1960s, Scripto significantly expanded its operations, becoming a manufacturer of not only mechanical pencils, but also of pens and lighters. Additionally, from 1951 to 1954, the company operated an ordnance plant that produced artillery shells for the United States Armed Forces during the Korean War. By the 1960s, Scripto was one of the largest pen manufacturers in the country and one of the largest employers in the city. The company was selling its products internationally and was the world's largest producer of writing implements.

=== Unionization efforts in the 1940s and 1950s ===
Following the company's relocation to Sweet Auburn, Scripto began to recruit employees from the local African American community for low-wage positions. Many black women viewed a job at Scripto as preferable to being a domestic worker for white Americans, and the company began to employ hundreds of black women at the factory. By 1940, roughly 80 percent of the plant's workforce was made up of African Americans. However, despite the perception of Scripto as a better employer than other options in the city, workplace discrimination against African American workers there was still persistent, and the company's management was still made up entirely of white people. In light of these issues, starting in the 1940s, there were several unionization efforts among the plant employees. In 1940, the United Steelworkers (USW) became the first labor union to attempt to organize the Scripto workers. Their efforts ultimately failed, with union organizers accusing the few white employees who worked in the factory of undermining support for the union.

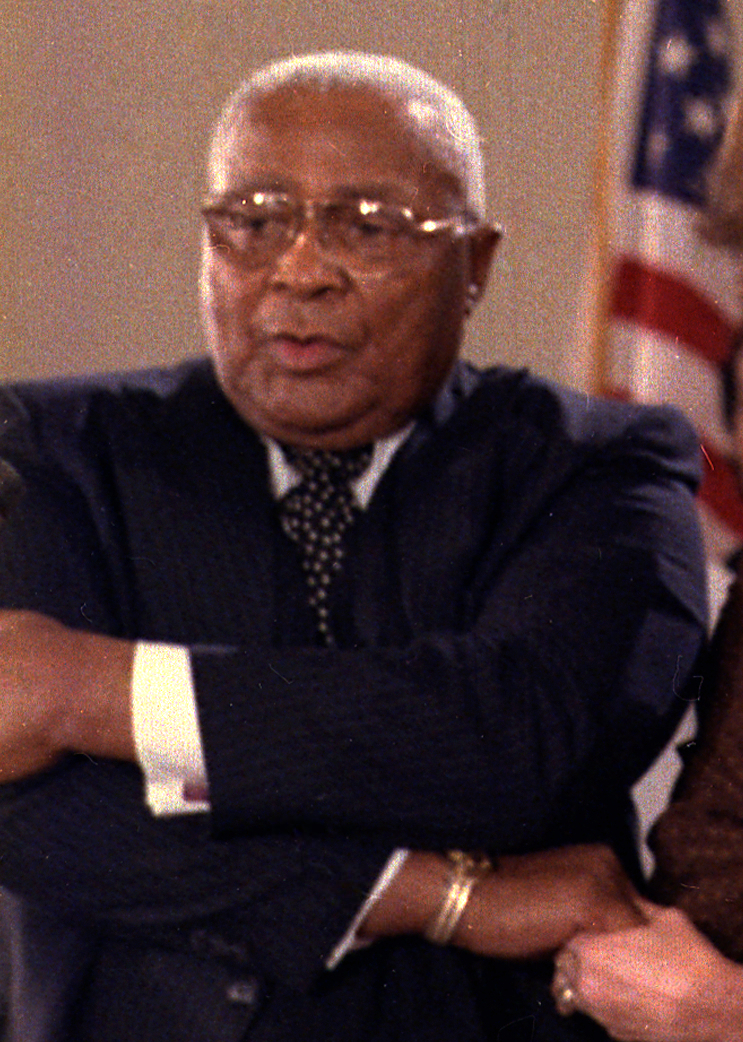
Martin Luther King Sr. (pictured 1979) was an early supporter of the USW's union drive at Scripto.

In 1946, the USW again tried to organize a union at the Scripto plant, and following a union vote, they began to officially represent the workers in February of that year. The USW's success was due in large part to support from local black church leaders in the area, such as Martin Luther King Sr. King's church, Ebenezer Baptist Church, was located only a few blocks from the Scripto plant, and many of the Scripto employees were congregants of the church. USW official W. H. Crawford later wrote to King to express his gratitude, saying that King's support of the unionization effort resulted in its success. However, Scripto disputed the results of the union election and refused to collectively bargain with the union. As a result, the USW called for a strike on October 7, and over 500 of the company's 600 African American workers took part in picketing. The union's demands included a union contract, increased wages, paid vacations, and eight-hour shifts. The strike lasted for about six months, during which time the strikers were subjected to harassment from members of the Atlanta Police Department, which at the time included known members of the Ku Klux Klan. However, on March 22, 1947, with little to no progress made on achieving their goals, the USW called off the strike. Of the 400 workers who had remained on strike until the end, only 19 were rehired by Scripto, prompting the USW to file charges against the company with the National Labor Relations Board (NLRB), though the board later found the company free of any legal wrongdoing.

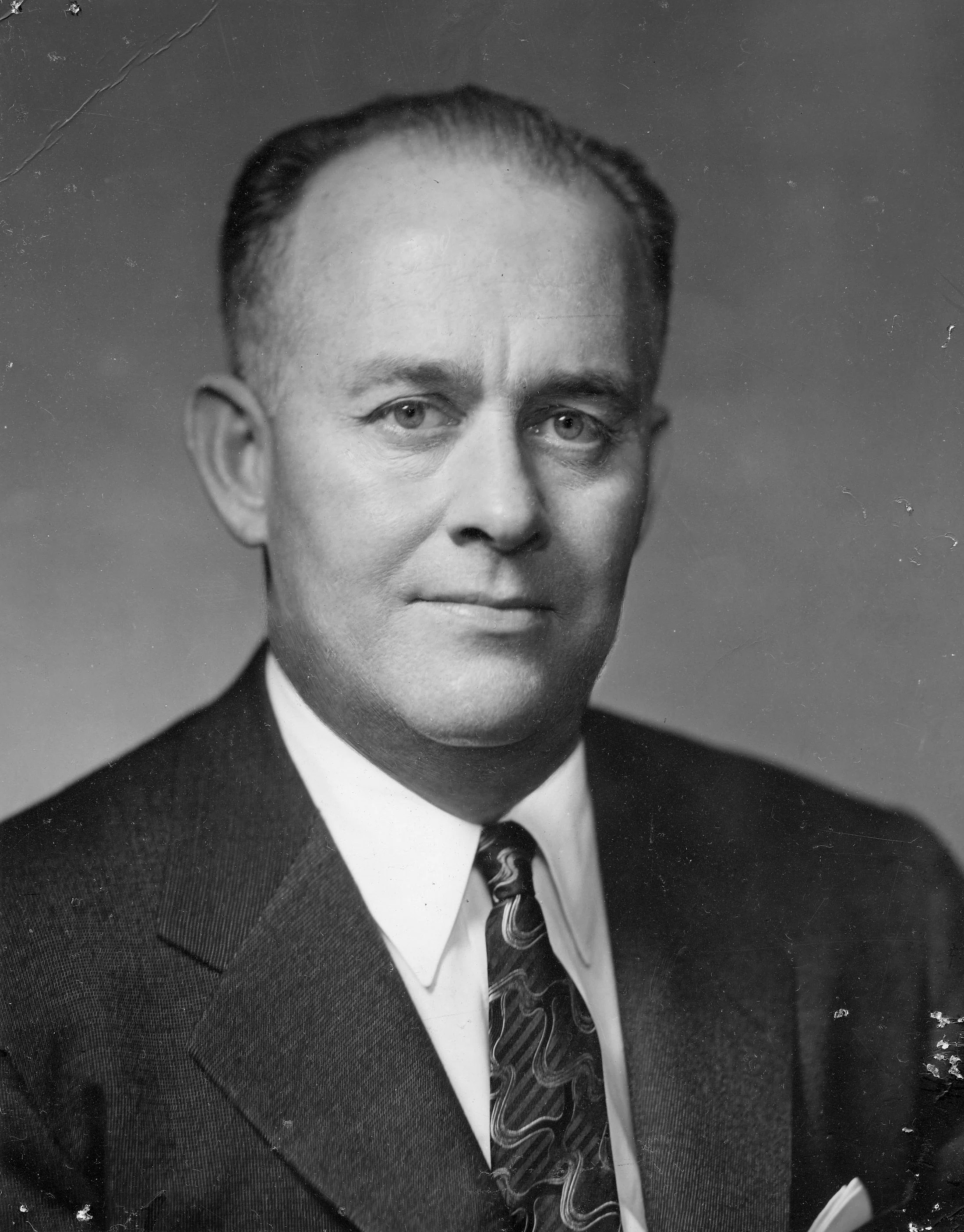
James V. Carmichael c. 1957

In 1947, following the end of the USW strike, local businessman and former politician James V. Carmichael became the president of Scripto. As a politician, Carmichael had served in the Georgia General Assembly in the 1930s and was a candidate in the 1946 Georgia gubernatorial election against Eugene Talmadge. Despite winning a plurality of votes, Carmichael lost the election to Talmadge due to Georgia's county unit system that was used in elections. As a businessman, Carmichael is known for his role in aircraft manufacturing, as he was an assistant general manager of the Bell Bomber Plant in Marietta, Georgia, during World War II and later convinced the Lockheed Corporation to locate a plant in the city. He viewed himself as a benevolent employer and took a paternalistic approach to management. In 1952, before a speech at his alma mater of Emory University, he stated that workers had been exploited by business owners in the past and that unionization was one way that workers attempted to fight back against those abuses but also criticized workers for "blindly" following union leaders and advocated instead for an "enlightened management" that would eliminate the need for unions altogether. On issues regarding race, Carmichael was viewed as either a moderate, and in the 1946 election, he openly criticized Talmadge, a white supremacist, calling his previous administration a "ranting dictatorship" and saying, "No one is going to invest money in industry when you have in the governor’s office a man who is continually stirring up race and class hatred and creating unrest in labor’s ranks". Additionally, Carmichael took pride in Scripto's hiring policies, as it was one of the first companies in the city to employ African Americans in production roles. During the 1950s, when Sweet Auburn was experiencing an economic downturn, Scripto was one of the few companies to continue to grow. During this same time, Carmichael turned down several offers to relocate the plant outside of the city, and company executives made it a point to continue to hire black women. However, during a unionization effort at the company's ordnance plant in 1953, Carmichael fired several of the workers who were involved before the plant shut down the following year.

=== ICWU unionization ===
In late 1962, the International Chemical Workers Union (ICWU), an AFL–CIO-affiliated union that had had recent success in organizing smaller production facilities in the Atlanta metropolitan area, began a union drive at Scripto. The ICWU believed that the organization effort would be difficult, as the plant's overwhelmingly majority workforce of black women constituted a demographic that the union felt was not typically responsive to organized labor efforts. In an attempt to win support, the ICWU ensured that the drive focused not only on traditional labor activism topics but also on civil rights. The union called on James Hampton, an African American labor activist and Baptist preacher, to go to Atlanta and help with their organizing efforts. In discussions with the workers, Hampton compared his own work in labor organizing to the work of civil rights leader Martin Luther King Jr., drawing a connection between the ICWU's organizing efforts and the activities of the nationwide civil rights movement. 1963 had been a momentous year for the civil rights movement, as many landmark events had taken place around the time that the ICWU was organizing the Scripto workers, including the Birmingham campaign in nearby Alabama, the Stand in the Schoolhouse Door following the desegregation of the University of Alabama, and the assassination of NAACP field secretary Medgar Evers in Mississippi. Hampton also worked with black church leaders in Atlanta, such as King Sr., to get their support for the strike. Hampton was overall successful in getting African American clergy to support the ICWU's efforts, though one notable exception was William Holmes Borders, the pastor of Wheat Street Baptist Church, who declined to support the union drive because of his personal friendship with Carmichael.

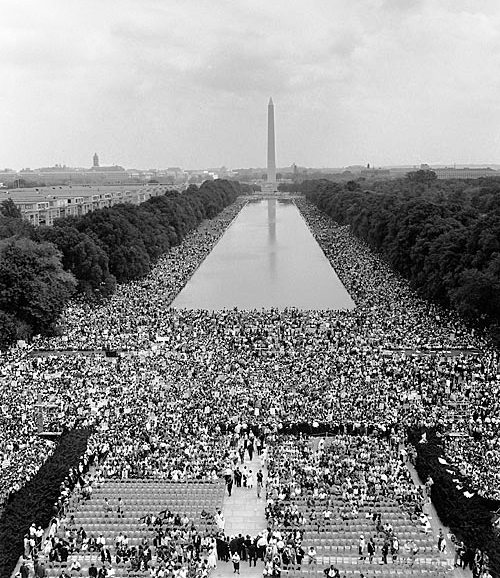
The union drive occurred during the civil rights movement, with the March on Washington for Jobs and Freedom taking place just a month before the vote.

By August 1963, the ICWU had obtained enough authorization cards that they could petition for an NLRB election. The company agreed to an election in late September. In the meantime, hoping to prevent a successful union vote, the company instituted several changes, including the formation of an employee committee and the removal of racial segregation signs from the plant's bathrooms and water fountains. In the ensuing six weeks, the union focused on building solidarity among the employees and assuaging fears over company reprisals against those involved in the union efforts, while the company focused on appealing to the goodwill that they felt they had fostered with longtime employees. On September 11, about two weeks before the vote was scheduled to take place, Carmichael gathered about 1,000 employees and gave a speech wherein he highlighted his progressive stance on race and urged the employees to vote against unionization, saying in part that "a vote for the union [would be] a slap in the face of one of the truest friends the Negro ever had in Georgia or in the entire South". However, to many workers, support for the union drive was tied to the civil rights movement, and in the weeks leading up to the vote, other notable events, such as King Jr.'s "I Have a Dream" at the March on Washington for Jobs and Freedom in Washington, D.C., and the 16th Street Baptist Church bombing in Birmingham, Alabama, contributed to an atmosphere of heightened racial partisanship among the workers. On September 27, the election was held, and of the 1,005 employees who were eligible to vote, 953, or approximately 95 percent, did. Of these 1,005, 855 were African American. In a 519–428 result, the union won and became the official representative of the workers. Scripto employees were grouped under the local union of ICWU Local 754, which was made up almost entirely of black women.

A week after the election had taken place, Thomas C. Shelton of the Atlanta-based law firm Kilpatrick, Cody, Rogers, McClatchey & Regenstein, Scripto's legal counsel, filed objections with the NLRB, arguing that the union's use of racial rhetoric and drawing connections to the larger civil rights movement had caused the "sober, informed exercise of the employees' vote" to be impossible, rendering the election null. While the Regional Director of the NLRB rejected the objection, Shelton continued to argue that the results of the election was unfair, citing previous NLRB rulings regarding the use of race-related issues in influencing union votes. For instance, in 1962, the NLRB ruled in an election involving the Sewell Manufacturing Company that "appeals to racial prejudice in matters unrelated to the election issues ... have no place in Board electoral campaigns". Additionally, in a 1957 case involving the Westinghouse Electric Corporation, the NLRB stated that "the consequences of injecting the racial issue where racial prejudices are likely to exist is to pit race against race and thereby distort a clear expression of choice on the issue of unionism". Shelton also argued that the characterization of Carmichael and Scripto by the union was unfair and inaccurate and collected testimony from several prominent individuals that highlighted Carmichael's and the company's stance on race. Benjamin Mays, president of Morehouse College and a longtime friend of Carmichael, spoke positively of his positions on racial issues, while former mayor of Atlanta William B. Hartsfield said that Scripto was well known for their progressive stance on hiring African Americans. Finally, on June 9, 1964, after about ten months of petitioning, the NLRB denied Shelton's requests and awarded the ICWU a certificate of representation for Scripto.

=== Contract negotiations ===
Despite the NLRB's awarding of a certificate of representation, the ICWU expressed dismay over the negotiations they were having with the company over the terms of a new labor contract. Jerry Levine, a labor activist from New York City who had joined the ICWU in October 1963, served as the representative for the ICWU in their negotiations with Scripto. Levine said that the contract negotiations lasted for about six months, during which time he said the company was "going through the motions" of bargaining in good faith, often spending weeks at a time discussing the contents of a couple of paragraphs. Additionally, important issues such as wages and other economic policies were not being addressed. As the negotiations continued, Levine began to believe that strike action was the only way to convince the company to agree to a contract, and while negotiations were ongoing, the union sought to strengthen its ties and increase support in the local community. Also during this time, Carmichael had been removed from his position of president by Ferst and placed in the ceremonial role of chairman. The move came due to Carmichael's poor health and a steady decline in Scripto's sales. For two years leading up to 1964, Scripto had had declining profits, which were attributed to labor costs and increased competition. In his new role, Carmichael was not involved in the contract negotiations and functioned mostly as a spokesperson for the brand. Carl Singer, a businessman who had previously worked in Chicago for the Sealy Mattress Company, was brought in to replace Carmichael as Scripto's president and chief executive officer. At the time, Singer was aware that there were contract negotiations, but was not made aware of the issues the company was having with the union. This corporate shakeup was kept private from the general public.

By November 1964, the company's proposal to the union would have seen a four-percent wage increase for workers categorized as "skilled" and two-percent wage increases for "unskilled" workers. At the time, unskilled workers at the factory were earning between $1.25 and $1.30 per hour, and the two-percent wage increase would have amounted to about $0.03 more per hour. The union rebuffed with a proposal of an eight-percent wage increase across the board. The union also alleged that the company's proposed wage increase was not an actual pay increase, as the company was planning to offer the raises at the expense of its Christmas bonuses, which often amounted to about a week's pay. Additionally, the union called the company's proposal discriminatory, as only six African American workers at Scripto were considered skilled. The remainder of the company's skilled employees were white, while the rest of the African American employees were classified as unskilled. At the time, Scripto had about 700 African American employees, most of whom were women, and about 200 white workers. (Note: Sources vary somewhat on the number of workers at Scripto during this time, as well as the breakdown of these workers. Multiple contemporary sources, including Newsweek and The New York Times state that the company had about 700 African American employees, primarily women, who were almost all considered unskilled. This number is additionally given in a 1965 article in The Crisis, the official organ of the NAACP, which also states that the company had about 200 white workers. Reports from the Bureau of Labor Statistics in 1965 stated that Scripto had 750 unskilled workers and 900 workers total. A 1994 report by the National Park Service states that Scripto employed about 950 workers in 1964. That same report states that roughly 633 of the company's 836 maintenance and production workers were black women. A 1999 article in the journal Atlanta History states that in 1964, the company had 1,005 employees, of whom approximately 85 percent were black and considered unskilled. A 2018 article in the journal Atlanta Studies also uses the figure of 1,005 and states that 855 of these employees were black and classified as unskilled.) On average, these unskilled workers at Scripto earned $400 below the national poverty threshold.

=== Move toward strike action ===
On November 25, 1964, the day before Thanksgiving, workers constituting almost the entirety of the first shift met at the ICWU union hall on Edgewood Avenue, near the factory, and demanded that a strike be commenced. The action caught Levine off guard, and he was unsure what had prompted the sudden movement, though he speculated that it stemmed from disappointment from the workers' bargaining unit that had spread to the rank-and-file employees. While Levine felt that the timing was not right for the strike, he nonetheless acquiesced to the workers' demands, and they began to prepare for a strike. The employees worked over the holiday in order to have picket signs made for when the plant reopened on November 27, the day after Thanksgiving. Company executives who were on holiday vacations were alerted to the strike preparations, and many returned to Atlanta early.

== Course of the strike ==
=== Early strike activities ===
The strike began on November 27, 1964, the day after Thanksgiving, with a walkout. Approximately 85 percent of the plant's workforce participated in the strike, made up primarily of about 700 black women. However, 117 skilled workers, which included six black men, did not participate in the strike. Under Georgia's right-to-work laws, the plant remained open during the strike, and according to the plant's general manager, the factory was continuing to operate under its three-shift schedule without interruption. Outside the plant, the striking employees carried picket signs with slogans such as "We're Human Beings — Not Machines" and "We Won't Be Slaves No More" and sang protest songs including "We Shall Not Be Moved" and "We Shall Overcome". In the first week of the strike, the Atlanta Daily World, the city's African-American newspaper, reported on the strike with front-page coverage. National news agencies also covered the strike, with their reporting focusing primarily on the racial issues at play. Through the course of the strike, Scripto hired replacement workers to keep the plant running, and they placed "Help Wanted" advertisements in many local newspapers, including the Daily World, which prompted controversy among the paper's primarily black readership. Meanwhile, strikers received a weekly strike pay of $57 from the union, in addition to fringe benefits. The ICWU did not initially have the provisions in place to fund the strike, and for the first two weeks, Levine met with local labor leaders and activist groups to help fund the strike. While labor leaders were largely supportive of the strike and offered financial support, rank-and-file union members were less supportive.

=== Initial attempts at mediation ===
A week after the strike began, representatives from the union and the company met with William S. Bradford, a mediator for the Federal Mediation and Conciliation Service, to attempt to resolve their issues. The main point of discussion in the meetings regarded the differences in pay increases between unskilled and skilled employees. The union viewed the issue as a racial one, as the company's proposal would have resulted in a vast majority of the African American workforce receiving a substantially lower raise than their white counterparts. Additionally, the union alleged that a reason for this was that the company did not offer training to African Americans that would have allowed them to be classified as skilled workers. The company rejected the union's view that the matter was primarily racial and instead argued that the dispute was a purely economic one. Throughout the strike, the company continued to downplay the racial aspect of the labor dispute. During these mediation sessions, both sides held to the same pay raise proposals that they had made before the strike. Additionally, the company's proposal would not have seen workers' union dues withheld from their paychecks. As a result, during the first few weeks of the strike, the two sides remained at an impasse in negotiations.

=== Involvement of Martin Luther King Jr. and the Southern Christian Leadership Conference ===
From the early days of the union drive, both King Jr. and King Sr., who were co-pastors at Ebenezer Baptist, voiced their support for the ICWU's efforts and kept up to date on the ongoings at Scripto. The younger King had grown up in the same neighborhood that the plant was in, which was only a few blocks from his house, and many of the employees who were involved in the union drive were church congregants, such as Mary Gurley, who was a leader of the strike and an influential member of the church. King Jr., who by this time was an internationally recognized leader in the civil rights movement, had returned to Atlanta in 1960 to pastor at Ebenezer. At that time, many members of Atlanta's black elite, which included Jesse Hill, Samuel Woodrow Williams, and the younger King's father, among others, did not want to see him engage in the same type of high-profile activism that he had been involved in elsewhere. The city's African American power brokers had spent years crafting agreements with the city's white power structure for racial progress, and many were fearful that the younger King's actions could jeopardize the status quo. While the younger King had kept a primarily low-profile during most of his time in Atlanta, he nonetheless engaged in civil rights activism within the city, such as his involvement in the Atlanta sit-ins in 1960. Early in the strike, The Wall Street Journal reported that the younger King was among several prominent African American leaders who supported the strike.

On November 29, the younger King, acting in his role as the president of the Southern Christian Leadership Conference (SCLC), an Atlanta-based civil rights organization whose headquarters were only a few blocks from the plant, sent a telegram to Carmichael wherein he expressed his support for the strikers, criticized the company for being anti-union and racially discriminatory, and said that he would call for a boycott of Scripto products if the strike persisted. (Note: A 1999 article in Atlanta History states that King sent the telegram on November 29. However, a 1994 report by the National Park Service states that, "On November 30, Dr. King informed Scripto that the SCLC supported the strikers and threatened to lead a nationwide boycott of Scripto products if the strike remained unsettled".) On December 1, King was scheduled to speak to a large group of strikers at a rally held across the street from the factory, but he was unable to attend the meeting due to a meeting he had with Federal Bureau of Investigation Director J. Edgar Hoover that same day in Washington, D.C. The Reverend C. T. Vivian, who had moved to Atlanta in 1963 to become an executive in the SCLC, took his place, while other speakers included the Reverend Joseph E. Boone, Georgia State Senator Leroy Johnson, and union negotiator Phil Whitehead. SCLC executive Ralph Abernathy also became involved in the strike effort at this time and participated in picketing with protesting workers.

Vivian had been the primary voice within the SCLC for supporting the strike, as he viewed unions as a way for African Americans to attain economic equality based on his previous work experience in civil rights organizing in Illinois. By contrast, King's view of organized labor was more mixed. While he was a vocal advocate for economic justice and often solicited unions for financial support, he was also often critical of unions as hindrances to economic mobility for African Americans, as many unions in the United States at the time discriminated against black people and barred them from membership. Additionally, while some unions had supported King's March on Washington the previous year, the AFL–CIO did not, and many of their associated unions were not active in organizing workers in the southern United States. Overall, most of the support for the strike from black clergy and civil rights leaders in the city stemmed less from their support for organized labor and more from the fact that many of the strikers were members of their congregations. However, in a December 4 television interview, King stated, "We have decided that now is the time to identify our movement very closely with labor". While Vivian viewed the strike as a way to strengthen the bond between organized labor and the civil rights movement, SCLC executive Hosea Williams saw the strike as a way for King to buck the local black leadership and lead a demonstration in Atlanta, which was viewed as a major center for African American culture in the United States.

On December 4, King left Atlanta to travel to Oslo to accept the Nobel Peace Prize. He spent about two weeks traveling during this time, including to London, New York City, and Washington, D.C., before returning to Atlanta on December 18. The next day, within 24 hours of returning, King marched in a picket line with several other protestors, including a union representative from the ICWU's international headquarters in Amsterdam. Coming so soon after his Nobel Peace Prize acceptance, the action helped to bring international attention to the strike. The following day, on December 20, King spoke to about 250 striking employees at a rally at Ebenezer Baptist. During the speech, he reiterated the SCLC's support for the strike and stressed the interconnectedness of the labor movement and the civil rights movement, saying, "Along with the struggle to desegregate, we must engage in the struggle for better jobs". Throughout the strike, King's involvement was highly criticized by many conservative groups. Local businessman and politician Lester Maddox placed an advertisement in The Atlanta Journal that called King and the SCLC activists "Communist inspired racial agitators", while Calvin Craig, a grand dragon of the United Klans of America, said that King was "overstepping the bounds of Christianity" by getting involved in the strike.

=== Boycott ===
One of the biggest contributions that the SCLC had to the strike effort was in organizing a national boycott of Scripto products as a way to apply pressure to Scripto. Vivian contacted 2,500 SCLC affiliates to inform them of the boycott, and the organization made requests to merchants to remove Scripto displays from their stores. In addition, several other civil rights and labor organizations supported the boycott, including the Student Nonviolent Coordinating Committee (SNCC), the A. Philip Randolph Institute, Operation Breadbasket, and the Atlanta Labor Council. Over 500,000 leaflets were printed and distributed to local unions across the United States asking them to respect the boycott. These leaflets featured a crying Santa Claus with a printed message reading, "Don't buy Scripto products". John Lewis, the chairman of the SNCC, wrote a letter to the General Services Administration (an independent agency of the United States government) urging them to also honor the boycott. At the time, Scripto held two contracts with the federal government of the United States, and Lewis stated in his letter that Scripto had been able to underbid other manufacturers for these contracts by engaging in "economic slavery" with their African American workers. The GSA responded that they would investigate the matter, specifically concerning whether Scripto was in violation of Executive Order 10925, which mandated equal opportunity in the workforce. However, nothing came of this investigation by the time the boycott ended.

=== Negotiations between Singer and King and the end of the strike ===
At a meeting between union and company representatives on December 21, the company put forward a proposal that included a four-cent pay increase across the board. However, the union balked at the proposal, which would have still included the removal of the workers' Christmas bonuses. By this time, almost all parties involved in the strike were experiencing hardships caused by the labor dispute. Strikers were losing approximately $50 a day in lost wages, while the ICWU had exhausted almost all of their strike funds. Additionally, leaders within the SCLC were worried about the potential negative consequences that a failed strike could have on their organization, which they had helped to elevate from a local issue to a nationally known issue. Meanwhile, the company, despite reporting that their production levels and sales were comparable to pre-strike levels, had seen their reputation damaged by the strike. Despite this, picketing continued, with Levine leading about 200 strikers on a march through downtown on December 23.

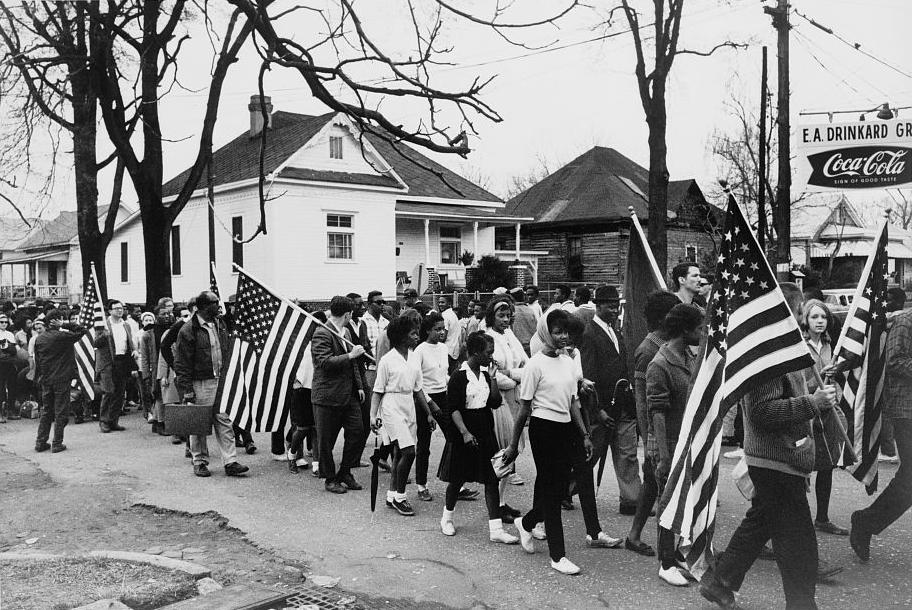
King may have been willing to negotiate an end to SCLC involvement in the strike because he wanted to focus his attention on the Selma voting rights movement.

Unbeknownst to Levine and others in the union, over the course of several weeks, Singer and King had been in contact with each other and had discussed ways to bring the strike to an end. Singer, who had been unwilling to negotiate with the union, had telephoned King directly to negotiate with him, despite King having no authorization from the ICWU to act as a negotiator. Over the course of several weeks, King and Singer had four meetings at Scripto's headquarters, with very few people on either side being made aware of these meetings. During the discussions, both sides came to an agreement wherein King would have the SCLC end its boycott if the company agreed to give the workers their Christmas bonuses. King may have been willing to accept this agreement in part because he and the SCLC were planning for a campaign in Selma, Alabama, that would later include the Selma to Montgomery marches, and their planning was behind schedule.

This tentative agreement was reached on the evening of December 23, with Levine being alerted to it while at the march in downtown. A meeting was swiftly set up at Ebenezer Baptist between ICWU and SCLC officials, including both Kings and Levine, and SCLC member Andrew Young was responsible for informing the union officials of the agreement. Vivian was not present and may not have been invited due to his strong union support, as SCLC members may have felt that he would have strongly opposed the agreement. Upon first hearing of the agreement, which he believed was only a proposal, Levine objected to it, as he said that the Christmas bonuses would have been guaranteed in any settlement since the workers were legally entitled to them. Despite Levine's objections, the agreement was made public the next day, and both the boycott and any involvement between the SCLC and the strike ended on December 24. The union felt that King's actions had undermined the strike, and the secret meetings between King and Singer may have constituted an unfair labor practice, as the ICWU was the only legally recognized representative for bargaining with the ICWU workers they represented. However, the ICWU never took legal action on the matter. With the agreement in place between the SCLC and Scripto, the union spent the rest of the year working on a formal proposal that would see an end to the strike. Negotiations resumed on December 29, and though there were still some disagreements regarding pay, an agreement was reached shortly thereafter. On January 9, 1965, the union and company announced in a joint statement that they had come to an agreement on a new labor contract, and the strike was called off that day.

== Aftermath and legacy ==
=== Terms of the contract ===
The three-year contract signed between the ICWU and Scripto was the first in the company's history and affected about 900 workers. As part of the contract, Scripto's employees received across-the-board wage increases, with an annual raise of $0.04 every year for the three-year duration of the contract. In 1967, the minimum wage in the United States was increased from $1.25 to $1.40 per hour, and some of the workers who were making below this amount had their pay increases adjusted. Additionally, Scripto agreed to rehire 155 strikers whose positions had been taken over by replacements while also agreeing to retain the employees they had hired during the strike. Employees were also guaranteed an additional $0.21 per hour for afternoon shift work and five paid holidays, as well as two weeks of paid vacation after a year of working for the company and a paid day for attending funerals. The company also instituted a training program that would make it easier for unskilled employees to become skilled employees. The company also agreed to officially recognize the union and instituted a system where union dues were automatically collected from employees' paychecks. Following the strike, the company began to work with the union to address issues regarding racial discrimination, and eventually the company's system of skilled and unskilled workers was replaced with a system of 22 different job grades that had been established in a joint effort between the company and the union. Additionally, King and Singer began to develop a better relationship following the strike, and during King's funeral in 1968, Scripto paid for security for the King family and also closed their plant to allow workers to pay their respects.

=== Martin Luther King Jr. ===
King's involvement in the strike drew criticism from many people, including labor activists and business leaders. Among union organizers, King's secret negotiations with Singer were seen as an interference in the bargaining process. Meanwhile, both white business leaders and the black elite in Atlanta felt that King's actions had disturbed a system that they had in place that saw gradual civil rights progress in exchange for a deemphasis on overt protests. Additionally, some members of the city's African American community felt that Scripto had been an unfair target for civil rights activism, given the company's reputation in the community as a provider of stable jobs and their executives' commitment to hiring African American workers. On January 27, King was honored with a banquet in Atlanta to celebrate his winning the Nobel Peace Prize. However, many of the city's white business leaders voiced their displeasure with King's actions during the strike and initially threatened to not attend the event. In the immediate aftermath of the strike, King had vowed that there would be "more to come" with regards to working with labor activists, and in 1965, the SCLC considered training union organizers. However, given the poor reception of the Scripto strike, the SCLC and King generally refrained from involvement in labor issues. Additionally, Scripto and the ICWU excluded the SCLC from future negotiations after the initial three-year contract expired in the late 1960s. King would not become deeply involved in another labor strike until the Memphis sanitation strike of 1968.

=== Later history ===
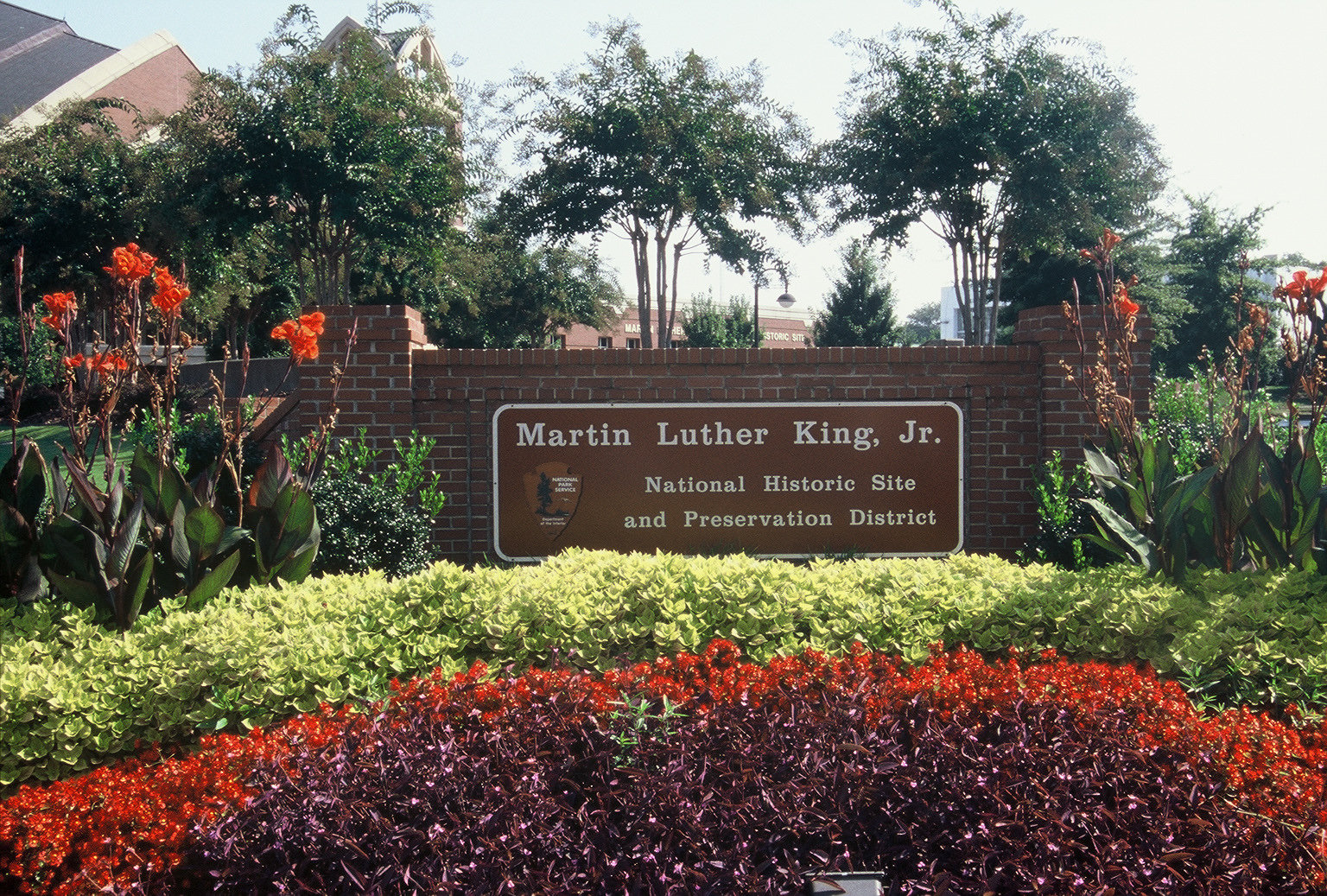
The site of the Scripto plant is now a parking lot for the Martin Luther King Jr. National Historical Park.

Through the late 1960s and into the 1970s, Scripto faced increased competition from competitors such as Société Bic and Paper Mate. Additionally, the Sweet Auburn facility, which the company had operated for several decades, had become outdated. In December 1977, Scripto closed their Sweet Auburn facility and relocated their production to a plant in Doraville, Georgia. Through the later part of the 20th century, Scripto would be bought out by several larger conglomerates and their production facilities would be relocated out of Georgia, first to California and later to Mexico. The company continued to own the property in Sweet Auburn until the 1990s, by which point the property had been abandoned for many years and was listed as a toxic waste site. This was part of a larger downward trend for the neighborhood, which experienced a severe economic decline through the 1980s and 1990s. Around this same time, The Trust for Public Land, a nonprofit organization, began to focus its efforts on combating urban decay in the area. The organization purchased the industrial area and paid for their demolition and asbestos removal. This was done in part as preparations for the 1996 Summer Olympics, which were held in Atlanta. That same year, The Trust for Public Land turned over the property to the National Park Service, and today the land is home to a parking lot for the Martin Luther King Jr. National Historical Park.

Discussing the strike in 2018, historian Joseph M. Thompson of Mississippi State University said that, while the strike is primarily viewed by historians only in the context of King's involvement and the relationship between the civil rights movement and the labor movement, it also reflected a tradition of organized labor among black women in Atlanta. He points to the previous unionization attempts at the plant as evidence of this and ties the 1960s strike to other moments in the history of Atlanta, such as the 1881 Atlanta washerwomen strike. According to Thompson, "Within this broader context, the 1964 Scripto strike looks less like a product of the midcentury civil rights movements and more like a victory in the long fight for black women's economic rights in Atlanta."

== Sources ==
- Allen, Frederick (1996). Atlanta Rising: The Invention of an International City, 1946–1996. Marietta, Georgia: Longstreet Press. ISBN 978-1-4616-6167-2.
- Araiza, Lauren (2014). To March for Others: The Black Freedom Struggle and the United Farm Workers. Philadelphia: University of Pennsylvania Press. ISBN 978-0-8122-4557-8.
- "Accord Reached in Scripto Strike; Negroes' Walkout in Atlanta Was Aided by Dr. King". The New York Times. Associated Press. January 10, 1965. p. 30. ISSN 0362-4331. Archived from the original on September 19, 2022.
- Blythe, Robert W.; Carroll, Maureen; Moffson, Steven H. (August 1994). Martin Luther King Jr. National Historic Site: Historic Resource Study. National Park Service.
- Burns, Rebecca (2011). Burial for a King: Martin Luther King Jr.'s Funeral and the Week that Transformed Atlanta and Rocked the Nation. New York City: Charles Scribner's Sons. ISBN 978-1-4391-4309-4.
- "NAACP Board Member Aids Strikers". The Crisis. 72 (2). NAACP: 122–123. February 1965.
- Drummond, Traci (January 22, 2013). "MLK's Labor Legacy began in Atlanta". University Library News. Georgia State University. Archived from the original on November 7, 2021.
- Foner, Philip S.; Lewis, Ronald L.; Cvornyek, Robert, eds. (1984). The Black Worker: A Documentary History from Colonial Times to the Present. Vol. VIII: The Black Worker since the AFL–CIO Merger, 1955–1980. Philadelphia: Temple University Press. ISBN 978-0-87722-136-4.
- Honey, Michael K. (2007). Going Down Jericho Road: The Memphis Strike, Martin Luther King's Last Campaign. New York City: W. W. Norton & Company. ISBN 978-0-393-07832-9.
- Hooper, Hartwell; Hooper, Susan (Fall 1999). "The Scripto Strike: Martin Luther King's "Valley of Problems": Atlanta, 1964–1965". Atlanta History: A Journal of Georgia and the South. XLIII (3). Atlanta Historical Society: 5–34.
- Hornsby, Alton Jr. (2009). Black Power in Dixie: A Political History of African Americans in Atlanta. Foreword by Stanley Harrold and Randall M. Miller. Gainesville, Florida: University Press of Florida. ISBN 978-0-8130-3282-5.
- Isdell, Neville; Beasley, David (2011). Inside Coca-Cola: A CEO's Life Story of Building the World's Most Popular Brand. New York City: St. Martin's Press. ISBN 978-1-4299-8889-6.
- King, Martin Luther Jr. (2011). Honey, Michael K. (ed.). "All Labor Has Dignity". Introductions by Michael K. Honey. Boston: Beacon Press. ISBN 978-0-8070-8602-5.
- Mantler, Gordon K. (2013). Power to the Poor: Black-Brown Coalition and the Fight for Economic Justice, 1960–1974. Chapel Hill, North Carolina: University of North Carolina Press. ISBN 978-0-8078-3851-8.
- "Chronology of Recent Labor Events". Monthly Labor Review. 88 (2). Bureau of Labor Statistics: 194–195. February 1965.
- "Developments in Industrial Relations". Monthly Labor Review. 88 (3). Bureau of Labor Statistics: 321–325. March 1965.
- "Civil Rights Group Backs Scripto Strike in Atlanta". The New York Times. December 17, 1964. p. 46. ISSN 0362-4331. Archived from the original on September 19, 2022.
- "Bonds and Ball Points". Newsweek. The Washington Post Company: 47. December 28, 1964.
- Quinnell, Kenneth (January 19, 2021). "Pathway to Progress: Martin Luther King Jr. and the Scripto Strike". AFL–CIO. Archived from the original on July 24, 2022.
- Rosenbloom, Joseph (2018). Redemption: Martin Luther King Jr.'s Last 31 Hours. Boston: Beacon Press. ISBN 978-0-8070-8338-3.
- Thompson, Joseph M. (September 4, 2018). "The Scripto Strikes: James V. Carmichael and Black Women's Labor Organizing in Downtown Atlanta". Atlanta Studies. doi:10.18737/atls20180904. ISSN 2471-3147. S2CID 166241128. Archived from the original on May 11, 2021.
- Thompson, Joseph M. (December 21, 2021). "The Scripto Strikes". New Georgia Encyclopedia. Archived from the original on June 27, 2022.
