= Scripto =

American brand

Scripto, U.S.A.
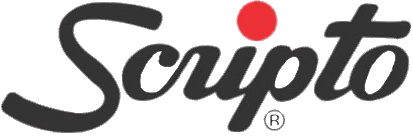
- Formerly: M.A. Ferst Company (1924); Scripto (1924–88); Scripto-Tokai (1988–?)
- Company type: Private (1924–73); Subsidiary (1973–)
- Industry: Tobacco; Stationery (former)
- Founded: 1924; 102 years ago in Atlanta, GA, U.S.
- Founder: M.A. Ferst
- Fate: Acquired by Tokai-Seiki in 1984, then became a brand after other takeovers
- Headquarters: Ontario, California, U.S.
- Area served: North America
- Key people: James V. Carmichael (president, 1947–64); Carl Singer (president)
- Products: Butane lighters (1955–present); Writing instruments (former)
- Owner: Calico Brands (2005)
- Number of employees: ~300
- Parent: Wilkinson Sword (1973–78); Allegheny Technologies (1978–84); Tokai-Seiki (1984–)
- Subsidiaries: Anja Engineering Corp. (1959–present)
- Website: calicobrands.com/scripto

Scripto is an American brand currently owned by Calico Brands. The original manufacturing company was founded in Atlanta, Georgia, in 1923 by Monie A. Ferst. At one time the largest producer of writing instruments in the world, now Calico Brands markets butane lighters under the Scripto brand.

== History ==
=== Early years ===
The company was originally known as the M.A. Ferst Company until changing its name to Scripto, Latin for "I write", in 1924. Ferst sold mechanical pencils, pens, and pencils as well as their refillables. Ferst increased his sales ability by adding advertising (such as customer names) and commemorative memorabilia to his product line. In 1939, the company produced bat shaped mechanical pencils to celebrate the one hundredth anniversary of baseball.

In 1931, the company built a manufacturing plant on Houston Street in Atlanta.

During World War II Scripto became part of the war effort. At first, the company polished 75mm brass cannon shells. It then received a contract to manufacture ammunition pieces worth $1,094,000. This contract required the company to build a new factory and hire at least 250 to 300 new employees.

In 1947, the company hired James V. Carmichael as its president. Under Carmichael, the company became an international business and was the largest producer of writing instruments in the world. He would remain president until 1964 and stayed on the board of directors for several years later. During this time the company would go on to have production centers in Australia, Canada, England, and Southern Rhodesia.

=== Lighters ===
In 1955, the company began selling refillable lighters. Its first lighter model was called the Vu-Lighter. The Vu-Lighter was identical to the Ritepoint lighter and was rumored to be made in the same factory. The only difference was the name on the bottom. The second model was an innovation with an external pump button on the side of the tank.

Two years later the company acquired the Anja Engineering Corporation, a California company which also produced writing instruments and printed material. By this time, the company had expanded its facilities between Houston and Irwin Streets and built office and research facilities on Boulevard Street.

=== ICWU Strike ===
Beginning in 1963, the International Chemical Workers Union (ICWU) organized Scripto's workers into the union and the National Labor Relations Board recognized their representation on June 9, 1964. At the time Scripto had 950 employees, of which 836 were production or maintenance workers. 633 of the production and maintenance workers were black women. Most of these workers were making $400 per year below the federal poverty limit.

The ICWU called for a strike on November 27, 1964 claiming that Scripto's offer for a raise was discriminatory. The company had offered a four percent raise to skilled staff and a two percent raise to production and maintenance staff. At the time, there were six black workers in skilled staff positions and the union claimed that the company wouldn't promote blacks to skilled positions. On November 30, Martin Luther King Jr. and C.T. Vivian informed the company that the Southern Christian Leadership Conference (SCLC) supported the strikers and threatened to lead a boycott of the company's products. The company stated that the proposal was economic and not racially motivated.

In December, Carmichael negotiated with the union while King spent two days with the strikers. Vivian worked to form an alliance of the union and civil rights groups that he thought would help the strikers reach their demands. During this time the strike began to take on the feel of a civil rights protest. King walked the picket line with them on December 19 and addressed a rally of 250 strikers at Ebenezer Baptist Church on the 20th stating the SCLC was prepared to move forward with a boycott. On the 24th, the company and union reached their first agreement with the union dropping its boycott and the company paying the strikers their annual Christmas bonuses.

On January 9, 1965, Scripto and the ICWU announced a settlement. All employees would receive four cent an hour raised each year for the next three years. The company also agreed to re-hire 155 strikers and keep on their replacement workers. Although racial tensions eased at the plant some Atlanta leaders who had been somewhat sympathetic to King before the strike became less so after the boycott threats.

Later in 1965, Carl Singer was brought on as president of the company to oversee a reorganization and a change in direction.

=== End of independence ===
In 1973, Scripto stopped being an independent entity when it was acquired by the British firm Wilkinson Sword which was trying to diversify its interests. The next year, the company began a partnership with the Japanese firm of Tokai-Seiki to sell disposable lighters. In December 1977, the company moved its plant from Atlanta to Gwinnett County, Georgia. By 1978, the company was a subsidiary of Allegheny International, Inc. and K. Douglas Martin was its president.

In 1984, Scripto was acquired by Tokai-Seiki which had become the Tokai Corporation. In 1986 the company moved its headquarters to Rancho Cucamonga, California. At the same time, the company's Anja subsidiary built a new facility in Rancho Cucamonga and moved all of its staff there from Monrovia, California. Anja's facility was the first major writing production facility to be built in the United States in twenty years and would produce Scripto pens.

The company's name was changed to Scripto-Tokai in 1988 and its headquarters were moved to Fontana, California. Most of its production facilities were moved to Tijuana, Mexico, in 1989. The plant in Gwinnett County closed in 1994. Sometime after this the company stopped producing writing instruments and focused on lighters.

=== Today ===
In 2005, the Scripto brand, along with the sales, marketing and distribution of products, was sold to Calico Brands, a Japanese company primarily producing and selling disposable cigarette lighters. In 2006, the company's name was again changed, this time to Scripto, USA.

As of 2025, Scripto is a brand of the Calico brands of Tokai World and produces only lighters. The company is based in Ontario, California.

== Historic products ==
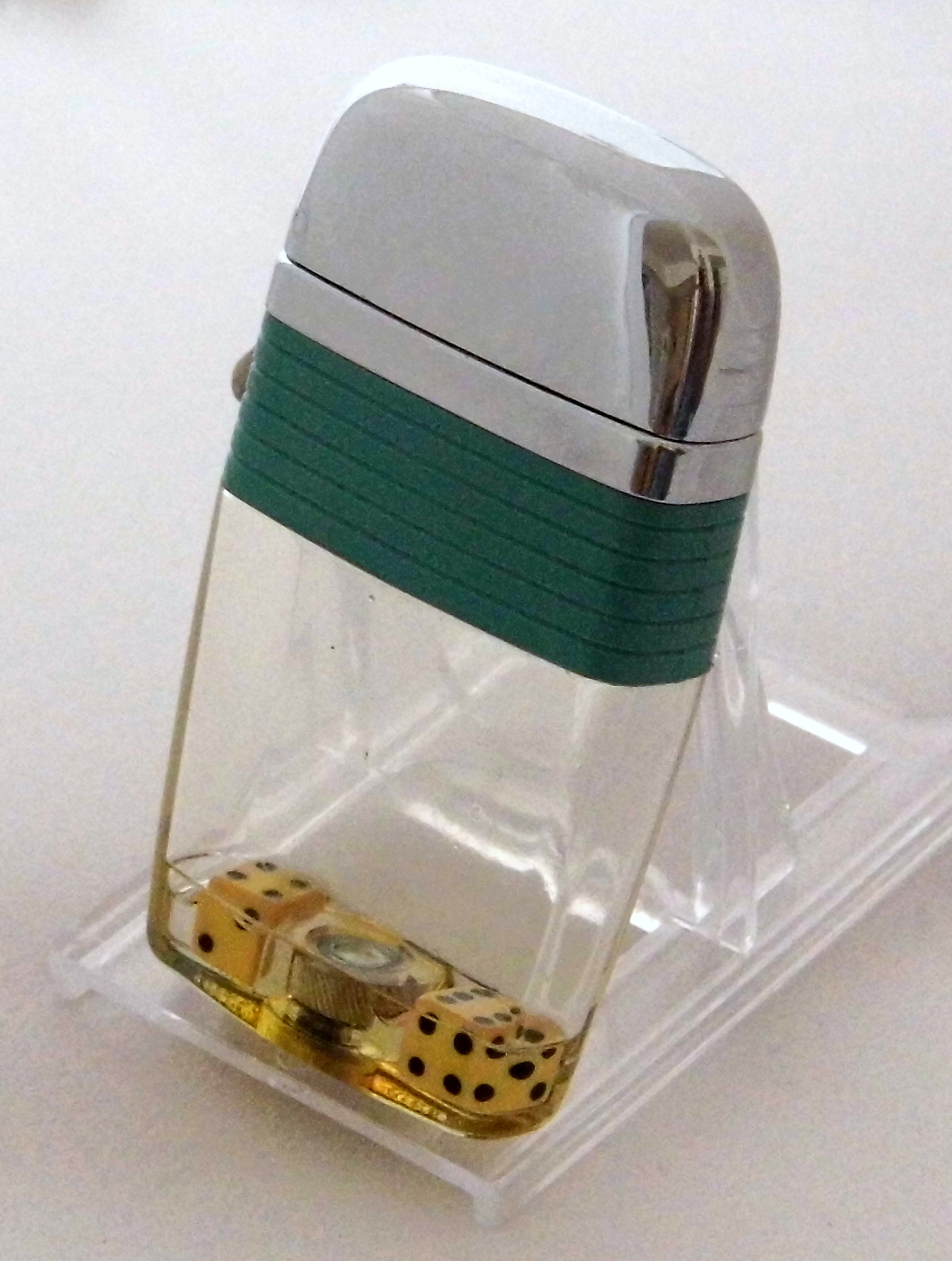
Scripto Vu lighter with transparent fluid compartment

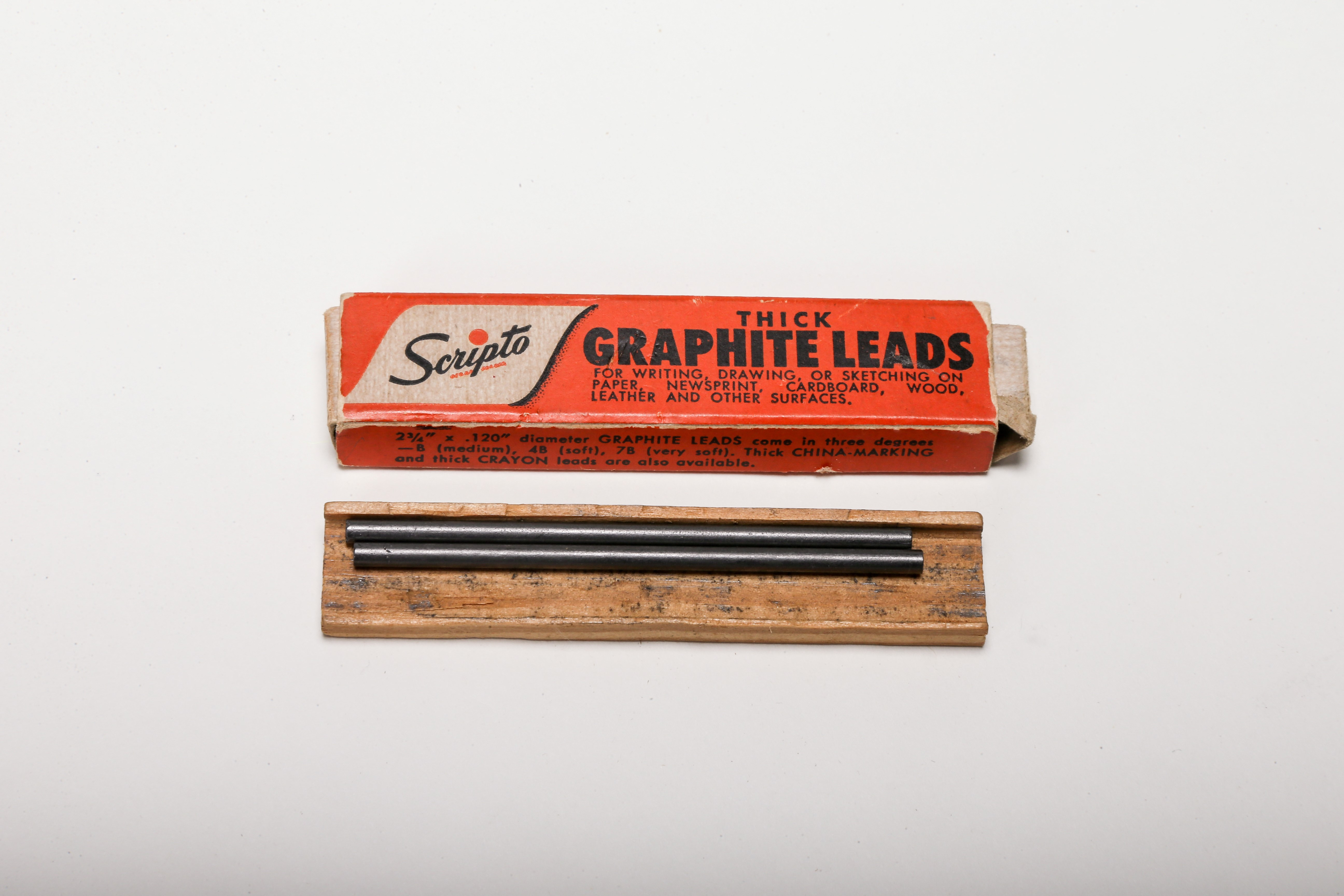
Scripto thick graphite leads

In 1955, Scripto was the first to introduce what it called Fluidlead. This was a pencil that wrote like a pen using liquid graphite. Another company, Parker Pens, had developed a similar product called Liquid Lead that was a few months behind Scripto in production. To avoid a costly patent fight the two companies agreed to share their formulas with each other on Valentine's Day of that year.

In 1980, Scripto produced its first erasable pen.

Other writing products included the Pussycat, Feathertone, Satellite, Prestige, Escort, Action, T210, K780, and the K21 pens.

The Vu lighter was the first see-through lighter. This allowed the user to see how much lighter fluid was left in it.

The Electra lighter, introduced in 1985, ignited the lighter fluid with an electric spark instead of the old spark wheel.

== Advertising ==
Scripto has had several notable people over the years advertise their products. In the 1960s, the company used a jingle by Tony Romeo in its advertising. In 1972, cartoonist Harvey Kurtzman appeared in a television advertisement for Scripto pens. Model Genevieve Chappell has appeared in advertisements for Scripto lighters.

== Notable court cases ==
=== Scripto v. Carson ===
In 1960, the company was involved in the far-reaching court case of Scripto, Inc. v. Carson which was decided by the U.S. Supreme Court. The court decided that the company was liable for collecting use tax in Florida even though it did not have facilities or employees in the state. It did have ten salesmen (who it equipped with catalogs and other items) who had specified territories and were only paid on commission. The court ruled that the company was operating in the state, even though it salesmen were not company employees.

=== Calles v. Scripto-Tokai Corporation ===
In 2003, Scripto was sued in Illinois court after the death of Jillian Calles, aged 3, when a fire was started by a sibling using the Aim N Flame lighter. The family claimed the product was defective because it did not have a child safety device. The trial court dismissed the case saying that Scripto did not violate any laws. The Calles family appealed to the Appellate Court which overruled the trial court's decision. Scripto appealed the Appellate Court's decision, and in 2007 the case made it to the Illinois Supreme Court. Illinois courts used two tests in product safety cases: the Consumer expectations test and the Risk-utility test. The Illinois Supreme Court ruled that the Aim N Flame passed the Consumer Expectation Test but not the Risk-Utility Test. This ruling affirmed the Appellate Court ruling and sent the case back to trial court. In 2010, Scripto settled the suit for $3.5 million.
