= Genevieve Chappell =

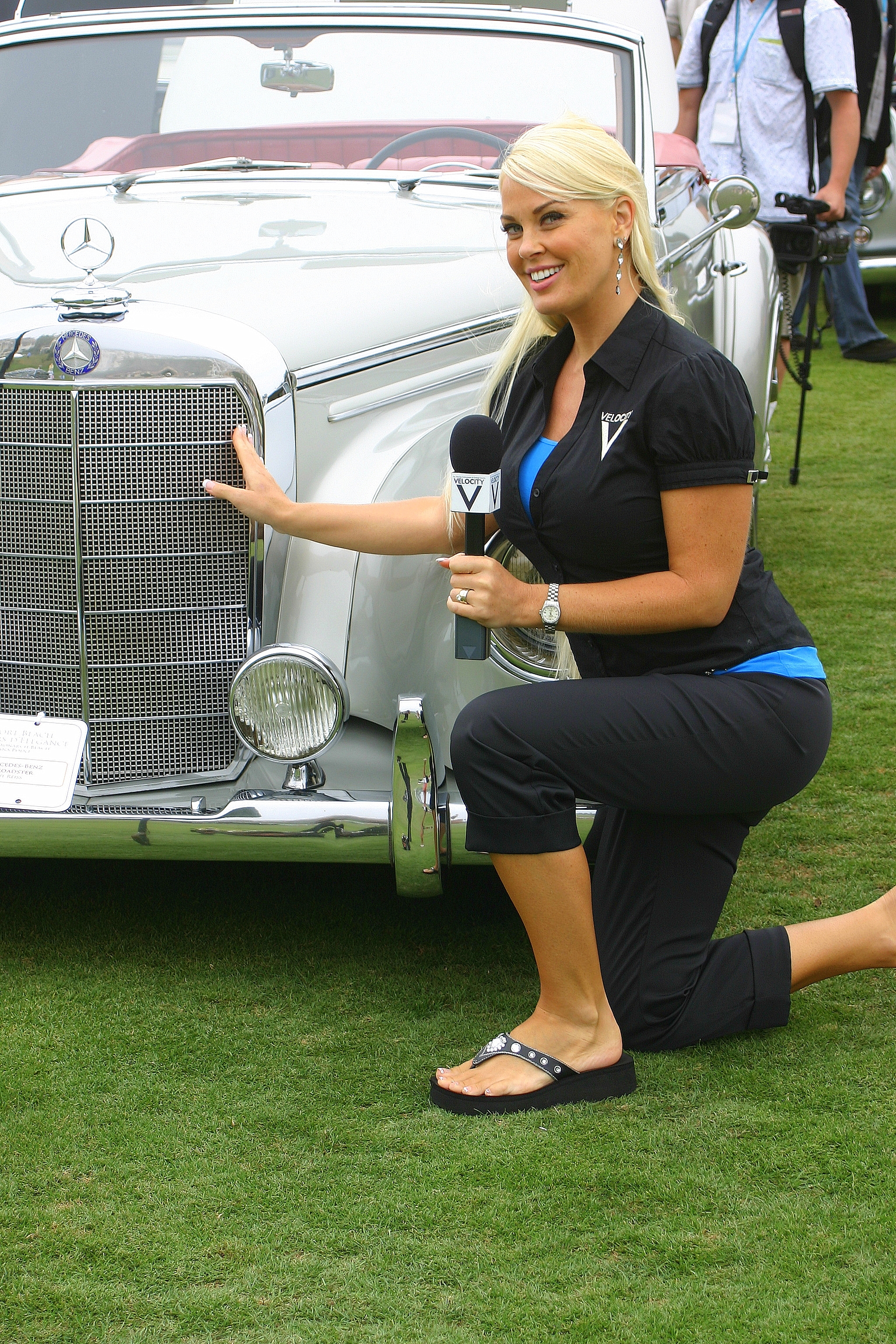
- Born: Genevieve Gael Chappell; October 18, 1972 (age 53); Anaheim, California, U.S.
- Occupations: Television producer, host, media personality, businesswoman
- Spouse: Mark Stitt
- Website: http://www.genevievechappell.com/

Genevieve Chappell (French: /Geneviève/; born October 18, 1972) is an American television personality, media personality, businesswoman and television producer.

== Early life ==
Genevieve Gael Chappell was born in Anaheim, California, to Bob and Lesley Chappell. Genevieve is the eldest of five children.

== Career ==
=== Spokesmodeling ===
When Chappell was 20 years of age she was approached by a representative for the St. Pauli Girl Brewery and asked to be the official St. Pauli Girl for Oktoberfest in Huntington Beach. There at the event she caught the eyes of other marketing representatives and began working as an official spokesmodel and poster girl for Budweiser USA. She also represented many automotive and motorsports companies as a narrator/spokesmodel at numerous trade shows and conventions around the United States and Canada. This led to bookings as a live emcee, narrator, and presenter with a variety of companies including Sony, Microsoft, SEMI Conductors, Qubica USA, IBM, and Hilton Hotels.

=== Modeling ===
Genevieve gained recognition from the print work she was doing as a spokesmodel. An agent approached her and suggested she put a composite card together along with a portfolio and pursue modeling. She took that advice and has since worked as a model for companies such as Disney, Intex H2O Toys, Von Dutch, Mission Hockey, NAPA Auto Parts, EBC Brakes, NHRA, Scripto Lighters, True Hardware, K&N Airfilter, NOS, Garrett Turbocharger, MSD 6A Ignition, along with many publications: fitness catalogues, bridal magazines, Hot Rod Magazine, Velocity Magazine, OC Family, Where OC and more.

=== Television ===
In the fall of 1999, Mission Hockey offered Chappell (their current female spokesmodel) a main role as a host in the company’s hockey commercial. WCEC Productions, the production company hired to produce the commercial, was based in San Diego, California. The producers liked Chappell's outgoing personality and knowledge of sports. Two months later, with no prior television hosting experience, the producers hired her on to host a syndicated sports show for San Diego Channel 4. She covered a wide range of sports, interviewing big time sports celebrities such as Los Angeles Lakers Kobe Bryant and Coach Phil Jackson, Olympic Stars; Christy Yamaguchi and Tara Lipinski, MLB's Tony Gwynn, skateboarding legend Tony Hawk, several wrestlers of the WWE and motocross stars from X-Games and Vans Triple Crown Motocross, along with athletes from the NHL, NBA, NFL and more.

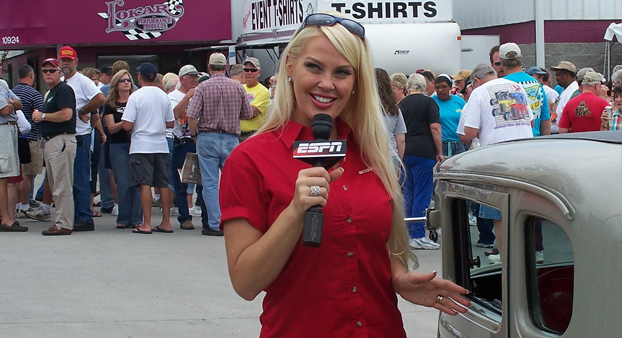
Chappell as host of ESPN's Garage Block

In May 2006, Genevieve became the first female host of Mothers Polish Car Show Series on ESPN. That same season she also hosted ESPN’s In the Drivers Seat where she worked alongside the father of drag racing “Big Daddy” Don Garlits. In 2007 Chappell hosted ESPN’s Mothers Polish Car Show Competition alongside co-hosts Griff Allen and David "Doc" Riley. The group traveled around the country covering custom car shows for the series. Because of her knowledge and passion for custom, classic and vintage cars, another call came in from ESPN executives which offered Chappell a position as a co-host, alongside Griff Allen on Bidding Wars, part of ESPN's Garage Block. In its first season, the program ran during the second quarter of 2007. The second season ran in the second quarter of 2008. In 2007, it was said to be ESPN2's highest rated program in its Saturday morning / Wednesday or Thursday afternoon motorsports block with a high rating of 4.1 - outperforming NASCAR Today. The program was voiced over by David "Doc" Riley, was hosted by Bill Stephens. The entire first and second seasons of programming were shot over the course of four days of the Labor Day weekend at the Kruse International Classic Car Auction and Show in Auburn, Indiana. For the 2008 broadcast season, Genevieve Chappell and Allen returned as co-hosts while Stephen Cox replaced Bill Stephens as the host.

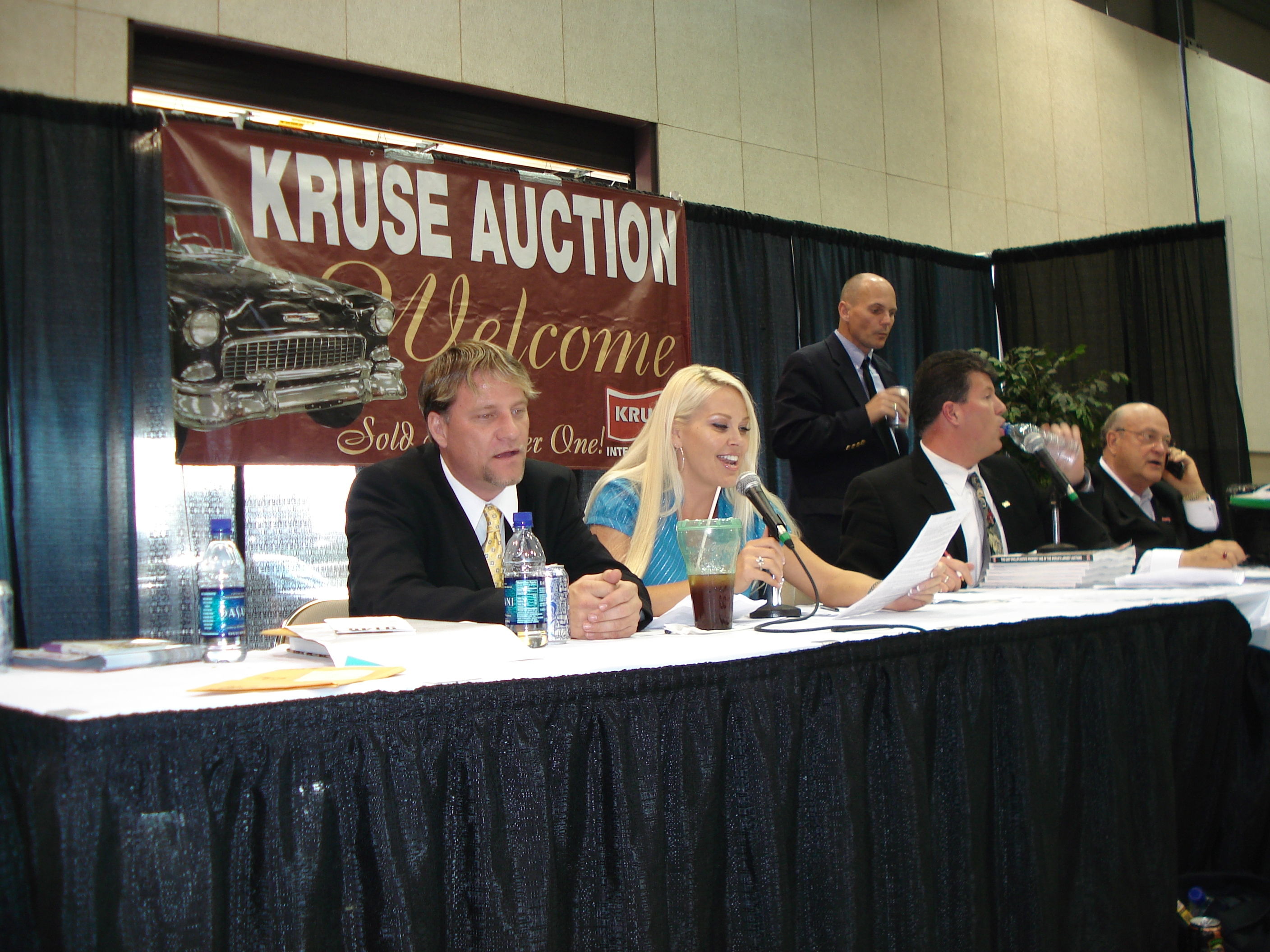
Chappell calling at the Kruse International Auction

In March 2008, Dean Kruse, the owner of Kruse International Auction house, and Vice President Fred Gittin offered Chappell to be the first woman ever to announce a Kruse classic car auction. She accepted and announced at the first annual Alabama Kruse auction later in March 2008. Next came an offer to be the host ESPN's Russo and Steele Classic Car Auction. Her co-hosts were Bill Stephens and Sports Car Market's Keith Martin. The program was shot in Scottsdale, Arizona, during the annual Auction Month in January 2008 and aired on ESPN from March 2008 till December 2008. The shows, which reached 91 million households, instantly made her the face of ESPN's automotive programming. Chappell states it was the ESPN executives and car customizers that gave her the nickname "The Queen Of Cars". Genevieve was also the pit reporter for the 2008 resurrection of the Mint 400, and used in the 2009 version of the event as well. In 2009, she was hired as a pit reporter for the Lucas Oil Off Road Series which will air on Speed Channel, Versus, and Outdoor Channel.

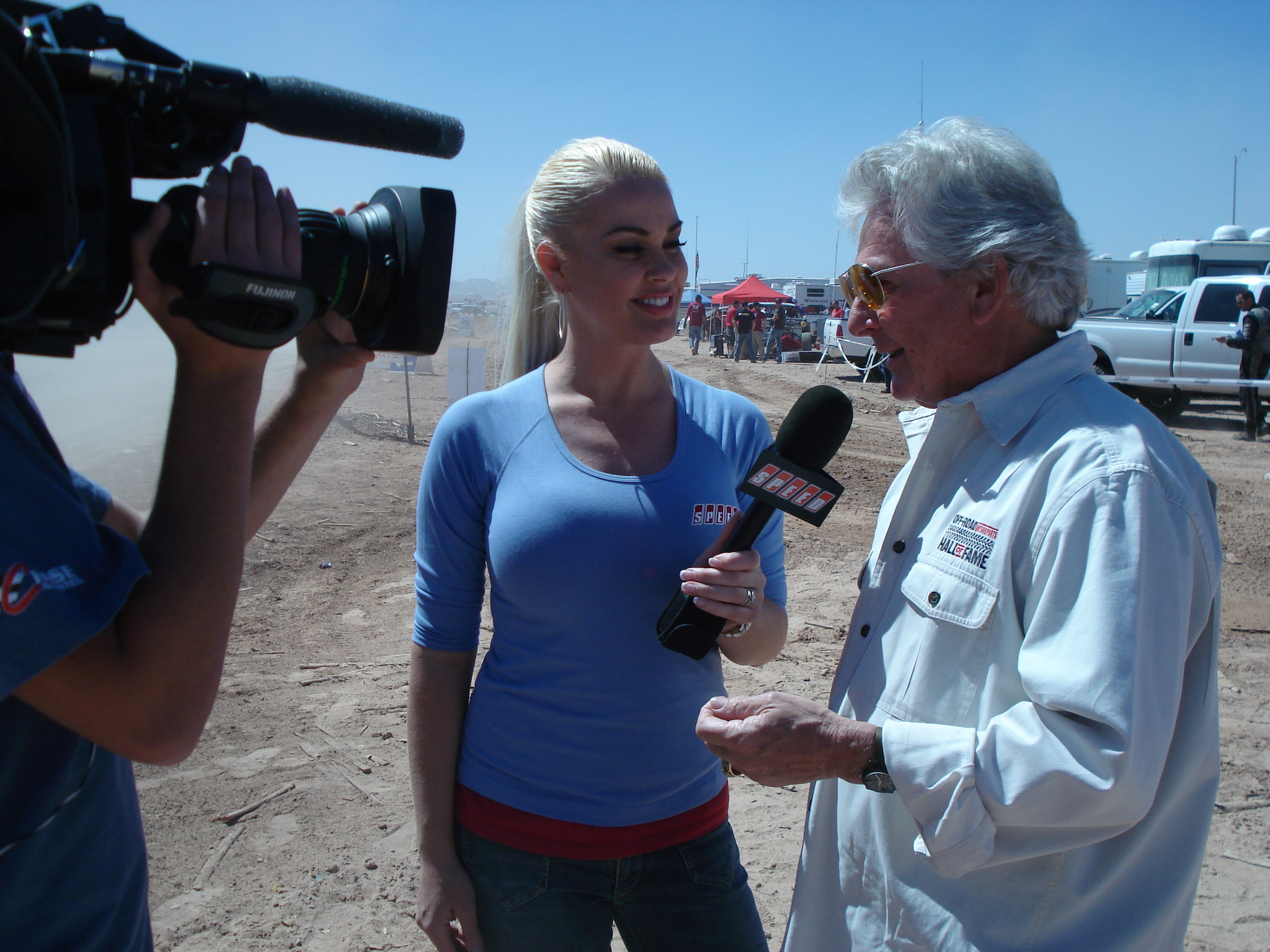
On location at the 2008 Mint 400

Her other automotive credits include numerous shows on Speed Channel as a pit reporter for Lucas Oil Motorsports Hour, Versus for Lucas Oil On The Edge, Treasure HD's Bonham's and Butterfeilds Live Auction series, World Of Trucks by the Outdoor Channel, ION Networks Lokar car Show Series and an online series for Velocity Magazine (Velocitymag.com/tv) called Velocity TV - which she created, produced and hosted. Chappell has hosted more automotive and motorsports programming on television than any other female.

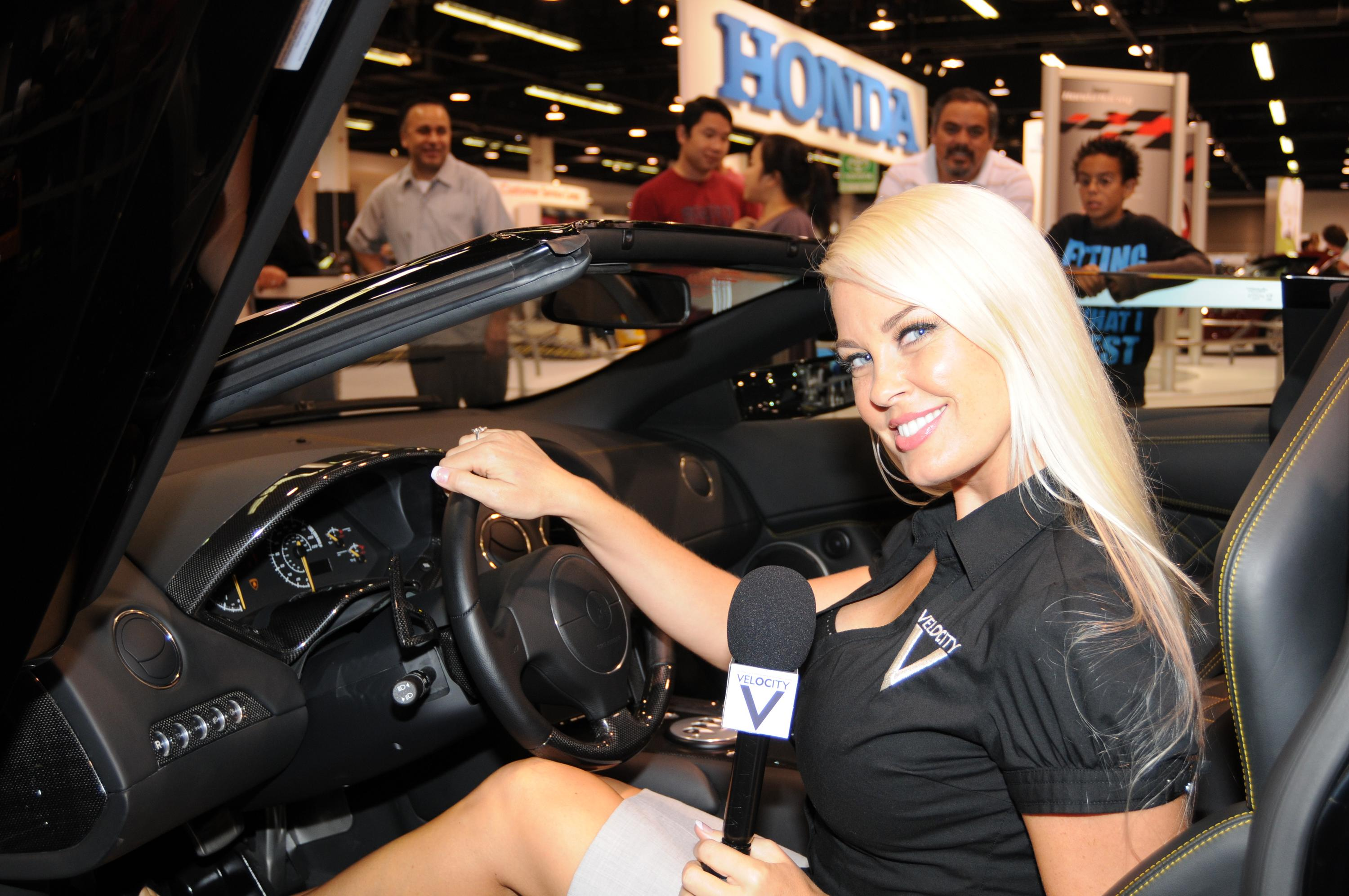
Chappell on location for Velocity Magazine

Through her television programming duties, Genevieve has worked with automotive legends Don Garlits, Rad Rides by Troy designer Troy Trepanier, Chip Foose, Tom McEween, John Force, The Force Family and Race Team, Mario Andretti, Tanner Foust, as well as co-hosts Bill Stephens, Stephen Cox, and Sports Car Market's Keith Martin. Genevieve's career has also garnered much press and attention, as she has been featured in Hot Rod, Hot Rod Deluxe, and Velocity Magazine in 2008. She also served as the Grand Marshal of the Great Pottsville Cruise, alongside Dennis Gage, host of SPEED Channels My Classic Car. She has also been featured in numerous non-automotive press throughout her television career.
