= Test (law) =

Commonly applied method of evaluation used to resolve matters of jurisprudence

In law, a test is a commonly applied method of evaluation used to resolve matters of jurisprudence. In the context of a trial, a hearing, discovery, or other kinds of legal proceedings, the resolution of certain questions of fact or law may hinge on the application of one or more legal tests.

Tests are often formulated from the logical analysis of a judicial decision or a court order where it appears that a finder of fact or the court made a particular decision after contemplating a well-defined set of circumstances. It is assumed that evaluating any given set of circumstances under a legal test will lead to an unambiguous and repeatable result.

== Kinds of legal tests ==
- Bright-line rule
- Balancing test

== International law ==
- Berne three-step test
- Habitual residence test
- Caroline test

== Common law ==
- "But-for" test
- "Real risk" test

== Canada ==
- Andrews test
- Air of reality test (see also R v Fontaine)
- Assumed Jurisdiction test
- Central management and control test
- Collins Test
- Community Standards of Tolerance test
- Conway Test
- Degradation or Dehumanization Test
- Denial of Bail test
- Gladue Test
- Grant Test (see also R v Suberu)
- Indecent conduct test (see also R v Kouri)
- Integral to Distinctive Culture test
- Interjurisdictional immunity
- Internal Necessities Test or Artistic Defense
- Meiorin test
- Law test
- Multiple Access test
- Necessarily incidental doctrine
- Oakes test
- Overbreadth test
- Patent unreasonableness test
- Pith and substance test (see also R v Morgentaler)
- Provincial Inability test
- Purpose and form test
- Real and Substantial Connection test
- Reasonableness Standard
- Sheppard Test
- Smithers test
- Sparrow test
- Test for Aboriginal Title
- Test for bias
- Test for confusion
- Test for detention
- Test for exclusion of evidence
- Test for the inclusion of hearsay evidence
- Test for materiality
- Test for material causation/contribution
- Test for new principle of fundamental justice
- Test for Infringement of Title
- Test for inducement or contributory patent infringement
- Tests for paramountcy – Express contradiction test & Frustrate the purpose test
- Test for patent infringement
- Test for peace, order, and good government (see also R v Crown Zellerbach Canada Ltd)
- Void for Vagueness test
- Waterfield Test
- Wigmore Test

== European Convention on Human Rights ==
- Necessary in a democratic society

== United Kingdom ==
- Bolam test
- Hicklin test
- Wednesbury unreasonableness test

== United States ==
- Aguilar-Spinelli test
- Bad tendency
- Calculus of negligence test (Hand rule)
- Clear and present danger
- Consumer expectations test
- Daubert standard
- Frye test
- Imminent lawless action
- Insurance bad faith test
- Lemon test
- McDonnell Douglas burden-shifting framework
- Miller test
  - SLAPS test
- Mt. Healthy test
- Risk-utility test
- Reasonable expectation of privacy
- Sherbert test
- Shocks the conscience test
- Wambaugh's inversion test
