= Black Power (disambiguation) =

Black power is a political slogan and a name for various associated ideologies aimed at achieving self-determination for people of African descent.

Black Power may also refer to:

== Activism and politics ==
- The Black Power movement, a political movement to achieve a form of Black Power in the second half of the 20th century in the US
- The Black Power Revolution, an attempt in Trinidad and Tobago to force socio-political change in 1970

== Other uses ==
- Black Power, 1954 book by African-American author Richard Wright
- Black Power (album), a 1994 release by Ralph Carney, Daved Hild, and Kramer
- Black Power (New Zealand gang), a prominent gang in New Zealand
- Black Power: The Politics of Liberation, a 1967 book by Kwame Ture (then known as Stokely Carmichael) and Charles V. Hamilton
- The Black Power Mixtape 1967–1975, a 2011 documentary film by Göran Olsson about the Black Power movement in the US

== See also ==
- 1968 Olympics Black Power salute
- 1972 Olympics Black Power salute
- Black Consciousness Movement, in South Africa
- Black Lives Matter, a decentralised worldwide movement starting in 2013
- Black movement in Brazil, a generic name covering 20th-century social movements in Brazil
- Black Power and the American Myth
- Black power fist
- Black Power Flower
- Black supremacism
- From Black Power to Hip Hop
- Negroes with Guns: Rob Williams and Black Power
