= Consumer-expectation test =

Legal test for determining manufacturer liability for a defective product

In legal disputes regarding product liability, a consumer-expectations test is used to determine whether the product is negligently manufactured or whether a warning on the product is defective. Under this test, the product is considered defective if a reasonable consumer would find it defective.

The test is typically applied to non-complex products which consumers might have expectations for. For example, consumers will typically not have specific safety expectations revolving around the design of landing gear on an airplane except for the fact that they do not want, or expect, to crash while the plane is landing.

A closely related test is risk-utility test. Traditionally, the risk-utility test was used for design defects, while the consumer expectation test was applied to manufacturing defects. However, some jurisdictions apply the consumer expectation test to design defects as well. See Calles v. Scripto-Tokai Corp., 2007 WL 495315 (Ill. Feb. 16, 2007).

The official definition of consumer expectation test: An unreasonably dangerous product is one that is dangerous to an extent beyond that which would be contemplated by the ordinary consumer who purchases it, with the ordinary knowledge common to the community of its characteristics.

This test is commonly applied in product liability cases in the United States.

== Examples ==
As an example, a reasonable consumer might find exposed blades on a lawnmower, without plastic guards that could be installed for pennies, to be defective because the risk of not having the plastic guards is higher than the costs of installing those guards.

Another example is a gun. A gun is designed to kill or maim its targets. Consequently, under the consumer-expectation test, there is no rhyme or reason for a gun to be safe. However, if a gun has a glitch that causes the bullet to be shot back at the firing shooter instead of the target, then the gun fails the consumer-expectation test.

== European Union ==
In the European Union, the European Council Directive on General Product Safety 2001/95/EC states (at Article 3(f)) that the conformance of a product to a general safety requirement shall be assessed taking into account "reasonable customer expectations regarding safety" (amongst other considerations).
