= Black Power and the American Myth =

1970 book by C. T. Vivian

- Title page for Black Power and the American Myth (1970)
- Author: C. T. Vivian
- Language: English
- Genre: Non-fiction
- Publisher: Fortress Press
- Publication date: 1970
- Publication place: United States

Black Power and the American Myth is a 1970 book by C. T. Vivian that analyzes the civil rights movement. Before writing the book, Vivian had been an activist, and a member of the Executive Staff of the Southern Christian Leadership Conference (SCLC), along with Martin Luther King Jr., Andrew Young, James Bevel and others. Vivian's access gave readers a first-hand account of the thoughts and motivations of the movement's leaders.

After its 1970 publication, Black Power and the American Myth became an Ebony Book Club selection and a bestseller.

== Content ==
Vivian credits King with successfully shifting white Americans' perceptions of the need for equal rights for African-Americans:

It was Martin Luther King who removed the Black struggle from the economic realm and placed it in a moral and spiritual context. It was on this plane that The Movement first confronted the conscience of the nation.

Vivian also describes the process through which the movement's leaders identified important goals and strategies:

In the initial planning stages of The Movement, the leaders identified five goals:

1. The creation of a new condition within the Black community.
2. Inclusion of the Black middle class in the struggle.
3. Bring about significant change in the values of the entire nation.
4. Initiate a new method of social action – that of non-violence.
5. It had to go all the way — there would be no turning back midway.
