= Russo and Steele =

Collector and classic car auction company

Russo and Steele Collector Automobile Auctions
- Industry: Collector Automobile Auctions
- Founded: Scottsdale, Arizona (2001)
- Founder: Drew and Josephine Alcazar
- Headquarters: Phoenix, Arizona, US
- Area served: Scottsdale, Arizona Monterey, California Newport Beach, California
- Key people: Drew Alcazar, CEO
- Products: Collector Automobiles
- Services: Auctions, Restorations, Events, Entertainment
- Owner: Drew and Josephine Alcazar
- Website: russoandsteele.com

Russo and Steele is an American collector and classic car auction company that is headquartered in Phoenix, Arizona. The company specializes in the sale of European sports cars, American muscle cars, hot rods and Custom cars. The company was founded in 2001 by Drew and Josephine Alcazar. The company held its first events in Scottsdale, Arizona and in Monterey, California. The company has since added auctions in Amelia Island, Florida. Typical auctions are held in outdoor locations where prospective bidders can inspect and bid on cars directly in an "auctions in the round” format.

At a 2010 event, an 800-foot-long auction tent fell over due to strong winds, striking several cars and causing an estimated $1.5 million in damages. A reality show on ESPN aired following the storm documenting the company's recovery.
