= C. T. Vivian =

American minister, writer, and civil rights activist (1924–2020)

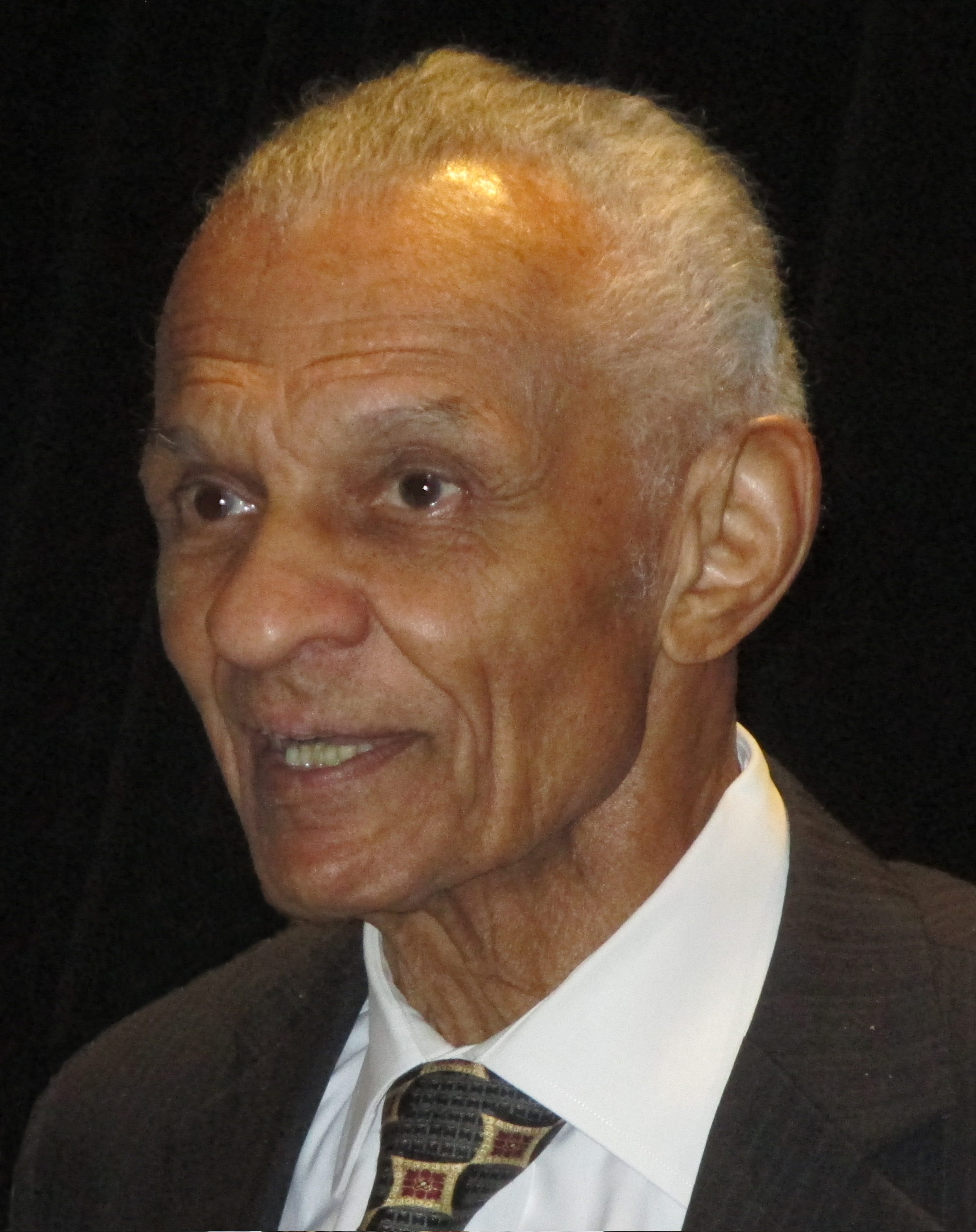
- C. T. Vivian in September 2015
- Born: Cordy Tindell Vivian; July 30, 1924; Boonville, Missouri, U.S.
- Died: July 17, 2020 (aged 95); Atlanta, Georgia, U.S.
- Resting place: Westview Cemetery, Atlanta, Georgia
- Occupations: Minister; author

Cordy Tindell Vivian (July 30, 1924 – July 17, 2020) was an American minister, author, and close friend and lieutenant of Martin Luther King Jr. during the civil rights movement. He resided in Atlanta, Georgia, and founded the C. T. Vivian Leadership Institute, Inc. He was a member of the Alpha Phi Alpha fraternity.

Senator Barack Obama, speaking at Selma's Brown Chapel on the March 2007, anniversary of the 1965 Selma to Montgomery marches, referred to Vivian in his opening remarks in the words of Martin L. King Jr. as "the greatest preacher to ever live."

== Early life ==
Vivian was born in Boonville, Missouri, on July 30, 1924. As a small boy he migrated with his mother to Macomb, Illinois, where he attended Lincoln Grade School and Edison Junior High School. Vivian graduated from Macomb High School in 1942 and attended Western Illinois University in Macomb, where he worked as the sports editor for the school newspaper. His first professional job was recreation director for the Carver Community Center in Peoria, Illinois. There, Vivian participated in his first sit-in demonstrations, which successfully integrated Barton's Cafeteria in 1947.

== Career ==
Studying for the ministry at American Baptist Theological Seminary (now called American Baptist College) in Nashville, Tennessee, in 1959, Vivian met James Lawson, who was teaching Mohandas Gandhi's nonviolent direct action strategy to the Nashville Student Movement. Soon Lawson's students, including Diane Nash, Bernard Lafayette, James Bevel, John Lewis and others from American Baptist, Fisk University and Tennessee State University, organized a systematic nonviolent sit-in campaign at local lunch counters. On April 19, 1960, 4,000 demonstrators peacefully walked to Nashville's City Hall, where Vivian and Diane Nash discussed the situation with Nashville Mayor Ben West. As a result, Mayor West publicly agreed that racial discrimination was morally wrong. Many of the students who participated in the Nashville Student Movement soon took on major leadership roles in both the Student Nonviolent Coordinating Committee (SNCC) and the Southern Christian Leadership Conference (SCLC).

Vivian helped found the Nashville Christian Leadership Conference, and helped organize the first sit-ins in Nashville in 1960 and the first civil rights march in 1961. In 1961, Vivian participated in Freedom Rides. He worked alongside Martin Luther King Jr. as the national director of affiliates for the SCLC. In this position, he was a vocal supporter of the strikers during the 1964–1965 Scripto strike in Atlanta. In 1965 Vivian and a crowd of about 70 African American voters marched to the Dallas County Courthouse in Alabama to register to vote following a court order allowing them to do so. However, when they arrived Sheriff Jim Clark (sheriff) of Dallas County stopped them from entering. Following this Vivian got into a heated conversation with Clark which ended in him being arrested and then released shortly after. During the summer following the Selma Voting Rights Movement, Vivian conceived and directed an educational program, Vision, and put 702 Alabama students in college with scholarships (this program later became Upward Bound).

His 1970 Black Power and the American Myth was the first book on the Civil Rights Movement by a member of Martin Luther King's staff. In the 1970s Vivian moved to Atlanta, and in 1977 founded the Black Action Strategies and Information Center (BASIC), a consultancy on multiculturalism and race relations in the workplace and other contexts. In 1979 he co-founded, with Anne Braden, the Center for Democratic Renewal (initially as the National Anti-Klan Network), an organization where blacks and whites worked together in response to white supremacist activity. In 1984 he served in Jesse Jackson's presidential campaign, as the national deputy director for clergy. In 1994 he helped to establish, and served on the board of Capitol City Bank and Trust Co., a black-owned Atlanta bank. He also served on the board of Every Church a Peace Church.

External videos
- “Eyes on the Prize; Interview with C.T. Vivian” conducted in 1986 for the Eyes on the Prize documentary.

Vivian continued to speak publicly and offer workshops, and did so at many conferences around the country and the world, including with the United Nations. He was featured as an activist and an analyst in the civil rights documentary Eyes on the Prize, and was featured in a PBS special, The Healing Ministry of Dr. C. T. Vivian. He made numerous appearances on Oprah as well as the Montel Williams Show and Donahue. He was the focus of the biography Challenge and Change: The Story of Civil Rights Activist C.T. Vivian by Lydia Walker.

In 2008, Vivian founded and incorporated the C. T. Vivian Leadership Institute, Inc. (CTVLI) to "Create a Model Leadership Culture in Atlanta" Georgia. The C. T. Vivian Leadership Institute conceived, developed and implemented the "Yes, We Care" campaign on December 18, 2008 (four days after the City of Atlanta turned the water off at Morris Brown College (MBC)) and, over a period of two and a half months, mobilized the Atlanta community to donate in excess of $500,000 directly to Morris Brown as "bridge funding." That effort saved the Historically Black College or University (HBCU) and allowed the college to negotiate with the city which ultimately restored the water services to the college.

In 2018, Vivian donated his collection of 6,000 volumes of books largely about the black experience and written by black authors to the National Monuments Foundation for inclusion in the Peace Column, the centerpiece of the upcoming Rodney Cook Sr. Park in Vine City. The C.T. Vivian Library will be housed within the base of the 110-foot column.

== Later life ==
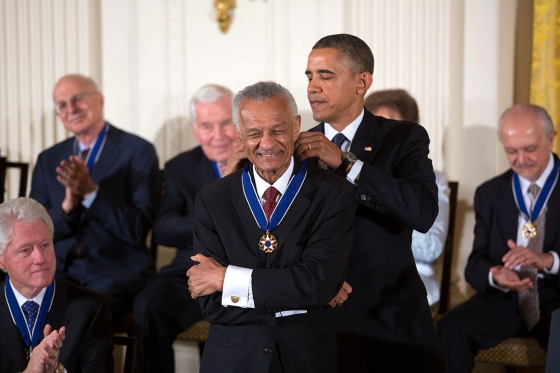
Vivian receiving the Presidential Medal of Freedom

On August 8, 2013, President Barack Obama named Vivian as a recipient of the Presidential Medal of Freedom. The citation in the press release reads as follows:

C. T. Vivian is a distinguished minister, author, and organizer. A leader in the Civil Rights Movement and friend to Martin Luther King, Jr., he participated in Freedom Rides and sit-ins across our country. Vivian also helped found numerous civil rights organizations, including Vision, the National Anti-Klan Network, and the Center for Democratic Renewal. In 2012, he returned to serve as interim President of the Southern Christian Leadership Conference.

Vivian died from natural causes in Atlanta on July 17, 2020, thirteen days before his 96th birthday, and on the same day when his friend and fellow activist, John Lewis, died in the same city. He was the first Black, non-elected man to lie in state at the Georgia State Capitol. He was buried at Westview Cemetery in Atlanta.

On July 1, 2021, Peoria, Illinois' Thomas Jefferson Primary School was renamed to Dr. C. T. Vivian Primary School. On April 15, 2026, a portion of Florence Avenue in Peoria was dedicated as Dr. C. T. Vivian Avenue.

== Works ==
- Black Power and the American Myth (1970)

== See also ==
- List of civil rights leaders
- James Parks Morton Interfaith Award
