= Stanley Harrold =

American historian

Stanley Harrold (born October 16, 1946) is a professor of history and an author in the United States. He teaches at South Carolina State University. He has written eight books about abolitionism and the struggle against slavery in the U.S.

== Bibliography ==
- Border War: Fighting Over Slavery Before the Civil War, University of North Carolina Press (2010)
- The Abolitionists and the South, 1831-1861, University Press of Kentucky (1995)
- Antislavery Violence: Sectional, Racial, and Cultural Conflict in Antebellum America, edited with John R. McKivigan University of Tennessee Press (1999)
- The African-American Odyssey, with Darlene Clark Hine and William C. Hine, Prentice-Hall (2000)
- American Abolitionists, Longman, (2000)
- Subversives: Antislavery Community in Washington, D.C., 1828-1865, Louisiana State University Press (2003)
  - Review of Subversives: Antislavery Community in Washington, D.C., 1828-1865, Journal of Southern History, 70(2), (2002) pages 423-424
- The Rise of Aggressive Abolitionism: Addresses to the Slaves, University Press of Kentucky (2004)
  - Review of The Rise of Aggressive Abolitionism
- African Americans: A Concise History, with Darlene Clark Hine and William C. Hine, Pearson Prentice Hall (2004)
- Civil War and Reconstruction: A Documentary Reader, editor, Blackwell, (2007)
- Gamaliel Bailey and Antislavery Union, Kent State University Press (1986)
- He also co-edited the book series “Southern Dissent”, University Press of Florida, (1999 - ?)
