= Carl Singer =

American businessman and investor

Carl N. Singer (September 6, 1916 – August 7, 2008) was an American businessman, investor and philanthropist. He specialized in trouble-shooting, identifying problems associated with business management, and restoring financial stability to business organizations.

Singer served on the board of directors for over 30 companies, including Equipment Company of America, Vermont Contract Furnishings Co., Canrad, Inc., Taco Viva, Inc., FastDue.com, Timberland Industries, and PeopleClaim.com. He also held executive roles with Sealy, Inc., Scripto, Inc., the B.V.D. Company and Renfield Importers. He was the founder and chair of Fundamental Management Corporation.

Singer served as a board of trustees member at Emory University in Atlanta, Georgia, and was an active member of the Friends for Life at the University of Miami, and the Renaissance Group of Dartmouth-Hitchcock Medical Center in New Hampshire.

As a result of his philanthropy, was recognized by the Center for Medical Education at the University of Miami. In 2007, he was awarded the honorary degree of Doctor of Commerce by the Huizenga School of Business and Entrepreneurship at Nova Southeastern University in Ft. Lauderdale, FL.

Singer died on August 7, 2008, at age 91. His wife of 69 years, Marion S. Singer, died in 2011. He is survived by two children, David and Phyllis, four grandchildren, and five great-grandchildren.

He is listed in Who's Who in America, Who's Who in Finance and Industry, and Who's Who International.
