= Risk-utility test =

Legal test for determining if a product is defective

A risk-utility test is a test used in product liability legal disputes to determine whether a product's design or warning is defective, thereby making the manufacturer liable for injuries caused by its product.

The manufacturer is held liable under the risk-utility test if the probability of injury times the gravity of injury under the current product design is more than the cost of a reasonable-alternative design plus the diminished utility resulting from modifying the design.

More simply, the court considers if the economic costs (determined from likely lawsuits) are higher than the cost of changing the product design (ex: installing a plastic guard) plus the loss of use of the product (ex: the new guard makes it harder to use the product).

Generally, the simplest way to think of the risk-utility test is the Hand Formula applied to products.

The Third Restatement of the Law, Torts: Products Liability §2(b) favors the risk-utility test over the Second Restatement of the Law, Torts §402(a), which favored the consumer expectations test. §2(b) states, in part, "A product is defective when, at the time of sale or distribution...is defective in design. A product is defective in design when the foreseeable risks of harm posed by the product could have been reduced or avoided by the adoption of a reasonable alternative design by the seller or other distributor, or a predecessor in the commercial chain of distribution, and the omission of the alternative design renders the product not reasonably safe."
