= List of protests in Nigeria =

This is a list of protests in Nigeria, from the colonial rule to present day.

Year	Day	Name	People	Location	Notes	Image
1929	6 December	Aba Women's Riot	Igbo women	Eastern Nigeria	The women protested against tax levies imposed by the colonial government. It led to the death of many of the women.	
1947	27 November	Abeokuta Women's Revolt	Abeokuta Women's Union; Funmilayo Ransome-Kuti	Alake's Palace, Abeokuta	The women protested against an unfair tax regime which led to the abdication of the then Alake of Egbaland, Oba Sir Ladapo Ademola II and the abolition of the tax regime by the colonial government.	
1978	17 April	Ali Must Go	Segun Okeowo; Ahmadu Ali	Universities nationwide	A 50 kobo increase in student fees sparked the protests.	
1989	24 May - June	Anti-SAP riots	National Union of Nigerian Students	Universities nationwide	The protests occurred as a result of the effects of the International Monetary Fund (IMF)-imposed Structural Adjustment Program (SAP) introduced by the Ibrahim Babangida-led government.	
1993		June 12 Protests	Nigerians	South West Nigeria	The protests occurred as an aftermath of the annulment of the June 12, 1993 Presidential elections by Ibrahim Babangida.	
2012	2-14 January	Occupy Nigeria	Nigerians	Nigeria (including the diaspora)	Nigerians protested against the removal of fuel subsidies and eventual price hikes by the Goodluck Jonathan government. It led to the reinstatement of the subsidy and a review of the Federal Government spending.	
2020		End SARS	Nigerians	Nigeria (including the diaspora)	The protests are against police brutality meted out by a now-defunct specialised police unit known as the Special Anti-Robbery Squad (SARS). A memorial protest was held on 20 October 2021 to mark the first anniversary of the October 2020 Lekki toll gate shooting.	Protesters at the endSARS protest in Lagos, Nigeria 92 - cropped
2024	1-10 August	End Bad Governance in Nigeria	Nigerians	Nigeria (including the diaspora	Nationwide protest over the rising cost of living since the beginning of President Bola Ahmed Tinubu's administration in May 2023. The protests were mainly over fuel subsidy removal, hike in electricity tariffs and customs duties, hunger and insecurity among others.	
