= List of strikes in Nigeria =

Throughout the history of Nigeria, a number of strikes, labour disputes, student strikes, hunger strikes, and other industrial actions have occurred.

== Background ==
A labour strike is a work stoppage caused by the mass refusal of employees to work. This can include wildcat strikes, which are done without union authorisation, and slowdown strikes, where workers reduce their productivity while still carrying out minimal working duties. It is usually a response to employee grievances, such as low pay or poor working conditions. Strikes can also occur to demonstrate solidarity with workers in other workplaces or pressure governments to change policies.

== 19th century ==
- 1897 Lagos strike

== 20th century ==
=== 1940s ===
- 1940–41 LMWA protest, including a strike, by the Lagos Market Women Association against income tax.
- 1944 King's College strike, strike by students at King's College, Lagos.
- 1945 Nigerian general strike
- 1949 Enugu Colliery Massacre

=== 1960s ===
- 1963 Nigerian general strike, in the Federation of Nigeria.
- 1964 Nigerian general strike
- 1964 Nigerian teachers' strike

=== 1970s ===
- Ali Must Go

=== 1980s ===
- 1981 Nigerian general strike
- 1982 Nigerian dockworkers' strikes
- 1988 ASUU strike, strike by Academic Staff Union of Universities members in Nigeria against structural adjustment, the first strike in the union's history.
- 1988 Nigerian fuel strikes, series of strikes in Nigeria protesting increases in fuel prices.
- 1989 Anti-SAP riots

=== 1990s ===
- 1994 Nigerian oil strike, strike by oil workers after the arrest of opposition leader Moshood Abiola.

== 21st century ==
=== 2000s ===
- 2003 Nigerian general strike, against increases in fuel prices.

=== 2010s ===
- Occupy Nigeria
- 2013 Nigerian university strike, 5-month strike organised by the Academic Staff Union of Universities.
- 2018 Nigerian university strike, organised by the Academic Staff Union of Universities.

=== 2020s ===
- 2021 Nigerian doctors' strike
- 2022 Nigerian breadmakers strike: strike by Premium Breadmakers Association of Nigeria workers over increases in the cost of breadmaking materials;
- 2022 Nigerian university strike: strike by members of the Academic Staff Union of Universities;
- 2023 Nigerian airport strikes;
- 2024 NARTO strike, organised by the Nigerian Association of Road Transport Owners demanding an increase in freight charges.
- 2024 Nigerian general strike

== See also ==
- List of protests in Nigeria
- History of Nigeria
