= Student protest =

Wide range of activities that indicate student dissatisfaction

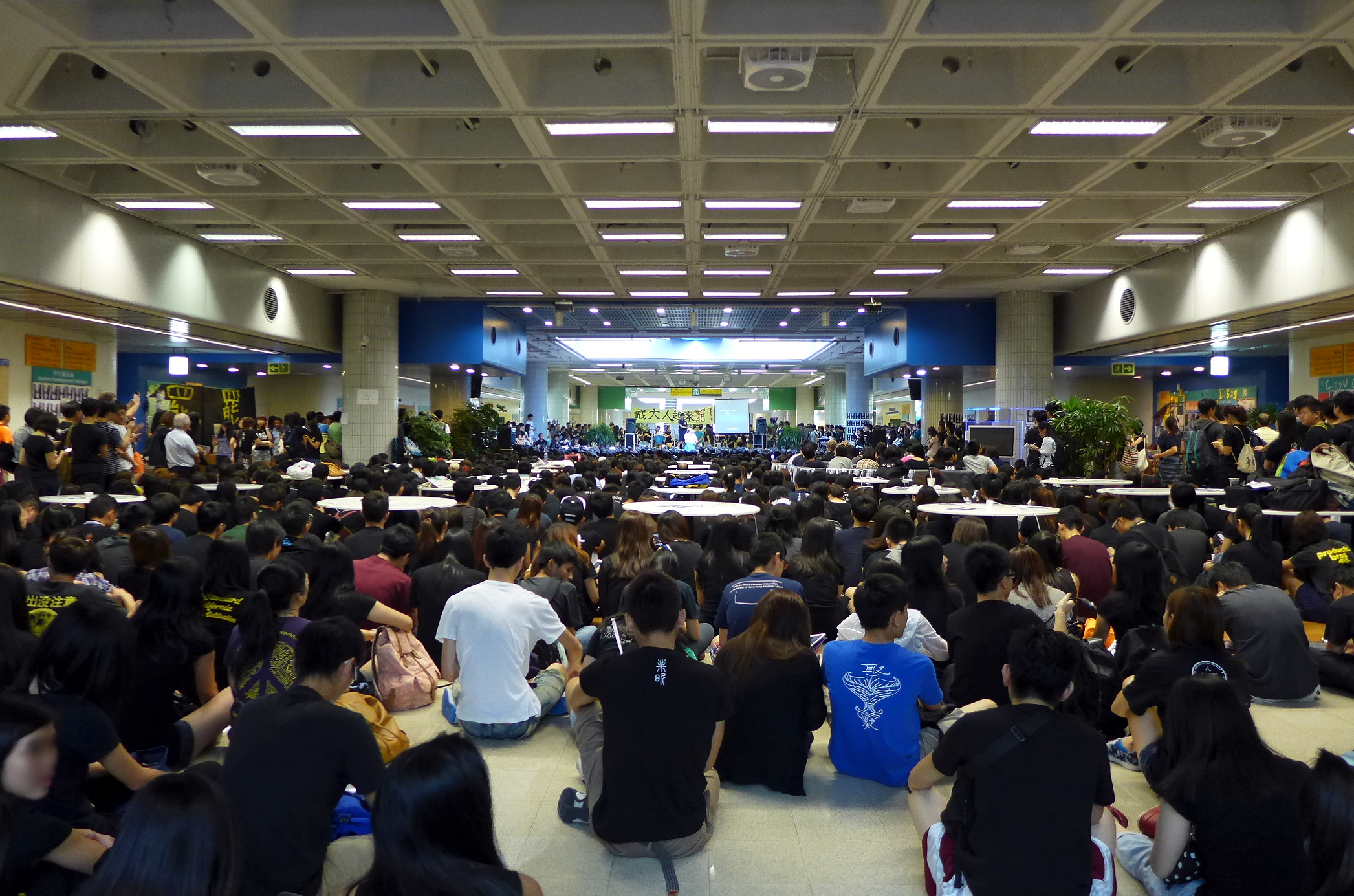
City University of Hong Kong students staging a sit-in during 2014 Hong Kong protests over blocking of electoral reforms

Student protest or campus protest is a form of student activism that takes the form of protest at university campuses. Such protests encompass a wide range of activities that indicate student dissatisfaction with a given political or academics issue and mobilization to communicate this dissatisfaction to the authorities (university or civil or both) and society in general and hopefully remedy the problem. Protest forms include but are not limited to: sit-ins, occupations of university offices or buildings, strikes etc. More extreme forms include suicide such as the case of Jan Palach's, and Jan Zajíc's protests against the end of the Prague Spring and Kostas Georgakis' protest against the Greek junta of 1967–1974.

== History ==
In the West, student protests such as strikes date to the early days of universities in the Middle Ages, with some of the earliest being the University of Oxford strike of 1209, and the University of Paris strike of 1229, which lasted two years.

More widespread student demonstrations occurred in 19th-century Europe, for example in Imperial Russia.

=== 20th century ===
Protests at historically black colleges included Shaw University (1919), Fisk University (1924–1925), Howard University (1925) and Hampton Institute (1925, 1927). The protests often involved civil rights issues between black students and white administrators. In the 1930s, some Jewish students in Poland protested against anti-Semitic ghetto benches legislation.

In the second half of the 20th century, significant demonstrations almost-simultaneously in many countries: the May 68 events in France began as a series of student strikes; Polish political crisis that occurred the same year also saw a major student activism; and the Mexican Movement of 1968 also started with students. The largest student strike in the history of the United States occurred in May and June 1970, in the aftermath of the American invasion of Cambodia and the killings of student protesters at Kent State University in Ohio. An estimated four million students at more than 450 universities, colleges and high schools participated in what became known as the Student strike of 1970.

It has been argued that student strikes and activism have a similarly long history in Confucian Asia.

=== 21st century ===
A peak of activism ignited in 2013 across college campuses nationally with a movement known as the new Campus Anti-Rape Movement (CARM). This insurgence of student activism put the political issue of campus rape back into the national conversation. Uniquely, with the growing digital world in the early 21st century, this movement was able to accomplish what decades of activism in the realm of college campus sexual assault hadn't previously through the use of social media and networking. In a 2020 literature review by Bovill et al., researchers found that student activism can effectively alter campus policies, this is especially true against sexual violence on college campuses and how universities mishandle complaints. The researchers found that student-led movements engaging in visible protests can be particularly effective. Additionally, researchers recommended that rather than perceive student activism as a threat to their respective institutions, universities should work alongside their students, so students feel comfortable expressing their opinions and potential solutions.

Starting April 2024, a wave of college protests began following mass arrests at a Columbia University protest. Students and faculty at dozens of universities protested the ongoing Israel's Gaza War, seeking for college institutions to divest from pro-Israeli causes.

Starting at the end of 2024, some have declared the student protests in Serbia to be the biggest student-led movement in Europe since 1968.

After 15 years dictatorship, Bangladesh's prime minister Sheikh Hasina stepped down on August 5, 2024 after hundreds of students broke a military curfew and attacked her official residence, achieving a victory that cost more than 1,400 lives in 36 days.

== Participation and issues ==
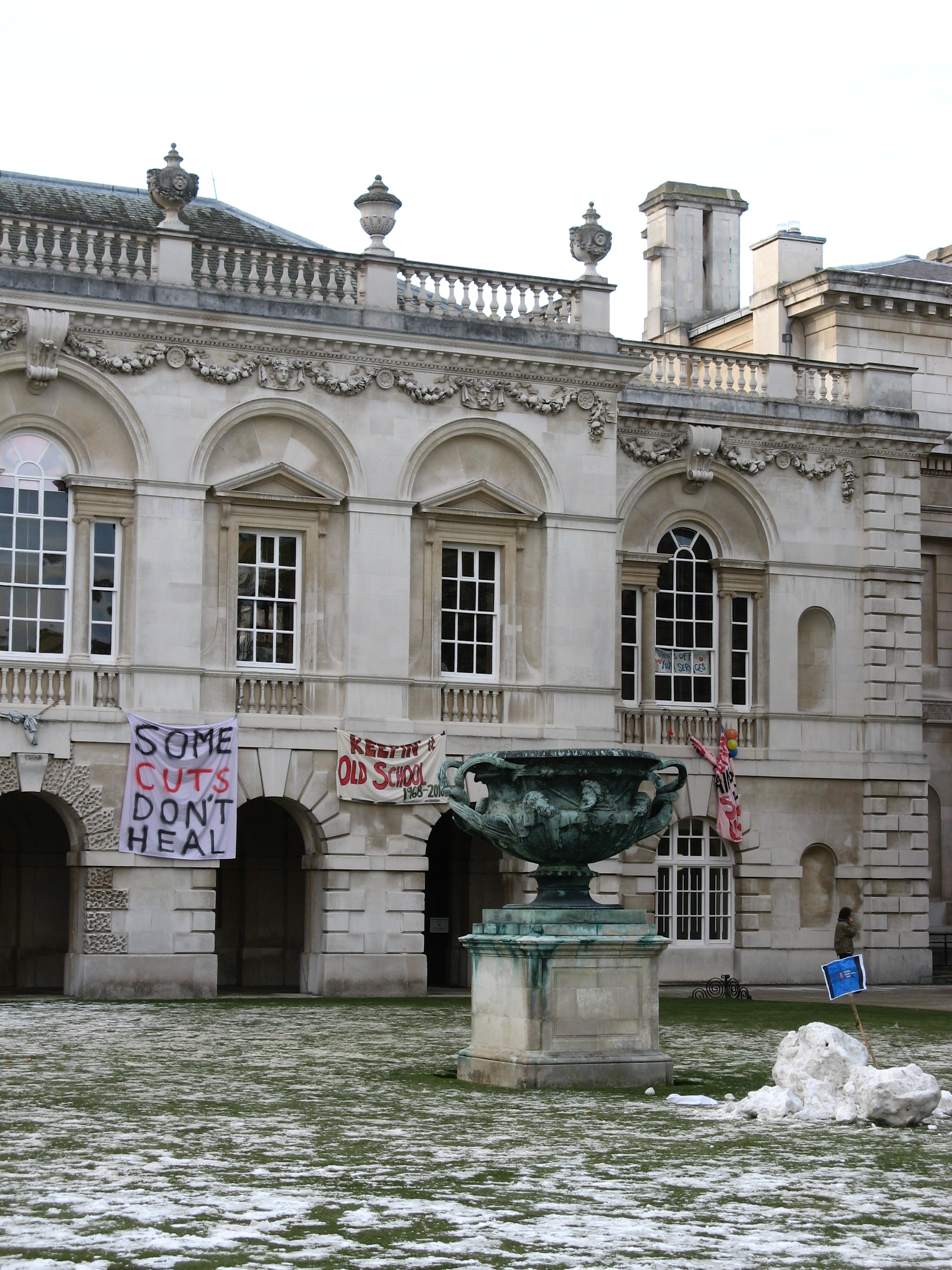
Student occupation at Cambridge University, 2010

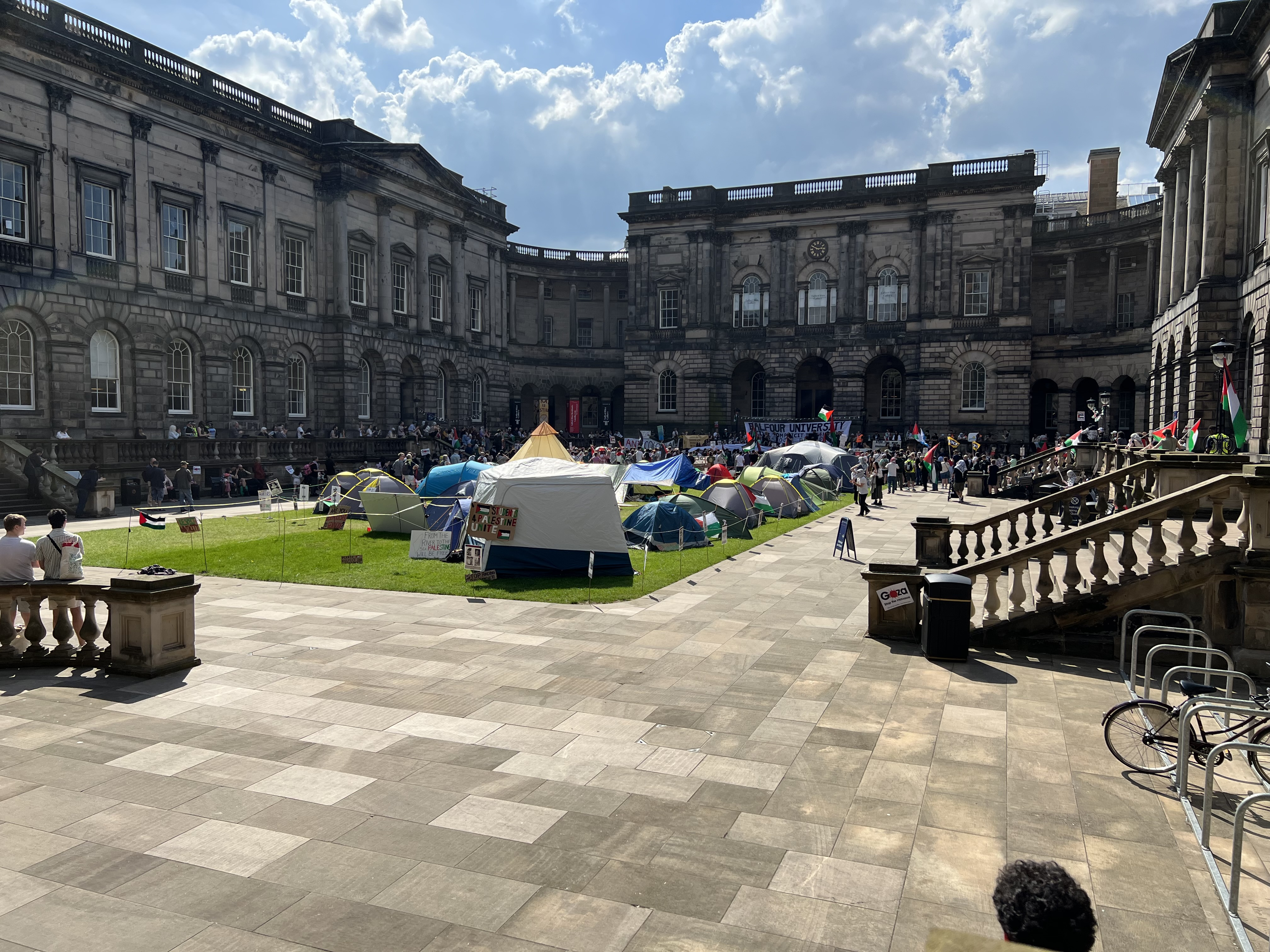
Edinburgh University student Gaza protest, Old College Quad encampment, May 2024.

Early studies of campus protests conducted in the United States in the mid-1960s suggested that students who were more likely to take part in the protests tended to come from middle class and upper middle class backgrounds, major in social sciences and humanities, and come from families with liberal political views. Later studies from early 1970s, however, suggested that participation in protests was broader, through still more likely for students from social sciences and humanities than more vocational-oriented fields like economy or engineering. Student protesters were also more likely to describe themselves as having liberal or centrist political beliefs, and feeling politically alienated, lacking confidence in the party system and public officials.

Early campus protests in the United States were described as left-leaning and liberal. More recent research shares a similar view, suggesting that right-leaning, conservative students and faculty are less likely to organize or join campus protests. A study of campus protests in the United States in the early 1990s identified major themes for approximately 60% of over two hundred incidents covered by media as multiculturalism and identity struggle, or in more detail as racial and ethnic struggle, women's concerns, or gay rights activities and represent what recent scholars have described both affectionately and pejoratively as "culture/cultural wars," "campus wars," "multicultural unrest," or "identity politics"... The remaining examples of student protest concerned funding (including tuition concerns), governance, world affairs, and environmental causes".

While less common, protests similar to campus protests can also happen at secondary-level education facilities, like high schools.

== Forms ==
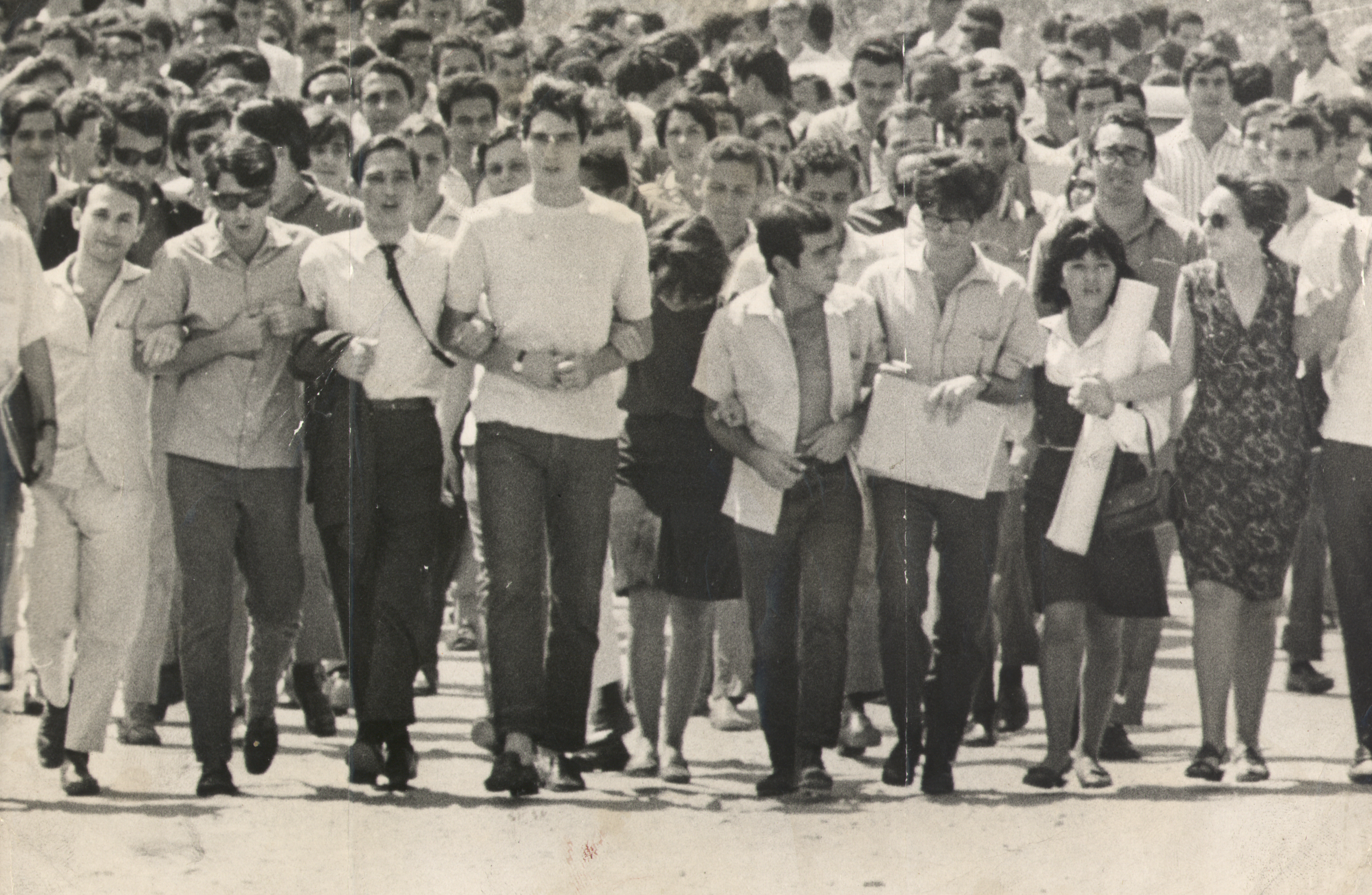
Brazilian students march against the military rule in Brazil, 1966

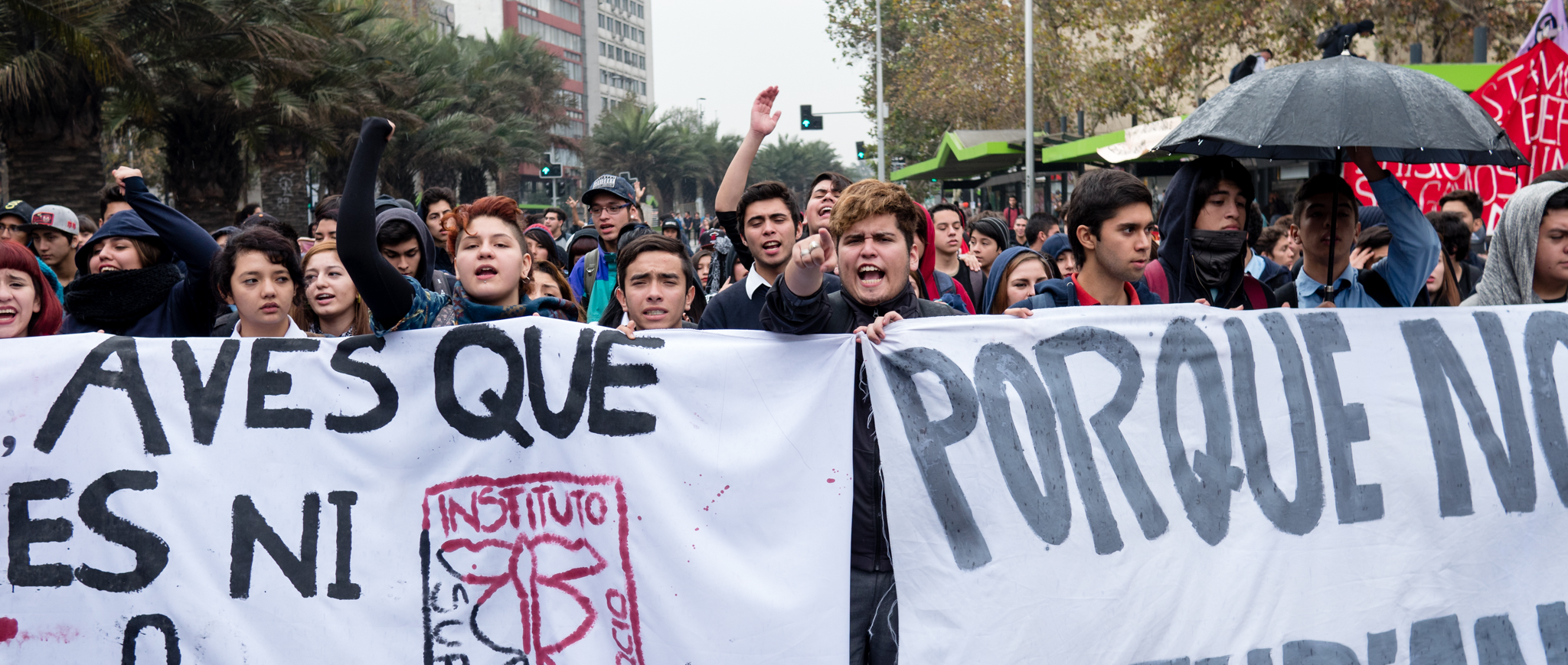
Student syndicalist general strike in Chile

Repertoire of contention in campus protests can take various forms, from peaceful sit-ins, marches, teach-ins, to more active forms that can spread off-campus and include violent clashes with the authorities. Recent research from a quantitative cross-national analysis conducted in 2020 on why student activism most likely takes the form of peaceful protest within the scope of institutional political processes offers an explanation - the emphasis in higher education curriculum to support values, deliberation, and new ideas. Campus protests can also involve faculty members participating in them in addition to students, through protests led by or organized by faculty, rather than students, are a minority. Just like students can worry about being expelled for participation in the protests, some faculty members are concerned about their job security if they were to become involved in such incidents.

A common tactic of student protest is to go on strike (sometimes called a boycott of classes), which occurs when students enrolled at a teaching institution such as a school, college or university refuse to go to class. It is meant to resemble strike action by organized labour. Whereas a normal strike is intended to inflict economic damage to an employer, a student strike is more of a logistical threat: the concerned institution or government cannot afford to have a large number of students simultaneously fail to graduate. The term "student strike" has been criticized as inaccurate by some unions and commentators in the news media. These groups have indicated that they believe the term boycott is more accurate.

Student protests can often spread off-campus and grow in scale, mobilizing off campus activists and organizations, for example the 2014 Hong Kong class boycott campaign led to the city-wide 2014 Hong Kong protests.

One form that student-led activism can take is through the deliberate utilization of posters and slogans. There is research to support the method of analyzing rhetoric and visual demonstrations used in student protests to better understand the motivations and goals of a social movement. Cécile Van De Velde, a sociology professor at the University of Montreal, offers a relevant perspective on protest writings within social movement research. She posits that such rhetoric used on student posters possess an "expressive richness," allowing researchers to better understand the concerns, shared identities, and emotional expressions of those involved in the movement. To help highlight the importance of slogans, Van De Velde discusses the 1960s feminist movement slogan ‘The personal is the political’ which was decisive in the development of the movement itself from the 1960s onward.

== Response and aftermath ==
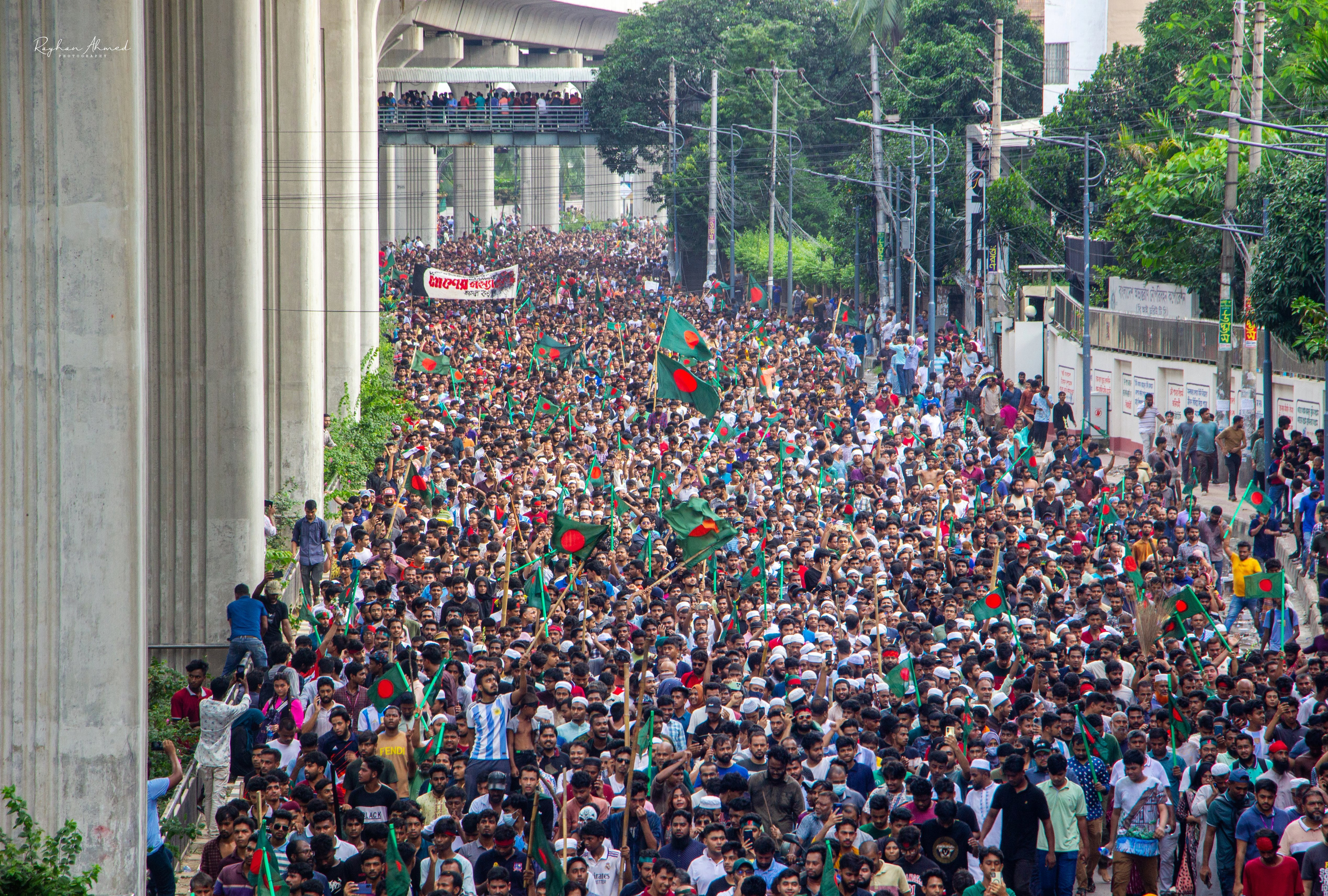
Victory march by Bangladeshi students after the resignation of Sheikh Hasina in 2024

Over time, university tolerance of campus protests have grown; while protests occurred before the 20th century they were more likely to be "crushed... with an iron fist... by university leaders" than by mid-20th century, when they have become much more common and tolerated. By the early 21st century, the university response to campus protest in the United States is much more likely to be negotiations, and willingness to yield at least to some of the student demands. There was a resurgence of student activism in the United States in 2015. In Germany, tuition in public universities were abolished in response to student protests between 2006 and 2016.

University response to student activism and campus protests can still be much harsher in less liberal countries like China or Taiwan. In 1980 student protests in South Korea were violently suppressed by the military (the Gwangju uprising). As recently as in 1989 a large scale student demonstration in China that moved off-campus, the 1989 Tiananmen Square protests and massacre, was met with deadly force.

== Examples ==
- 2025 Indonesian protests
- 2024 Serbian anti-corruption protests
- 2024 Anti-quota protest: Youths of Bangladesh toppled a dictator
- 2024 pro-Palestinian protests on university campuses
  - 2024 Columbia University pro-Palestinian campus occupation
- 2024 Boston University strikes
- 2023 University of Brighton protests
- 2023 University of Manchester protests
- 2022 Universidad Autónoma de Querétaro (Querétaro, México) strike and occupation
- 2022 Huntington High School walkout
- 2021 Newport High School Student Demonstration
- 2021 Boğaziçi University protests
- 2021 Columbia University strike
- 2020 Thai protests
- 2019–2020 Iraq student protests^{Ref.?}
- 2019 JNU Protests in New Delhi – India^{Ref.?}
- 2018–2020 "Fridays for Future" School strike for climate – global
- 2018 Bangladesh road safety protests
- 2018 "March for Our Lives" student protest – United States
- 2017–18 Mahatma Gandhi Central University protests – India
- 2017–18 Iranian protests
- 2017 Jallikattu protests – India
- 2016 SATs Strike protest against tests for 6 and 7-year olds – UK
- 2016 Boston Public School students walkout in protest of budget cuts – United States^{Ref.?}
- 2016 Joint Student protests in Central Universities India^{Ref.?}
- 2016 JNU Student Protests in New Delhi – India^{Ref.?}
- 2015 "Fees Must Fall" – South Africa
- 2015 University of Missouri protests – United States
- Million Student March – United States
- 2015 Bangladesh student protests
- 2015 University of Amsterdam Bungehuis and Maagdenhuis Occupations – Netherlands
- 2014 Jadavpur University protests – India
- 2014 Hong Kong student protest for democracy
- 2014 Sunflower Student Movement – Taiwan
- 2014 Iguala mass kidnapping – Mexico
- 2012 Quebec student protests – Canada
- 2012 Valencia student protests
- 2011 student protests in Chile
- 2010 University of Puerto Rico Strike
- 2010 UK student protests
- 2008 Greek riots
- 2007 Dutch pupil strike
- 2006 student protests in Chile
- 2006 student uprising in Iran
- 2005 Quebec student protests – Canada
- July 1999 Iran student protests
- 1996–1997 protests in Serbia
- 1996 Quebec student protests – Canada
- 1989 Tiananmen Square protests and massacre – China
- 1989 Anti-SAP riots – Nigeria
- 1988 Deaf President Now protest – United States
- 1980 student protests in Kabul – Afghanistan
- 1978 "Ali Must Go" protests – Nigeria
- 1976–77 Soweto uprising – South Africa
- November 1973 Athens Polytechnic uprising – Greece
- 25 June 1973 Cowper Street School strike - Leeds, UK
- 1971 Diliman Commune – Philippines
- 1970–1972 Huelga schools, Houston – United States
- 1970 Student Strike – United States
- Protests of 1968
  - 1968–69 Japanese university protests
  - Third World Liberation Front strikes of 1968–1969 – United States
  - 1968 student demonstrations in Yugoslavia
  - May 1968 uprisings – France
  - 1968 protests in Poland
  - 1968 East L.A. walkouts – United States
- 1966 Chinese Cultural Revolution
- 1965 Anti-Hindi agitations of Tamil Nadu – India
- 1964–65 U.C. Berkeley Free Speech Movement – United States
- 1960 Anpo protests – Japan
- 1956 Bucharest student movement – Romania
- 1954 National Service riots – Singapore
- 1924-1925 Fisk University protest
- 1911 School strikes in the United Kingdom
- 1901–1904 Września children strike – Poland
- 1766 Butter rebellion at Harvard University – United States
- 1229 University of Paris strike – France

== See also ==
- Academic Crisis
- Civil disobedience
- Campus police
- Social movement
- Student voice
