= Segun Okeowo =

Nigerian educationist (1948-2014)

- Born: 5 August 1948; Shagamu, Ogun State, Nigeria
- Died: 28 January 2014 (aged 65); Olabisi Onabanjo University Teaching Hospital, Sagamu
- Other name: Mikael Eniolorunda
- Education: University of Ife
- Occupation: Educationist
- Known for: Ali Must Go Protests; National Union of Nigerian Students
- Children: 9

Segun Okeowo was a Nigerian educationist, who is best known for being the president of the National Union of Nigerian Students at the forefront of the Ali Must Go protests.

== Early life and education ==
Segun Mikeal Okeowo was born on 5 August 1948 in Shagamu, Ogun State. He attended St Luke's College, Ibadan between 1961 and 1964 before proceeding to Adeyemi College of Education, Ondo in 1971. He attended University of Lagos between 1975 and 1978 but was rusticated from the university following his role as the president of the now banned National Union of Nigerian Students in the 1978 Ali Must Go protests. He however graduated from the University of Ife in 1980 with a first degree in education.

== Ali Must Go ==
Okeowo began his journey in activism as a student of Adeyemi College of Education in Ondo State, where he was the president of the students’ union before joining University of Lagos where he also rose to become the leader of University of Lagos Students’ Union (ULSU). He then became the President of the National Union of Nigerian Students (NUNS).

Okeowo led students across Nigeria in protest against a hike in students’ meal ticket by the Olusegun Obasanjo led military administration. Following meetings and consultations with the Federal Military Council as represented then by the Federal Commissioner for Education, Col. Ahmadu Ali. Without achieving a reversal, NUNS called out all students to embark on a national protest which was to be tagged ‘Ali Must Go’ after the then Commissioner for Education.

He was promptly rusticated from the University of Lagos in the wake of the historic protests. NUNS was also proscribed.

== Later life ==
=== Career ===
Despite gaining notoriety for his role in the Ali must go protests, after his graduation, he lived a quiet life as an educationist. He served as a principal in Makun High School, Ogijo High School, Christ Apostolic Grammar School and Iperu Remo all in Ogun State. He was appointed as the Chairman of Ogun State Teaching Service Commission where he retired in 2011.

Okeowo was a prominent figure in the Nigerian Union of Teachers (NUT) and was appointed as a commissioner in the Ogun State Electoral Commission in 1983.

In 1986, Okeowo was appointed as one of the panelists that examined the Ahmadu Bello University Students’ Crisis.

=== Personal life ===
He married 3 wives Alice Abayomi, Florence oluyemisi and Mojibade .

He was honored with some traditional titles which include Akogun of Makun, Olootu Omoba of Simawa, Bobajiro of Idena and Obamuwagun of Iperu-Remo.

=== Death ===
Okeowo died on January 28, 2014, in Olabisi Onabanjo University Teaching Hospital, Sagamu. He was buried in Simawa, Ogun State.
