= Dutch pupil strike =

Student protests in the Netherlands

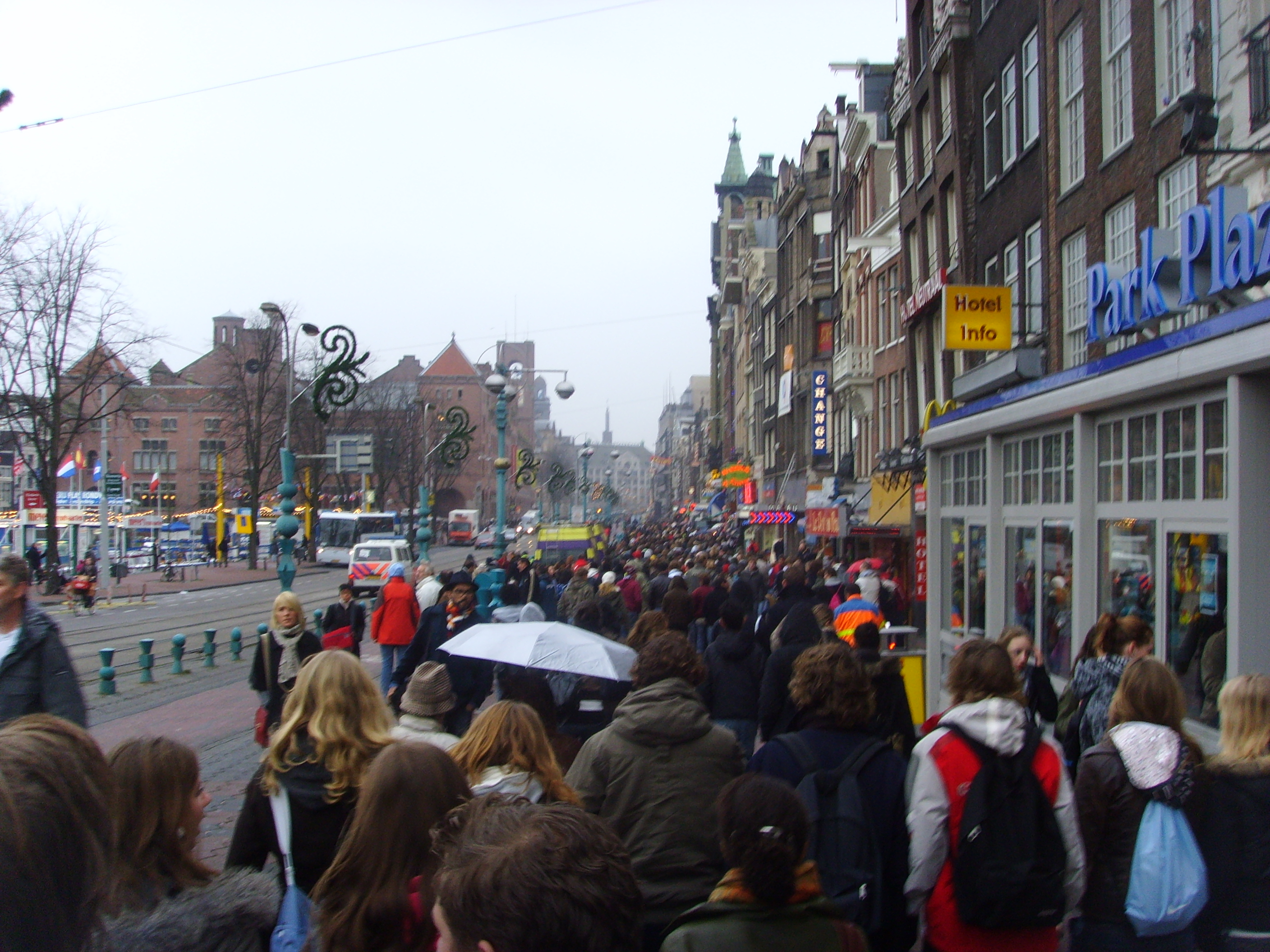
A group of protesting students on their way to a demonstration on the Damrak, Amsterdam

The Dutch pupil strike in 2007 was a series of student strikes in which students from the Netherlands, upset by demands from the government on its schools, ignored lessons and often went with masses to city halls in their municipalities.

== Motivation ==
The pupil strike was motivated by the demands of the state on schools to fill up the demanded 1040 clock hours they have to legally teach each year. The state wanted schools to fill these up with extra hours in which pupils were to be in the class with a teacher without getting actual lessons. Pupils state this does not increase the quality of education.

== First strike ==
As an effect of these policies organizations like DWARS and LAKS called for a strike on Friday 23 November. This call was done via instant messaging. Pupils throughout the nation joined in the strike and started ignoring lessons that day starting from 11:00 AM. A second strike was called for on Monday 26 November and yet again many pupils participated.

The strike on Friday was generally calm, several pupils were however arrested on various charges. The strike on Monday was much wilder, with up to 21 pupils being arrested in Amsterdam alone.

== Effect ==
Secretary of State Van Bijsterveldt made some concessions, easing the demands on the 1040 hour demand by cutting 40 hours of. Also a debate had been called and on Wednesday 28 November, but the decision around the 1040-hour demand remained.

== Size of the strike ==
The pupil strike was a sizeable strike with thousands of pupils skipping their classes, the size of the strike could be attributed to the use of instant messaging software like MSN.

== Second strike ==
Disgruntled with the lack of action by the Dutch state another strike was called for, this time to be held in Amsterdam. This turned out to be less of a success as LAKS had hoped for, with only 15'000 of the expected twenty- to fifty-thousands strikers turning up.

== December 2011 strike ==
LAKS asked all students to strike on 21 December 2011 because the government wanted to shorten the summer holidays and increase the demanded clock hours to 1040 hours, as had happened four years prior. LAKS and school pupils are against these plans because the government is going for quantity instead of quality.
