= Ahmadu Ali =

Nigerian military officer, a physician and politician

Colonel Ahmadu Ali

Chairman of the PDP National Working Committee
- In office 2005–2007
- Preceded by: Audu Ogbeh
- Succeeded by: Vincent Ogbulafor

Minister of Education
- In office 1975–1978

Personal details
- Born: 1 March 1936 (age 90) Idah, Kabba Province, Northern Region, Colonial Nigeria (now in Kogi State)
- Awards: Commander of the Order of the Niger

Military service
- Allegiance: Nigeria
- Branch/service: Nigerian Army
- Years of service: 1963–1979
- Rank: Colonel
- Battles/wars: Nigerian Civil War

Ahmadu Adah Ali // (born 1 March 1936) is a retired Nigerian military officer, a physician and a politician. He was born in Idah, Igala Kingdom. Ali served as the Deputy Director of Army Medical Services and Chief Consulting Physician of the Military Hospital, Kaduna. In 1973, he became the first Director-General of the National Youth Service Corps, a position he held until 1975 when he was appointed Minister of Education. He served also as Chairman of the PDP National Working Committee from 2005 to 2007.

== Early life and education ==
Ali was born to Mallam Ukuteno Ali Anaja, a member of the ruling house of Attah of Igala and Hajiya Aideko Maimuna. He attended Dekina primary school and then Okene middle school. Following the death of his father, Ali was sponsored through school by the Attah of Igala. He had his basic education in Idah and went on to secondary school in Zaria (now Barewa College) in 1949. He graduated from Barewa College in 1954 with the best O'Level results of that year. He proceeded to the Nigerian College of Arts, Science and Technology Zaria for his GCE A Levels. He was an active student unionist and became the general secretary of National Union of Nigerian Students (NUNS).

He gained admission into University College Ibadan to study Medicine. His unionism influenced national politics; As the NUNS secretary of University College Ibadan, he formed a club which invited Sir Ahmadu Bello, the Sardauna of Sokoto, and Premier of the Northern Region, to give a public lecture at the Trenchard Hall of the University of Ibadan. This lecture stirred Southern support for Ahmadu Bello. Speaking on his experience at Ibadan, Ali said “Ibadan has meant everything to me. It has helped to shape my life in a very long way. That Ibadan provided me with meal ticket is not as important as what it stands for in my life. I not only passed through the portals of the University, the University also passed through me! Ibadan defined who I am and what I would become.”

== Career ==
Prior to graduation from medical school, on 14 March 1963, Ali was commissioned as a Second Lieutenant of the Nigerian Army Medical Corps. He was then posted to the First Battalion in Ibadan where he was in charge of the medical reception station whilst running the clinic and receiving military training. Subsequently, he was sent to Glasgow, Scotland for his postgraduate studies.

He was the founding director of the NYSC and had to go on lecture tours of the Nigerian universities to quell agitations against the program.

Ali was appointed the Minister of Education by three consecutive Heads of State; Yakubu Gowon, Murtala Mohammed and Olusegun Obasanjo. During his tenure, he established Federal Government Colleges in Ido Ani, Ondo State and Ugwualawo, Benue State. He also established the National Universities Commission and supervised the first National Policy on Education. During the Olusegun Obasanjo-led military government, his tenure was however marred by the "Ali Must Go" student protests despite not being responsible for the hike in students' fees. The protest chant was used by the students to call for his resignation.

On returning from the Army in 1979 he set up Medicare Clinics Limited, Kaduna which he combined with his appointment as a consultant physician at the 44 Armed Forces Reference Hospital, Kaduna.

He was elected to the Nigerian Senate in 1979, 1982 and 1991 and was a proponent of the creation of Kogi State which was eventually created on 27 August 1991 during the regime of General Babangida.

== Personal life ==
Ali has 1 wife, Dr Marian Nneamaka Ali who hails from Asaba, Delta state, with whom he has 6 children. He has 11 children 5 of which are from previous marriages.
