= Butter rebellion =

1766 student protest at Harvard University

The Butter Rebellion, which took place at Harvard University in 1766, was the first recorded Harvard student protest in what is now the United States. In the decade preceding the American Revolution, economic difficulties made the acquisition of fresh food difficult at Harvard.

A satirical account of the Butter Rebellion, written in biblical style, was penned during the American Revolution. According to this account, one meal with particularly rancid butter led Asa Dunbar (the grandfather of Henry David Thoreau) to tell a tutor, "Behold, our butter stinketh!—Give us, therefore, butter that stinketh not." In the account, Dunbar was punished for insubordination, and the next morning his fellow students protested by leaving their hall, cheering in Harvard Yard, and dining in town.

The protests were led by seniors Dunbar, Daniel Johnson and Thomas Hodgson. The Harvard Corporation admitted much of the butter served to students was rancid, but was alarmed by a month of "violent, illegal, and insulting proceedings". Eventually the Corporation enlisted the help of Massachusetts governor Sir Francis Bernard, who addressed students in the chapel, and ended the crisis.

== Sources ==
- Bethell, John T., Richard M. Hunt, & Robert Shenton. Harvard from A to Z. Harvard University Press: Cambridge, Massachusetts. 2004.
- Buettner, Cynthia K. Parties, Police, and Pandemonium: An exploratory study of mixed-issue campus disturbances. Dissertation, Ohio State University, 2004. (Accessed: November 18, 2007)
- "Butter." Time, March 23, 1925. (Accessed: November 18, 2007)
- Lepore, Jill. Lecture at Harvard University for her course: "Liberty and Slavery, the History of an American Paradox." October 18, 2005.
- Poitier, Beth. "The alpha and omega of Harvard lore" in The Harvard Gazette, June, 2004. (Accessed: November 18, 2007)
- Wood, Sandy & Kara Kovalchik. "College protests in America began in the 1960s, right? Not quite. Back up a couple hundred years," in Mental Floss, April 6, 2003. (Accessed: November 18, 2007)
