= 2023 University of Brighton protests =

Student protests at the University of Brighton

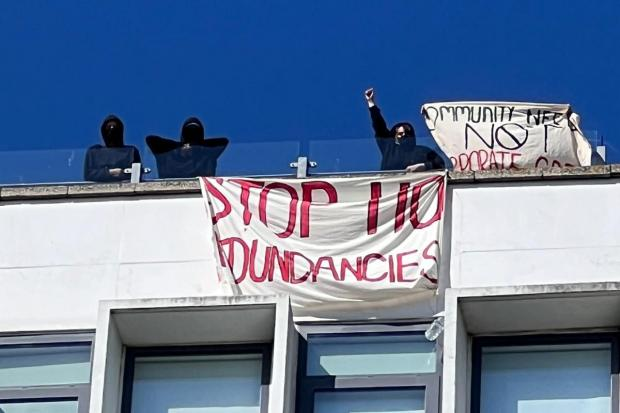
- Hanging protest banner at the University of Brighton
- Date: 15 May 2023 – 9 November 2023
- Location: University of Brighton, Brighton, England
- Goals: Prevent staff redundancies
- Methods: Strikes; Demonstrations; Occupation; Online activism
- Status: Ended - failed to prevent redundancies.

Parties
University of Brighton Solidarity Group (students); Brighton UCU	University of Brighton

The 2023 University of Brighton protests was a series of staff and student protests at the University of Brighton in England. The protests began on 15 May 2023 and concluded on 9 November 2023 after they failed to prevent 104 redundancies.

== Background ==
The protests were in reaction to the University announcing up to 400 staff were put on notice for 110 planned job cuts due to rising costs. The goals of the protesters was to prevent the redundancies. The university said that these redundancies are necessary, blaming inflation and tuition fees being capped at £9,250. The university was aiming to save £17.9 million through redundancies.

Unions, including The University of Brighton UCU and Sussex Students' Union, expressed support and messages of solidarity. The University of Brighton UCU responded to the attacks with a statement, saying they'll fight the redundancies.

The university has been criticised for spending £50 million on construction and for asking staff to take voluntary redundancy. The University and College Union (UCU) has also called for the vice-chancellor and senior management at the university to resign and ran a vote of confidence.

== Student response ==
=== Demonstration ===
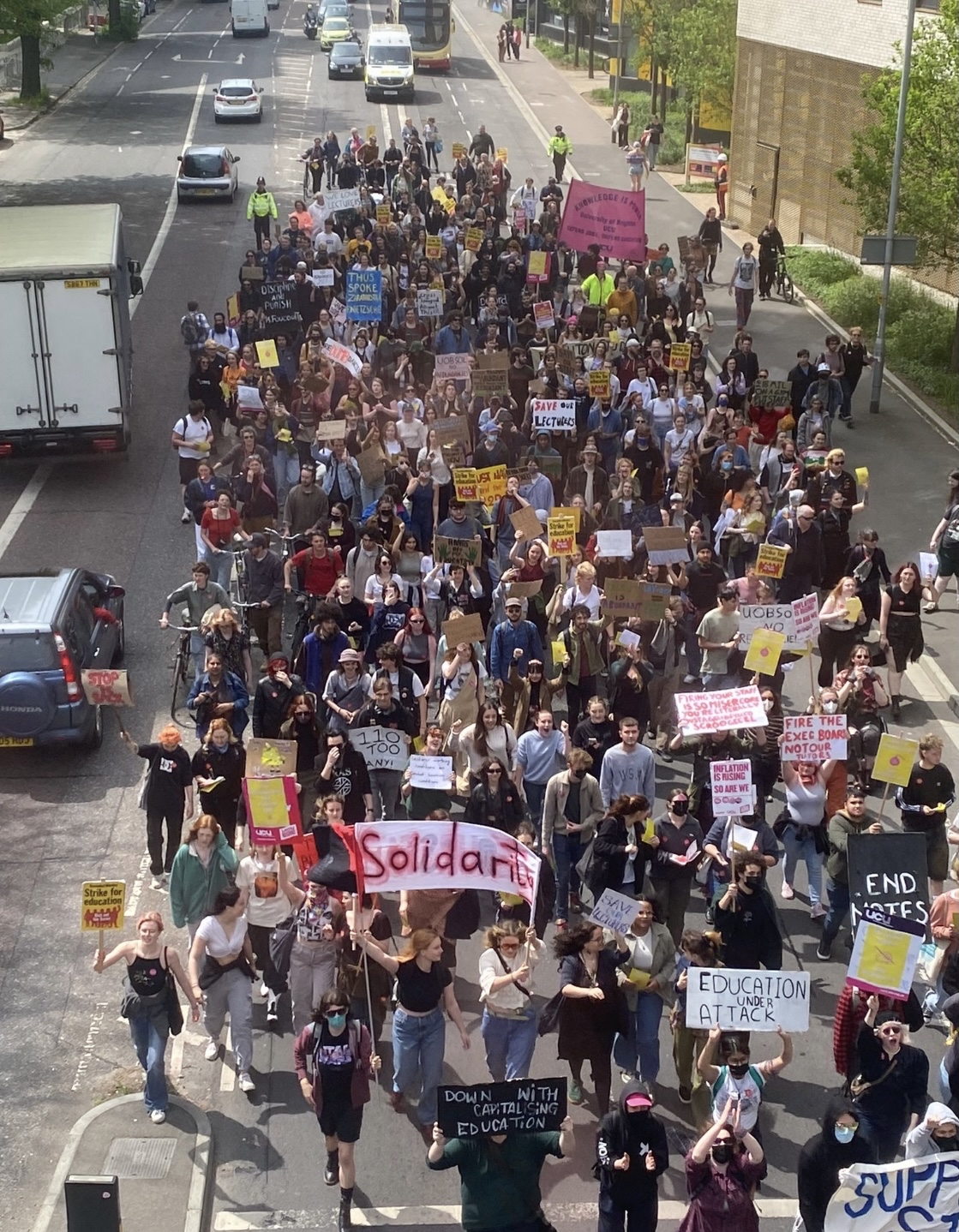
15 May student demonstration against proposed cuts.

On 15 May 2023 students protested outside the university with banners, saying that the job cuts could affect their studies. Staff also said that they are concerned that those who are not affected will have increased workloads. The cuts would also force some course modules and academic research to halt.

Students also attended the UCU protest during an open day at the university on 17 June 2023, marching from The Level to Victoria Gardens.

=== Vice Chancellor’s Office Occupation ===
On 25 May 2023 students occupied the office of the Vice-Chancellor and other rooms on the management floor of the Cockroft building, announcing via Twitter that they would remain there indefinitely until demands were met. The students entered the office in the early hours of the morning according to a university spokesperson.

At approximately 3pm the protest group announced they had also occupied the ground floor entrance to the building, and at approximately 4pm students appeared on the roof and hung banners.

On 26 May students occupying the offices received a letter from solicitors working for the university threatening legal action and filed for a court order to evict them from the building.

On 5 June the occupiers announced the end of their occupation around 4pm as the fire alarm was set off in the building. The group shared an update on social media, calling out the university's security staff for not knowing where fire exits were located, and for not opening the fire exit doors. The university responded saying they treated the occupiers "respectfully" and with "great care".

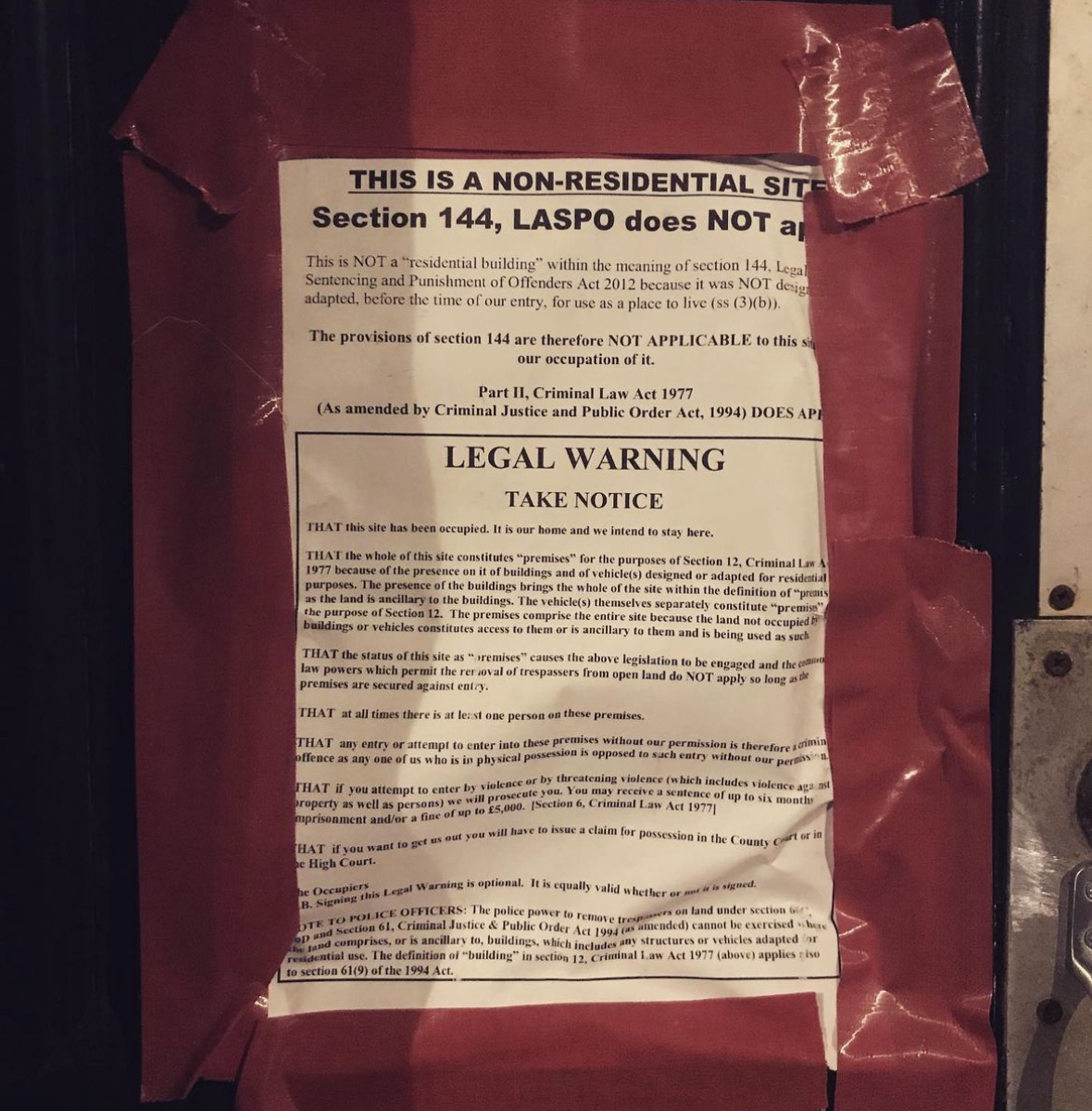
Legal Notice placed by occupiers on the door of Pavilion Parade

=== Pavilion Parade Occupation ===
On 18 September 2023, students occupied the Pavilion Parade university building, aiming to turn it into a community space. The occupation is in response to the university making 103 academic staff redundant in July and the university attempting to sell the building. The group placed a legal warning on the door and security staff from the university are stationed outside the building.

The students occupying the building invited academic staff, students, and the local community to visit. UCU regional official Michael Moran responded to the occupation by saying "It is incredible to see the overwhelming levels of support"

The students occupying the building have accused security staff of assaulting occupiers, however no police reports have been filed.

In response to the occupation, the university hired security staff and erected fencing around the premises.

The students occupied the premises for over a week.

=== Tuition fee demands ===
Students at the university have demanded tuition fees to be refunded for the academic year following the university's redundancies.

== Staff response ==
=== Strikes ===
In May 2023, Brighton UCU announced that staff members are planning a strike in response to the planned cuts and redundancies. After a vote at the union, they shared that they would strike indefinitely from 3 July until demands are met, threatening to disrupt the start of the 2023/24 academic year.

Another strike occurred during the university's freshers week, with a picket line at the entrance to the university. Strikes ended on 10 November 2023 after 129 days.

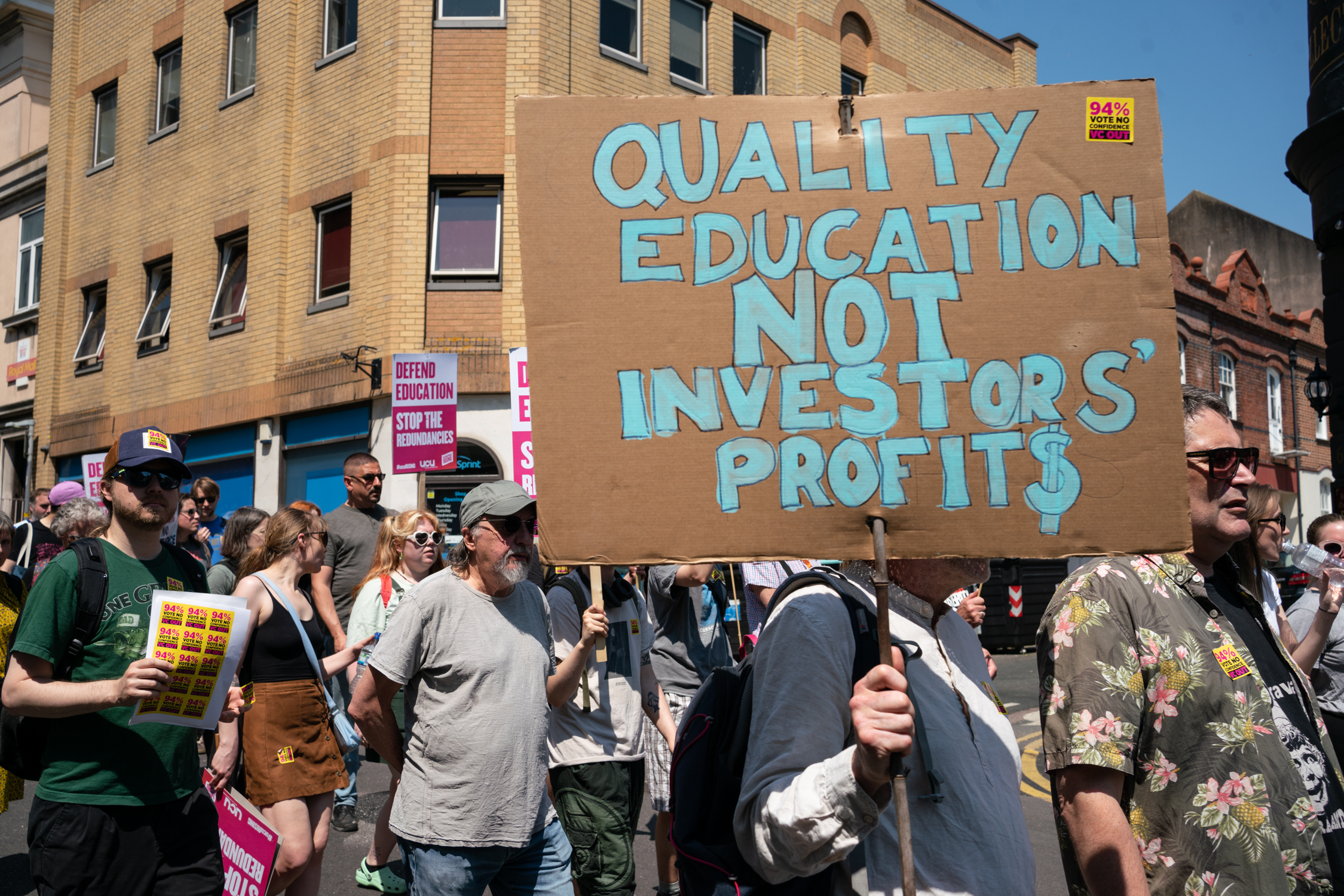
UCU Protest on 17 June 2023 Brighton

=== Demonstrations ===
Students and staff demonstrated on 10 June 2023 to protest the proposed job cuts.

During a second protest organised by the UCU during an open day at the university on 17 June 2023, students gathered at The Level and marched towards Brighton railway station, ending at Victoria Gardens. The UCU estimates that over 500 people attended.

== No Confidence vote ==
1400 staff and students voted in an unofficial no confidence vote, approximately 800 lecturers and 600 students voted. 94% of respondents voted that they had no confidence in the vice chancellor and upper management.

== University and College Union Response ==
=== Boycott ===
The UCU called for a global boycott of the university following the vote to strike. The UCU's higher education committee (HEC) has now voted that the university be "greylisted" which is the union's ultimate sanction, meaning that it's asking its members, other trade unions, and the international community to cease working with the university.

=== Marking and Assessment Boycott ===
Staff at the University of Brighton joined staff at universities around the UK in the UCU's Marking and Assessment Boycott, refusing to mark any assessments at the university. The university criticised the boycott, and told students that most will not be affected.

The boycott meant that students wouldn't get their assessments marked on time for graduation deadlines, which means that many students around the country didn't get degrees on graduation day. It was estimated that it could affect more than half a million graduations around the UK this summer.

== Students' Union Response ==
The University of Brighton Students' Union (BSU) was criticised for their response to the protests and staff redundancies. On 22 June BSU posted a video to their instagram in response to the Marking and Assessment Boycott.

The video contains the union's president saying that academic progression should not be a political football, and that BSU is "distressed" to see students bearing the brunt of the boycotts and strikes between university workers and management.

Student groups criticised the response, saying that the BSU suggested that both the University and College's Union and the university are "both equally making our lives as students difficult", which student groups said is untrue.

== University response ==
The university responded to protests citing rising costs due to inflation and the tuition fee freeze as reasons for the planned redundancies. Vice-chancellor Debra Humphris wrote in an email to staff members "We have already done everything we can to protect jobs wherever possible".

On 24 July 2023, the University made 103 academic staff redundant.

=== Legal action against occupiers ===
On 26 May the university sought an injunction against the students occupying the offices. The students received a letter from solicitors working for the university on the same day threatening legal action saying that the group's actions are a health and safety risk, and unlawful. The university also reported the group to the police. The students rejected the letter, and in response said that their actions were peaceful protest.

On 30 May the university withdrew their application for a court injunction.

=== Treatment of occupiers ===
In a statement released by the University of Brighton Solidarity group on 30 May, the students said they have received homophobic language and other verbal abuse from employees of the university, been flooded with sewage, and had a twelve hour delay in receiving cleaning supplies.

Students occupying the Pavilion Parade building on 18 September posted on Instagram a video of security staff reportedly assaulting students, however no police reports have been filed.

=== Heightened security ===
Security at the university began checking student and staff ID cards at the entrance to buildings, and questioning students what they are doing in the building. Students have reported security staff following them to elevators and knocking on toilet doors to question students in the building.

=== Withholding pay ===
The University began withholding pay during the Marking and Assessment Boycott. University staff and students have criticised the university for this course of action, with some staff claiming they can't afford food due to not being paid. Staff claim the full pay cut is a "scandal" as marking takes up less than 20% off their workload, and they are continuing all other work.

== Outcome ==
On 27 October 2023, the university completed their planned redundancies and strikes ended on 10 November 2023 after 129 days after ultimately failing to reach the goal to prevent redundancies, 104 lecturers were made redundant through 82 voluntary redundancies and 22 compulsory redundancies.

== See also ==
- Brighton UCU response: https://blogs.brighton.ac.uk/ucu/2023/05/04/mass-redundancy-announcement-the-fightback-starts-here/
