= Fisk University protest =

1924–1925 student protest in Tennessee, United States

The Fisk University protest was a student protest from 1924–1925.

The president of Fisk University, located in Nashville, Tennessee, was Fayette McKenzie. McKenzie was accused of exercising a dictatorial rule on campus. He had discontinued the schools magazine and newspaper, canceled the baseball team and cut the football team's budget, and outlawed most extracurricular activities. All such activities were required to have a teacher chaperon. Women had a very strict dress code that they had to follow. Still, most black newspapers supported him because he spent several years raising a million dollar endowment fund for the university. He solicited funds from northern foundations, like the Rosenwald Fund and Rockefeller Foundation. These foundations wanted many African-American schools to abide by and teach the Jim Crow Laws and not try to challenge or reject them.

In May 1924, a very angry W.E.B. Du Bois got on a train to go to his alma mater, Fisk University. His daughter was graduating that year. Hearing that he would be on campus, he was invited to give a speech to the graduating seniors. On June 2, 1924, in the university's chapel there was the president of the university, students, alumni and others in attendance. W. E. B. Du Bois attacked McKenzie with a speech, criticizing all the restrictions placed upon students. In particular, he decried McKenzie's practice of taking black female students down back alleys to sing in white men's clubs to raise money for the university.

Men and women of Black America: Let no decent Negro send his child to Fisk until Fayette McKenzie goes.

— W.E.B. Du Bois

Throughout that summer and early fall, black newspapers debated what to do, with many continuing to support McKenzie and arguing that students needed discipline. In the fall, Du Bois ran several articles in The Crisis, the NAACP magazine that he edited, with direct information from conditions on campus from a student named George Streator. In November, the board of trustees arrived at campus for a visit. Streator organized a peaceful protest to demand that students and alumni be given a say in their college's governance. Due to the protest the board of trustees suggested that McKenzie make some compromises. McKenzie agreed initially to the recommended suggestions of the board of trustees, but eventually refused to cooperate with the student leaders.

In December and January, McKenzie and Du Bois traveled around the country trying to bring support to their side of the debate. In many black and white communities opinions on the issue ran along racial lines

In March, 1925, some of the male students again protested. They carried placards around the campus demanding change, but were in their dorm by eleven o'clock. Nevertheless, McKenzie had responded to the day's protests by calling in the all-white Nashville police to restore order. There were about eighty police officers that had riot guns who broke into and searched the men's dormitory. In particular, they were looking for six men on a list that McKenzie provided (those who signed the original protest the previous fall, including Streator). Most of these young men were not on campus, but regardless were named as the instigators in the "riot." Those that were caught were taken to jail, but eventually released. The idea of brutal policemen descending on a peaceful campus was what finally changed public opinion, particularly through black newspaper coverage, in favor of the students. The students and Nashville community then organized a protest along with the community which lasted for 8 weeks, and included a boycott of the school. All the students went home rather than continuing the semester. McKenzie then resigned even though he still had the board of trustees' support. Thomas E. Jones, a white minister from the north, replaced him as president. Jones stayed for several decades before Charles S. Johnson became the first black president of Fisk in 1947.

This confrontation between the students and the administrators was the first of several protests in black colleges over the next few years. Students demanded a greater role in administrative decisions, alumni representation on the board of trustees, and more personal freedom. At Howard University, an African-American president was elected as a result of these protests.
