= Million Student March =

United States student protest movement

Million Student March is a day-of-action student protest movement in the United States of America involving 110 college campuses and high school students, undergraduate students, graduate students, and college campus workers, from campuses across the country marching in protest against high tuition fees and student debt. The movement also demands the minimum wage for college campus workers be $15 an hour. The movement states that the march is in response to a financial crisis in the United States of America caused by the economic decline in 2008. The movement has been endorsed by politicians such as Bernie Sanders.

== Origin ==
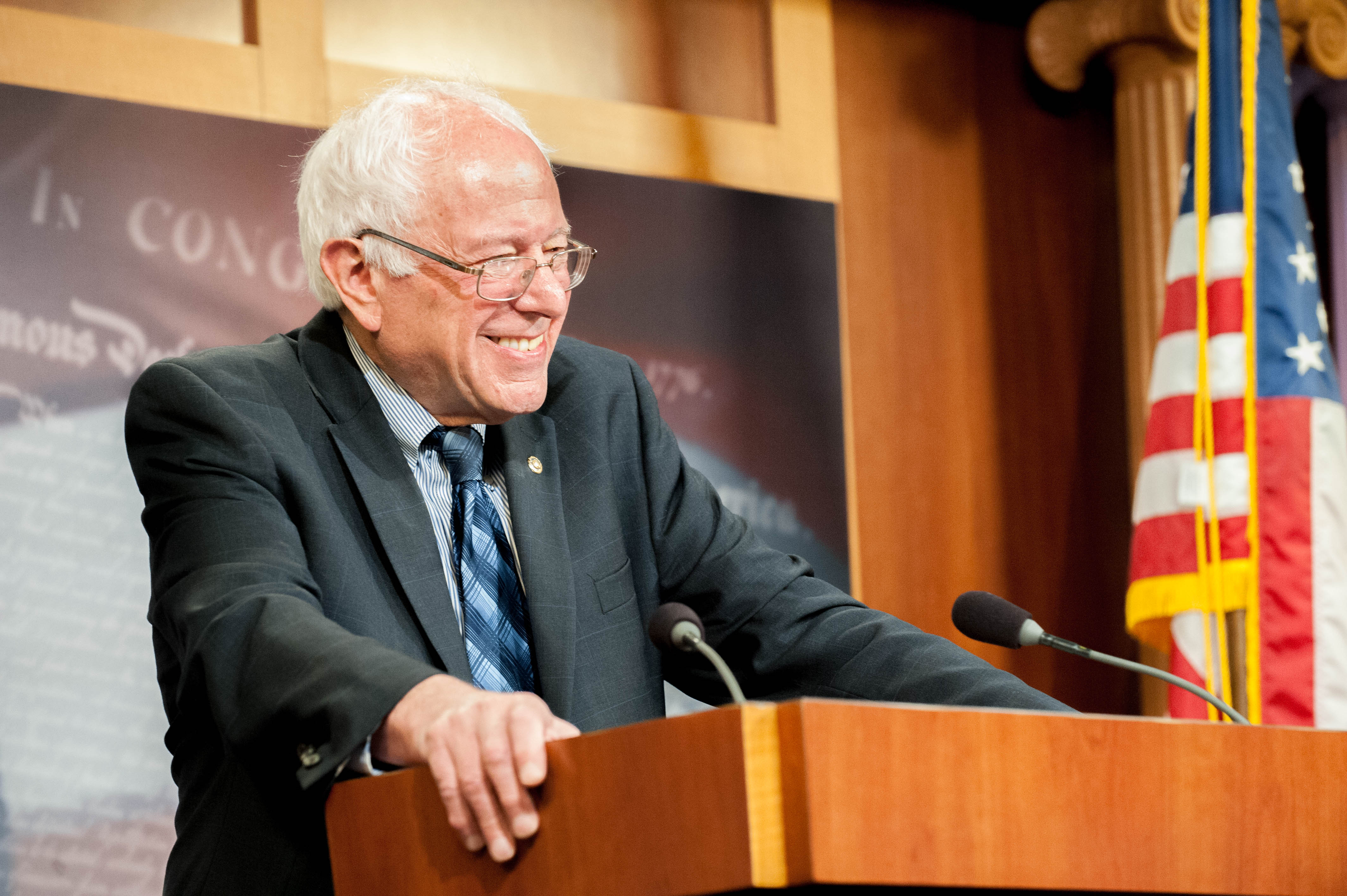
Bernie Sanders in June 2015. His remark in a TV interview with Katie Couric initiated the idea of mass student demonstrations for tuition-free colleges and cancellation of student debt.

The march was originally organized on November 12, 2015. It has resonated with the millennial generation due to them taking on crippling debt for higher education.

- average college debt for a student from the Class of 2015 is $35,000.
- the total amount in student academic debt in the United States is $1.2 trillion which is owed by 40 million Americans.
- 58 percent of the student debt is owed by the most economically challenged quarterly of American students.
- An estimate of over 70% of students who graduate college with an undergraduate degree are in about $29,000 in debt, and are in no great deal of urgency to repay it.

The concept for the Million Student March is attributed to Senator Bernie Sanders who said :

If a million young people march on Washington they to the Republican leadership, we know what's going on, and you better vote to deal with student debt. You better vote to make public universities and colleges tuition free, that's when it will happen.

— Bernie Sanders, during an interview with Katie Couric on 1 June 2015 on Yahoo! News

On Bernie Sander's campaign one of his many messages to the public was the importance of free higher education and education debt relief. How to start eliminating the student debt was the primary force to start the march and its message. Although the Million Student March organizers felt that he opened up a dialogue and pathway for the movement; not in any way where they gonna back him as a candidate.

== Demands and Reasons ==
The Million Student March aims to fight to achieve the following:

- Tuition-free college education: For the reason that access to higher education for minorities is under attack, as stated by the movement's website. The National Center for Education Statistics, said that the prices for undergraduate tuition, room, and board at public colleges and universities rose 40 percent from 2002 to 2012. In contrast to this statistic the recent budget proposed for Pell grants has been lowered by $5 billion every year.
- Cancellation of student debt: According to the movement's website the burden of student debt institutionalizes and promotes racism, with 58% of minorities borrow more than their white peers. Also with congress increasing the interest rate by 13% in 2013; the website states that this keeps the poor in debt.
- A minimum $15 per hour wage for campus workers: The distribution of public university's funds are not adequate enough for individuals who belong and believe in the movement. The top earners at public universities are top administrators take home six and seven figure salaries, then there are adjunct professors who only earn based on the courses they teach, then finally campus workers are paid under poverty line incomes and rely on government and federal programs to compensate for what their wages do not cover. Nation-wide demands for $15/hr minimum wage has become a huge topic across many states and even become a thing in cities and states like Seattle, San Francisco, Arizona, and Washington D.C.
- That all university endowments divest from private prisons: Funding for some college institutions have been also funded by private prisons. These private prisons receive state funding for high rates of incarceration. The movement wishes to separate higher education with the mass incarcerations of minorities and people of color.

== Politics ==
Student debt has become an issue for some young-adult Americans, and with the collective student debt reaching $1.3 trillion. In the 2016 U.S. presidential campaign both parties had agendas about education and the budget that comes along with it. The Democratic Party advocated for debt relief and free public higher education. Even though not a huge part of her campaign, Democratic nominee Hillary Clinton brought up the topic in some of her debates against Republican nominee Donald Trump. The Republican party in regards to their presidential nominee and the winner of the election Donald Trump never really spoke about the topic, but representatives for the party in Florida like Senator Marco Rubio and former Governor of Florida Jeb Bush have expressed the topic as an economic issue that needs to be addressed. The issue of student debt resonates mostly with millennial and was an issue that democrats and liberals thought would be a strong issue to stand on. A well thought out plan was in order to facilitate this debt-relief system, this issue goes along with their agenda on universal healthcare and holds the same amount of weight. In the Republican party the most vocal advocate for student debt relief is Sen. Marco Rubio. He has implemented programs in Florida in order to avoid the taking on of debt by students, such as backed-income sharing and online learning. Although Sen. Rubio has implemented these plans he also has teamed with other senators to create new plans that deduct an automatic percentage out of the individual's earnings instead of the already implemented pay as you earn plan. Some economist believe this plan to be worse in the long run. In all the Republican Party is more inclined to cut budgets and relief for higher education debt, under the belief that it is the individual's responsibility to know what are the risks and benefits of taking on student loans.

== Social Media Impact ==
Social media is something that is so commonly used among generation z and millennials that the fact that social movements occur on social media as a way of gaining traction and how to spread the word about why, how, who, what, and where. The million student march movement has gained follows through posts on social networking sites such as Twitter and Facebook. They share the pictures and the reasons why the march is important to them online. Social media allows the movement to go nationwide and it allows for people who believe in the same things to open up dialogue. Through the use of this medium other sources of media can cover the social movement and document how the marches are conducted. In other movements around the world social media is a platform for racial, political, gender, and generational issues/movements. In Chile their cause for political change can be related to the social protest and there is a direct link with protest and Facebook.

== March of 12 November 2015 ==
The first Million Student March was organised and held on 12 November 2015 at over a hundred campuses in the United States. Hundreds of students gathered in a number of colleges and demonstrated for free tuition, cancellation of student debt and other issues. Campuses where demonstrations took place included University of California, Santa Barbara campus, Temple University in Philadelphia, University of Texas at Austin, University of Massachusetts Amherst, City College of New York in Manhattan and Northeastern University in Boston, besides many others.

== March of 13 April 2016 ==
The second Million Student March was organised and held on 13 April 2016 at a number of campuses in the United States. This march was to draw in attention of politicians and the presidential candidates.

== Supporters ==
The Million Student March has been endorsed by Bernard Sanders, Jill Stein, Thom Hartmann and Noam Chomsky.

According to the Million Student March website the movement has a long list of donors and supporters for the cause

- Noam Chomsky
- Jill Stein
- Thom Hartmann
- U.S. Uncut
- United States Student Association
- Student Labor Action Project
- National Nurses United
- Socialist Alternative
- Movement for Bernie
- Green Party US
- Students for Free Tuition
- Young Greens Rising: Students for Jill Stein
- College Students for Bernie
- Young Democratic Socialists
- Energy Action Coalition
- Graduate Teaching Fellowship
- 15 Now
- Green Party Youth Caucus
- Angry Millennials
- For Student Power
- Gamechanger Labs
- Millennials for Bernie
- Center for Education Policy Advocacy
- New Jersey United Students
- And many local chapters of various student and progressive organizations at colleges and universities all around the country!
