= 1989 Anti-SAP riots =

Nigerian student-led anti-government protests

1989 Anti-SAP Riots
- Date: 24 May 1989 – June 1989
- Location: Nigeria
- Caused by: Effects of the Structural Adjustment Program; Increased petrol prices; Increased food prices
- Goals: Abolition of SAP; Abolition of examination fees; Increased education funding; Removal of security agents patrolling universities; Free healthcare for the elderly, women and all Nigerians up to the age of 18; Reopening of universities; Provision of free education up to the secondary level
- Methods: Rallies; Protests; Lecture boycotts

Parties
National Union of Nigerian Students (NUNS)	Nigerian Government

Casualties
- Deaths: 2 in Benin and dozens in other big cities
- Arrested: Gani Fawehinmi; NUNS president

1989 Anti-SAP riots were a series of violent student-led anti-government protests that occurred throughout Nigeria between May and June 1989. The protesters included students, non students, employed workers, the unemployed, school children and hoodlums. The protests commenced on 24 May 1989.

== Background ==
The International Monetary Fund (IMF) imposed Structural Adjustment Program (SAP) was introduced as a government policy in 1986 in an attempt to stop the effects of falling oil prices and foster development of local industries. It was aimed at devaluing the Naira, reduced welfare spending, mass retrenchments and curbing corruption. These measures were to ensure that Nigeria qualified for IMF-issued loans. It represented a period of austerity measures and as a result, Nigerians had to leave home earlier than usual for their daily commute due to a collapse in the transportation system, were relegated to a single meal per day and student accommodations were overcrowded. On 10 April 1988, the Nigerian National Petroleum Corporation (NNPC) announced an increase in the cost of petroleum products. The increase in the price of petroleum products led to a concomitant increase in food prices and transportation costs. A peaceful protest at the University of Jos was held. The protests eventually snowballed beyond the student community. They resulted in the widespread destruction of state-owned property. Chukwuemeka Odumegwu Ojukwu, former secessionist leader of Biafra was quoted as saying "In the past you needed a pocketful of naira to bring home a basketful of goods. Now you seem to need a basketful of naira to bring back a pocketful of goods." An economist, Professor Sam Aluko also said "There is an alternative even to death, which is living. SAP is the kiss of death." In the wake of the 1988 protests, the military government closed 31 learning institutions, banned the National Association of Nigerian Students and charged it leaders to court. It was alleged that the students were being used as instruments of political saboteurs; a minister of communication was quoted as saying "students cannot go on the rampage just because of a 2.5 kobo increase in fuel prices. How many students own cars?" Prior to the introduction of SAP, the Nigerian constitution of 1979 made it illegal for public office holders to own foreign bank accounts. They were also forbidden from receiving gifts while discharging their duties in public office. An Ebony Magazine article listed the then president, Ibrahim Babangida, as one of the wealthiest men in the world as the third richest leader in Africa and seventh worldwide. It was alleged that Babangida, his wife and chief of staff had overseas accounts. The false rumours were put on handbills and distributed nationwide. This angered the students who were the most vocal group against the SAP measures because they had been subjected to austerity measures meanwhile the president and the people around him were perceived to be living lavish. While there had been concerted efforts to quell trade unions such as the Nigeria Labour Congress and Academic Staff Union of Universities, multiple governments failed at banning the National Association of Nigerian Students (NANS).

In November 1988, the 20th Senate meeting of the NANS highlighted a 10-point demand and issued a six-week ultimatum to the government. Thee demands included the abolition of SAP, abolition of examination fees, increased education funding, remove security agents patrolling universities, free healthcare for the elderly, women and all Nigerians up to the age of 18, reopening of universities and provision of free education up to the secondary level. The duration of the ultimatum elapsed on 6 April 1989 and the 21st Senate of NANS was converged in Ibadan on 5 May 1989. The senate resolves to organise rallies on 16 May to highlight their demands.

== Protests ==
Following the expiration of the NANS ultimatum, the students organised a seminar titled 'Pains of SAP' while the university organised a counter seminar titled 'Gains of SAP'. This did little to convince the students. The protests started with a peaceful demonstration by the students of the University of Benin on 24 May 1989; they processed with a mock coffin and green leaves chanting "SAP must go, we are dying of hunger in the name of SAP", "SAP is a vampire" and "We are fed up with the military and SAP". The peaceful protests soon turned into mob riots involving market women, hoodlums and gangsters. Petrol stations were burned down and about 809 prisoners in Benin were released. Their aim was to destabilise businesses in order to get the government to meet their demands. In the face of the protests, civilians also suffered because armed robbery and thuggery were also ongoing shrouded under the guise of the anti-government protests. NANS issued a 24-hour ultimatum to meet the 10-point demands in order to quell the protests. This was ignored by the government and the protests snowballed to involve institutions of learning nationwide.

== Aftermath ==
The government accused some Nigerians of trying to force transition to democratic rule by inciting the students and engaging criminals to wreak havoc. The government did not renege on the SAP measures in spite of the agitations. Babangida proclaimed that; "There is no viable alternative (to SAP). Government will continue to do all in its power to cushion the pains of SAP without derailing it...We cannot, and we should not, abandon this programme midway because the pains of trying to reintroduce it at a later stage will be worse than the current pains and we may perish in the process."

Gani Fawehinmi, referred to as a "lawyer and social cudgel" and two other unnamed leaders were arrested by Nigerian soldiers during an anti-SAP forum. A high court judge in Lagos adjudged Fawehinmi's arrest to be unlawful and he was awarded ₦10,000 in damages. Two people died in Benin while dozens of people died in big cities like Lagos. The leader of NANS, Lukman Salilu Mohammed, a final year student of Ahmadu Bello University (ABU), Zaria was arrested and detained and 13 universities were closed in the aftermath of the riots. Some institutions were reopened in July 1989 but did not quell the protest as the students in Obafemi Awolowo University boycotted lectures, demanding the reopening of the other universities and demilitarisation of university campuses. Two other universities were reopened on 30 September 1989. The students contested the closure of universities without the university senate approval, The decision to keep six universities closed until 31 March 1990 was then reversed.

The decree 49 of 1989 concerning student union activities was promulgated. The decree made student union activities illegal if they were not done "in the interest of national security, public safety, public morality or public health". There was a resurgence of cultism on university campuses as a result of the proscription of student unions.

=== SAP relief measures ===
A SAP relief package was designed to provide relief to the masses and proved successful in dousing the agitations. The components of the package included creation of 62,000 jobs as unemployed graduates were instructed to report to ministries for prompt employment and funds were made available for the employment of teachers. Feeding programmes for the poor and transport relief packages were also created. Import duties on vehicles and vehicle spare parts were removed in the wake of the riots.

Students were given ₦500 bursaries in order to cope with the effects of SAP. It is estimated that about $1 billion was spent on the SAP relief measures.

Between March and May 1990, there were nationwide protests in response to a proposed $150 million university restructuring loan from the World Bank which mandated the closure of some university departments. This was met with stiff response from the military government.

The antiSAP riots were deemed successful as Babangida called for elections in the wake of the protests.

== See also ==
- Ali Must Go
- End SARS
