= Vincent Eze Ogbulafor =

Nigerian politician (1949–2022)

Vincent Eze Ogbulafor (24 May 1949 – 6 October 2022) was a Nigerian politician.

He was a former chairman of the People's Democratic Party. Prior to this post, he was National Secretary of the same party. He resigned his appointment as the chair after he was charged for an alleged financial recklessness while serving as a minister.

He was a prince of Olokoro, Umuahia South, the local government of Abia State.

Ogbulafor died on 6 October 2022, at the age of 73.
