= Ali Must Go =

Nigerian Students' Protest

Ali Must Go Protests
- Date: 17 April 1978
- Location: Nigeria
- Caused by: Increase in fees
- Goals: Reversal of fee increment Democratization; Genuine independence Enhancement of the quality of life of the masses
- Methods: Lecture boycotts Public demonstration

Lead figures
Federal Military Council; Nigerian University Commission; Nigerian Army	Nigerian Police; Segun Okeowo; Ahmadu Ali

Casualties
- Deaths: Akintunde Ojo; 8 unnamed students in Zaria
- Injuries: >20 students

The 1978 Ali Must Go Protests or the 1978 students' crisis were student protests in Nigeria following an increase in fees. It has been described as one of the most violent student agitations in Nigeria and sparked the greatest political crisis of the 1975–1979 Mohammed/Obasanjo military administration.

== Cause ==
During the Olusegun Obasanjo-led military regime, Dr. Jibril Aminu, the secretary of the Nigerian University Commission, announced that due to the high cost of living in the country, students would begin to pay extra fees. According to the Nigerian University Commission, tuition fee was to remain free for all undergraduates, sub-degree diploma as well as students of teacher education. Hostel accommodation, however, would be increased to ₦90 per student per session of 36 weeks or ₦30 per student in a session of three terms. The increment also meant that the cost of meal tickets rose from ₦1.50 to ₦2.00 i.e. increased by 50 kobo. The president of the National Union of Nigerian Students (NUNS) at the time, Segun Okeowo, who was a student at the University of Lagos, made attempts to rectify the changes as it was unsatisfactory for the students. The students held meetings in Ilorin, Maiduguri, and Calabar before deciding to take the bold step of challenging the military government on the increment.

Apart from the fees, another agitation of the students was that tertiary education was suffering because there were very few federal government-owned universities and no private or state-owned universities. Tertiary education was therefore seen as a privilege and that the federal government could not cope with the number of people seeking admission. This agitation as well as the increase in fees led to the protests. The then minister of education, Ahmadu Ali, was believed to be at the center of the uprising but he tried to shift responsibility to the Supreme Military Council citing that the increment was made by the Supreme Military Council and not the Ministry of Education. The protest chant 'Ali Must Go' was coined as a result.

== Protests ==
To pressure the Federal Military Government into reverting the increase in fees, there was a nationwide boycott of lectures by all students in tertiary institutions whose local unions were affiliated with NUNS starting on 17 April 1978. The lecture boycotts were to be indefinite, but boycotting lectures only worked on the first day. When the students realized that the government was unwilling to revert the increment, they resorted to public demonstrations. Student leaders held a series of meetings in Maiduguri, Ilorin and Calabar. Okeowo was able to mobilize students across the nation as well as bring the attention of the nation to their plight. The medium-term to long-term aims of the protests were what there should be democratization, genuine independence and enhancement of the quality of life of the masses, among other popular democratic demands. The second day of the protests saw a face-off between the students and the Nigerian Police at the University of Lagos. Akintunde Ojo; an architecture student at the University of Lagos was shot in the leg and he bled to death because he was denied care at LUTH and Orthopedic Hospital, Igbobi. Based on the turn of events, Okeowo sent word to his colleagues at the University of Ibadan, Ahmadu Bello University, Zaria and other federal universities. The protests escalated and the students were in open confrontation with both the Nigerian Army and Police. About 8 students were killed in Zaria by soldiers. The students refused to cower despite the deployment of soldiers. The protests spiraled beyond university campuses leading to fear and apprehension among the populace.

== Aftermath ==
After a week of nationwide protests, the Federal Military Government shut down all universities and advised the students to go home. Three universities were shut indefinitely, and NUNS was banned. There was widespread looting and spontaneous violence.

Though the increment was not reversed, the ‘Ali Must Go’ protest legitimised the power of Nigerian students as it conveyed to the military government, the ability of students to mobilize across the country and carry out effective agitation and force change. The protest also helped to further mainstream student unionism as a national discussion.

The Mohammed Commission of Inquiry was established to investigate the underlying issues that led to the protests, the persons involved and to make necessary recommendations. The report was submitted to the government, following which some staff of the university and students were dismissed.

Okeowo was expelled from the University of Lagos for the role he played in the protests. He however graduated from the University of Ife (now Obafemi Awolowo University) two years later with a bachelor's degree in education. He died on January 28, 2014, aged 73.

A library in the University of Lagos was named in memory of Akintunde Ojo.

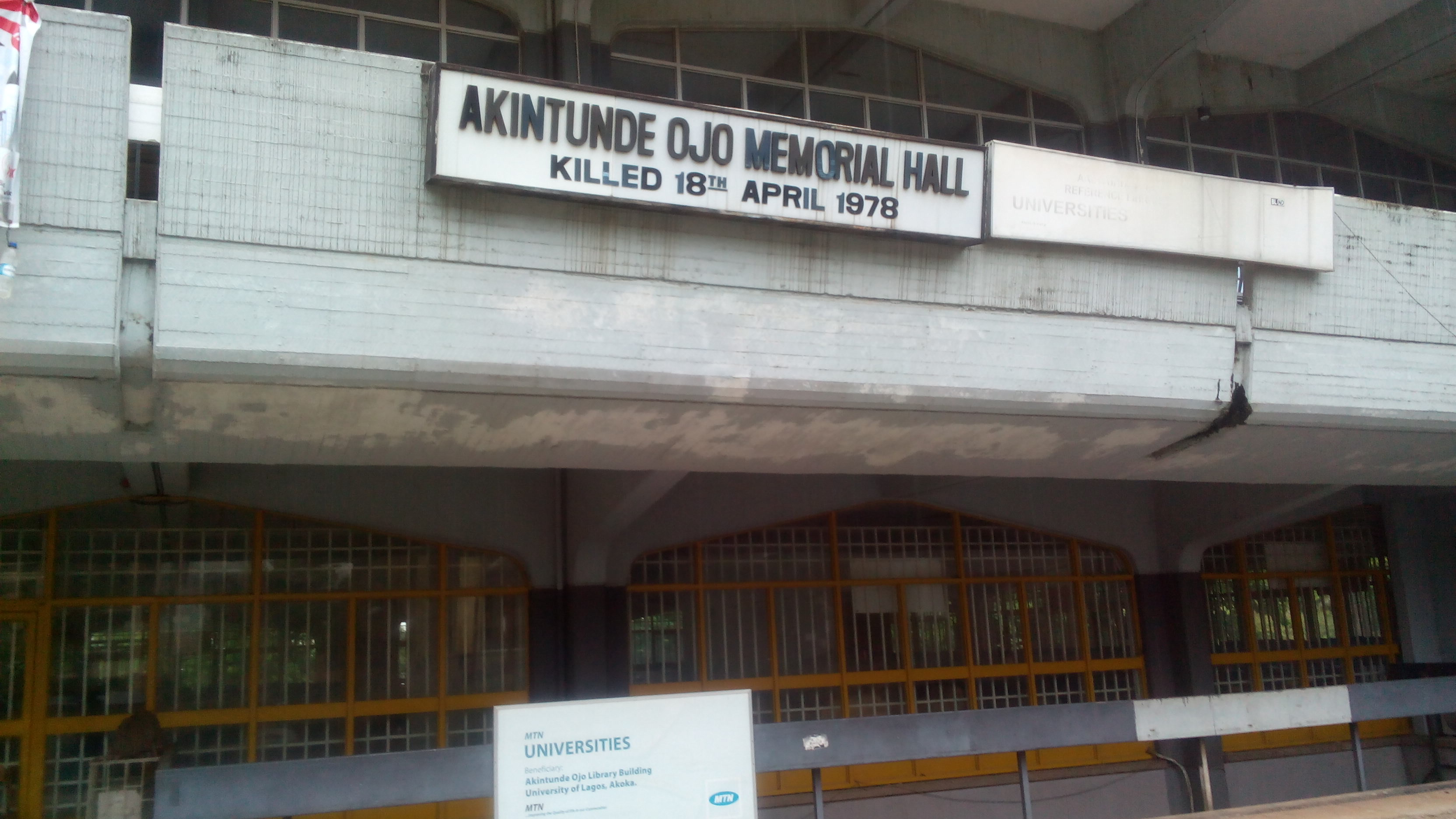
Akintunde Ojo Memorial Library

Comparisons have been drawn between the 2020 End SARS protests and the ‘Ali Must Go’ protests.

== See also ==
- End SARS
- National Union of Nigerian Students
