= National Association of Nigerian Students =

Proscribed Nigerian Student Union

National Association of Nigerian Students (NANS) formerly called National Union of Nigerian Students (NUNS) is a students' union bringing together Nigerian students both within Nigeria and across the diaspora.

NUNS was founded in 1956, following structural changes in the West African Students' Union. It brought together student councils in Ife, Zaria, and Nsukka.

In April 1978, Nigerian students were faced with the imposition of increased fees, and NUNS participated in a series of Campus protests across the whole of Nigeria known as the Ali Must Go protests. The government responded by sending in the army and police, leading to the death or serious wounding of over twenty students. Three universities were closed and NUNS was banned. Several university staff and students were dismissed.

Each president of the association has a tenure of 1 year and the current president elected is Comrade Akinteye Babatunde Afeez.

NANS is a member of the All-Africa Students Union.
